= MS Communications =

American LPTV licensee in the 2000s

MS Communications, LLC held low-power television licenses and construction permits in several U.S. states during the 2000s. At one point MS Communications held the second-highest number of LPTV allocations in the United States, but nearly all of the stations remained unbuilt or dark.

Company president Mark Silberman said that he has intended to start a wireless cable service over LPTV, and had begun acquiring stations as early as 1992. Most of the licenses were acquired in 2000, though direct-broadcast satellite television made the company's original plans obsolete. By 2005, over 200 LPTV station licenses or construction permits were transferred to MS Communications, and MS Communications had the second-highest number of LPTV licenses in the United States, but no stations had operated with more than a test pattern.

After receiving information that stations were not operating and may not have even been constructed, the Federal Communications Commission demanded information on the status of MS Communications stations. When no information was received, the FCC cancelled the licenses of 178 of the stations on October 28, 2010. There were also 60 station licenses or construction permits that were transferred to Silberman but expired by 2018, and many of the MS Communications construction permits and licenses were set to expire in 2018.

== Stations ==
=== Transferred ===
MS Communications transferred the following licenses and construction permits to others:

Call	Ch.	State	City	ID	Buyer	Date	Notes
K69IE	69	California	Eureka	39516	P. Mbaba	January 6, 2005	from M.H. Feldman in 2000; sold per File No. BALTTL-20041117ADU; deleted 2012
W53CC	53	Wisconsin	Milwaukee	56213			was W55CG at Ludington, Michigan; moved to W53CC at Milwaukee; sold per File No. BAPLTTL-20060320AFE (see also line for W38DT, possibly same station)

==== Went on the air ====
The following stations were sold and later went on the air under other owners:

Call	Ch.	State	City	ID	Buyer	Date	Notes
W22BU	22	Maine	Bangor	15287	Rockfleet	2003	bought by MS in 2001
W38DT	38	Wisconsin	Milwaukee	56213	Bustos	June 9, 2006	bought by MS in 2000 as W55MS at Ludington, Michigan; changed to W53CC at Milwaukee, then W38DT. License still on air and active as WTSJ-LD and owned by INNOVATE Corp.
K64EJ	64	Idaho	Boise	31388	Cocola	September 24, 2004	from Joe Maples 2000; sold per File No. BALTTL-20020805ABJ
K56FQ	56	Idaho	Boise	6754	P. Lozano	September 4, 2004	sold per File No. BALTTL-20030707ADU to Lozano; from Lozano to Cocola
K17EH	17	California	Eureka	56149	Sainte	March 9, 2004	File No. BALTTL-20040109ADW; later KEMY-LP then KUVU-LP
K60FH	60	Idaho	Boise	56814	Cocola	June 21, 2004	from R. & R. Detelle in 2000; sold per File No. BALTTL-20040401APR
K30GS	30	Idaho	Boise	74409	Cocola	April 21, 2005	was K68EJ; File No. BALTTL-20050309ABT

=== October 2010 deletion letter ===
These 178 stations had their licenses or permits cancelled, and MS Communications was notified that they were deleted by the FCC on October 28, 2010, among other times, after MS Communications did not respond to FCC requests about the stations' operations:

Call	Ch.	State	City of license	ID
K20EX	20	Arkansas	Batesville	56993
K22ES	22	Arkansas	Batesville	6718
K30EC	30	Arkansas	Batesville	3999
K35EA	35	Arkansas	Batesville	16003
K40DS	40	Arkansas	Batesville	24652
K46EM	46	Arkansas	Batesville	6758
K53FM	53	Arkansas	Batesville	10962
K57FV	57	Arkansas	Batesville	17205
K59FB	59	Arkansas	Batesville	33997
K61FP	61	Arkansas	Batesville	10523
K65FN	65	Arkansas	Batesville	31018
K67GR	67	Arkansas	Batesville	26261
K69GT	69	Arkansas	Batesville	31490
K27FF	27	Arkansas	Eldorado	66233
K29DC	29	Arkansas	Eldorado	17457
K36DR	36	Arkansas	Eldorado	56177
K40EF	40	Arkansas	Eldorado	15293
K46DT	46	Arkansas	Eldorado	49045
K48EP	48	Arkansas	Eldorado	39705
K50EK	50	Arkansas	Eldorado	60445
K53FB	53	Arkansas	Eldorado	39704
K57GF	57	Arkansas	Eldorado	15351
K59FJ	59	Arkansas	Eldorado	15352
K63FX	63	Arkansas	Eldorado	40273
K66EX	66	Arkansas	Eldorado	15334
K69HO	69	Arkansas	Eldorado	32239
K27FX	27	California	Eureka	3937
K41FD	41	California	Eureka	32302
K48GP	48	California	Eureka	18564
K50EQ	50	California	Eureka	32226
K57HB	57	California	Eureka	60446
K59FW	59	California	Eureka	41551
K63GK	63	California	Eureka	32218
W08DM	8	Georgia	Colquitt	19713
W22BV	22	Georgia	Colquitt	28030
W26BM	26	Georgia	Colquitt	18565
K51FJ	51	Iowa	Ottumwa	15336
K53FC	53	Iowa	Ottumwa	10377
K55GS	55	Iowa	Ottumwa	40269
K58ER	58	Iowa	Ottumwa	7943
K65GA	65	Iowa	Ottumwa	39706
K67GH	67	Iowa	Ottumwa	32252
K40GO	40	Iowa	Waterloo	60447
W48CU	48	Illinois	Champaign/Urbana	32301
W15CT	15	Illinois	Quincy	32238
W17DD	17	Illinois	Quincy	32219
W19DI	19	Illinois	Quincy	30250
W20CU	20	Illinois	Quincy	40274
W36BS	36	Illinois	Quincy	40270
W45BM	45	Illinois	Quincy	27649
W49BS	49	Illinois	Quincy	36162
W51EI	51	Illinois	Quincy	19712
W16BI	16	Kentucky	Talbert	70677
W20BO	20	Kentucky	Talbert	869
W24BT	24	Kentucky	Talbert	37071
W26BK	26	Kentucky	Talbert	5034
W31BU	31	Kentucky	Talbert	32259
W51CK	51	Kentucky	Talbert	31505
W53BQ	53	Kentucky	Talbert	36101
W54CI	54	Kentucky	Talbert	40272
W64CM	64	Kentucky	Talbert	55230
W66DA	66	Kentucky	Talbert	32854
W69ED	69	Kentucky	Talbert	74411
W39CC	39	Maine	Bangor	60448
W42BZ	42	Maine	Bangor	15288
W50BX	50	Maine	Bangor	16293
W54CG	54	Maine	Bangor	72483
W58CM	58	Maine	Bangor	30249
W66CL	66	Maine	Bangor	32255
W36BZ	19	Michigan	Cadillac	26195
W18CB	18	Michigan	Houghton	36745
W21BS	21	Michigan	Houghton	40087
W24CG	24	Michigan	Houghton	30203
W31BN	31	Michigan	Houghton	57411
W36CE	36	Michigan	Houghton	57412
W50CD	50	Michigan	Houghton	30204
W52CO	52	Michigan	Houghton	65274
W55CH	55	Michigan	Houghton	65275
W57CQ	57	Michigan	Houghton	30865
W59DC	59	Michigan	Houghton	30866
W61CS	61	Michigan	Houghton	30864
W63CH	63	Michigan	Houghton	30863
W65DJ	65	Michigan	Houghton	15346
W67DN	67	Michigan	Houghton	26295
W34BZ	34	Michigan	Ludington	30862
W48BY	48	Michigan	Ludington	57408
W18BX	18	Michigan	Petoskey	16002
W20BQ	20	Michigan	Petoskey	57413
W23BM	23	Michigan	Petoskey	36759
W25CD	25	Michigan	Petoskey	30867
W31BI	31	Michigan	Petoskey	3918
W36CD	36	Michigan	Petoskey	15344
W39CB	39	Michigan	Petoskey	15345
W51CR	51	Michigan	Petoskey	57410
W53BN	53	Michigan	Petoskey	59391
W55CL	55	Michigan	Petoskey	59390
W57CP	57	Michigan	Petoskey	961
W62CR	62	Michigan	Petoskey	26260
W64CK	64	Michigan	Petoskey	30029
W66CY	66	Michigan	Petoskey	31506
W68DH	68	Michigan	Petoskey	39303
W52CB	52	Michigan	Sault Ste. Marie	15995
W21BN	21	Michigan	Sault Ste. Marie	15343
W32BN	32	Michigan	Sault Ste. Marie	16588
W36BV	36	Michigan	Sault Ste. Marie	40112
W39BY	39	Michigan	Sault Ste. Marie	40113
W48BZ	48	Michigan	Sault Ste. Marie	15992
W50CA	50	Michigan	Sault Ste. Marie	15993
W56DI	56	Michigan	Sault Ste. Marie	15996
W58CO	58	Michigan	Sault Ste. Marie	15994
W15BM	15	Michigan	Traverse City	63307
W23BL	23	Michigan	Traverse City	26193
W34CE	34	Michigan	Traverse City	26196
W48CC	48	Michigan	Traverse City	3219
W52CP	52	Michigan	Traverse City	3220
W56DF	56	Michigan	Traverse City	3218
W58CN	58	Michigan	Traverse City	36760
W62CQ	62	Michigan	Traverse City	36761
W66CX	66	Michigan	Traverse City	57379
W68DD	68	Michigan	Traverse City	57380
K52HH	52	Minnesota	Rochester	38509
K33EQ	33	Missouri	Cape Girardeau	17405
K47FB	47	Missouri	Cape Girardeau	31578
K55HL	55	Missouri	Cape Girardeau	19445
K58FD	58	Missouri	Cape Girardeau	57008
K65GP	65	Missouri	Cape Girardeau	6757
K67HF	67	Missouri	Cape Girardeau	24098
K69HT	69	Missouri	Cape Girardeau	57009
K04OV	4	Missouri	Joplin	26154
K52FC	52	Missouri	Joplin	64406
K55HU	55	Missouri	Joplin	30586
W12CR	12	Mississippi	Grenada	32300
W28BP	28	Mississippi	Grenada	57007
W36BT	36	Mississippi	Grenada	15379
W41BV	41	Mississippi	Grenada	72545
W46CK	46	Mississippi	Grenada	55274
W53CE	53	Mississippi	Laurel	39328
W20BS	20	Mississippi	Meridian	22429
W26BR	26	Mississippi	Meridian	26293
W27DD	27	Mississippi	Meridian	39327
W35CQ	35	Mississippi	Meridian	31525
W36BY	36	Mississippi	Meridian	31526
W46CL	46	Mississippi	Meridian	31523
W52CS	52	Mississippi	Meridian	31524
W54CD	54	Mississippi	Meridian	31527
W59DE	59	Mississippi	Meridian	39330
W65DE	65	Mississippi	Meridian	57542
W69DJ	69	Mississippi	Meridian	57544
W49BK	49	Mississippi	Tupelo	74412
K57IP	57	Oklahoma	Tulsa	27647
W14BW	14	Tennessee	Acton	24304
W20BJ	20	Tennessee	Acton	37493
W27CL	27	Tennessee	Acton	37069
W32BG	32	Tennessee	Acton	70874
W34BU	34	Tennessee	Acton	37070
W43BH	43	Tennessee	Acton	5033
W46CE	46	Tennessee	Acton	72556
W56DA	56	Tennessee	Acton	18154
W62CK	62	Tennessee	Acton	15333
W66CG	66	Tennessee	Acton	33441
W69DB	69	Tennessee	Acton	849
W26CJ	26	Tennessee	Clarksville	74410
W22BR	22	Tennessee	Jackson	30268
W25BY	25	Tennessee	Jackson	38506
W38BY	38	Tennessee	Jackson	24729
W46CG	46	Tennessee	Jackson	38507
W52CZ	52	Tennessee	Jackson	5047
W54BU	54	Tennessee	Jackson	28642
W62CJ	62	Tennessee	Jackson	26259
W64BZ	64	Tennessee	Jackson	32253
W06BU	6	Wisconsin	Whiting	57860
W16AY	16	Wisconsin	Whiting	56194
W18CS	18	Wisconsin	Whiting	63274
W24BV	24	Wisconsin	Whiting	15759
W31CI	31	Wisconsin	Whiting	36099
W40BC	40	Wisconsin	Whiting	22382
W60CI	60	Wisconsin	Whiting	8019
W62DA	62	Wisconsin	Whiting	24730
