= Iverson Park =

Park in Wisconsin, United States

- Location within Wisconsin
- Location: US Hwy 10, Stevens Point, Wisconsin
- Coordinates: 44°31′12″N 89°32′19″W
- Opened: 1926
- Public transit: Central Transportation

Iverson Park is a recreational park course that lies on the green circle trail and Plover River in Stevens Point, Wisconsin. It spans over 100 acres, and contains a swimming area, hiking trails, as well as canoe and recreation activities rental. It is also known as the Plover Hills.

== History ==
=== Stevens Point Purchases the Stevens Point Water Company ===
Development of the park began after the city constructed water pumping facilities for the city where highway 10 crosses the Plover River. Before the creation of the park, swimming was popular in the river at areas called Red Bridge and The Stumps. Prior to this time, the city got its drinking water from a private company called the Stevens Point Water Company. The water was originally being pumped from the Wisconsin River, but the quality of the water was questionable. The city then took action to ensure both clean drinking water and a safer swimming environment, approving the purchase of the private Stevens Point Water Company on January 3, 1922. New pumping facilities obtained water from the Plover River through a pipeline to the water plant in downtown Stevens Point. Purchase of the Stevens Point Water Company finished on July 1, 1922. The city, revitalized by its clean source of water, adapted the slogan "the City of Wonderful Water."

=== Park Developments After Purchase ===
In the winter between 1922 and 1923, the Water Commission constructed a sandstone pump house in the park to house the two electric water pumps. The building, now used for storage, has the design that would be featured in all buildings within the park. After the pump house was created, the Stevens Point citizens began discussing the plan to develop some of the 43 acres into a municipal swimming beach and park. The city attempted to create a bird refuge, but this did not gain traction. After this, in April 1926, the Stevens Point Water Commission began improvement projects around the area of the pump house to create a public park area. By August of the same year, the construction crew had cleared both sides of the river, leaving some trees on either side for shade. A beach with shallow water was created for younger children, with a deeper area approximately 200 yards away for older children. By the summer of 1927, two bath houses along with a parking area were constructed, and several picnic tables were placed under the trees surrounding the water. Stone pillars on the entrance were created, as well as a wall along the bank of the river to prevent erosion of the soil. A bridge was created to span the river, and two spring boards were attached to it. At this time the beach had its first employed lifeguard by the name of William Rellaban. Electric flood lights and lampposts were also constructed. All of the constructed buildings have been renovated and are still currently maintained.

=== Officially Named Robertson Park ===
The newly created park was known by many names, including Redbridge Park, Plover Hills Park, and the New Waterworks Park. On June 6, 1929, the Water Commission officially named the area Robertson Park, in honor of Edward B. Robertson, the president of the Water Commission, who had first envisioned transforming the area into a playground for Stevens Point residents. In 1930, the American Legion started offering free bus travel to the park for area residents. Traffic along the nearby highway increased. In 1933, B. L. Vaughan’s Sons was contracted to excavate along the east bank of the Plover River to double the capacity of the swimming pool.

=== Stevens Point Acquires Robertson Park from State Water Commission ===
In April 1934, the State Public Service Commission declared that it was illegal for the Water Commission to continue expending water department funds for park recreation purposes. Approximately $2,500 a year was required to maintain and improve the park. The Water Commission requested that the City of Stevens Point take over all responsibility for the maintenance and improvement of Robertson Park. The City Council approved this request, and the maintenance of Robertson Park became the duty of the city manager. A parks department was created with a budget not to exceed $3,500. After this, the city of Stevens Point continued with park improvements. A modern bathhouse, a dam to control water levels, multiple rustic bridges over small channels, and a cooking fireplace were all constructed by June 1936. One of the bridges was iconic for the park, and was featured on many postcards and magazines. The bridge has deteriorated, but another bridge was constructed in 1973 the same rustic arch style.

=== Donation of land from Jules Iverson ===
As the highway near the park increased in traffic, the American Legion of Stevens Point grew worried of the dangers from children crossing the road. The city proposed to buy land south of the current park that was adjacent to it. This would allow the park entrance to be moved onto a local street which would be safer and easier to access. The land proposed to be purchased was owned by a woman named Mrs. Theresa Green, who was willing to sell it for $5,000. The city couldn't afford the price. A man named Jules Iverson was able to afford this price, however. Jules was an immigrant from Denmark, and owned a Jewelry and watch repair store in downtown Stevens Point. After investing in land, he found himself to be one of the wealthiest men in the city, and was known for donating to public works projects. In June 1935, Jules purchased the 63 acres from Mrs. Green and then donated it to the city of Stevens Point. According to a Stevens Point Daily Journal article on June 24, 1935:

"This is not the first time Mr. Iverson has manifested this generous spirit. Often in recent years he has contributed liberally to various public projects and frequently has been the sole sponsor of causes for the especial benefit of children. He has not been satisfied to be merely a “good citizen.” Under his philosophy it is the duty as well as the privilege of the citizen to share with his community the fruits of material success."

This donation increased the park's size to over 100 acres. The newly donated land was named Jules Iverson Memorial Park. For several years after the donation, however, the adjacent 43 acres developed by the water commission was still referred to as Robertson Park.

=== Works Progress Administration ===
During the Great Depression Franklin Delano Roosevelt created the Works Progress Administration (WPA) to complete public projects and create jobs. The WPA benefited Iverson Park. In July and August 1935, the Stevens Point City Council authorized the use of WPA funding for a number of projects: dredging the Plover River and filling low areas in Iverson Park and brushing in Iverson Park, erecting a stone memorial to Jules Iverson, remodeling the bathhouses, and constructing shelters and a toilet building. Between 1936 and 1938, many structures were built inside the park, including multiple bathhouses, multiple stone bridges, additional pump houses, and stone shelters for public gatherings. All of the structures constructed during this time still stand today. By the end of 1938, the swimming area was moved south of the original site in order to create a larger swimming area. The main construction of buildings was completed by 1940, as the WPA was dissolved due to World War II

== Current features and Future Park Plans ==
Iverson park remains in operation. A toboggan run and sled hills created in the 1940s continue to be maintained in functioning order. Also, construction of a Winter Recreational Facility includes an ice rink. Stevens Point has issued statements saying the city is committed to maintaining the park, and the community has also approved referendums that have allowed for increased spending to keep the park functioning. Areas in the park are available to rent out in order to provide income for the parks department.
