= Chambers Creek =

Chambers Creek may refer to:

- Chambers Creek (Tennessee River tributary), a stream in Tennessee
- Chambers Creek (Richland Creek tributary), a stream in Texas
- Chambers Creek (Washington)
