= John M. Noel =

American entrepreneur and philanthropist (born 1948)

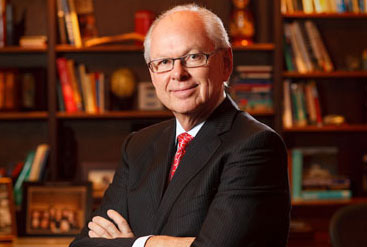
Travel Guard founder and American philanthropist, John M. Noel.

John M. Noel (born February 26, 1948 - died September 30, 2026) was an American entrepreneur and philanthropist best known for founding Travel Guard International, the world's largest travel insurer and a division of the American International Group subsidiary, Chartis.

Noel was the president of Berkshire Hathaway Travel Protection until he stepped down in 2015, and former chairman and CEO of the Noel Group, a family of worldwide companies and investments located in Stevens Point, Wisconsin.

== Business career ==
In 1982, Noel developed the travel-insurance concept while working at Sentry Insurance. Noel purchased the rights to the product concept, worked with travel agents on its development, and by 1985 Travel Guard was operating out of the basement of Noel's home. When the company was sold to AIG in 2006, Travel Guard was producing nearly $250M in annual gross premium. Noel remained as Travel Guard's CEO until 2009, exceeding revenue and profitability goals over the three years from the sale of the company to his departure. During that time, Noel also helped create an errors-and-omissions insurance product for the travel industry. After selling Travel Guard, Noel collected the other companies he had founded or purchased and gathered them under the Noel Group umbrella. Noel Group companies have included the travel agency Marathon Travel; MultiNational Underwriters, a medical-insurance carrier for travelers and expatriates; My Assist, a personal-assistance, mobile-telematics, and data-collection service; Compass Properties, a property-management firm; and Insure America, an insurance company serving travel agents. Noel Group sold MultiNational Underwriters to HCC Insurance Holdings in 2009. In 2016, Noel was inducted into the Wisconsin Business Hall of Fame.

== Sale of Noel Group assets to Berkshire Hathaway ==
Berkshire Hathaway Specialty Insurance President, Peter Eastwood, and Executive Vice President, Property and Programs, Sanjay Godhwani, join Noel at the Noel Group headquarters.

On Jan. 27, 2014, it was announced that Berkshire Hathaway Specialty Insurance had signed an agreement with Noel Group to purchase the assets of MyAssist and Insure America. The purchase allows BHSI to offer its customers 24-hour global personal assistance, virtual-concierge and connected vehicle service as well as travel-industry liability insurance. All operations of the company remain in Stevens Point.

== Philanthropic efforts ==
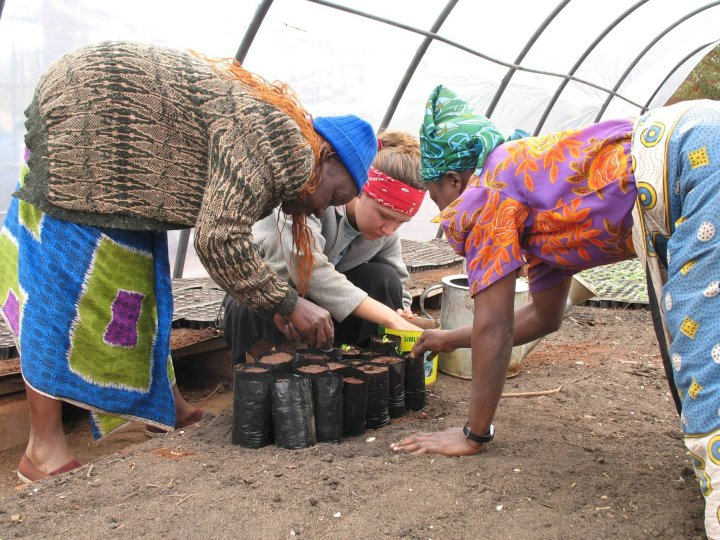
Trees 4 Children volunteers plant melia trees in Kenya.

In 1993, John and his wife, Patty, established the Make A Mark Foundation. Partners donate time, abilities, and finances to build clinics, schools, and orphanages in developing countries worldwide, with a focus on AIDS orphans in sub-Saharan Africa. Make A Mark created Nyumbani Village in Kitui, Kenya, in 1993, making it the largest orphanage of its kind in the world. The village houses almost 1,000 AIDS orphans along with grandparents who also lost children to AIDS. Noel worked with the Kenyan government to create Nyumbani using a self-sustaining model that employs the melia tree to produce lumber and generate revenue and food forests to provide fruits and vegetables to eat and sell. The food-forest effort is a project of Trees 4 Children, a Make A Mark initiative that applies business solutions to problems of sustainability and subsistence. Make A Mark is expanding the Trees 4 Children model to villages around the world.

In Wisconsin, the Noels co-founded the local Boys and Girls Club, are major benefactors of the University of Wisconsin-Stevens Point and have helped launch seed schools in Milwaukee and other urban areas. In recognition of their philanthropic endeavors, the Noels were awarded the Franklin Covey Humanitarian Service Award, given to “outstanding individuals who reach out to improve the quality of life for individuals, groups or humankind.” They have also received the Stevens Point Area Public School District Community Service Recognition Award and the William C. Hansen Distinguished Service Award, and have been recognized for their contributions to Nyumbani Village.

In October, 2009 at the State of Wisconsin Area Council Conference in Milwaukee, John Noel was awarded the prestigious "President’s Volunteer Service Award" for his volunteer work associated with the Boys & Girls Clubs of Portage County. An initiative of the President's Council on Service and Civic Participation, the President's Volunteer Service Award is issued on behalf of the President of the United States to recognize the best in American spirit, and to encourage all Americans to improve their communities through volunteer service and civic participation. Established in 2003, this award was created by President George W. Bush to give Presidential recognition to individuals, families and groups who meet requirements for volunteer service, measured by the number of service hours performed over 12-months.

== University of Wisconsin-Stevens Point ==
Noel received a bachelor's degree from University of Wisconsin–Stevens Point (UWSP) in 1971. He was named UWSP "Alumni of the Year” in 1999, and the university's new performing-arts center was dedicated as the Noel Fine Arts Center in 2006. Noel is an emeritus member of the UWSP Foundation board. In 1996, the Noels established the Noel Compass Scholarship Program to provide a UWSP education for low-income, high-achieving students from Wisconsin's urban communities. The program includes room, board tuition, and a paid internship at Noel Group. There are more than 30 Compass Scholar college graduates. Currently, there are 7 students in the program. On May 21, 2016, the Noels each received honorary Doctor of Humane Letters degrees bestowed by the University of Wisconsin-Stevens Point.

== Family ==
John met his wife, Patty when they were 14, and were married while they were in college. They have six children. Two are their natural children and four were adopted. As he was building Travel Guard, Noel became a supporter and adherent of Stephen Covey, author of The Seven Habits of Highly Effective People. Noel later became a graduate of and facilitator at the Covey Leadership Center, and contributed a chapter to Covey's book Living the Seven Habits. Noel continues to sponsor Seven Habits training for all Noel Group employees.
