= World Nomads =

Australian travel insurance brand

- Type: Private
- Industry: Insurance
- Founded: 2002; 24 years ago in Sydney, Australia
- Founder: Simon Monk
- Headquarters: Sydney, Australia
- Area served: Worldwide
- Website: worldnomads.com

World Nomads is an Australian travel insurance brand based in Sydney.

== History ==
World Nomads originated from the worldnomads.com, which founder Simon Monk registered in 1997 as a personal travel site. Monk has said that in 2000 he was approached by Wayne Tregaskis and Michael McAuliffe to help build an online travel insurance service for independent travellers, and the business launched in 2002. In 2007, World Nomad publicly launched its online charity application called Footprints. Footprints was originally developed in 2005.

In July 2015, nib Holdings acquired World Nomads Group for about A$95 million. At the time of acquisition, it was the third largest travel insurance brand in Australia.

In April 2019, World Nomads Group renamed as nib Travel, while retaining consumer brands including World Nomads, Travel Insurance Direct, nib, and SureSave. In February 2026, International Medical Group acquired the international World Nomads brand from nib.

== See also ==
- Heymondo
- Travel Guard
