= Anton C. Krembs =

American businessman and politician

Anton C. Krembs (April 14, 1879 – February 19, 1938) was an American businessman and politician.

Born in Stevens Point, Wisconsin, Krembs went to the parochial schools and to high school in Stevens Point. He went to Stevens Point Normal School and then graduated from the University of Notre Dame. Krembs was involved with the family hardware business: the Krembs Hardware Company. He served as secretary of the Stevens Point Police and Fire Commission. In 1915, Krembs served in the Wisconsin State Assembly and was a Democrat. Krembs died from a stroke at his home in Park Ridge, Wisconsin.
