= Stevens Point Area Public School District =

Public school district in Wisconsin

Stevens Point Area Public School

Location
- 1900 Polk Street; Stevens Point, Wisconsin 54481 Portage County, Wisconsin United States

District information
- Type: Public
- Grades: Pre-K – 12th
- Superintendent: Cory Hirsbrunner

Other information
- Website: www.pointschools.net

Stevens Point Area Public School District is a public school district centered in Stevens Point, Wisconsin. It serves the city of Stevens Point, the villages of Junction City, Milladore, Plover and Whiting; and surrounding towns. It includes one high school, one alternative high school, one 7-12 charter school, two junior high schools and nine elementary schools. Its superintendent is Cory Hirsbrunner.

== Schools ==
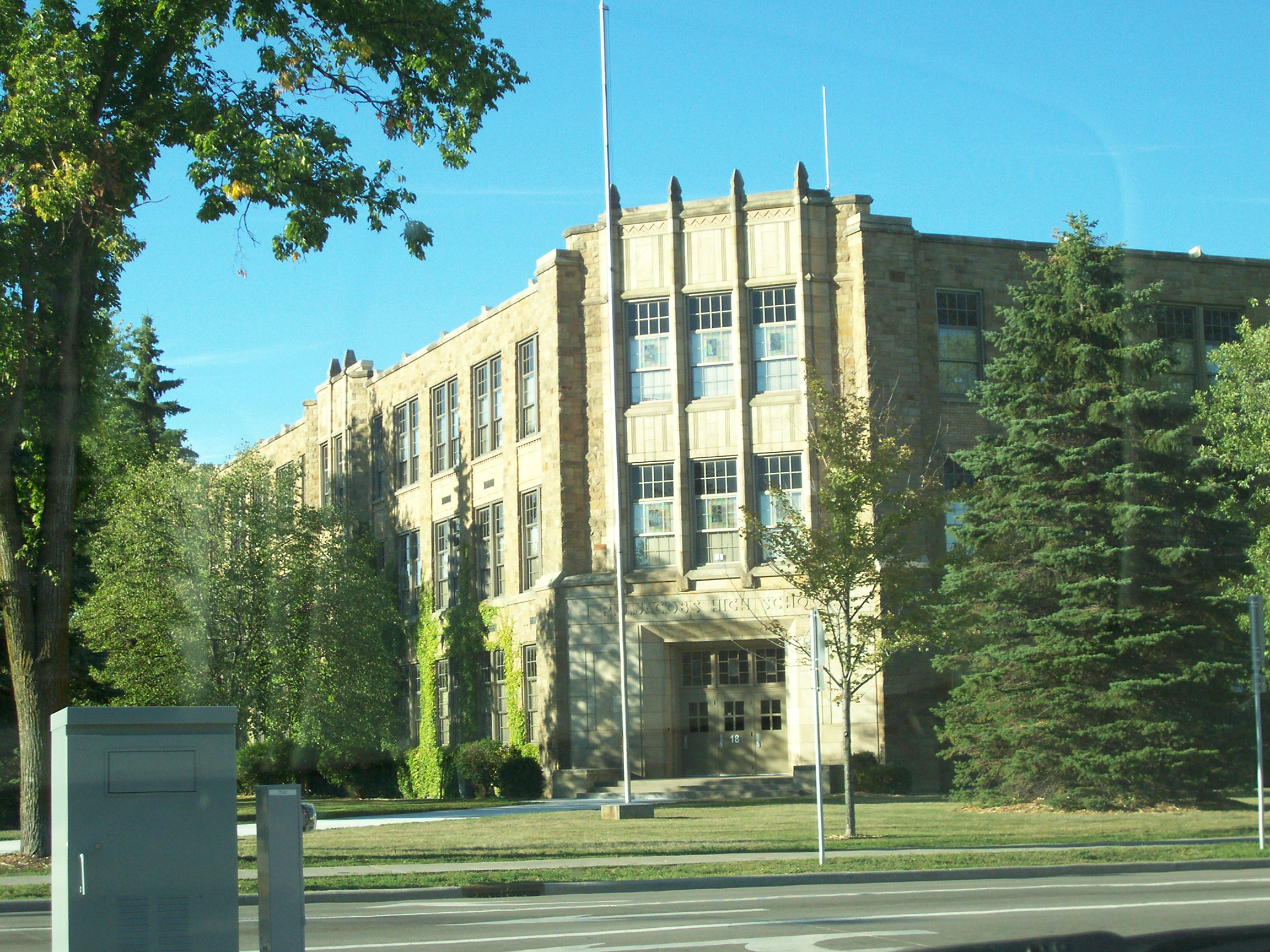
P.J. Jacobs Junior High School

=== High school ===
- Stevens Point Area Senior High School

=== Alternative High school ===
- Charles F. Fernandez Center

=== Junior high schools ===
- Ben Franklin Junior High School
- P.J. Jacobs Junior High School

=== Charter schools ===
- Point of Discovery School (PODS)

=== Elementary schools ===
- Roosevelt IDEA Elementary
- Bannach Elementary School
- Kennedy Elementary School
- Madison Elementary School
- McDill Elementary School
- Plover-Whiting Elementary School
- Washington Elementary School
- McKinley Center
- Jefferson Elementary School

=== Specialized Facilities ===
- 4K Program
- Boston School Forest
- Online Learning Center (OLC)
- Project Search
- Rural Virtual Academy
- Summer School

== Notable Events ==
In December 2019 Jo Pang, a teacher at P.J. Jacobs Middle School, was arrested for sexual assault of a minor. On December 20, 2019, three days after his arrest, he resigned from his position. His trial ended in February 2021, where he plead no contest and was sentenced to four years in prison.

In late August 2024 there was a break in at the Boston School Forest (BSF) in Plover, Wisconsin. The BSF is an environmental education site owned and operated by the Stevens Point Area School District. Students attend field trips to the BSF every year up to 10th grade to receive education relating to the natural world. No individual or group of individuals have been charged in the break in to date. According to Portage County Sheriff, Mike Lucas, the damages to the property by the burglars were approximately valued at $4,000. The damages included the theft of archery bows and arrows, damage to living trees, building break-ins, sliced screens, and broken materials.

In July 2026, SPASH girls track and field coach and former NCAA Division 3 National Champion, Isaac Vazquez, was arrest for child grooming. On July 9, 2026, police interviewed the victim and reviewed messages they had received from Vazquez through Snapchat. He first began coaching with the school district in March 2018, and the district confirmed that his was no longer employed with the district after July 5, 2026.
