= McMillan Memorial Library =

McMillan Memorial Library may refer to:

- McMillan Memorial Library, Nairobi
- McMillan Memorial Library, Wisconsin
