= Nathan LaFayette =

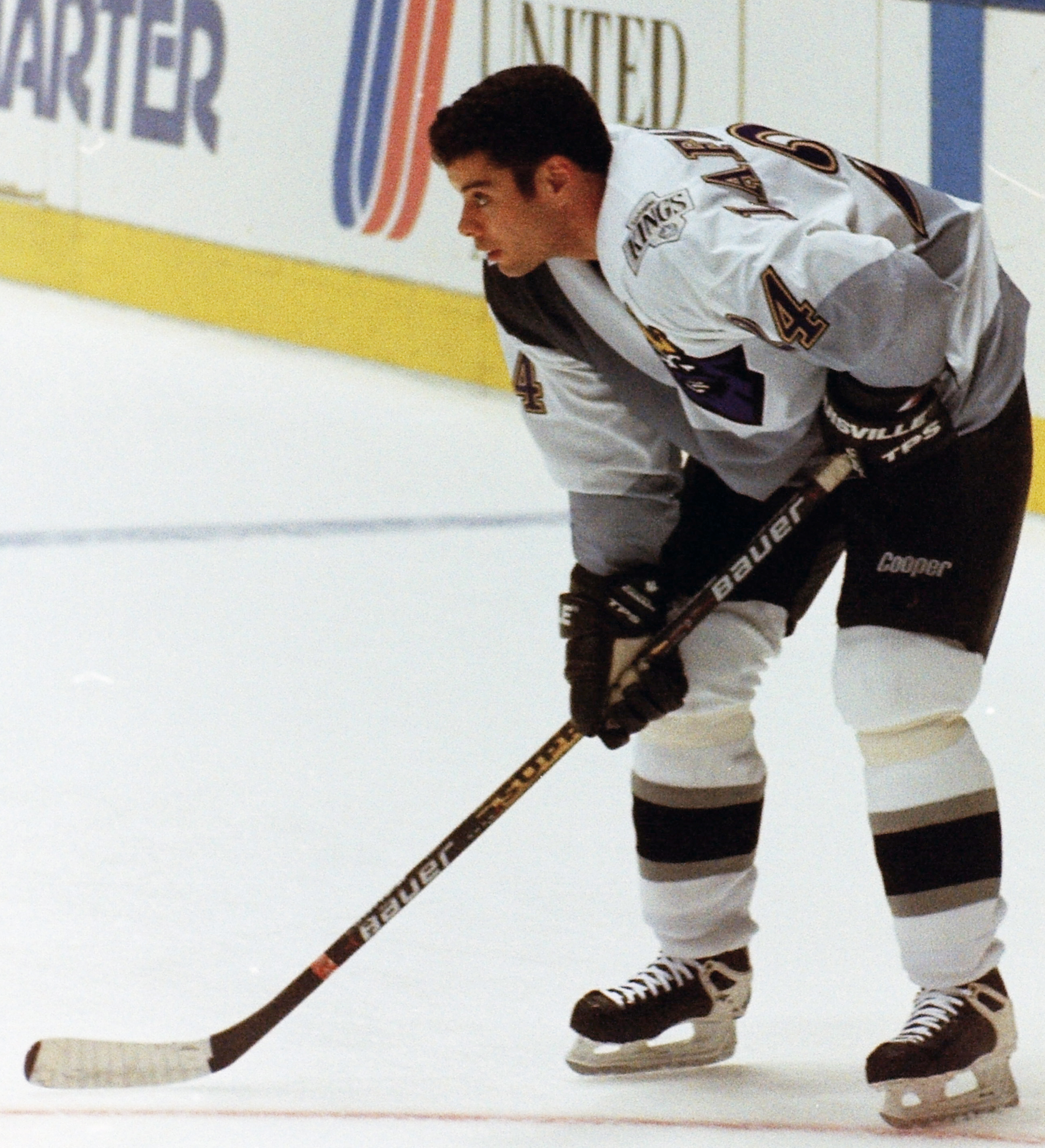
- LaFayette with the Los Angeles Kings in 1996
- Born: February 17, 1973 (age 53) New Westminster, British Columbia, Canada
- Height: 6 ft 1 in (185 cm)
- Weight: 190 lb (86 kg; 13 st 8 lb)
- Position: Centre
- Shot: Right
- Played for: St. Louis Blues; Vancouver Canucks; New York Rangers; Los Angeles Kings
- NHL draft: 65th overall, 1991; St. Louis Blues
- Playing career: 1993–2000

Nathan LaFayette (born February 17, 1973) is a Canadian former ice hockey player in the National Hockey League (NHL). He was drafted by the St. Louis Blues in the third round (65th overall) of the 1991 NHL entry draft. He played for the St. Louis Blues, Vancouver Canucks, New York Rangers, and Los Angeles Kings. He played 187 regular season NHL games and scored 9 points in 20 playoff games.

== Playing career ==
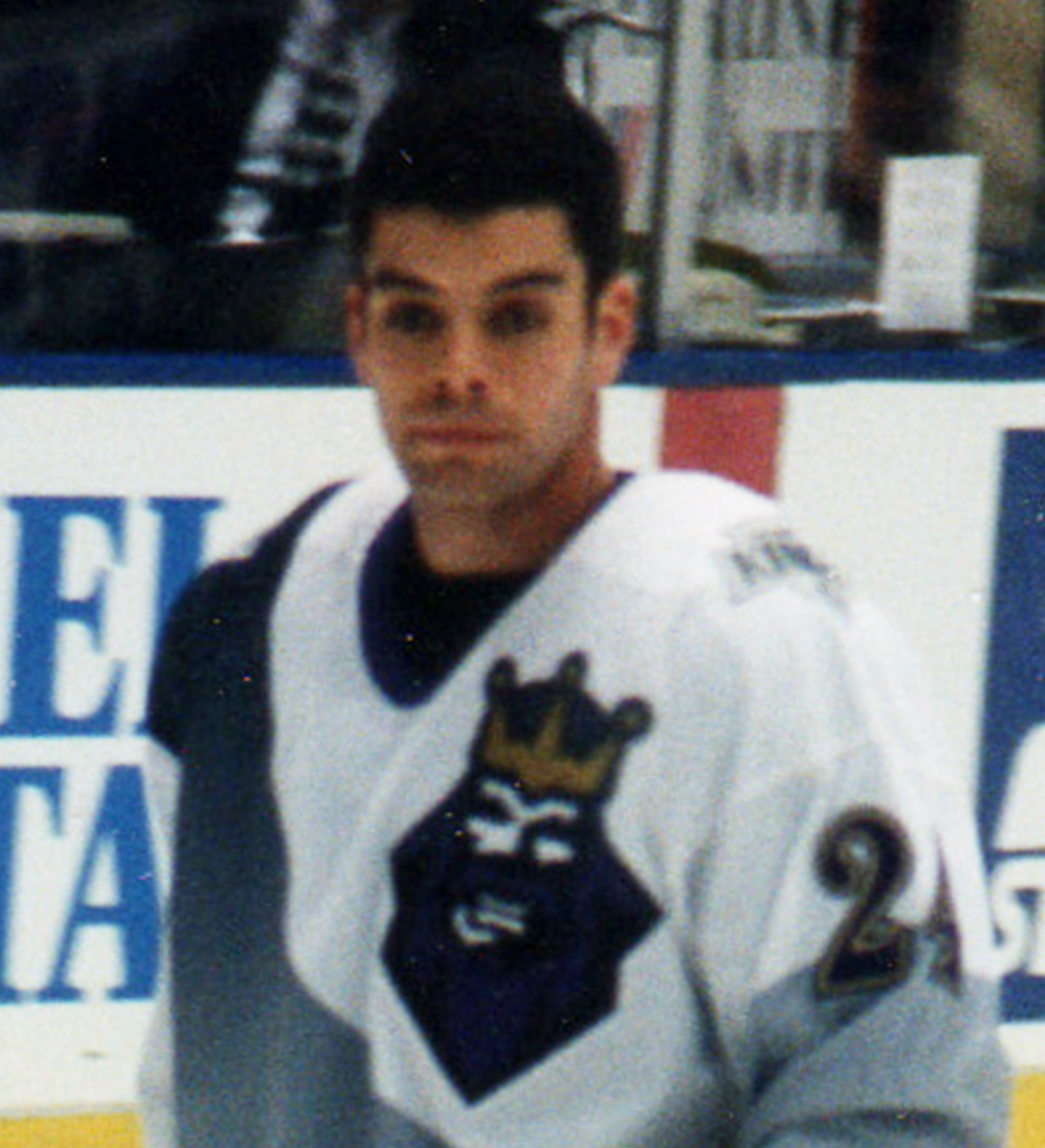
LaFayette as a member of the Los Angeles Kings

On April 10, 2008, LaFayette was interviewed on the Team 1040 BMac & Rintoul sports radio morning show on the "Where are they now" feature. He stated that due to injuries, his career was cut short.

=== Amateur ===
Lafayette was the CHL Scholastic Player of the Year in the 1991–92 season, while he was a member of the Cornwall Royals. He also played for the Kingston Frontenacs (1989–90, 1990–91) and the Newmarket Royals (1992–93), all of the OHL. His best year as an amateur came in 1992-93 when he scored 49 goals for the Newmarket Royals and helped Canada win the gold medal at the World Junior Championships.

=== Professional ===
LaFayette was drafted by the St. Louis Blues in the third round (65th overall) of the 1991 NHL entry draft. He scored his first NHL point, an assist, on January 14, 1994 vs. the Edmonton Oilers setting up a two-on-one for Craig Janney and Brendan Shanahan, and Shanahan scored the goal. The Blues had intended for LaFayette to play at their minor league affiliate, the Peoria Rivermen, for the whole season, but due to injuries, he played 38 NHL games with the Blues before being traded.

On March 21, 1994, LaFayette was traded with teammates Bret Hedican and Jeff Brown to the Vancouver Canucks in exchange for the rights to Craig Janney. After sitting out the first four playoff games for Vancouver, he recorded nine points in the next 20 games. He tied his Vancouver Canuck teammate, Bret Hedican, for the +/- lead in the 1994 playoffs with a total of +13. He remains best known as the player who hit the post in the final minutes of the 1994 Final between the Rangers and the Canucks in game seven.

On April 7, 1995, Lafayette was traded to the New York Rangers for goaltender Corey Hirsch. He played five games with the Rangers, while playing 57 games with their minor league affiliate, the Binghamton Rangers.

On March 14, 1996, LaFayette was again part of a blockbuster trade, going to the Los Angeles Kings with Ray Ferraro, Ian Laperrière, Mattias Norstrom and the Rangers' 1997 4th round pick (99th overall - Sean Blanchard), in exchange for Jari Kurri, Marty McSorley, and Shane Churla. During his time there, he played right wing as well as center. Lafayette suspects that he suffered two concussions in one game with the Los Angeles Kings, which contributed to his hockey career being cut short. He retired in 1999 after splitting the season between the Kings and the Long Beach Ice Dogs.

== International play ==
In 1993, LaFayette won a gold medal at the 1993 World Junior Ice Hockey Championships, representing Canada.

Medal record

Ice hockey

Representing Canada

World Junior Championships
Gold medal – first place	1993 Sweden	

== Personal life ==
LaFayette was born in New Westminster, British Columbia, but grew up in Mississauga, Ontario.

After LaFayette retired from hockey in 2000, he joined Travel Guard Canada. The company, an arm of Travel Guard International, offered travel insurance plans to Canadian travellers. As of 2010, he resides in Oakville with his wife, Sherry and two children; a daughter, Piper and son, Hudson. He continues his work as an insurance executive.

== Career statistics ==
=== Regular season and playoffs ===
			Regular season					Playoffs
Season	Team	League	GP	G	A	Pts	PIM	GP	G	A	Pts	PIM
1988–89	Toronto Marlboros Midget AAA	GTHL	69	38	68	106	24	—	—	—	—	—
1988–89	Pickering Panthers	MetJHL	1	0	0	0	0	—	—	—	—	—
1989–90	Kingston Frontenacs	OHL	53	6	8	14	14	7	0	1	1	0
1990–91	Kingston Frontenacs	OHL	35	13	13	26	10	—	—	—	—	—
1990–91	Cornwall Royals	OHL	28	16	22	38	25	—	—	—	—	—
1991–92	Cornwall Royals	OHL	66	28	45	73	26	6	2	5	7	16
1992–93	Newmarket Royals	OHL	58	49	38	87	26	7	4	6	10	19
1993–94	Peoria Rivermen	IHL	27	13	11	24	20	—	—	—	—	—
1993–94	St. Louis Blues	NHL	38	2	3	5	14	—	—	—	—	—
1993–94	Vancouver Canucks	NHL	11	1	1	2	4	20	2	7	9	4
1994–95	Syracuse Crunch	AHL	27	9	9	18	10	—	—	—	—	—
1994–95	Vancouver Canucks	NHL	27	4	4	8	2	—	—	—	—	—
1994–95	New York Rangers	NHL	12	0	0	0	0	8	0	0	0	2
1995–96	Binghamton Rangers	AHL	57	21	27	48	32	—	—	—	—	—
1995–96	New York Rangers	NHL	5	0	0	0	2	—	—	—	—	—
1995–96	Los Angeles Kings	NHL	12	2	4	6	6	—	—	—	—	—
1996–97	Los Angeles Kings	NHL	15	1	3	4	8	—	—	—	—	—
1996–97	Phoenix Roadrunners	IHL	31	2	5	7	16	—	—	—	—	—
1996–97	Syracuse Crunch	AHL	26	14	11	25	18	3	1	0	1	2
1997–98	Fredericton Canadiens	AHL	28	7	8	15	36	—	—	—	—	—
1997–98	Los Angeles Kings	NHL	34	5	3	8	32	4	0	0	0	0
1998–99	Los Angeles Kings	NHL	33	2	2	4	35	—	—	—	—	—
1998–99	Long Beach Ice Dogs	IHL	41	9	13	22	24	7	1	0	1	8
1999–2000	Lowell Lock Monsters	AHL	42	7	15	22	33	—	—	—	—	—
IHL totals			99	24	29	53	60	7	1	0	1	8
NHL totals			187	17	20	37	103	32	2	7	9	8
AHL totals			180	58	70	128	129	3	1	0	1	2

=== International ===
Year	Team	Event	GP	G	A	Pts	PIM
1993	Canada	WJC	7	3	1	4	0

- All statistics are from eliteprospects.com

== Transactions ==
March 21, 1994: Traded to Vancouver by St. Louis with Jeff Brown and Bret Hedican for Craig Janney, March 21, 1994.

April 7, 1995: Traded to New York Rangers by Vancouver for Corey Hirsch, April 7, 1995.

March 14, 1996: Traded to Los Angeles Kings by New York Rangers with Ray Ferraro, Mattias Norstrom, Ian Laperrière and NY Rangers' fourth round choice (Sean Blanchard) in 1997 Entry Draft for Marty McSorley, Jari Kurri and Shane Churla, March 14, 1996

== Awards ==
=== OHL ===
Award	Year
OHL CHL Scholastic Player of the Year	1991–92
