= Acton, Tennessee =

Unincorporated community in McNairy County, Tennessee

Acton
- Unincorporated Community
- Interactive map of Acton
- Coordinates: 35°00′29″N 88°27′34″W
- Country: United States
- State: Tennessee
- County: McNairy
- Named for: Acton, England
- Postal code: 38357
- Area code: 731

Acton is an unincorporated community 3.7 miles (5.87 km) south of Michie in McNairy County, Tennessee, in the United States. It is believed that it is most likely named after Acton, England.

== History ==
Around the late 1820s to early 1830s, John Chambers purchased property in the Acton area and constructed a home. Chambers painted the house white to distinguish himself from others and the "White House" landmark was created. While the house no longer stands, the White House Cemetery around the site still stands. Acton was also the site of multiple Federal entrenchments by General Henry W. Halleck's forces as they planned the Siege of Corinth.

Between 1899 and 1904, Acton had a post office that conducted between Michie, Tennessee and Corinth, Mississippi. As early as 1913, the community of Acton had a schoolhouse operated by "Professor" J.G. King. By 1922, Acton's school was known as "Donald Springs School" and featured both a basketball and baseball team. In the past, Acton's economy primarily relied on agriculture, particularly with gin and corn. The community featured blacksmiths, mills and service shops throughout its history.

Until 1920, the community of Acton was legally labeled under "Donald Springs", based on the local water source that ran through the area.

== Geography and Infrastructure ==
Acton's community is primarily concentrated along Tennessee State Highway 22, north of Corinth, Mississippi and south of Michie, Tennessee. The community is 0.9 miles (1.5 km) from the Mississippi-Tennessee state line and 3.7 miles (5.87 km) from Michie.

The main water sources in the area are Chambers Creek and Donald Springs. The community relies on Michie as a local service center and Corinth as its predominant regional commercial hub.

== Notable Local People ==
- John Chambers, early southeastern McNairy pioneer settler.
- J.J. Abernathy, prominent local doctor and community chairman in McNairy County.
