= Portage County Public Library =

Coordinates: 44.523078°N 89.584087°W

The Portage County Public Library (PCPL) consists of four branch locations primarily serving the population of Portage County in central Wisconsin. The Main branch public library is located in downtown Stevens Point, WI. The other branches are located in Plover, Almond, and Rosholt. The PCPL is a member of the South Central Library System (SCLS). This membership allows for the sharing of resources between member libraries through a delivery service.

== Main branch ==
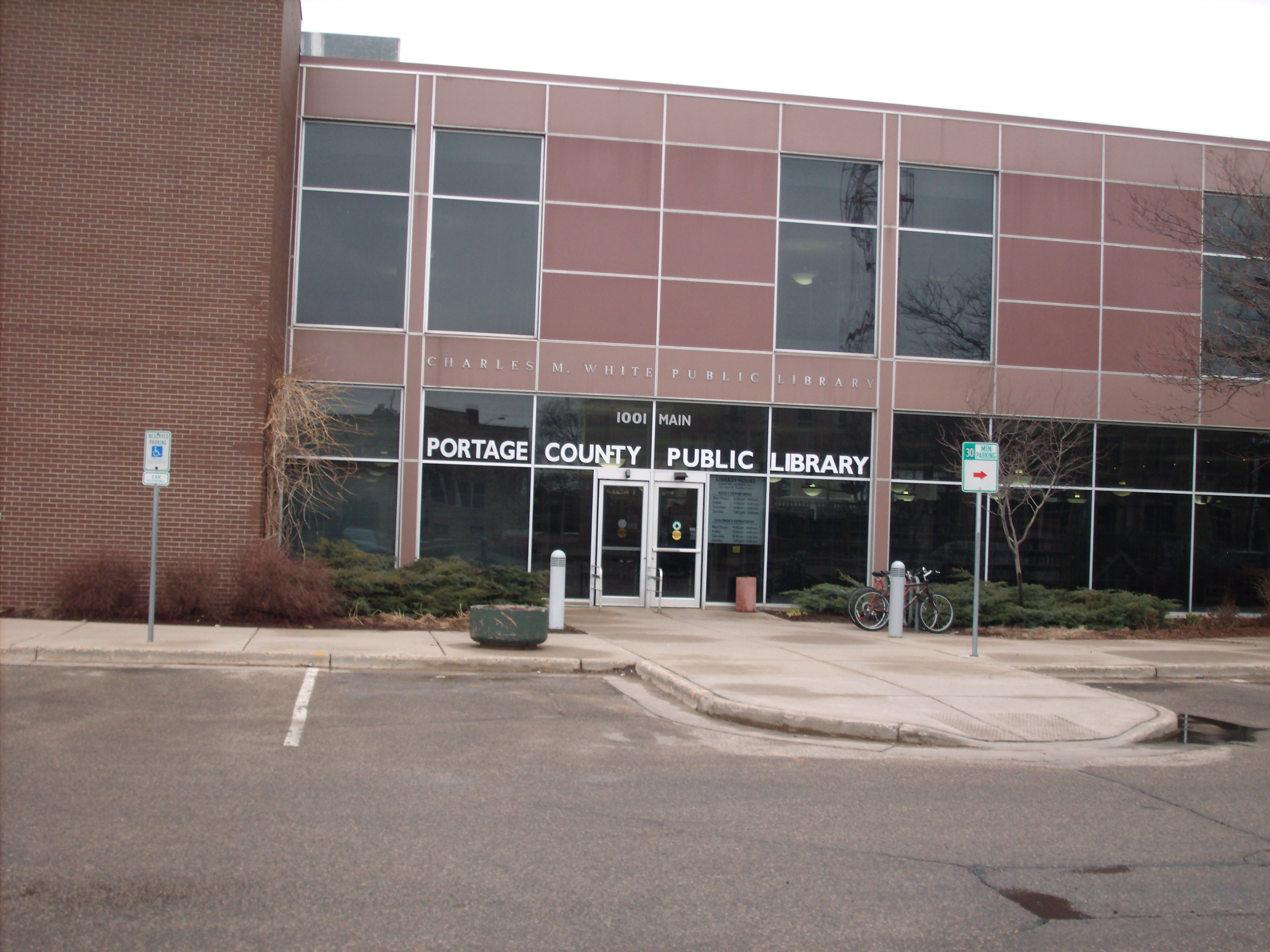
Clark Street Entrance of Portage County Public Library Main Branch

The Main branch is located at 1001 Main Street in Stevens Point. It is by far the largest of the four branches. The building is split into three floors with the basement containing the Children's Department, the 1st floor containing fiction, large print, compact discs, audiobooks, and DVD collections in addition to the circulation department, and the 2nd floor containing non-fiction, young adult, genealogy, newspaper and magazine, and board game collections in addition to the majority of the public internet computers.

=== Services ===
The Main Branch offers a wide variety of services, including programming for children and adults, a summer reading program for children and adults, meeting spaces, study rooms, laptops and multimedia projectors, and guest speakers. The library's circulation system is tied in with the University of Wisconsin–Stevens Point (UWSP) library to allow for reciprocal borrowing. In addition to this, the PCPL is able to request materials not immediately available through interlibrary loan (ILL). There is also free access to the Internet through one-hour computer sessions and wireless Internet.

== Other branches ==
The three other branches of the Portage County Public Library, while smaller in their size and capabilities in comparison to the Main Branch, provide vital services to areas of the county that may well otherwise not have access to library materials. Items circulate freely among the branches allowing users to request items from other branches for delivery to theirs via SCLS delivery service. This allows residents of Plover, Almond, Rosholt, and surrounding areas to enjoy the benefits of a large and diverse library collection that would otherwise prove difficult to access. Additionally, branches are fully capable of making use of Interlibrary Loan to further strengthen their services.

=== Plover Branch ===
The Plover Branch is located at 2151 Roosevelt Drive in the Village of Plover.

=== Almond Branch ===
The Almond Branch is located at 122 Main Street in Almond.

=== Rosholt Branch ===
The Rosholt Branch is located at 137 N. Main Street in Rosholt.
