= Stevens Point, Wisconsin =

City in Portage County, Wisconsin

- City
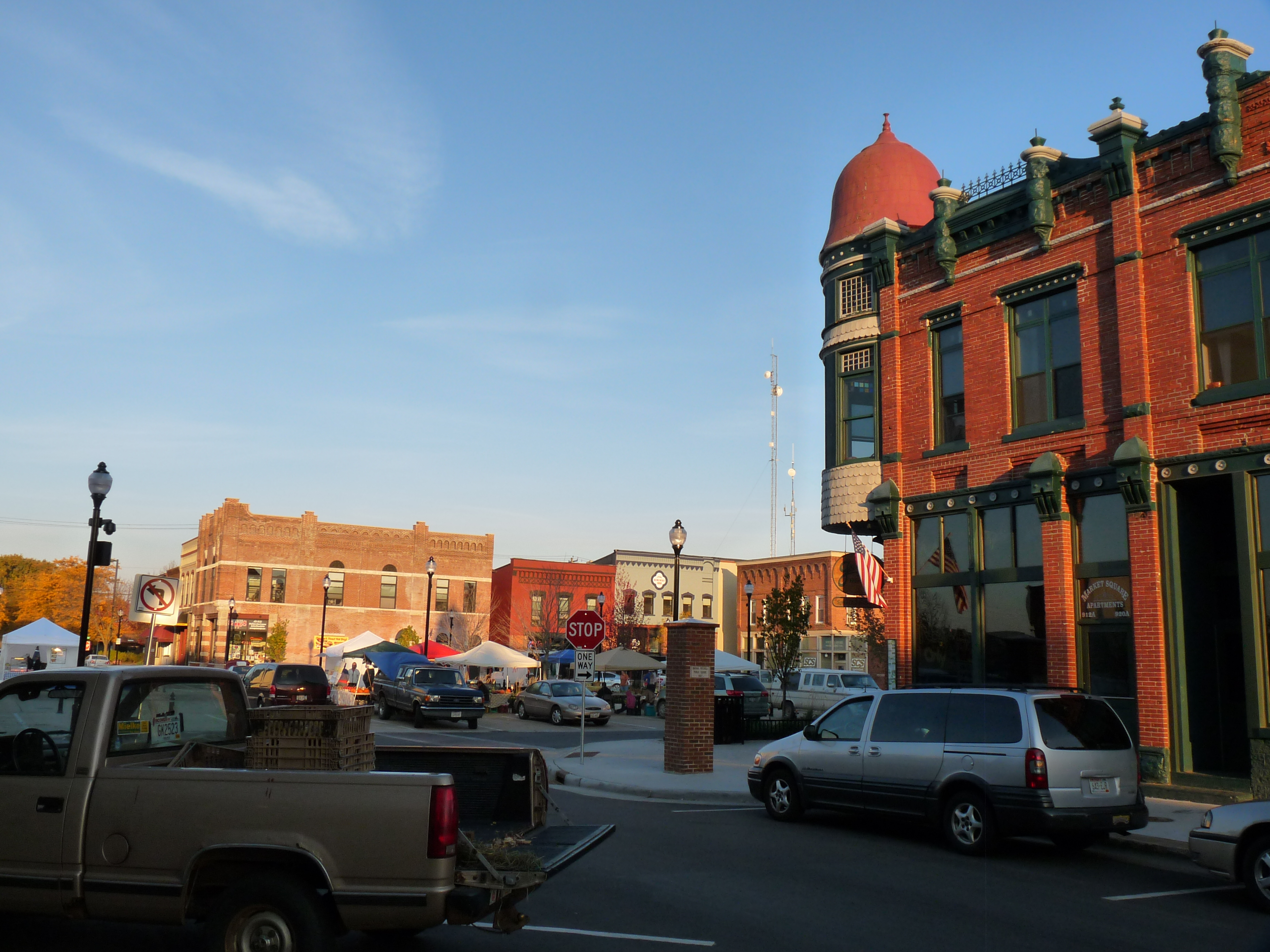
- Town square
- Nicknames: Gateway to the Pineries, City of Wonderful Water
- Location of Stevens Point in Portage County, Wisconsin.

- Location within Wisconsin Location within the United States
- Coordinates: 44°31′23″N 89°33′37″W
- Country: United States
- State: Wisconsin
- County: Portage
- Established: 1847

Government
  - Mayor: Mike Wiza

Area
  - City: 18.41 sq mi (47.68 km^{2})
  - Land: 17.17 sq mi (44.47 km^{2})
  - Water: 1.24 sq mi (3.21 km^{2})
- Elevation: 1,089 ft (332 m)

Population (2020)
  - City: 25,666
  - Density: 1,495.1/sq mi (577.3/km^{2})
  - Metro: 70,377
- Time zone: UTC−6 (CST)
  - Summer (DST): UTC−5 (CDT)
- ZIP code: 54481, 54482
- Area codes: 715 & 534
- FIPS code: 55-77200
- GNIS feature ID: 1574878
- Website: stevenspoint.com

Stevens Point is a city in Portage County, Wisconsin, United States, and its county seat. Its population was 25,666 at the 2020 census. It forms the core of the Stevens Point micropolitan statistical area, which had a population of 70,377 in 2020.

Stevens Point was incorporated in 1858. The city is home to the University of Wisconsin–Stevens Point and a campus of Mid-State Technical College.

== History ==
Historically part of the Menominee homelands, a three-mile strip along the Wisconsin River was ceded to the United States in an 1836 treaty. In 1854, the Menominee made its last treaty with the U.S., gathering on a reservation on the Wolf River. In the Menominee language, it is called Pasīpahkīhnen, which means "It juts out as land" or "point of land".

Stevens Point was named after George Stevens, who operated a grocery and supply business on the Wisconsin River during the extensive logging of interior Wisconsin. The river was used by logging companies to float logs to market. Loggers on the river found this a convenient stopping point, as the river bends slightly and the operation was from far upstream. The town developed from Stevens's post and was named for him.

In 1845, the postal service came to Stevens Point. With this improvement in communications, the population tripled within 20 years.

In 1847, the first plat was laid out of what became the City of Stevens Point, including the Public Square. The town square was originally an area next to the Wisconsin River where professionals, craftsmen, businessmen, and loggers gathered before their river journeys, bringing revenue to the area. As years went by, the area around the town square grew as logging increased.

Most buildings were first built with readily available wood. Many cases of early fires were reported from 1850–1890. Around 1880, buildings began to be built of brick and sandstone.

In 1916, Lyric Theater was built. It was demolished later.

== Geography ==
According to the United States Census Bureau, the city encompasses 18.41 square miles (47.7 km^{2}), including 17.17 square miles (44.5 km^{2}) of land 1.24 square miles (3.2 km^{2}) of water. The communities of Plover, Whiting and Park Ridge are adjacent to the city. The city's main hydrology includes the Wisconsin River to the west and the Plover River, which joins the Wisconsin from the northeast at a point to the south, and which supplies much of the urban area's water.

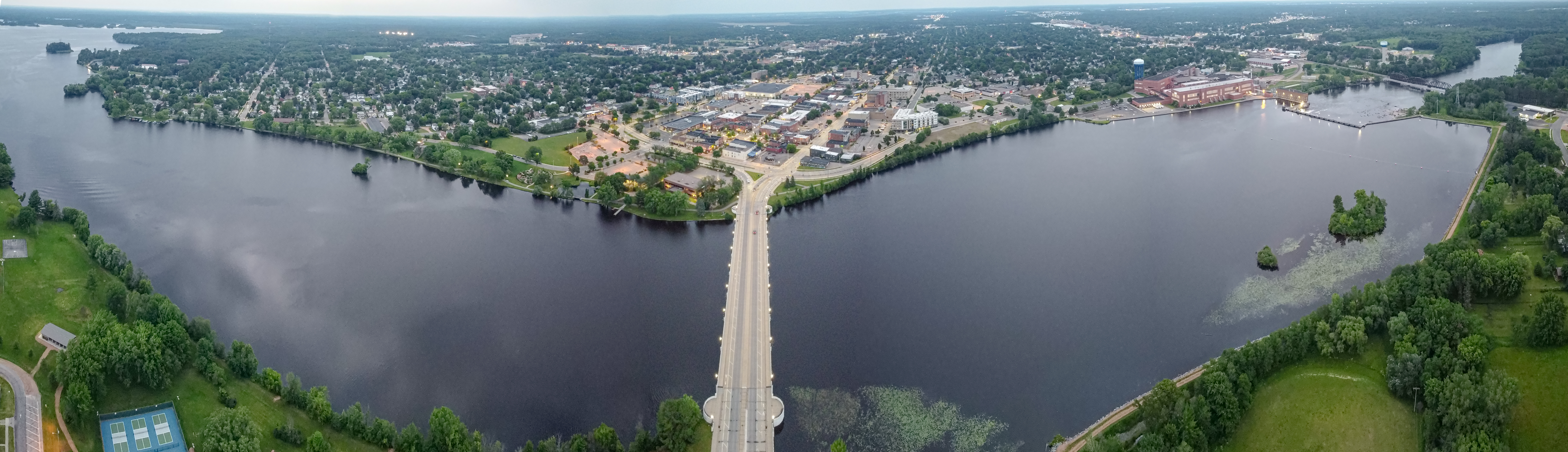

=== Climate ===
Climate data for Stevens Point, Wisconsin, 1991–2020 normals, extremes 1893–present
Month	Jan	Feb	Mar	Apr	May	Jun	Jul	Aug	Sep	Oct	Nov	Dec	Year
Record high °F (°C)	55 (13)	70 (21)	82 (28)	90 (32)	104 (40)	104 (40)	108 (42)	102 (39)	100 (38)	94 (34)	78 (26)	62 (17)	108 (42)
Mean maximum °F (°C)	42.5 (5.8)	48.2 (9.0)	63.0 (17.2)	76.3 (24.6)	84.3 (29.1)	88.5 (31.4)	89.8 (32.1)	88.3 (31.3)	84.8 (29.3)	76.9 (24.9)	61.2 (16.2)	47.3 (8.5)	92.0 (33.3)
Mean daily maximum °F (°C)	23.6 (−4.7)	28.1 (−2.2)	40.0 (4.4)	53.6 (12.0)	66.5 (19.2)	75.8 (24.3)	79.7 (26.5)	77.8 (25.4)	70.2 (21.2)	56.9 (13.8)	41.7 (5.4)	29.0 (−1.7)	53.6 (12.0)
Daily mean °F (°C)	15.3 (−9.3)	18.7 (−7.4)	30.4 (−0.9)	43.1 (6.2)	55.9 (13.3)	65.7 (18.7)	69.8 (21.0)	67.9 (19.9)	59.8 (15.4)	47.1 (8.4)	33.7 (0.9)	21.6 (−5.8)	44.1 (6.7)
Mean daily minimum °F (°C)	7.1 (−13.8)	9.3 (−12.6)	20.8 (−6.2)	32.7 (0.4)	45.2 (7.3)	55.6 (13.1)	59.8 (15.4)	57.9 (14.4)	49.5 (9.7)	37.3 (2.9)	25.6 (−3.6)	14.2 (−9.9)	34.6 (1.4)
Mean minimum °F (°C)	−14.7 (−25.9)	−11.1 (−23.9)	−0.4 (−18.0)	19.7 (−6.8)	30.9 (−0.6)	42.8 (6.0)	49.8 (9.9)	47.4 (8.6)	35.4 (1.9)	24.6 (−4.1)	9.8 (−12.3)	−7.0 (−21.7)	−18.3 (−27.9)
Record low °F (°C)	−37 (−38)	−48 (−44)	−31 (−35)	0 (−18)	14 (−10)	26 (−3)	38 (3)	31 (−1)	13 (−11)	6 (−14)	−13 (−25)	−32 (−36)	−48 (−44)
Average precipitation inches (mm)	1.21 (31)	1.11 (28)	1.80 (46)	3.37 (86)	4.08 (104)	5.00 (127)	3.82 (97)	3.79 (96)	3.62 (92)	2.73 (69)	1.90 (48)	1.54 (39)	33.97 (863)
Average snowfall inches (cm)	11.6 (29)	11.5 (29)	6.9 (18)	4.2 (11)	0.0 (0.0)	0.0 (0.0)	0.0 (0.0)	0.0 (0.0)	0.0 (0.0)	0.3 (0.76)	1.9 (4.8)	12.3 (31)	48.7 (123.56)
Average precipitation days (≥ 0.01 in)	9.6	8.4	9.2	11.5	12.2	12.2	11.0	10.0	10.9	10.8	8.8	10.0	124.6
Average snowy days (≥ 0.1 in)	9.0	7.1	4.3	2.0	0.0	0.0	0.0	0.0	0.0	0.4	3.1	7.9	33.8
Source 1: NOAA
Source 2: National Weather Service

== Demographics ==
Historical population
Census	Pop.	Note	%±
1860	1,538		—
1870	1,895		23.2%
1880	4,445		134.6%
1890	7,896		77.6%
1900	9,524		20.6%
1910	8,692		−8.7%
1920	11,371		30.8%
1930	13,623		19.8%
1940	15,777		15.8%
1950	16,564		5.0%
1960	17,837		7.7%
1970	23,479		31.6%
1980	22,970		−2.2%
1990	23,006		0.2%
2000	24,551		6.7%
2010	26,717		8.8%
2020	25,666		−3.9%

=== 2020 census ===
As of the 2020 census, Stevens Point had a population of 25,666. The population density was 1,495.1 inhabitants per square mile (577.3/km^{2}).

The median age was 30.0 years. 16.5% of residents were under the age of 18 and 14.7% of residents were 65 years of age or older. For every 100 females there were 98.5 males, and for every 100 females age 18 and over there were 97.3 males age 18 and over.

99.2% of residents lived in urban areas, while 0.8% lived in rural areas.

There were 10,771 households in Stevens Point, of which 21.1% had children under the age of 18 living in them. Of all households, 32.3% were married-couple households, 26.5% were households with a male householder and no spouse or partner present, and 31.3% were households with a female householder and no spouse or partner present. About 39.4% of all households were made up of individuals and 12.5% had someone living alone who was 65 years of age or older.

There were 11,386 housing units at an average density of 663.2 per square mile (256.1/km^{2}), of which 5.4% were vacant. The homeowner vacancy rate was 0.8% and the rental vacancy rate was 4.8%.

The 2020 census population of the city included 40 people incarcerated in adult correctional facilities and 2,595 people in student housing.

Racial composition as of the 2020 census
Race	Number	Percentage
White	21,970	85.6%
Black or African American	682	2.7%
American Indian and Alaska Native	158	0.6%
Asian	1,232	4.8%
Native Hawaiian and Other Pacific Islander	10	0.0%
Some other race	345	1.3%
Two or more races	1,269	4.9%
Hispanic or Latino (of any race)	1,047	4.1%

=== 2016–2020 ACS estimates ===
According to American Community Survey estimates for 2016-20, the median income for a household in the city was $46,663, and the median income for a family was $73,009. Male full-time workers had a median income of $48,618 versus $32,409 for female workers. The per capita income was $26,127. About 7.0% of families and 19.3% of the population were below the poverty line, including 11.4% of those under 18 and 8.6% of those 65 or older. Of the population 25 and older, 93.4% were high school graduates or higher and 38.1% had a bachelor's degree or higher.

=== 2010 census ===
As of the 2010 census, 26,717 people, 10,598 households, and 4,944 families reside in the city. The population density was 1,674.0 inhabitants per square mile (646.3/km^{2}). They occupied 11,220 housing units at an average density of 703.0 per square mile (271.4/km^{2}). The racial makeup of the city was 91.7% White, 0.9% African American, 0.4% Native American, 4.7% Asian, 0.7% from other races, and 1.5% from two or more races. Hispanic or Latino of any race was 2.6% of the population.

Among households, 21.7% had children under the age of 18, 34.9% were married couples living together, 8.5% had a female householder with no husband present, 3.2% had a male householder with no wife present, and 53.3% were non-families. Of all households, 34.9% were made up of individuals, and 11.2% had someone living alone who was 65 years of age or older. The average household size was 2.21 and the average family size was 2.87.

The median age in the city was 26.5 years. 16% of residents were under the age of 18; 31.3% were between the ages of 18 and 24; 22.3% were from 25 to 44; 18.5% were from 45 to 64; and 12% were 65 years of age or older. The gender makeup of the city was 48.8% male and 51.2% female.

=== Religion ===
The mother house of the Sisters of St. Joseph of the Third Order of St. Francis was in Stevens Point. Catholic parishes in the city include Holy Spirit, St. Stephen, St. Casimir, St. Peter, and St. Joseph. Lutheran and other Protestant churches are also present, along with members of the Baháʼí Faith.

A wide variety of Catholic and Protestant churches spread throughout Stevens Point. Many of those churches date back to the early 20th century. Within the past century, other religious groups have made their mark on Stevens Point.

== Economy ==
Major employers in the area include Pixelle Specialty Solutions paper mill, Associated Banc-Corp, Sentry Insurance, Travel Guard (travel and insurance), Donaldson Company, Skyward (software design), Lands' End, Canadian National Railway, Delta Dental of Wisconsin, Worzalla Publishing, Mason Companies (formerly known as Figis), Berkshire Hathaway Travel Protection, Herrschners, and the Stevens Point Brewery.

Companies with corporate headquarters in the city include Sentry Insurance, Ki Mobility, Delta Dental of Wisconsin, and Skyward. Associated Bank, Canadian National, AIG, and the Donaldson Company have regional headquarters in Stevens Point.

Business developments in the area include Crossroads Commons, Portage County Business Park, Venture Drive and Corporate Center, Stevens Point Industrial Park, Eastridge, Parkdale Plazas, Stevens Points East Side and Downtown Stevens Point.

The downtown CenterPoint MarketPlace shopping mall closed in 2012; the mall's enclosed interior was demolished later that year as part of the property's redevelopment.

At one time, Midstate Airlines had its headquarters in Stevens Point.

== Arts and culture ==
Stevens Point is home to a community theater group, Central Wisconsin Area Community Theatre (cwACT); a children's museum; and a group of museums run by the Portage County Historical Society, including the Beth Israel Congregation Museum, in the former synagogue. (The synagogue has been defunct since 1985.)

Religion plays a significant role in the community. In 1847, the first recorded religious service was held near the town square with a pastor from Norway. As time went by, more religions joined the town square; by 1900, Catholic, Lutheran, and Methodist churches and Jewish synagogues were established within one mile of the downtown area.

The Central Wisconsin Symphony Orchestra (CWSO) presents four concerts each season.

Most events happen near the downtown area, many at the town square, which was rebuilt in 2011. These include the annual Riverfront Rendezvous, Corn on the Curb, sculpture park summer celebration, Fourth of July parade, Krazy Days and Gather at the River.

The downtown area was designated a "Wisconsin Main Street Community" and offers specialty shops and restaurants. Buildings in downtown Stevens Point are made from materials including Lake Superior limestone, brick, and red granite. City and county administrative offices are downtown, as are a bank regional headquarters and two insurance companies. Downtown also offers night life on "the Square" that is popular with college students and a farmers' market that has been selling fresh produce for over 100 years. The farmers' market is open early summer through early fall.

Stevens Point hosts the world's largest trivia contest, run by UWSP's radio station, WWSP-FM. The contest, which typically involves over 12,000 contestants on more than 400 teams, is held every year in April and lasts 54 consecutive hours, from Friday to Sunday.

The city was the setting for the first three seasons of the Disney Channel series Liv and Maddie.

The progressive bluegrass band Horseshoes and Hand Grenades was formed in Stevens Point.

== Parks and recreation ==
The area hosts 20 developed parks and a 26-mile (42 km) bicycle and jogging trail (the Green Circle Trail) that surrounds and winds through the city. The Ice Age National Scenic Trail also runs through the city. An 18-hole Robert Trent Jones Jr.–designed public golf course, SentryWorld, is at the Sentry Insurance Home Office. The Schmeeckle Reserve, a nature reserve, is on the University of Wisconsin–Stevens Point campus. Right outside of Schmeeckle is the Stevens Point Sculpture Park, which displays sculpture by local artists.

The area also has Goerke Park, which includes a football stadium where high school and college athletes compete. An outdoor track is used by the same groups.

The Backwaters Paddle Quest canoe adventure challenge has been held in Stevens Point on the Wisconsin River since 2002, usually during the second week of August. Players paddle their crafts over two days past checkpoints along the river, encountering characters who act out a storyline that continues year to year.

Iverson Park is a recreational park course that lies on the green circle trail and Plover River in Stevens Point. It spans over 100 acres, and contains a swimming area, hiking trails, and canoe and recreation activities rental.

== Education ==
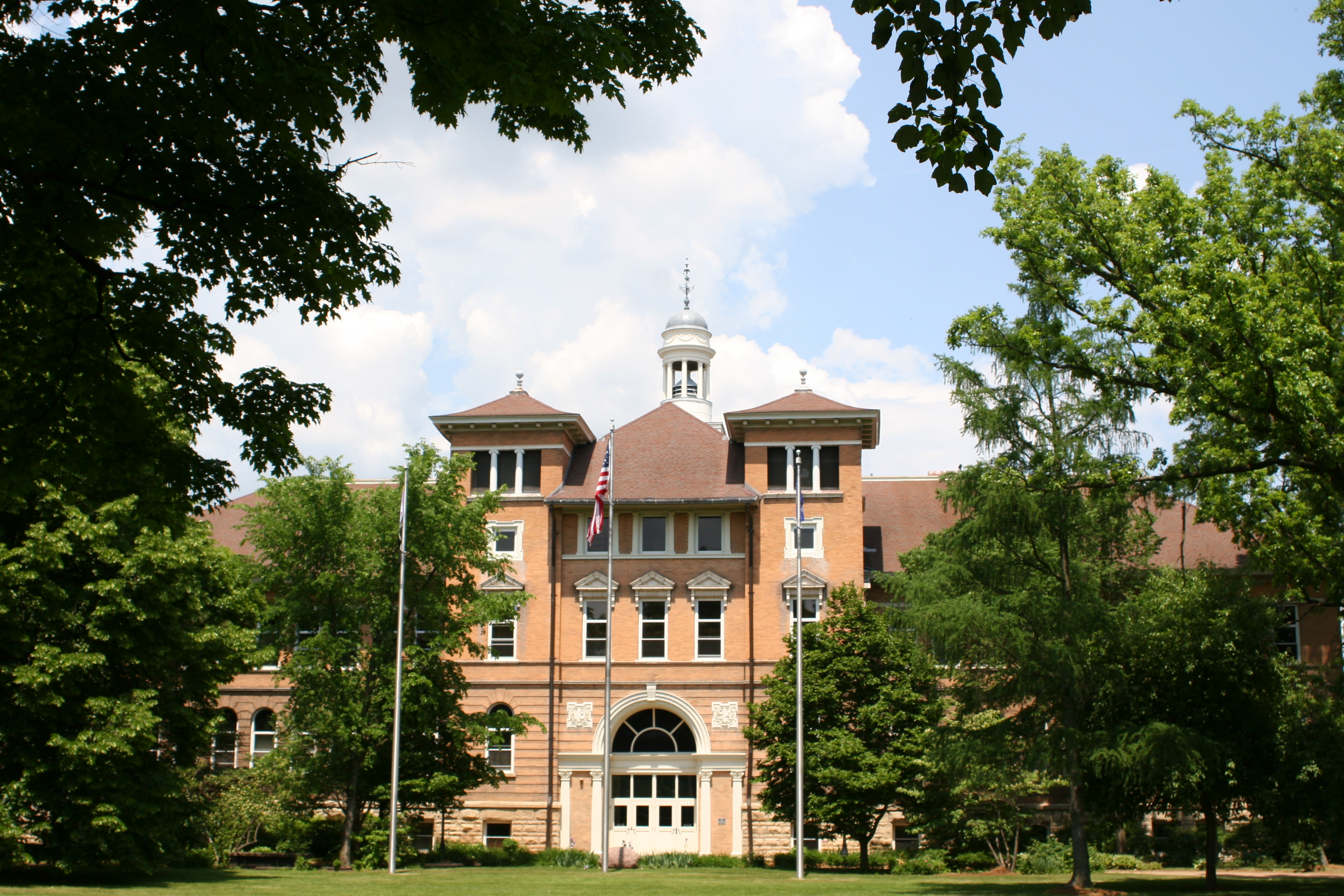
Old Main, University of Wisconsin–Stevens Point

The Stevens Point Area Public School District serves the city, as do the Pacelli Catholic Schools and Point of Discovery School.

Public elementary schools (K–6) include Bannach, Jefferson School for the Arts, Kennedy, Madison, McDill, McKinley, Roosevelt, Plover-Whiting, and Washington Service-Learning Center. There are two junior high schools (7–9), Ben Franklin and P. J. Jacobs, and two high schools, Stevens Point Area Senior High (SPASH) (10–12) and Charles F. Fernandez Center for Alternative Learning.

Parochial schools include St. Paul Lutheran School (Pre-K–8), St. Joseph Early Childhood Center, St. Bronislava (K–4) St. St. Stephen Elementary School (K–4) Pacelli Catholic Middle School (5–8), and Pacelli High School (9–12).

The city serves as the hub of the Portage County Public Library, which provides educational resources and programming for adults, young adults, and children.

Stevens Point is home to the University of Wisconsin–Stevens Point (UWSP). The university enrolls approximately 7,313 undergraduate and 651 graduate students. Mid-State Technical College (MSTC) is also in the city.

== Transportation ==
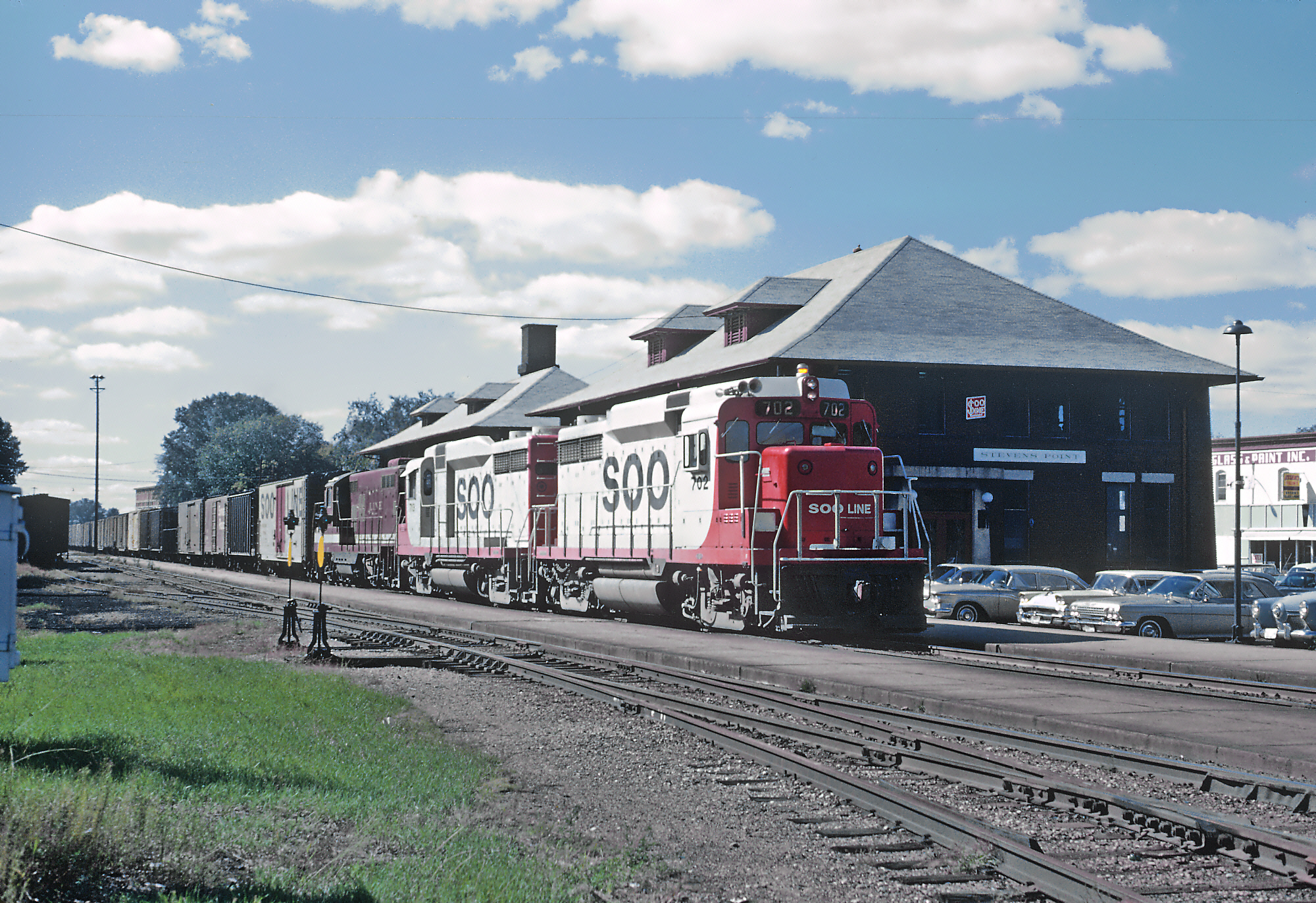
A Soo Line Railroad train passing through Stevens Point in 1964

=== Major highways ===
Five major roads pass through Stevens Point:

- I-39 Northbound I-39 routes to Wausau. Southbound, it routes to Madison and Bloomington.
- US 10 travels east to Manitowoc and Bay City and west to Fargo.
- US 51 Northbound US 51 routes to Hurley. Southbound, US 51 routes to Baton Rouge, Louisiana.
- WIS 54 travels east to Green Bay and west to Onalaska.
- WIS 66 travels east to Rosholt and west to Wisconsin Rapids.

=== Airports ===
The city is served by two airports. Commercial service is available through Central Wisconsin Airport (KCWA), located midway between Stevens Point and Wausau, in Mosinee. CWA is served by two major airlines. General aviation, charter flights and air cargo operators use the local Stevens Point Municipal Airport (KSTE).

=== Public transit ===
Stevens Point Transit system provides public transportation. Lamers Bus Lines and Van Galder Bus Company provide intercity bus service.

== Notable people ==
- Donn Behnke, distance runner, author, and cross country coach
- Aimee Betro, convicted of attempting to carry out a contract killing in the UK
- Cole Caufield, NHL player
- Pat Friday, baseball executive for the Kansas City Athletics
- Suzy Favor Hamilton, middle distance runner, NCAA champion, 3-time Olympian
- Sam Hauser, NBA player
- Joel Hodgson, writer, comedian, and actor; creator of Mystery Science Theater 3000
- Ian Holland, first class cricketer for Victoria cricket team, and Hampshire County Cricket Club
- Kathy Kinney, actress and comedian
- Ben Kissel, former co-host of The Last Podcast on the Left
- Ross Kolodziej, NFL player and coach
- Floyd Lounsbury, linguist and anthropologist
- Janel McCarville, WNBA player and coach
- Harry McCurdy, Major League Baseball catcher
- James Miller, Catholic teacher and missionary
- Ben Provisor, Olympic wrestler
- Peggy Rajski, Oscar-winning filmmaker, and activist
- Ryan Ramczyk, NFL player
- Rick Reichardt, former MLB player
- Patrick Rothfuss, author
- Chris Solinsky, NCAA champion distance runner
- Garrett Weber-Gale (born 1985), Olympic swimmer
- Peter Weller, actor, director, and art historian
- Chet Yorton, professional bodybuilder

== Sister cities ==
- Gulcz, Greater Poland Voivodeship, Poland
- Rostov Veliky, Yaroslavl Oblast, Russia

== See also ==
- Linwood Springs Research Station
