= Chris Solinsky =

American distance runner (born 1984)

- Solinsky winning the 5000 meters at the 2006 NCAA Championships

Personal information
- Nationality: American
- Born: December 5, 1984 (age 41) Stevens Point, Wisconsin, U.S.
- Height: 6 ft 1 in (1.85 m)
- Children: 2

Sport
- Country: United States
- Sport: Athletics/Track, Long-distance running
- Events: 5000 meters, 10,000 meters
- College team: Wisconsin Badgers
- Club: Bowerman Track Club
- Turned pro: 2007
- Coached by: Jerry Schumacher
- Retired: 2016
- Now coaching: University of Wisconsin (Director)

Achievements and titles
- World finals: 2009 Berlin; 5000 m, 12th
- Personal bests: 1500 m: 3:35.89; Mile: 3:54.52(i); 3000 m: 7:34.32; 2-mile: 8:15.77; 5000 m: 12:55.53; 10,000 m: 26:59.60
Medal record
Men’s athletics
NCAA Track and Field Championships
| Gold medal – first place | 2006 Sacramento | 5,000m |
| Gold medal – first place | 2007 Sacramento | 5,000m |

Chris Solinsky (born December 5, 1984) is an American retired distance runner and an American college cross country coach. Solinsky is the current director of cross country and track and field at the University of Wisconsin. Among his more notable achievements, he won eight state championships in high school and five NCAA Division I championships at Wisconsin. He was the American 10,000 meters record holder with a time of 26:59.60 as well as the first non-African to break the 27-minute barrier in the 10,000 m. Five other Americans have since joined him in breaking the 27-minute barrier.

== Running career ==
=== High school ===
Solinsky was born in Junction City, Wisconsin, and attended high school at Stevens Point Area Senior High (SPASH). Led by legendary coach Donn Behnke, Solinsky dominated the competition after his freshman year, winning the state cross country title three times. He won 11 state medals, eight state titles, led the nation in time on six occasions, and earned four 1st Team All-American awards. He broke Wisconsin high school state records in the indoor 1600 m, the indoor 2-mile, and the outdoor 3200 m. He also broke state meet records in cross country and the outdoor 3200 m. He is the 2nd athlete in Wisconsin state history to ever win 3 straight 3200 meter championships (Ben Porter is the first). As a Junior Chris finished second to Bobby Lockhart from Virginia in both the Nike Indoor Championships 2 Mile and the Adidas Outdoor Classic 2 Mile Championships. His winning time of 14:41 at the 2002 Foot Locker National Cross Country Championships gave him a 21-second winning margin, the largest margin of victory in the history of the meet. He finished his high school career with personal records of 4:03.80 (1600 m) and 8:43.24 (3200 m).

=== Collegiate ===
Solinsky chose the University of Wisconsin–Madison after graduating from high school in the spring of 2003. There, training under coach Jerry Schumacher, he continued to improve as a national-class runner. The Badgers were undefeated in Big Ten championships during Solinsky's career, sweeping the 2003-2007 cross country, indoor track and field, and outdoor track and field titles. Wisconsin also won two NCAA team titles during those years (2005 cross country, 2007 indoor track and field), and finished as national runner-up three times (cross country 2003, 2004, 2006). As an individual, Solinsky earned four Big Ten individual titles, 14 All American accolades, and five individual national titles (2005 and 2006 indoor 3000 m, 2007 indoor 5000 m, 2006 and 2007 outdoor 5000 m). He also formerly held the Wisconsin school record in the indoor 3000 m and currently holds the record in the outdoor mile.

At the Badger Twilight Meet on May 6, 2006 (52 years to the day after Roger Bannister broke the barrier for the first time), Solinsky and four other athletes ran a 1-mile race at the Dan McClimon Track. Former Badger Matt Tegenkamp finished first in 3:56.58 and Solinsky finished second in 3:57.80, both becoming the first to dip under four minutes on Wisconsin soil.

Solinsky graduated from Wisconsin in December 2007 with Bachelor of Arts degrees in history and sociology.

=== Professional running ===
After graduating from the University of Wisconsin, Solinsky signed contracts with Nike and KIMbia Athletics. He continued to live and train in Madison, Wisconsin, until January 2009, at which point he moved to Portland, Oregon, and became part of the Bowerman Track club (along with his coach, Jerry Schumacher, and teammates including Matt Tegenkamp).

In 2008, Solinsky failed to qualify for the 2008 Summer Olympics in the 5,000 meters. In 2009, Solinsky qualified for the 2009 World Championships in Berlin with a second-place finish at the U.S. Championship. At the 2009 World Championships in Athletics in Berlin, Solinsky finished in 12th place with a time of 13:25.87.

Solinsky achieved several of his greatest professional successes during the spring and summer of 2010. On May 1, 2010, Solinsky ran his first 10,000 meter race at the Payton Jordan Invitational. Although the race was marketed as an American record attempt by fellow American Galen Rupp, Solinsky finished first and set the American Record of 26:59.60 (bettering Meb Keflezighi's 2001 mark of 27:13.98 by fourteen seconds). Solinsky was the first non-African to break the 27-minute barrier for the 10,000 meters. At 6'1" and 165-pounds, Solinsky was also the first man over 6 feet or over 141 pounds to break the 27-minute barrier.

Several weeks later, on June 4, 2010, Solinsky improved his personal best in the 5,000 meters, breaking the 13 minute barrier by running 12:56.66 at the Bislett Games. Two months later, on August 6, 2010, Solinsky further improved his personal best with a 12:55.53 performance in the DN Galan event in Stockholm, the second-fastest time ever recorded by a non-African-born runner.

Beginning in 2011, Solinsky suffered a series of injuries. He developed a chronic left hamstring strain, which became an avulsion after Solinsky tripped over his dog. The injury required surgery, making it impossible for him to compete in the 2012 US Olympic Trials. In 2015, Solinsky suffered from an injury to his Achilles tendon, which led to a calf problem and a limp, and interfered with his ability to train for the 2016 US Olympic Trials.

Solinsky chose to retire from professional running in April 2016.

== Coaching ==
Solinsky served as a volunteer coach at the University of Portland from 2012 to 2014. During that time the men's team placed 12th at the NCAA Championships in 2012 and improved to seventh in 2013.

On August 8, 2014, College of William and Mary Director of Track and Field and Cross Country Stephen Walsh announced that Solinsky would be hired as an assistant coach, working primarily with the distance and middle-distance athletes. In September 2016, Solinsky was promoted to the position of Head Distance Coach.

On July 13, 2017, University of Florida track and field Head Coach Mike Holloway announced that Solinsky would join the Florida Gators track and field and cross country programs as an assistant coach.

In December 2022, it was announced that Solinsky would leave his position with the Gators to become an assistant coach at the University of Oregon.

As one of the most decorated athletes in Wisconsin history with five NCAA championships, four Big Ten titles, and 14 All‑American honors, he became executive director of the Wisconsin Badgers W Club on January 8, 2026. The school announced in September 2026 that he would be succeeded in that role by Darryl Sims.

In June 2026, Solinsky was named the director of cross country and track and field at the University of Wisconsin.

== Personal ==
Solinsky is married to Amy Dahlin, who competed in the pole vault at Wisconsin. Together they have a daughter, Ayla, a son, Archer, and dog, Tucker.

== Personal bests ==
| Distance | Performance | Date |
|---|---|---|
| 1500 m | 3:35.89 | April 15, 2011 |
| Mile | 3:54.1 | September 20, 2008 |
| 3000 m | 7:34.32 | August 29, 2010 |
| 5000 m | 12:55.53 | August 6, 2010 |
| 10,000 m | 26:59.60 | May 1, 2010 |

== Achievements ==
- 2006 Big Ten Indoor Track Athlete Of The Year
- 2006 Big Ten Outdoor Track Athlete Of The Year
- 2007 Big Ten Indoor Track Athlete Of The Year
- 2007 USTFCCCA National Indoor Track Athlete Of The Year
