= Metro Ride =

Mass transit system in Wausau, Wisconsin

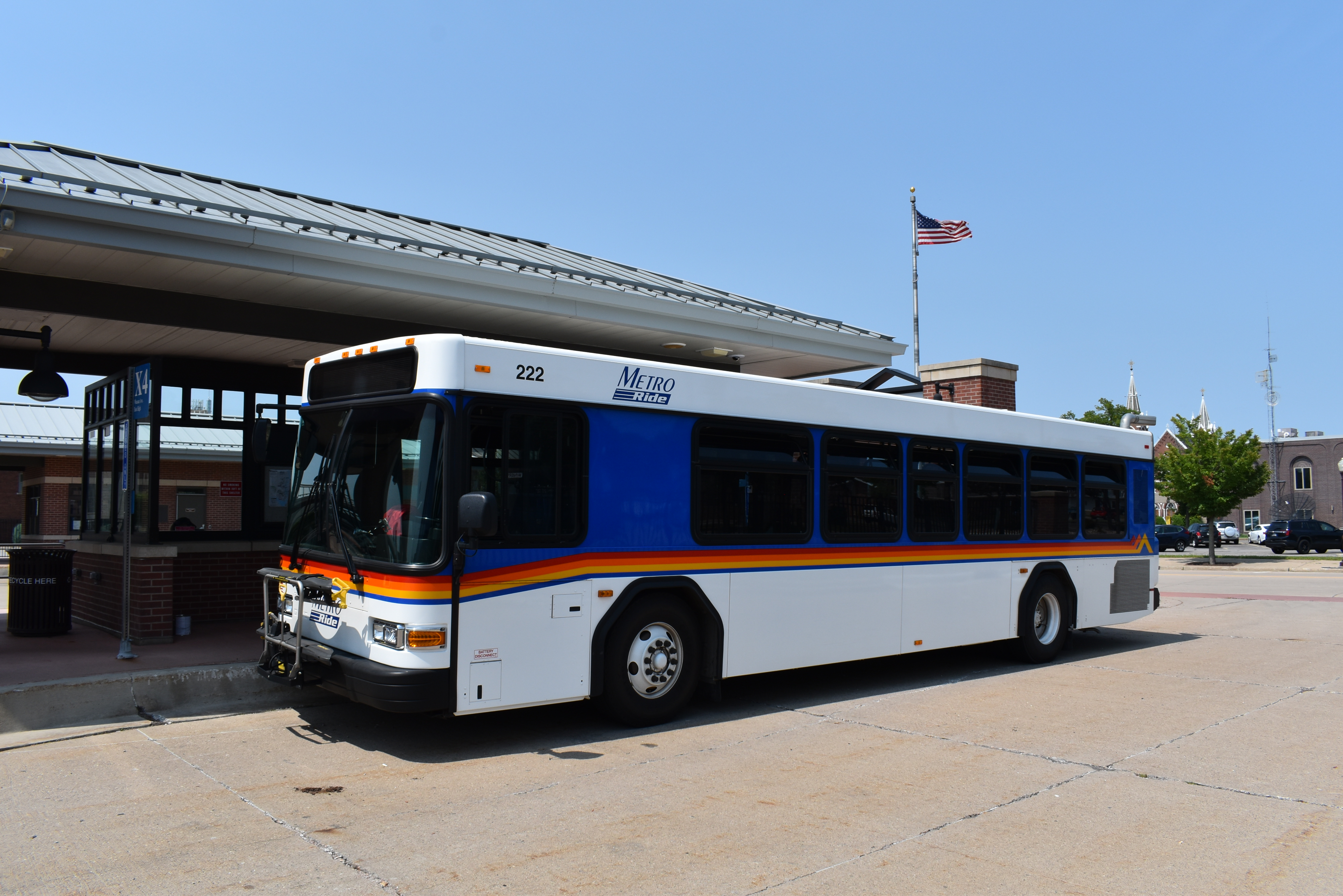
- Parent: City of Wausau
- Headquarters: 420 Plumer Street
- Locale: Wausau, Wisconsin
- Service area: Marathon County
- Service type: Bus service, Paratransit
- Routes: 17
- Hubs: Wausau Transit Center
- Fleet: 22 Gillig transit coaches
- Annual ridership: 337,884 (2022)
- Website: Official site

Metro Ride, formerly Wausau Area Transit System (WATS), provides public bus transportation in the Wausau, Wisconsin area.

Metro Ride operates 7 routes in the City of Wausau, which run at 30-minute intervals. The service also provides several express routes to supplement the main routes when school is in session.

Hours of operation are 6:30 a.m. to 6:30 p.m. on weekdays, with no services on weekends. The main transfer facility is located in the downtown area and also serves intercity buses.

== Routes ==
All routes operate from the transit center.

- A - Grand Ave/Health Center
- B - North 1st Ave/Northcentral Technical College
- D - Bridge St/West High School
- G - Sherman St
- H - North 6th St/Riverview
- I - Stewart Ave/Aspirus Hospital
- J - Thomas St

Service to Rothschild, Schofield and Weston ended in 2015, along with weekend service. At the same time, fares were raised.

== Wausau Transit Center ==
The Wausau Transit Center is located at in downtown Wausau, across from the Marathon County Courthouse. The facility replaced a 1976 transit center located on an adjacent lot to the west of the current center. The new facility was built in 2005 and has space for about ten buses.

== Ridership ==
Year	Fixed Route Ridership	Paratransit Ridership	Total Ridership	Change over previous year
2013	672,224	3,388	675,612	▲6.47%
2014	654,078	3,303	657,381	▼2.7%
2015	577,044	2,504	579,548	▼11.84%
2016	529,831	3,021	532,852	▼8.06%
2017	498,902	4,152	503,054	▼5.59%
2018	503,359	3,841	507,200	▲0.89%
2019	468,555	4,120	472,675	▼6.81%
2020	252,812	1,683	254,495	▼46.16%
2021	284,378	3,050	287,428	▲12.94%
2022	337,884	3,273	341,157	▲18.69%
2023	359,363	2,937	362,300	▲6.2%

== Fixed Route Service Trends ==
2012-2016 data from 2018 Wausau Transit Development Plan. 2017-2020 data from National Transit database.

Year	Service Hours	Service Miles
2012	26,729	375,988
2013	29,372	411,843
2014	29,854	404,710
2015	27,028	375,626
2016	26,722	376,478
2017	27,324	377,052
2018	26,502	376,034
2019	26,407	376,816
2020	23,621	343,693
2021	27,017	381,209
2022	27,150	375,959

== See also ==
- Stevens Point Transit
- List of bus transit systems in the United States
