= Travel Guard =

North American travel insurance provider

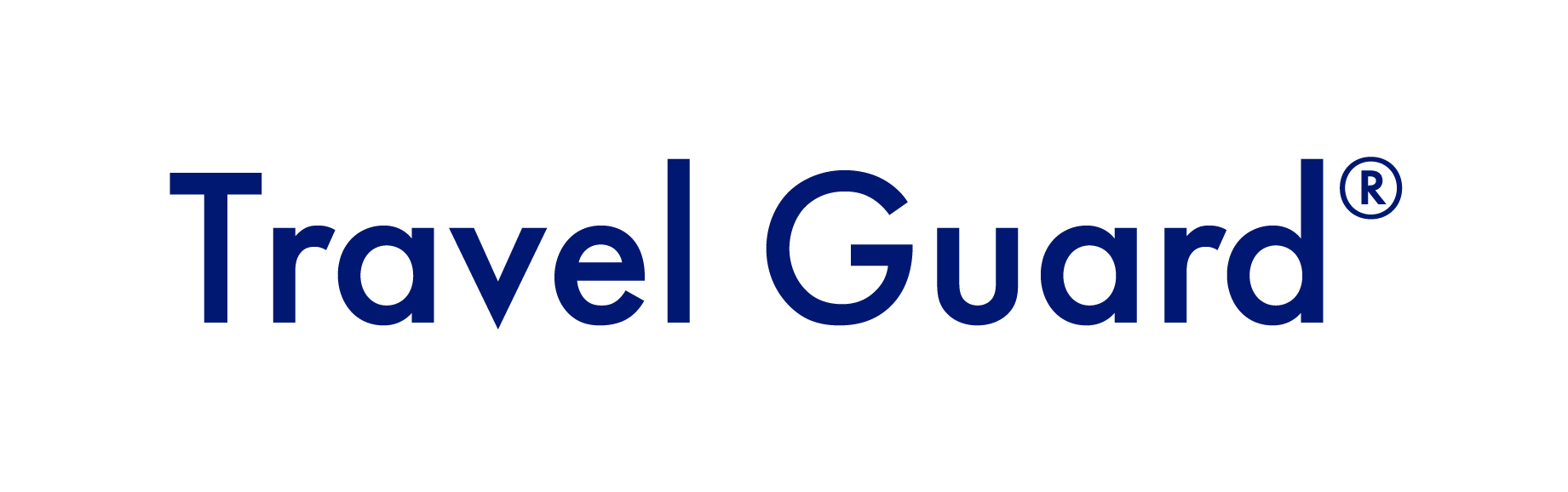
- Industry: Travel insurance
- Founded: 1982; 44 years ago
- Founder: John M. Noel
- Number of locations: Eight global service centers
- Area served: 80+ countries around the world
- Key people: Jeff Rutledge, CEO (2006) Robert Gallagher, COO and Head of U.S. and Canada
- Owner: Independent; (1982–91, 1993-2006); AIG; (2006-2024); Zurich Insurance Group; (2024–present)
- Website: www.travelguard.com

Travel Guard is the product name for travel insurance and assistance services provided by Zurich Insurance Group.

== History ==
In 1982 John M. Noel developed the Travel Guard product while he was working at Sentry Insurance. Soon, John purchased the rights to Travel Guard, and by 1985, Travel Guard was operating out of the basement of its founder’s home.

In 1987, it acquired Marathon Travel Shops. In 1993, two years after selling it to GMF, its founder reacquires Travel Guard from the French firm.

In 2000, Noel, David LaFayette, and Nathan LaFayette created Travel Guard-Canada to offer travel insurance and travel services to Canadians. In May 2006, New York-based AIG acquired Travel Guard.

In July 2009, the company moved to its new home in a business park located off I-39 in Stevens Point. AIG subsidiary, National Union Fire Insurance Company, underwrites Travel Guard policies. In 2012, it became the product range name for all travel-related products and services of AIG.

On December 2, 2024, Zurich Insurance Group completed the purchase of Travel Guard.

== Operating territory ==
AIG Travel has Travel Guard service centers in Stevens Point, WI; Houston, Texas; Brighton, United Kingdom; Kuala Lumpur, Malaysia, Okinawa, Japan; Mexico City, Mexico; Sofia, Bulgaria; and Guangzhou, China.

== See also ==
- Heymondo
- World Nomads
