= South Central Library System =

Library system in Wisconsin, US

Coordinates: 43.145744°N 89.294258°W

Map of Wisconsin highlighting South Central Library System counties

The South Central Library System (SCLS) is a consortium of 53 public libraries in 7 Wisconsin counties: Adams, Columbia, Dane, Green, Portage, Sauk, and Wood.

The mission of the South Central Library System is " to help its member libraries provide the best possible service to the public."

== Members ==
SCLS serves libraries in these communities, as well as the Dane County Library Service:

- Adams County
- Albany
- Amherst
- Arpin
- Baraboo - Carnegie-Schadde Memorial Public Library
- Belleville
- Black Earth
- Brodhead
- Cambria
- Cambridge
- Columbus
- Cross Plains
- Deerfield
- DeForest - DeForest Area Public Library
- Fitchburg
- LaValle
- Lodi
- Madison (Central Library & 8 branches)
- Marshall
- Marshfield
- Mazomanie
- McFarland
- Middleton
- Monona
- Monroe
- Monticello
- Mount Horeb
- Nekoosa
- New Glarus
- North Freedom
- Oregon
- Pardeeville
- Pittsville
- Plain
- Portage
- Poynette
- Prairie du Sac
- Reedsburg
- Rio
- Rock Springs
- Rome
- Sauk City
- Spring Green
- Stevens Point-Portage County (Central Library & 3 branches)
- Stoughton
- Sun Prairie
- Verona
- Vesper
- Waunakee
- Wisconsin Dells
- Wisconsin Rapids
- Wyocena
