= Park Ridge, Wisconsin =

- Village
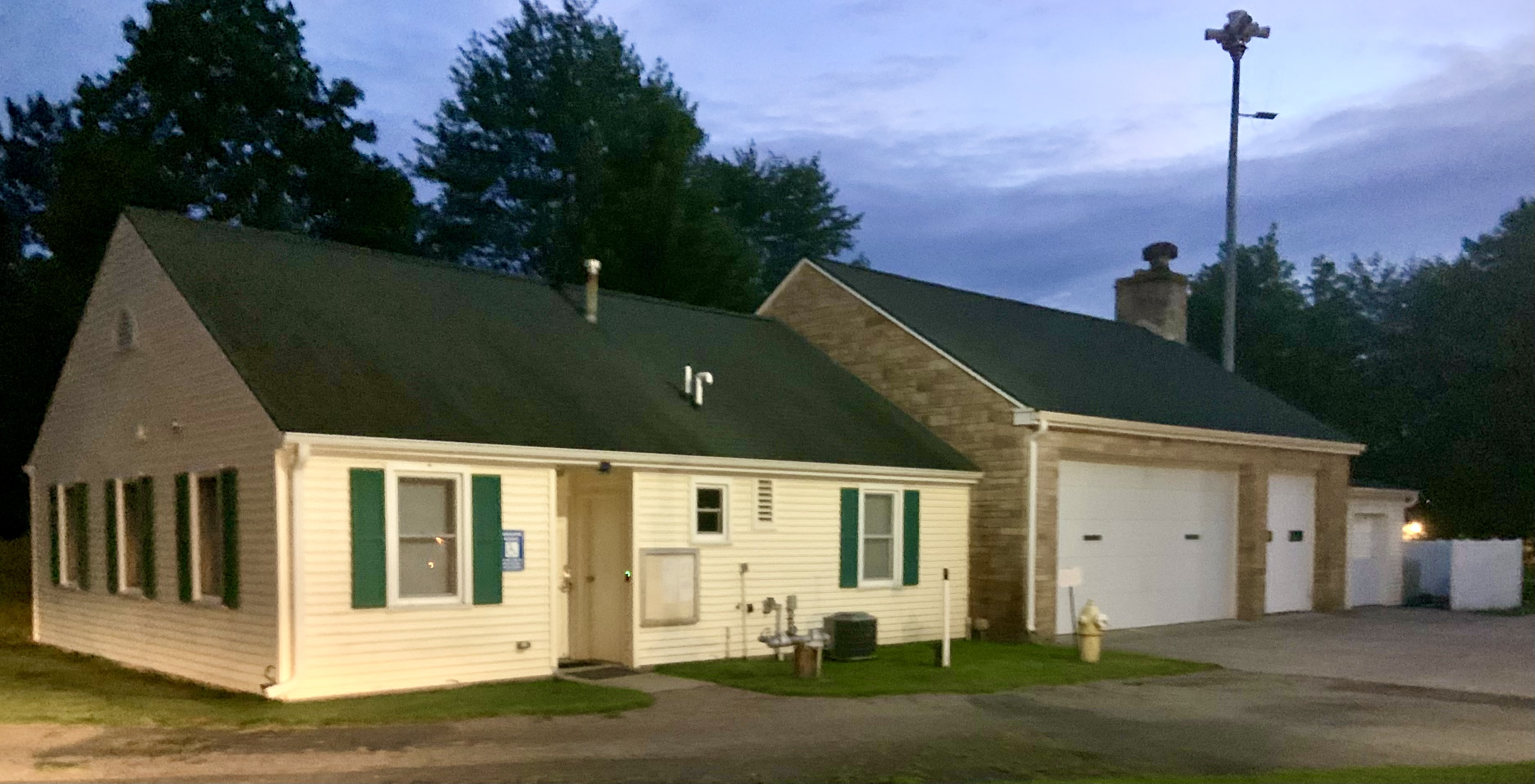
- Village hall

- Location of Park Ridge in Portage County, Wisconsin.
- Coordinates: 44°31′12″N 89°32′47″W
- Country: United States
- State: Wisconsin
- County: Portage

Area
  - Total: 0.23 sq mi (0.59 km^{2})
  - Land: 0.23 sq mi (0.59 km^{2})
  - Water: 0 sq mi (0.00 km^{2})
- Elevation: 1,096 ft (334 m)

Population (2020)
  - Total: 530
  - Density: 2,175.9/sq mi (840.13/km^{2})
- Time zone: UTC-6 (Central (CST))
  - Summer (DST): UTC-5 (CDT)
- Zip code: 54481
- Area codes: 715 & 534
- FIPS code: 55-61325
- GNIS feature ID: 1571045
- Website: https://vi.parkridge.wi.gov/

Park Ridge is a village in Portage County, Wisconsin, United States and is a suburb of Stevens Point. It is included in the Stevens Point Micropolitan Statistical Area. The population was 530 at the 2020 census.

== Geography ==
Park Ridge is located at 44°31′12″N 89°32′47″W (44.519996, -89.546338).

According to the United States Census Bureau, the village has a total area of 0.22 square miles (0.57 km^{2}), all land.

== Demographics ==
Historical population
Census	Pop.	Note	%±
1940	210		—
1950	314		49.5%
1960	504		60.5%
1970	817		62.1%
1980	643		−21.3%
1990	546		−15.1%
2000	488		−10.6%
2010	491		0.6%
2020	530		7.9%
U.S. Decennial Census

=== 2010 census ===
As of the census of 2010, there were 491 people, 217 households, and 137 families living in the village. The population density was 2,231.8 inhabitants per square mile (861.7/km^{2}). There were 228 housing units at an average density of 1,036.4 per square mile (400.2/km^{2}). The racial makeup of the village was 91.4% White, 2.2% African American, 0.2% Native American, 4.9% Asian, and 1.2% from two or more races. Hispanic or Latino of any race were 0.4% of the population.

There were 217 households, of which 23.5% had children under the age of 18 living with them, 55.3% were married couples living together, 5.1% had a female householder with no husband present, 2.8% had a male householder with no wife present, and 36.9% were non-families. 34.1% of all households were made up of individuals, and 22.6% had someone living alone who was 65 years of age or older. The average household size was 2.26 and the average family size was 2.92.

The median age in the village was 50.6 years. 23.4% of residents were under the age of 18; 3.3% were between the ages of 18 and 24; 16.2% were from 25 to 44; 29.8% were from 45 to 64; and 27.3% were 65 years of age or older. The gender makeup of the village was 46.4% male and 53.6% female.

=== 2000 census ===
As of the census of 2000, there were 488 people, 211 households, and 147 families living in the village. The population density was 2,243.8 people per square mile (856.4/km^{2}). There were 216 housing units at an average density of 993.2 per square mile (379.1/km^{2}). The racial makeup of the village was 97.75% White, 0.20% African American, 1.84% Asian, and 0.20% from two or more races. Hispanic or Latino of any race were 0.82% of the population.

There were 211 households, out of which 23.7% had children under the age of 18 living with them, 63.0% were married couples living together, 5.7% had a female householder with no husband present, and 29.9% were non-families. 27.5% of all households were made up of individuals, and 13.3% had someone living alone who was 65 years of age or older. The average household size was 2.31 and the average family size was 2.83.

In the village, the population was spread out, with 20.5% under the age of 18, 3.9% from 18 to 24, 21.7% from 25 to 44, 29.5% from 45 to 64, and 24.4% who were 65 years of age or older. The median age was 48 years. For every 100 females, there were 99.2 males. For every 100 females age 18 and over, there were 93.0 males.

The median income for a household in the village was $57,031, and the median income for a family was $70,962. Males had a median income of $46,250 versus $28,500 for females. The per capita income for the village was $28,074. None of the families and 0.8% of the population were living below the poverty line, including no under eighteens and none of those over 64.

== Transportation ==
Central Transportation provides public transit service to Park Ridge via Route 4.

== Notable people ==
- Anton C. Krembs, politician and businessman, lived in Park Ridge.
