= Plover River =

River in the United States of America

Plover River Big Plover River
- Native name: Au-puh-ki-ra-kan-e-we Se-be (Chippewa)

Location
- Country: United States
- State: Wisconsin
- Counties: Portage County, Wisconsin, Marathon County, Wisconsin, Langlade County, Wisconsin

Physical characteristics
- Mouth
  - coordinates: 44°29′2.89″N 89°34′0.43″W
  - elevation: 1,056 feet (322 m)

The Plover River is a river in the U.S. state of Wisconsin.

It is a tributary of the Wisconsin River as the Plover River originates near Aniwa in extreme southern Langlade County and flows through Marathon County, then into Portage County.

The Plover River flows through Hatley and Stevens Point before it converges into the Wisconsin River in Whiting just above Plover.
