= WTSJ-LD =

Television station in Milwaukee

- Milwaukee, Wisconsin; United States
- Channels: Digital: 26 (UHF); Virtual: 38

Programming
- Affiliations: see § Subchannels

Ownership
- Owner: Innovate Corp.; (HC2 Broadcasting, Inc.)
- Sister stations: WZCK-LD (Madison–Middleton)

History
- First air date: December 12, 2006
- Former call signs: W55CG (1995–2001); W53CC (2001–2006); WBWT-LP (2006–2015); WTSJ-LP (2015–2020)
- Former channel numbers: Analog: 55 (UHF, 2001–2007), 38 (UHF, 2007–2015); Digital: 38 (UHF, 2015–2019)
- Former affiliations: Azteca América (2005–2012, 2016–2022); MundoFox/MundoMax (2012–2016); Timeless TV (2023); Visión Latina (2023–2024); Speed Sport 1 (2024–2025); Fubo Sports Network (2025–2026)
- Call sign meaning: The station's former print media partner before the sale to HC2 was the Milwaukee edition of The Spanish Journal

Technical information
- Licensing authority: FCC
- Facility ID: 56213
- Class: LD
- ERP: 10 kW
- HAAT: 191.2 m (627 ft)
- Transmitter coordinates: 43°05′46.2″N 87°54′15″W

Links
- Public license information: LMS

WTSJ-LD (channel 38) is a low-power television station in Milwaukee, Wisconsin, United States, owned by Innovate Corp. The station's transmitter is located at the Milwaukee PBS tower on North Humboldt Boulevard in Milwaukee's Estabrook Park neighborhood.

== History ==
=== Early license establishment ===
WTSJ-LD has its origins in a construction permit for a low-power television station on channel 55 in Ludington, Michigan, which the Federal Communications Commission (FCC) granted to Richard L. Bourassa on May 31, 1995 and issued the call sign W55CG. Bourassa sold the station to MS Communications on November 16, 2000. A month later, MS filed for a license to cover the permit, which was granted on February 16, 2001; on May 24, the company obtained a construction permit to move the station to channel 53 in Milwaukee as W53CC. The channel 53 permit was subsequently replaced with one for operation on channel 38 (as W38DT) on April 14, 2004. MS Communications had plans to establish wireless cable networks, but never broadcast anything other than test patterns on its stations.

=== Bustos era with Azteca ===
Bustos Media purchased the station from MS Communications for $1,350,000 on June 9, 2006. MS had shut down the W55CG facility in Ludington on the previous day in preparation for the completion of the sale. Bustos changed the call letters to WBWT-LP on August 30, 2006, built the channel 38 facility in Milwaukee, began airing a test pattern in September 2006, and officially signed WBWT-LP on the air on December 12. The station originally served as an affiliate of Azteca América and also initially carried a video simulcast of the morning program from sister radio station WDDW (104.7 FM). It expected to add additional local programming to serve Milwaukee's Hispanic community. Time Warner Cable began carrying the station throughout its service area in October 2009 on digital cable channel 807.

Bustos filed for a construction permit with the FCC to build digital transmitter facilities on UHF channel 31 in 2010. In September of that year, Bustos transferred most of its licenses to Adelante Media Group as part of a settlement with its lenders.

=== Switch to MundoFox ===
On July 25, 2012, Adalante announced that it had signed an affiliation agreement to switch its Azteca America affiliates to upstart Spanish-language network MundoFox, which officially launched on August 13. However, WBWT-LP switched to the network two weeks earlier on August 1 during its unadvertised soft launch period. Azteca's national feed was eventually picked up by Time Warner and Charter.

Adalante sold WBWT-LP, along with KBTU-LP in Salt Lake City, to DTV America Corporation for $425,000 on July 16, 2015. On October 20, DTV America changed the station's call letters to WTSJ-LP; the calls stand for the initials of their print media partner The Spanish Journal, Milwaukee's leading Hispanic-American publication.

=== DTV America era; going digital, return to Azteca, and additional networks ===
Around the time of the sale to DTV America, the station launched their digital signal on channel 38 via a flash cut. In addition to MundoMax on 38.1, WTSJ-LP resumed their affiliation with Azteca on 38.2, with both signals transmitting in 720p. With the move of WTSJ-LP to digital operations, it was the last station in the Milwaukee market to end analog operations. Slowly, DTV America began to establish their common template of having multiple subchannel networks on one signal seen in other markets.

In December 2015, Azteca was replaced with Buzzr and the feed was converted to 480p.

On May 5, 2016, the station launched a third subchannel for the Katz Broadcasting network Escape (the current day Court TV Mystery), which eventually transitioned to Katz sister station WTMJ-TV (channel 4).

In late October 2016, WTSJ-LP again resumed carrying Azteca on their main channel, its third affiliation round with the network, as the moribund MundoMax network began to wind down operations. In addition, a fifth subchannel carrying The Country Network was added. This returned that network to Milwaukee after a year-long absence, since WCGV-TV had dropped it from their second subchannel for Comet along with the AccuWeather Channel on a seventh subchannel (using the national feed without local conditions). Eventually the sixth subchannel was filled by Tuff TV, and all three subchannels were remapped.

With WTMJ ending their carriage of Cozi TV at the start of 2017, WTSJ-LP dropped Escape in the month before as WTMJ picked it up in its place. WTSJ-LP3 was left vacant with a paid programming loop until January 15, 2017, when WTSJ-LP completed the exchange and added Cozi TV for several months until July 27, when that network became exclusive to WIWN (channel 68).

With HC2 Holdings' mid-2017 acquisition of DTV America and the November 2017 acquisition of Azteca, the station became an owned and operated station, though its new ownership began to wind down most local operations and promotions. With the repeal of the Main Studio Rule in 2019, the station's studio and office on South 108th Street in West Allis was closed, and it is now centralcased out of what is now Innovate's programming hub with no local presence.

On October 25, 2019, WTSJ-LP went temporarily silent as an after effect of the operators and engineers of the Milwaukee PBS tower adjusting the tower's various antennas before and after the market's October 18, 2019, FCC-required frequency shifts involving the spectrum auction. WTSJ-LP also shifted to a post-repack channel of channel 26 and when it did, took an "LD" channel suffix.

Azteca America discontinued operations on December 31, 2022, with Innovate replacing it with Timeless TV, a network run by Burlington-based Canella Media. By the next month, Spanish programming had returned to the station's main channel, and it carried the Visión Latina network until the start of 2025, whens witched to the Fubo Sports Network.

== Subchannels ==
The station's digital channel is multiplexed:

Subchannels of WTSJ-LD
Subchannel	Res.	Short name	Programming
38.1	480i	WTSJ-LD	QVC 365
38.2	480i	WTSJ-LD	Buzzr
38.3	480i	WTSJ-LD	Black Vision TV (4:3)
38.4	480i	WTSJ-LD	Shop LC
38.5	480i	WTSJ-LD	NBC True CRMZ
38.6	480i	WTSJ-LD	TeleXitos
38.7	480i	WTSJ-LD	Jewelry TV
38.8	480i	WTSJ-LD	365BLK
38.9	480i	WTSJ-LD	Defy
38.10	480i	WTSJ-LD	NTD America
38.11	480i	WTSJ-LD	Hasbro Legends
38.12	480i	WTSJ-LD	Infomercials (4:3)
38.13	480i	WTSJ-LD	Newsmax2
