= Berkshire Hathaway Travel Protection =

American based travel insurance company

- Industry: Travel Insurance
- Founder: John M. Noel
- Headquarters: Stevens Point, WI, USA
- Key people: president:
- Products: Leisure travel and E&O insurance
- Services: travel insurance plans: vacation cancellations flight delays missed connections medical emergencies while traveling and lost or delayed baggage

Berkshire Hathaway Travel Protection (BHTP) is a North American-based travel insurance company, headquartered in Stevens Point, Wisconsin.

Business lines include traditional travel insurance offerings for leisure travelers, a travel-agent errors-and-omissions insurance group, travel insurance underwriting for Managing General Agents (MGAs) and claims administration services.

BHTP’s former president and founder, John M. Noel, was also the founder of Travel Guard|Travel Guard International and the former chairman and CEO of the Noel Group. Current president is Dean Sivley.

== History ==
On Jan. 27, 2014, it was announced that Berkshire Hathaway Specialty Insurance had signed an agreement with Noel Group to purchase the assets of MyAssist and Insure America. BHTP was founded in May 2014. It concentrates on travel insurance services and relies heavily on technology to pay claims through real-time trip-tracking and electronic deposits.

== Products ==
BHTP’s product suite includes varying levels of their ExactCare plans, as well as niche travel insurance products for leisure travelers. BHTP's travel insurance plans are similar to other traditional travel insurance plans available in the U.S., but most of their plans also include additional fixed pay-out benefits designed to keep travelers continuing on their journey when common travel hassles occur.

In June 2020, Berkshire Hathaway Travel Protection (BHTP) has confirmed the introduction of ExactCare Lite, a premium robust travel policy tailored for travelers on the route. ExactCare Lite can cover non-refundable hotel bookings and attraction passes, travel damage caused by road collisions and can support families with rates available for children.

== Product reception ==
USA Today called BHTP “an innovative new company … aiming to cover snafus not covered elsewhere, with minimal effort on the part of the insured .” Travel + Leisure said AirCare is “simple, inexpensive travel insurance that covers what’s never been covered before ,” while Condé Nast Traveler said AirCare means that “put-upon fliers can get relief without having to depend on an airline to deliver it. ”

Criticism on FlyerTalk has focused on reports of poor claims service and claims denied due to flight cancellations.

Other travel insurance products include WaveCare for leisure cruise travelers and AdrenalineCare, a niche travel insurance plan designed for travelers who engage in more extreme activities while on vacation.
