= Donn Behnke =

American distance runner, coach, and author (born 1954)

Personal information
- Occupations: Coach; author; distance runner

Donn Behnke is an American former distance runner, author, and cross country coach. He currently serves as the head coach for the Stevens Point Area Senior High School boy's cross country team. During his time as a coach, he has led Stevens Point to 23 State Championship and runner-up titles. He also competed for the University of Wisconsin–Stevens Point men's cross country and track and field teams from 1972 to 1976 and authored The Animal Keepers.

== Running career ==
During his high school running career, Behnke competed for John Marshall High School in Milwaukee, Wisconsin. Here he earned a team state championship win in 1970 and graduated in 1971.

Behnke competed for the University of Wisconsin–Stevens Point men's cross country and track and field teams from 1972 to 1976.

== Coaching ==
Behnke Began coaching in 1976 as the assistant coach for the Stevens Point Area Senior High School boys cross country team where he would later become the head coach. In 1977, he led them to their first state champion title.

From 1999 to 2001, he coached Chris Solinsky to three individual state champion titles and one national champion title.

From 2021 to 2025, his team became the first since 1945 to earn four consecutive team state champion titles.

In 2019, 2022, and 2023, his team qualified for NXN. In 2024, Ethan Olds qualified as an individual.

Behnke currently coaches alongside Kevin Hopp and Harrison Smith.

== Writing ==
Behnke's book, The Animal Keepers, was published on August 25, 2015. His book is centered on the SPASH boys 1985 cross country team.

== Personal life ==
Behnke is the brother of NCAA Division III All-American Glenn Behnke.

Donn Behnke married Cheryl Przybelski in 1984.
