= McMillan Memorial Library, Wisconsin =

Coordinates: 44.38793°N 89.82138°W

McMillan Memorial Library
- Location: 490 East Grand Avenue; Wisconsin Rapids, Wisconsin, United States
- Type: Public
- Established: 1970
- Branch of: South Central Library System

Other information
- Website: www.mcmillanlibrary.org

The McMillan Memorial Library is the municipal library of Wisconsin Rapids, Wisconsin and serves southern Wood County. It is a member of the South Central Library System, which serves seven counties in Wisconsin.

== History ==
The library's history began with a bequest made by Thomas Blythe Scott, who in 1886 left five-thousand dollars to the city of Grand Rapids "for the purpose of procuring, establishing, and maintaining a library, forever free, for the use of the inhabitants thereof." By the terms of his will, the city was to "provide and furnish a suitable and convenient room or building", but it took the city three years to pass the needed referendum. On March 22, 1890 the T. B. Scott Free Public Library of Grand Rapids opened in rented rooms on what would become Second Street. In 1892, the library moved to four rooms in the newly constructed City Hall. When Grand Rapids and neighboring Centralia merged in 1900 and established a new city hall across the river, the library gradually expanded into the former city offices. In 1920, the city was renamed Wisconsin Rapids.

In 1896, Mr. Jeremiah (Jere) D. Witter learned of a traveling library in Dunn County, Wisconsin and instantly gave the T. B. Scott Library one-thousand dollars to create such a system for neighboring villages and towns in south Wood County. At his request, the Board of Trustees organized itself into a second Board to operate this project, which the trustees insisted should be called the J. D. Witter Free Traveling Libraries. This valuable service, the second to be established in Wisconsin, was offered throughout the area for 51 years.

In 1947, Mr. George Mead (President of Consolidated Water Power and Paper Company) bought the Witter home on Third Street and gave it to the city for the use of the library. While a great improvement, this facility eventually proved too small for the growing community. By the mid-1960s, the need for a larger library was apparent.

In September, 1964, Mrs. Mary McMillan Burt established the McMillan Trust with a gift of Consolidated Papers stock valued at half a million dollars. Mrs. Burt had also requested that the new building include a theater to be used by some future theater group. With additional community donations and a federal grant, construction began in 1968 and the McMillan Memorial Library opened on May 17, 1970.

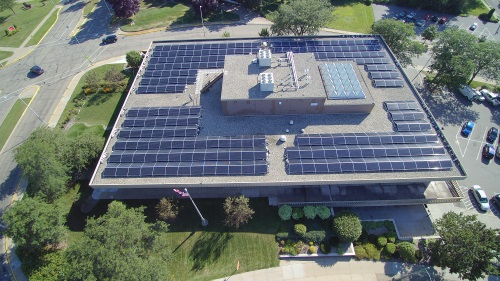
235 kW solar array, McMillan Memorial Library

Commons on Lower Level

The building has undergone significant remodeling, while retaining its original character. In 2006, a Commons area was created from storage space on the lower level. In 2010, a new main entrance was created on the west side. In 2013, the Youth Services area was remodeled and now includes an environmental learning station. In 2017, a 235 kW rooftop solar array was installed. In 2022, a two million dollar redesign created a 1,500 square foot makerspace, complete with a recording studio. In 2024 the rooftop solar array was removed due to high maintenance costs.

== Current services ==
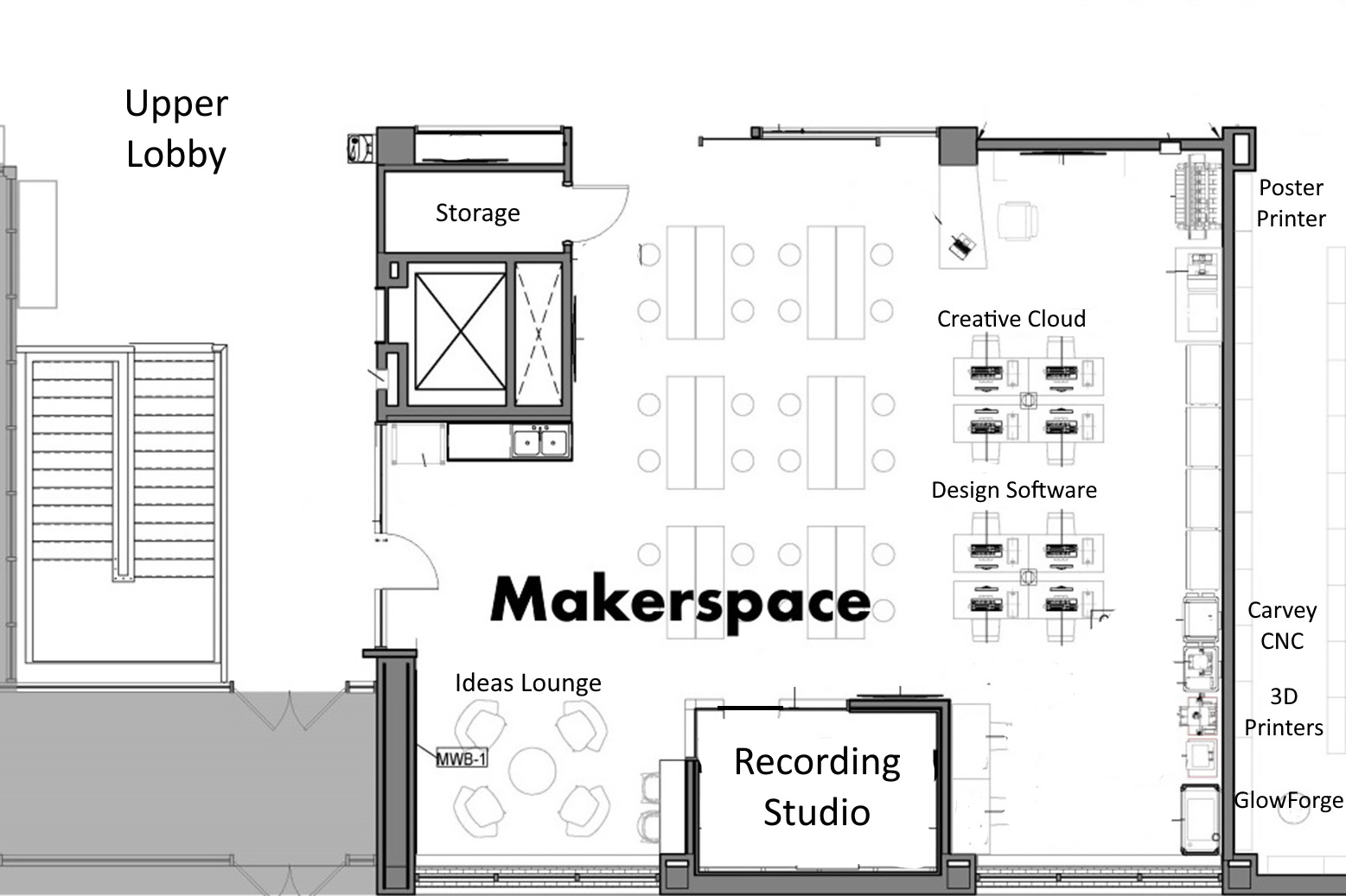
Makerspace at McMillan Memorial Library

In addition to its collection, the library offers many other services to patrons. There are two meeting rooms, a 249-seat theater used for movies and performances, a 'Commons', which is designed to function as a third place, a coffee house, a recently renovated children's library with hand-on activities, environmental learning station, and story area, free wireless Internet throughout the building, and a wide variety of programming for adults and children.

McMillan Memorial Library has won two Wisconsin Library Association/Highsmith Awards for innovation, one for its Coffeehouse series of authors and poets and the other for its on-line collection of local historical documents. Best Things Wisconsin named McMillan the third best library in the state, trailing only the Wisconsin Historical Society Library and Milwaukee Public Library. McMillan was a Finalist for the 2019 National Medal for Museum and Library Service.
