= Central Transportation (Stevens Point) =

Public transit provider in Stevens Point, Wisconsin

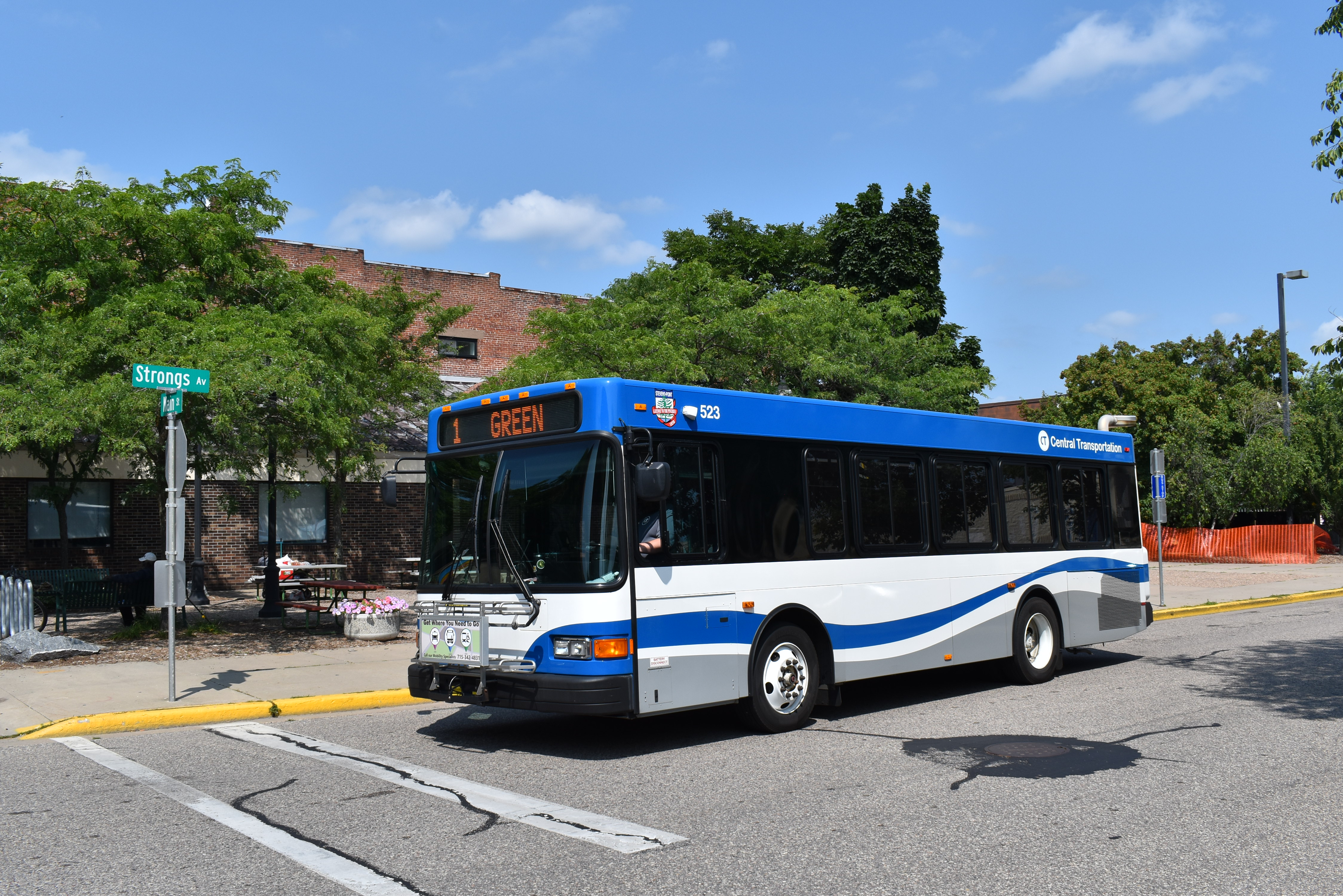
- Parent: City of Stevens Point
- Headquarters: 2700 Week St
- Locale: Stevens Point, Wisconsin
- Service area: Portage County
- Service type: bus service, paratransit
- Routes: 7
- Hubs: Stevens Point Transfer Center
- Fleet: 12
- Annual ridership: 146,313 (2024)
- Superintendent: Talin Scheuermann
- Website: StevensPoint.com/Transit

Central Transportation is the public transportation system in Stevens Point, Wisconsin. It is owned and operated by the City of Stevens Point and provides transit services throughout Portage County, Wisconsin. The system also operates additional routes in partnership with the University of Wisconsin–Stevens Point.

== Services ==
Central Transportation operates five regular bus routes that serve the city and the surrounding Villages of Whiting, Park Ridge, and the Crossroads Commons area in Plover. These routes operate on weekdays with no evening or weekend services. Two additional routes serve the University of Wisconsin–Stevens Point (UWSP) campus. The system also provides a late‑night service, under the Late Night Transit name, on Fridays and Saturdays when the university is in full session. This fare-free service is funded through various student fees and is open to the general public.

=== Regular and UWSP Routes ===
No.	Name
1	Green
2	Blue
3	Red
4	Yellow
5	Purple (UWSP)
7	LNT (Late Night Transit)
8	Orange

=== Paratransit ===
Branded as Point Plus, the service provides demand-responsive, door-to-door service for eligible riders in Stevens Point, Whiting, and Park Ridge.

=== Portage County services ===
Central Transportation also operates several community services in outlying areas of Portage County, including taxi services, Meals on Wheels, and a volunteer driver program for seniors and qualified residents.

== Ridership ==
Year	Ridership	Change over previous year
2014	274,796	n/a
2015	260,159	▼5.33%
2016	256,323	▼1.47%
2017	210,954	▼17.7%
2018	238,472	▲13.04%
2019	232,014	▼2.71%
2020	187,208	▼19.31%
2021	100,833	▼46.14%
2022	129,214	▲28.15%
2023	135,046	▲4.51%
2024	146,313	▲8.35%

== See also ==
- List of bus transit systems in the United States
- Metro Ride
