= Chambers Creek (Tennessee River tributary) =

Stream in Tennessee, U.S.

Coordinates: 35.061442°N 88.271713°W

Chambers Creek is a stream in the U.S. states of Mississippi and Tennessee. It is a tributary to the Tennessee River.

Chambers Creek has the name of John Chambers, a pioneer who settled in the area in 1820.
