= Heymondo =

Spanish company

- Company type: Limited liability company
- Industry: Financial services
- Founded: 2017
- Founder: Ricard Domenech and David Pérez
- Headquarters: Barcelona, Spain
- Area served: Europe and North America
- Number of employees: 100
- Website: heymondo.com

Heymondo (initially known as Mondo in Spain) is an online travel insurance brokerage based in Barcelona, Spain. Founded in 2017 by Ricard Domenech and David Pérez, the company offers travel-related insurance products, including medical assistance, cancellation, among other travel coverage.

Its headquarters are located in the 22@ district of Barcelona. It has over 100 employees.

== History ==
The company's co-founders and co-CEOs, Ricard Domenech and David Pérez, previously worked at Zurich Insurance Group. In 2017, they created Mondo, a digital platform specializing in travel insurance. Mondo had a travel assistance app that allows users to access medical care and manage incidents during their trips.

In November 2018, the company closed its third investment round, bringing in the international fund Howzat Partners, Banc Sabadell (through BStartup 10), Bankinter, and Cartera de Inversiones CM.

The company began its international expansion in 2019, first operating in Italy and later internationally.

In 2022, Heymondo surpassed pre-pandemic levels with revenues of five million euros. One year later, it expanded its presence to France, the US, and Portugal. On March 5, 2024, the company announced its official name change in Spain to Heymondo.

== Operations ==
Heymondo focuses its activity on the sale of online travel insurance. It is especially geared towards leisure travel.

Besides Spain, the company operates in Italy, France, Portugal, Romania, and the United States.
