= Whiting, Wisconsin =

- Village
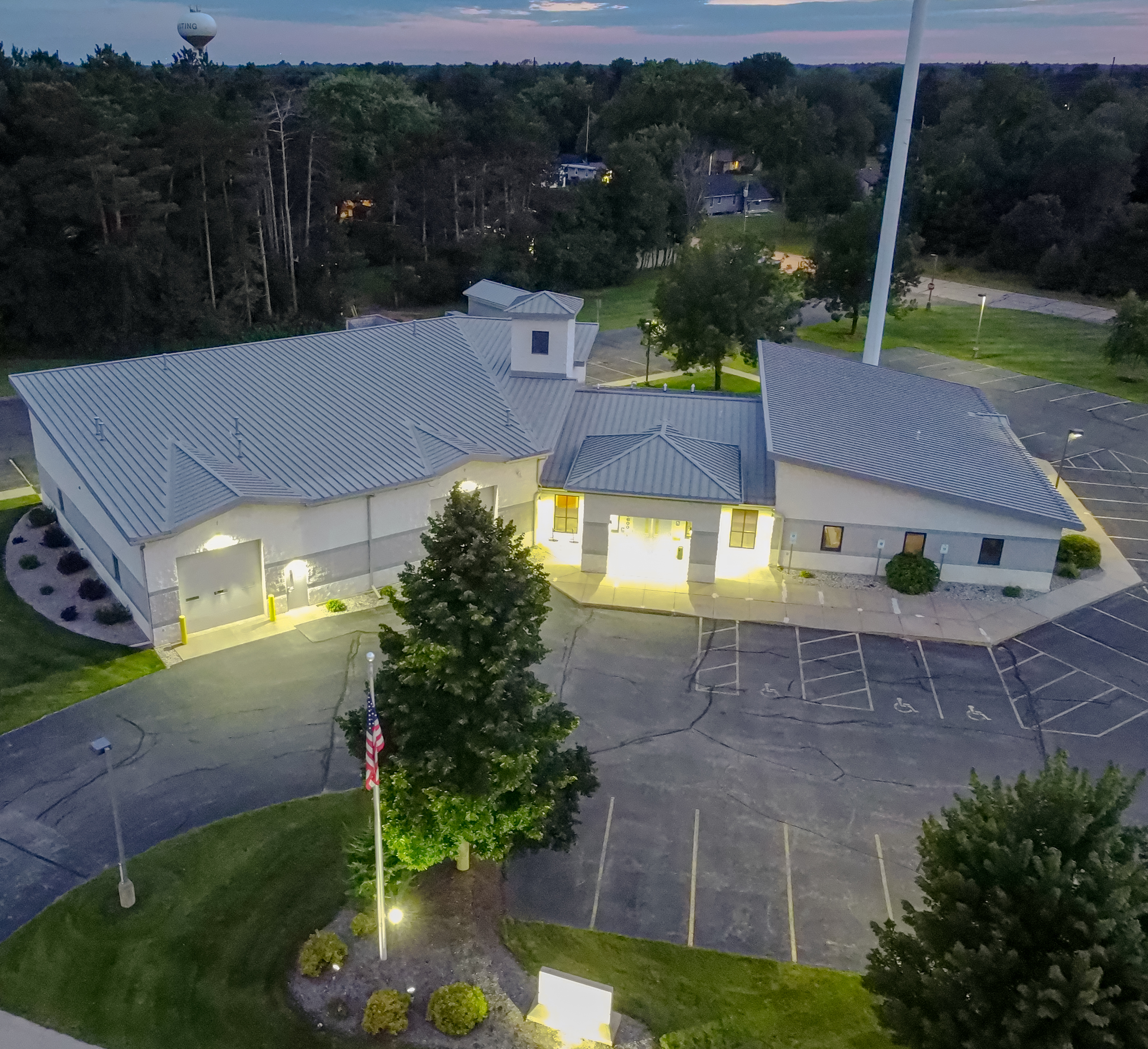
- Village hall

- Location of Whiting in Portage County, Wisconsin.
- Coordinates: 44°29′20″N 89°33′43″W
- Country: United States
- State: Wisconsin
- County: Portage
- Settled: 1893
- Incorporated: November 13, 1947
- Named for: George Albert Whiting

Government
  - Village President: Dean Curtis

Area
  - Total: 2.19 sq mi (5.66 km^{2})
  - Land: 1.81 sq mi (4.69 km^{2})
  - Water: 0.37 sq mi (0.97 km^{2})
- Elevation: 1,086 ft (331 m)

Population (2020)
  - Total: 1,601
  - Density: 942.1/sq mi (363.74/km^{2})
- Time zone: UTC-6 (Central (CST))
  - Summer (DST): UTC-5 (CDT)
- Zip code: 54481
- Area codes: 715 & 534
- FIPS code: 55-86975
- GNIS feature ID: 1576695
- Website: villageofwhiting.org

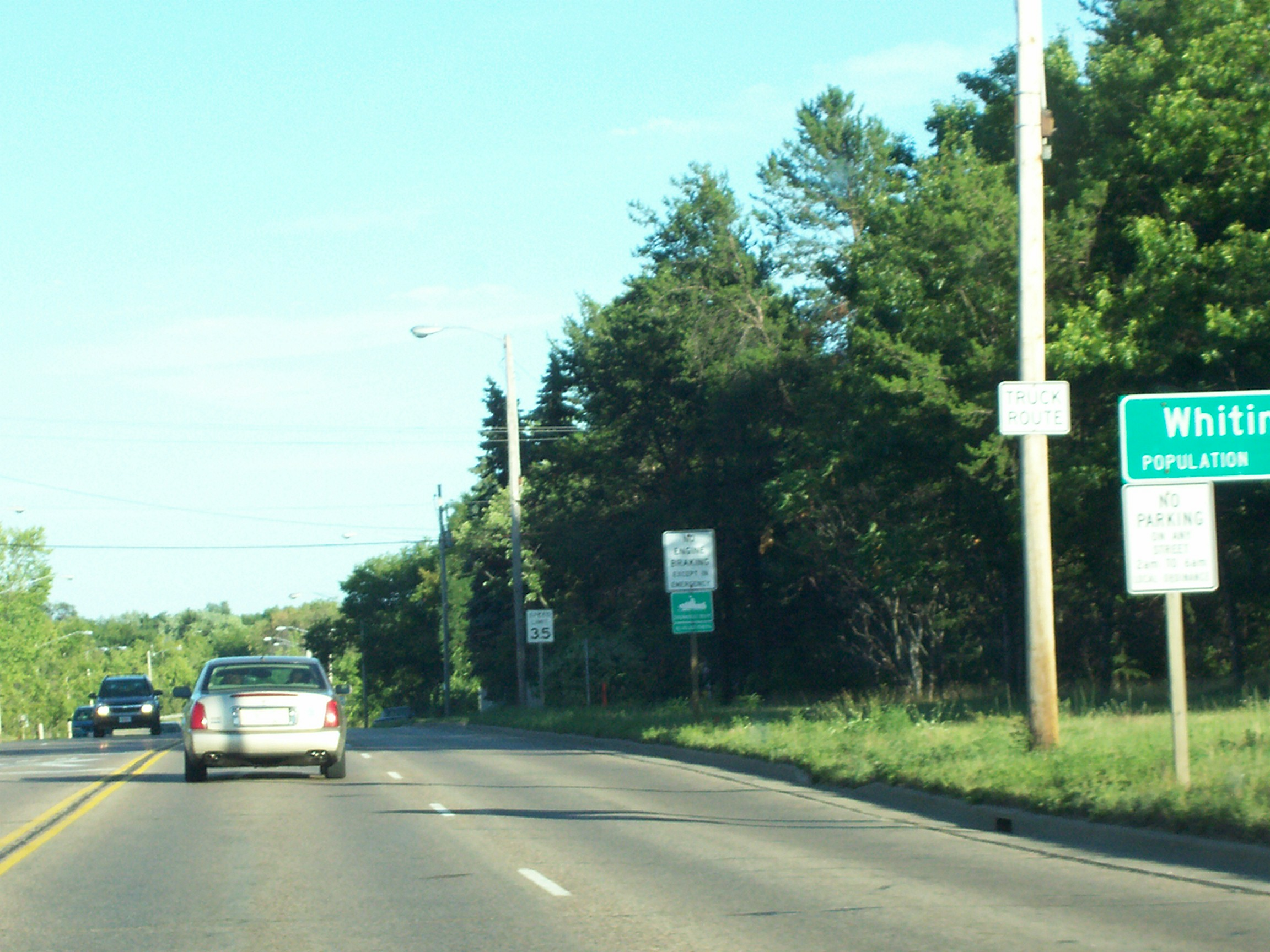
Sign for Whiting

Whiting is a village in Portage County, Wisconsin, United States and is a suburb of Stevens Point. It is included in the Stevens Point Micropolitan Statistical Area. The population was 1,601 at the 2020 census.

== Geography ==
Whiting is located at 44°29′20″N 89°33′43″W (44.488991, -89.562026).

According to the United States Census Bureau, the village has a total area of 2.16 square miles (5.59 km^{2}), of which 1.78 square miles (4.61 km^{2}) is land and 0.38 square miles (0.98 km^{2}) is water.

== Demographics ==
Historical population
Census	Pop.	Note	%±
1950	854		—
1960	1,193		39.7%
1970	1,782		49.4%
1980	2,050		15.0%
1990	1,838		−10.3%
2000	1,760		−4.2%
2010	1,724		−2.0%
2020	1,601		−7.1%
U.S. Decennial Census

=== 2010 census ===
As of the census of 2010, there were 1,724 people, 750 households, and 436 families living in the village. The population density was 968.5 inhabitants per square mile (373.9/km^{2}). There were 811 housing units at an average density of 455.6 per square mile (175.9/km^{2}). The racial makeup of the village was 95.5% White, 0.2% African American, 0.1% Native American, 2.0% Asian, 1.3% from other races, and 0.8% from two or more races. Hispanic or Latino of any race were 2.6% of the population.

There were 750 households, of which 20.3% had children under the age of 18 living with them, 48.7% were married couples living together, 6.7% had a female householder with no husband present, 2.8% had a male householder with no wife present, and 41.9% were non-families. 36.1% of all households were made up of individuals, and 19.5% had someone living alone who was 65 years of age or older. The average household size was 2.13 and the average family size was 2.77.

The median age in the village was 50.5 years. 15.7% of residents were under the age of 18; 6.3% were between the ages of 18 and 24; 21.6% were from 25 to 44; 26% were from 45 to 64; and 30.5% were 65 years of age or older. The gender makeup of the village was 47.7% male and 52.3% female.

=== 2000 census ===
As of the census of 2000, there were 1,760 people, 690 households, and 445 families living in the village. The population density was 945.7 people per square mile (365.3/km^{2}). There were 702 housing units at an average density of 377.2 per square mile (145.7/km^{2}). The racial makeup of the village was 95.40% White, 0.45% African American, 0.23% Native American, 2.84% Asian, 0.11% from other races, and 0.97% from two or more races. Hispanic or Latino of any race were 1.14% of the population.

There were 690 households, out of which 24.6% had children under the age of 18 living with them, 56.2% were married couples living together, 5.9% had a female householder with no husband present, and 35.5% were non-families. 30.1% of all households were made up of individuals, and 18.6% had someone living alone who was 65 years of age or older. The average household size was 2.31 and the average family size was 2.91.

In the village, the population was spread out, with 19.9% under the age of 18, 6.4% from 18 to 24, 22.4% from 25 to 44, 24.6% from 45 to 64, and 26.7% who were 65 years of age or older. The median age was 46 years. For every 100 females, there were 85.7 males. For every 100 females age 18 and over, there were 78.3 males.

The median income for a household in the village was $42,381, and the median income for a family was $56,667. Males had a median income of $35,163 versus $24,286 for females. The per capita income for the village was $19,492. About 0.7% of families and 5.7% of the population were below the poverty line, including 2.7% of those under age 18 and 8.5% of those age 65 or over.

== Government ==
Primary authority for law enforcement protection in the Village of Whiting is provided by the Portage County Sheriff's Department. Fire protection service for the Village of Whiting Wisconsin is provided by the Plover Fire Department

The Village of Whiting's Public Works department deals with all aspects of village service, such as the water system, parks, roads, and snow removal.

== Economy ==
- Whiting is home to Neenah Paper Inc. and The Worth Company.

== Transportation ==
Public transit service to Whiting is provided by Central Transportation.
