= Wisconsin's Green County Assembly district =

Former American legislative district

Wisconsin's Green County State Assembly district
- Obsolete
- Notes: 1848–1852; 1871–1876; 1892–1964

Wisconsin's Green County Assembly district was a district in the Wisconsin State Assembly for much of the history of the state of Wisconsin, up to the legislative redistricting reforms of 1972 which created the current numbered districts. Located in central Wisconsin, the district comprised the whole of Green County, Wisconsin, and was one of the 66 original Assembly districts defined in Article XIV of the Constitution of Wisconsin.

The district was in use for elections from 1848 through 1851, then again for elections from 1871 to 1876, and again from 1892 to 1964.

== List of representatives ==
List of representatives from the Green County district
Member	Party	Residence	Term start	Term end	Leg.
District created
Henry Adams	Dem.	Monticello	June 5, 1848	January 1, 1849	1st
John C. Crawford	Whig	Monroe	January 1, 1849	January 7, 1850	2nd
William Comstock Green	Dem.	York	January 7, 1850	January 6, 1851	3rd
Julius Hulburt	Whig	Albany	January 6, 1851	January 5, 1852	4th
Truman J. Safford	Whig	Exeter	January 5, 1852	January 3, 1853	5th
Thomas Fenton	Dem.	Attica	January 3, 1853	January 2, 1854	6th
Abner Mitchell	Whig	Spring Grove	January 2, 1854	January 1, 1855	7th
Amos D. Kirkpatrick	Rep.	Dayton	January 1, 1855	January 7, 1856	8th
Martin Flood	Rep.	Brooklyn	January 7, 1856	January 5, 1857	9th
District abolished by 1856 Wisconsin Act 109; Green County divided into the Green 1st and Green 2nd districts
District re-established by 1871 Wisconsin Act 156
Marshal H. Pengra	Rep.	Sylvester	January 1, 1872	January 6, 1873	25th
John Luchsinger	Rep.	New Glarus	January 6, 1873	January 5, 1874	26th
Charles Rankin Deniston	Rep.	Cadiz	January 5, 1874	January 1, 1877	27th 28th 29th
District abolished by 1876 Wisconsin Act 343; Green County divided into the Green 1st and Green 2nd districts
District re-established by 1892 Wisconsin Special Session 2 Act 1
Henry Putnam	Rep.	Brodhead	January 2, 1893	January 7, 1895	41st
Nathaniel B. Treat	Rep.	Monroe	January 7, 1895	January 2, 1899	42nd 43rd
Adam Clarke Dodge	Rep.	Monroe	January 2, 1899	January 5, 1903	44th 45th
Andrew S. Douglas	Rep.	Brodhead	January 5, 1903	January 2, 1905	46th
Fred Ties	Rep.	Brodhead	January 2, 1905	January 4, 1909	47th 48th
A. B. Comstock	Rep.	Albany	January 4, 1909	January 2, 1911	49th
Willis Ludlow	Dem.	Monroe	January 2, 1911	January 6, 1913	50th
S. A. Schindler	Rep.	New Glarus	January 6, 1913	January 6, 1919	51st 52nd 53rd
William Olson	Rep.	Jordan	January 6, 1919	January 1, 1923	54th 55th
Fred K. Hefty	Rep.		January 1, 1923	January 5, 1925	56th
William Olson	Rep.	Monroe	January 5, 1925	January 3, 1927	57th
Ernst J. Hoesly	Prog.Rep.	New Glarus	January 3, 1927	January 7, 1935	58th 59th 60th 61st
Ernst J. Hoesly	Prog.	New Glarus	January 7, 1935	January 2, 1939	62nd 63rd
Harry A. Keegan	Rep.	Monroe	January 2, 1939	January 6, 1947	64th 65th 66th 67th
Ray H. Schoonover	Rep.	Monroe	January 6, 1947	January 7, 1957	68th 69th 70th 71st 72nd
Christian M. Stauffer	Rep.	Monticello	January 7, 1957	January 7, 1963	73rd 74th 75th
Christian M. Stauffer	Rep.	Monticello	January 7, 1963	October 15, 1963	76th
--Vacant--			October 15, 1963	April 13, 1964	76th
G. Fred Galli	Rep.	Monroe	April 13, 1964	January 4, 1965	76th
District abolished by State ex rel. Reynolds v. Zimmerman, 23 Wis. 2d 606 (1964); Green County became part of the Green–Lafayette district
