= 18th Wisconsin Infantry Regiment =

Union Army infantry regiment

- Flag of Wisconsin
- Active: March 15, 1862 – July 18, 1865
- Country: United States
- Allegiance: Union
- Branch: Infantry
- Size: Regiment
- Engagements: American Civil War: Battle of Shiloh; Second Battle of Corinth; Vicksburg Campaign; Battle of Port Gibson; Battle of Champion Hill; Siege of Vicksburg; Atlanta campaign; Battle of Allatoona Pass; Sherman's March to the Sea; Carolinas campaign; Battle of Bentonville; Bennett House Surrender

Commanders
- Colonel: James S. Alban
- Colonel: Gabriel Bouck
- Lt. Colonel: Charles H. Jackson

The 18th Wisconsin Infantry Regiment was a volunteer infantry regiment that served in the Union Army in the western theater of the American Civil War. A large portion of the regiment was captured in their first battle, at Shiloh, but they went on to participate in the Vicksburg Campaign, and Sherman's campaigns in Georgia and the Carolinas. For much of the war, the regiment was commanded by Gabriel Bouck, who would later become a U.S. congressman and speaker of the Wisconsin State Assembly.

== Service ==
The 18th Wisconsin was organized at Milwaukee, Wisconsin, and mustered into Federal service March 15, 1862.

The regiment was mustered out on July 18, 1865, at Louisville, Kentucky.

Organization of Regiment in 1861.
Company	Earliest Moniker	Primary Places of Recruitment	Earliest Captain
A	Taycheedah Union Guards	Fond du Lac, Lamartine, Gravesville, Charlestown, and Neillsville.	James P. Millard
B	Eagle Light Infantry	Monroe, Spring Grove, Brodhead, Argyle, Milwaukee, Glenmore, and Green County.	Charles Henry Jackson
C	Bad Axe Tigers	Viroqua, Springville, Sterling, Readstown, La Crosse, and Vernon County.	Newton May Layne†
D	Northernwestern Rangers	Sparta, Angelo, Franklin, Springville, Vernon and Monroe counties.	George Augustus Fisk
E	Northernwestern Light Infantry or Portage Light Infantry	Stockton, Plover, Linwood, Stevens Point, Belmont, and Portage County.	William Alexander Bremmer
F	Oshkosh Rangers/ Algoma Rifles	Oshkosh, Eureka, Eldorado, Rushford, Fond du Lac and Winnebago counties.	Joseph W. Roberts
G	Alban Pinery Rifles	Grand Rapids, Kilbourn, Portage, Green Bay, Oxford, Buena Vista, Portage and Wood counties.	John H. Compton†
H	Green Lake CountyRifles	Berlin, Waukau, Milwaukee, Poy Sippi, Neshkoro, Winnebago and Waushara counties.	David H. Saxton
I	Lewis Rangers	Columbus, Portage, Milwaukee, Dekorra, Elba, Pepin, Columbia, Dodge, and Pepin counties.	William A. Coleman
K	Union Guards	Monroe, Plover, Big Spring, Columbus, and New Haven among other cities.	William J. Kershaw

== Casualties ==
The 18th Wisconsin suffered 4 officers and 52 enlisted men killed in action or who later died of their wounds, plus another 2 officers and 167 enlisted men who died of disease, for a total of 225 fatalities.

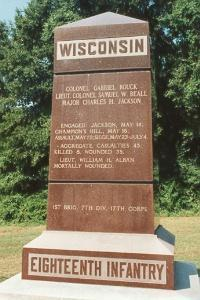
Monument to the 18th Wisconsin Volunteer Infantry located at Vicksburg National Military Park, Mississippi.

== Commanders ==
- Colonel James S. Alban (March 15, 1862 – April 7, 1862) was killed at the Battle of Shiloh. Before the war he had been a Wisconsin state senator.
- Colonel Gabriel Bouck (April 29, 1862 – January 4, 1864) was commissioned colonel after serving a year as captain of Co. E in the 2nd Wisconsin Infantry Regiment. He resigned in 1864. Before the war he had been the 6th attorney general of Wisconsin. After the war he became the 24th speaker of the Wisconsin State Assembly, and served two years in the United States House of Representatives.
- Lt. Colonel Charles H. Jackson (January 4, 1864 – July 18, 1865) began the war as captain of Co. B, and was promoted to major in 1862 and lieutenant colonel in 1864. He was designated for promotion to colonel but never mustered into federal service at that rank. He was the younger brother of Thomas A. Jackson, who was also an officer in this regiment.

== Notable people ==
- Jeremiah Wallace Baldock was enlisted in Co. K and rose to the rank of sergeant. He was captured at Shiloh and later designated for a commission as second lieutenant, but was never mustered into federal service at that rank. After the war he became a Wisconsin state legislator.
- Samuel Beall was lieutenant colonel of the regiment. He was severely wounded at Shiloh and lost a leg. After leaving the regiment, he was commissioned as a major in the Veteran Reserve Corps and served as overseer of a prisoner of war camp. Before the war he had been Wisconsin's 2nd lieutenant governor.
- Phineas A. Bennett, son of Alden I. Bennett, was second lieutenant in Co. K, was wounded at Shiloh and discharged.
- Edward Colman was first lieutenant of Co. A and later became adjutant of the regiment. He was wounded twice—at Shiloh and Champion Hill. After the war he became a Wisconsin state senator.
- Ira Ford was first lieutenant and later captain of Co. I. He was wounded and taken prisoner at Shiloh. After the war he became a Wisconsin state legislator.
- Thomas A. Jackson was first lieutenant and later captain of Co. B. He was captured at Shiloh but paroled after seven months captivity. After the war he became a Wisconsin state legislator.
- Addison W. Merrill was enlisted in Co. H and rose to the rank of corporal. After the war he became a Wisconsin state legislator.
- Fred Ties was enlisted in Co. B and rose to the rank of first sergeant. He was wounded and captured at Jackson, Mississippi, and later designated for a commission as second lieutenant, but was never mustered into federal service at that rank. After the war he became a Wisconsin state legislator.

== See also ==
- List of Wisconsin Civil War units
- Wisconsin in the American Civil War
