= Thomas A. Jackson (Wisconsin politician) =

19th century American politician

Member of the Wisconsin State Assembly from the Green 2nd district
- In office January 4, 1869 – January 2, 1871
- Preceded by: Jacob Mason
- Succeeded by: Marshal H. Pengra

Personal details
- Born: March 2, 1829 Fayette County, Pennsylvania, U.S.
- Died: February 15, 1908 (aged 78) Black Hawk County, Iowa, U.S.
- Cause of death: Stroke
- Resting place: Greenwood Cemetery, Brodhead, Wisconsin
- Party: Republican
- Spouse: Mary Ann Morris (m. 1854–1908)
- Children: Marshall Jackson^{(b. 1856; died 1951)}; Emma Luella Jackson^{(b. 1860; died 1863)}; Jessie Belle Jackson^{(b. 1878; died 1897)}; six others
- Occupation: Farmer

Military service
- Allegiance: United States
- Branch/service: United States Volunteers; Union Army
- Years of service: 1861–1865 (USV)
- Rank: Captain, USV
- Unit: 18th Reg. Wis. Vol. Infantry
- Battles/wars: American Civil War: Battle of Shiloh; Vicksburg campaign; Atlanta campaign; Carolinas campaign

Thomas Andrew Jackson (March 2, 1829 – February 15, 1908) was an American farmer, Republican politician, and Wisconsin pioneer. He was a member of the Wisconsin State Assembly, representing the southern half of Green County during the 1869 and 1870 terms. Earlier, he served as a Union Army officer through the American Civil War.

== Early life ==
Thomas A. Jackson was born in Fayette County, Pennsylvania, in March 1829. He was raised there but received only one year of formal schooling. As the eldest child in his family, he was hired out to neighboring farms from the age of 12 to bring in money for the family. As a young man, he supplemented that income by teaching school in the winters. In 1854, he became involved with the Pennsylvania state militia and was captain of a Fayette County company known as the Falls City Guards.

He moved west to Wisconsin in 1856. He settled first at Beloit, Wisconsin, where he resided for two years. He then moved further west to the town of Spring Grove, Wisconsin, in Green County, where he established a farm. He remained there only briefly though, spending most of 1859, 1860, and 1861 working as a farmer at the "Scotch Settlement" just south of the Illinois border.

== Civil War service ==
At the outbreak of the American Civil War, Jackson joined a volunteer company known as the "Independent Scotch Infantry", but their company was not admitted to the service in the initial rounds of recruitment.

That fall, he and his brother returned to Green County, Wisconsin, where they commenced organizing a company of volunteers in Spring Grove. Their company was originally intended for the 13th Wisconsin Infantry Regiment, but were too late for that organization. They were instead organized into the 18th Wisconsin Infantry Regiment as Company B of that regiment. While the regiment was being organized in Milwaukee, he and his brother were commissioned first lieutenant and captain of their company, respectively.

The 18th Wisconsin Infantry mustered into federal service on March 15, 1862, and arrived at Pittsburg Landing, Tennessee, on April 5. Within 12 hours of arriving at the field, they were engaged in the Battle of Shiloh. The first hours of the battle were erratic and disorganized, with their division falling back through forested terrain. They eventually reformed a line of battle with other regiments of their division and fought for several hours in this position until the enemy had surrounded them on three sides. At that place, the colonel and major of the regiment were both killed and the lieutenant colonel was wounded. About 175 men of the regiment were captured, including Jackson.

Jackson remained a prisoner of war for nearly seven months until paroled in October. On his return to the regiment, he was promoted to captain of the company. He commanded his company through the rest of the war, participating in the Vicksburg campaign, and Sherman's campaigns through Georgia and the Carolinas.

== Postbellum career ==
After returning from the war, Jackson was elected town clerk of Spring Grove in April 1866 and held that office for seven terms. In the Fall of 1868, he was elected to the Wisconsin State Assembly running on the Republican Party ticket. He represented Green County's 2nd Assembly district, which then comprised the southern half of the county. He was re-elected in 1869. After his second term, he was appointed to the State Visiting Committee by the governor, but mostly retired to his farm.

In the late 1870s, he began operating as an underwriter for a fire insurance company in Iowa. He relocated full time to Black Hawk County, Iowa, in 1897.

He died after suffering two strokes on the morning of February 12, 1908.

== Personal life and family ==
Thomas Jackson was the eldest of eleven children of Elijah Jackson, a stone and brick mason. His brother Charles H. Jackson, who served with him in the Union Army, rose to the rank of lieutenant colonel.

Jackson married Mary Ann Morris of Fayette County, Pennsylvania, in 1854. They had nine children together. His wife and six children survived him.

== Electoral history ==
=== Wisconsin Assembly (1868, 1869) ===
Wisconsin Assembly, Green 2nd District Election, 1868
Party	Candidate	Votes	%	±%
General Election, November 3, 1868
Republican	Thomas A. Jackson	1,798	67.21%	+3.90%
Democratic	Christopher Seeber	877	32.79%	
Plurality		921	34.43%	+7.80%
Total votes		2,675	100.0%	+25.18%
Republican hold				

Wisconsin Assembly, Green 2nd District Election, 1869
Party	Candidate	Votes	%	±%
General Election, November 2, 1869
Republican	Thomas A. Jackson (incumbent)	1,285	64.64%	−2.58%
Democratic	Jacob Adams	703	35.36%	
Plurality		582	29.28%	-5.15%
Total votes		1,988	100.0%	-25.68%
Republican hold				

Wisconsin State Assembly
Preceded by Jacob Mason	Member of the Wisconsin State Assembly from the Green 2nd district January 4, 1869 – January 2, 1871	Succeeded by Marshal H. Pengra
