= A. B. Comstock =

American politician

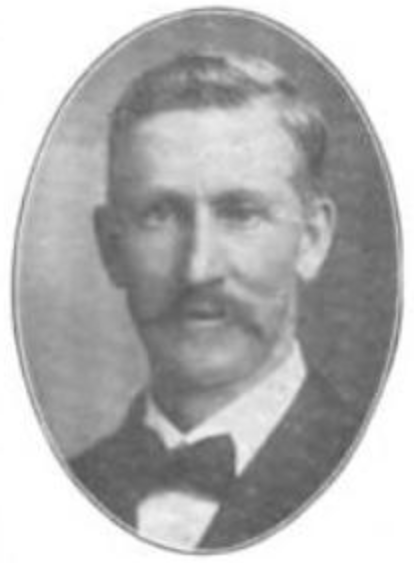

Member of the Wisconsin State Assembly from the Green County district
- In office January 4, 1909 – January 2, 1911
- Preceded by: Fred Ties
- Succeeded by: Willis Ludlow

Personal details
- Born: April 5, 1857 Albany, Green County, Wisconsin, U.S.
- Died: November 23, 1937 (aged 80) Albany, Green County, Wisconsin, U.S.
- Resting place: Hillcrest Cemetery, Albany, Green County, Wisconsin
- Party: Republican
- Spouses: Mary Jane Lewis (m. 1883; died 1913); Emma Comstock (m. 1916–1937)
- Children: 7
- Occupation: Farmer, gunsmith, politician

Albert Bion Comstock (April 5, 1857 – November 23, 1937) was an American farmer, businessman, and Republican politician from Green County, Wisconsin. He represented Green County in the Wisconsin State Assembly for the 49th Wisconsin Legislature (1909–1910). He was also an expert gunsmith and marksman, and was selected to represent the United States at marksmanship tournaments in Europe. He also served nearly 25 years on the Green County Board of Supervisors. His name was commonly abbreviated as A. B. Comstock.

== Biography ==
Comstock was born and raised and lived most of his life on his family's farm in the town of Albany, in Green County, Wisconsin. After his political career, he operated a gun shop in Albany. He was charged with embezzlement in 1931.

He died in Albany on November 23, 1937.

== Political career ==
Comstock was elected to the Assembly in 1908, where he served on the committees for roads and bridges, and for agriculture. Other positions he held include chairman of the Albany town board, and represented Albany as a member of the Green County Board of Supervisors. Comstock was a Republican.

Wisconsin State Assembly
Preceded by Fred Ties	Member of the Wisconsin State Assembly from the Green County district January 4, 1909 – January 2, 1911	Succeeded by Willis Ludlow
