= Austin Schulfer =

American baseball player (born 1995)

El Águila de Veracruz – No. 28
- Pitcher
- Born: December 22, 1995 (age 30); Plover, Wisconsin, U.S.
- Bats: Right Throws: Right

Austin Schulfer (born December 22, 1995) is an American professional baseball pitcher for El Águila de Veracruz of the Mexican League.

== Career ==
Schulfer played college baseball for the Milwaukee Panthers for four seasons. As a senior, he went 6–5 with a 2.96 ERA in 14 starts.

=== Minnesota Twins ===
Schulfer was drafted in the 19th round, with the 574th overall selection, of the 2018 Major League Baseball draft by the Minnesota Twins. After signing with the team, he was assigned to the Elizabethton Twins of the Rookie-level Appalachian League, where he went 3–0 with a 1.58 ERA in 11 appearances with seven starts. Schulfer spent the 2019 season with the Single–A Cedar Rapids Kernels of the Midwest League and went 7–6 with a 3.96 ERA and 124 strikeouts in 97 2/3 innings pitched. He did not play in a game in 2020 due to the cancellation of the minor league season because of the COVID-19 pandemic. Schulfer played for the Double-A Wichita Wind Surge in 2021 and had a 6–8 record with a 4.34 ERA in 24 starts. He returned to Wichita at the beginning of the 2022 season and was moved to a role as a relief pitcher. He made 15 appearances and had a 0.39 ERA before earning a promotion to the Triple-A St. Paul Saints.

Schulfer made 41 appearances for St. Paul during the 2023 season, posting a 7-3 record and 3.79 ERA with 51 strikeouts over 57 innings of work. Schulfer made 11 appearances for St. Paul in 2024, compiling a 5.09 ERA with 14 strikeouts across 17 2/3 innings pitched. He was released by the Twins organization on June 7, 2024.

=== Detroit Tigers ===
On June 13, 2024, Schulfer signed a minor league contract with the Detroit Tigers. In 23 appearances for the Triple-A Toledo Mud Hens, he logged a 3-1 record and 5.14 ERA with 45 strikeouts and one save over 35 innings of work; he also made two scoreless appearances for the Single-A Lakeland Flying Tigers. Schulfer elected free agency following the season on November 4.

=== Philadelphia Phillies ===
On December 12, 2024, Schulfer signed a minor league contract with the Philadelphia Phillies. He made 21 appearances for the Triple-A Lehigh Valley IronPigs, posting a 2-0 record and 5.57 ERA with 15 strikeouts over 21 innings of work. Schulfer was released by the Phillies organization on August 5, 2025.

=== El Águila de Veracruz ===
On April 14, 2026, Schulfer signed with El Águila de Veracruz of the Mexican League.
