= Thomas Fullerton (Wisconsin pioneer) =

Wisconsin and Minnesota pioneer minister (1817–1889)

Reverend Thomas M. Fullerton

6th Mayor of Stillwater, Minnesota
- In office April 1859 – April 1860
- Preceded by: A. B. Gorgas
- Succeeded by: Mahlon Black

Member of the Wisconsin State Assembly from the Iowa–Richland 2nd district
- In office January 7, 1850 – January 6, 1851
- Preceded by: Timothy Burns
- Succeeded by: Charles Rodolf

Personal details
- Born: June 1, 1817 Trigg County, Kentucky, U.S.
- Died: December 4, 1889 (aged 72) Mitchell County, Iowa, U.S.
- Resting place: Beaver Creek Cemetery, Douglas Township, Mitchell County, Iowa
- Party: Democratic
- Spouse: Jennet Angeline Jurney
- Children: John W. Fullerton^{(b. 1844; died 1845)}; Mary Fullerton^{(b. 1846; died 1846)}; Charles Henry Fullerton^{(b. 1852; died 1926)}; Albert Jurney Fullerton^{(b. 1857; died 1918)}
- Occupation: Methodist minister

Thomas M. Fullerton (June 1, 1817 – December 4, 1889) was an American Methodist minister, Democratic politician, and pioneer of Wisconsin and Minnesota. He served one term in the Wisconsin State Assembly, representing Iowa and Richland counties during the 3rd Wisconsin Legislature (1850), and later served as register of the U.S. Land Office at Stillwater, Minnesota, and served as the 6th mayor of Stillwater (1859). He wrote an account of early pioneer life in History of Iowa County, Wisconsin (1881), including the harrowing Cholera oubtreak of 1850.

== Biography ==
Thomas Fullerton was born in Trigg County, Kentucky, in 1817. As a young man, he moved west to the Wisconsin Territory in 1837. He performed some of the earliest Christian church services in what is now southwest Wisconsin, riding between what is now Iowa, Richland, and Sauk counties. He settled in Dodgeville in 1841.

In January 1847, the Wisconsin Territory House of Representatives voted to appoint Fullerton assistant clerk for the first session of the 5th Wisconsin Territorial Assembly.

In 1849, he was elected to the Wisconsin State Assembly, running on the Democratic Party ticket in the Iowa–Richland 2nd district. He served in the 3rd Wisconsin Legislature.

Fullerton then received the Democratic nomination for Wisconsin Senate in 1850, in the 5th Senate district, but lost the general election to Whig candidate Levi Sterling.

Shortly after 1850, Fullerton moved to Saint Paul, Minnesota, where he was a leader in the Methodist clergy. In 1853, he received federal appointment as register of the U.S. Land Office at Stillwater, Minnesota.

Fullerton opposed granting rights to African Americans, even those freed from slavery, and praised the U.S. Supreme Court's Dred Scott v. Sandford decision. His praise for the Dred Scott decision became a significant hot button in the Minnesota newspapers, as many prominent citizens added their disapproval. Fullerton was not retained for another term as register of the land office in 1857.

In 1859, Fullerton was elected mayor of Stillwater, running on the Democratic Party ticket, defeating Joel K. Reiner by four votes. He worked for the election of Stephen A. Douglas in the 1860 United States presidential election.

In the late 1860s, Fullerton resumed working as a traveling priest in western Wisconsin, eventually settling for three years in Green County, then in Shullsburg, Wisconsin, about 1880.

== Personal life and family ==
Thomas Fullerton married Jennet Angeline Jurney in 1843. They had at least four children together, though two died in infancy.

Fullerton and his wife went to live with their son, Albert, in Mitchell County, Iowa, in the mid-1880s. Thomas suffered strokes during 1889, and died there on December 4, 1889.

Wisconsin State Assembly
Preceded by Timothy Burns	Member of the Wisconsin State Assembly from the Iowa–Richland 2nd district January 7, 1850 – January 6, 1851	Succeeded by Charles Rodolf
Political offices
Preceded by A. B. Gorgas	Mayor of Stillwater, Minnesota; April 1859 – April 1860	Succeeded by Mahlon Black
