= Samuel Beall =

2nd Lieutenant Governor of Wisconsin, Union Army officer

Samuel W. Beall
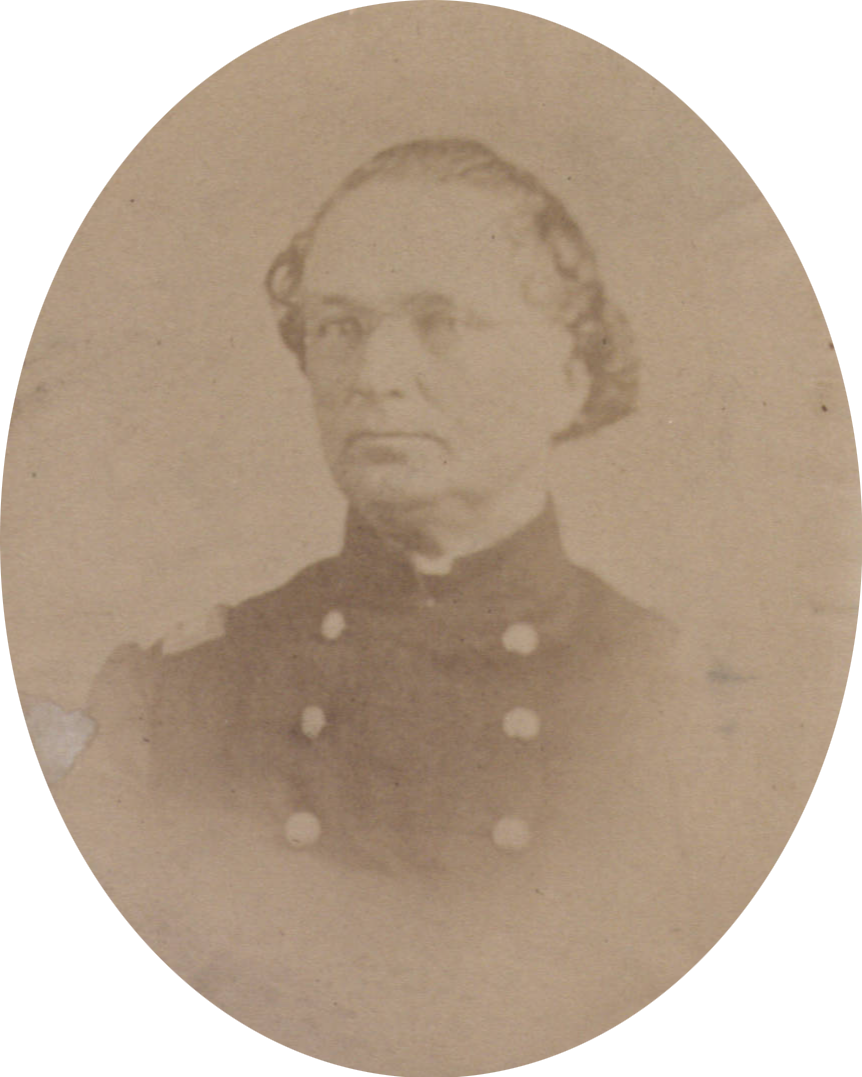

2nd Lieutenant Governor of Wisconsin
- In office January 7, 1850 – January 5, 1852
- Governor: Nelson Dewey
- Preceded by: John E. Holmes
- Succeeded by: Timothy Burns

Personal details
- Born: Samuel Wootton Beall; June 16, 1807 Montgomery County, Maryland, U.S.
- Died: September 26, 1868 (aged 61) Helena, Montana, U.S.
- Cause of death: Murdered
- Resting place: Forestvale Cemetery, Helena, Montana
- Party: Democratic
- Spouse: Elizabeth Fenimore Cooper
- Children: Singleton Wooten Beall; ^{b. 1830; died 1911)}; Mary Morris (Hubbell); ^{b. 1832; died 1866)}; Emma Cooper (LeFevre); ^{b. 1835; died 1926)}; Ellen Agnes (Cone); ^{b. 1841; died 1924)}; Louis Upton Beall; ^{b. 1844; died 1868)}; 2 others
- Parents: Lewis Beall (father); Eliza Beall (mother)
- Education: Union College
- Profession: Lawyer, land speculator, politician

Military service
- Allegiance: United States
- Branch/service: United States Volunteers; Union Army
- Years of service: 1861–1865
- Rank: Lt. Colonel, USV
- Unit: 18th Reg. Wis. Vol. Infantry
- Battles/wars: American Civil War: Battle of Shiloh (WIA)

Samuel Wootton Beall (June 16, 1807 – September 26, 1868) was an American land speculator, lawyer, and Wisconsin pioneer. He was the second lieutenant governor of Wisconsin (1850–1852) and lost his leg at the Battle of Shiloh, as a Union Army officer in the American Civil War.

== Early life ==
Born in Montgomery County, Maryland, Beall graduated from Union College in Schenectady, New York, in 1827.

== Career ==
Beall moved to what is now Green Bay, Wisconsin, in 1835, where he made a fortune in land speculation, and was admitted to the bar and practiced law. In the 1840s, he settled in Taycheedah.

Between 1832 and 1856, Beall loaned the Stockbridge and Munsee Indians' delegations to Washington, D.C. some $3,000 for their expenses while they pursued claims against the federal government. He was promised one third of whatever they recovered, but when they won their case, he claimed and recovered only his actual expenditures.

Beall was a delegate to both the first and second Wisconsin constitutional conventions from Marquette County, one of only six men to do so, as most members of the first convention declined to serve in the second.

Beall was a Democrat and was lieutenant governor for Nelson Dewey's second term as governor, from 1850 until 1852.

In December 1859, Beall was appointed by the Denver Town Company to lobby for Colorado's representation in Washington.

During the American Civil War, he was commissioned as a lieutenant colonel of the 18th Wisconsin Infantry Regiment under Colonel James S. Alban. The 18th Wisconsin was organized in February 1862, proceeded to Tennessee in March, and was thrown into battle at Shiloh a day after its arrival. Beall was wounded in the battle and his leg was amputated below the knee. Colonel Alban was killed, along with the Regiment's third-in-command, Major Josiah W. Crane. After recovering, Beall was second-in-command of a prisoner of war camp in Elmira, New York, where the prisoners nicknamed him "old peg-leg" and accused him of a pattern of repeated cruelty and abuse.

== Death ==
After briefly returning to Wisconsin after the war, Beall moved to Helena, Montana, where, on September 26, 1868, he was shot following an argument with a newspaper editor. He was re-interred in 1907 at Forestvale Cemetery in Helena.

== Family life ==
The son of Lewis and Eliza Beall, in 1829, he married Elizabeth Fenimore Cooper, a niece of James Fenimore Cooper, and they had seven children. His eldest daughter, Mary Morris Beall, was the second wife of Levi Hubbell, a prominent Wisconsin lawyer, judge and Democratic politician in early Wisconsin.

== Electoral history ==
Wisconsin Lieutenant Gubernatorial Election, 1849
Party	Candidate	Votes	%	±%
General Election, November 6, 1849
Democratic	Samuel Beall	16,446	52.33%	−5.37pp
Whig	Timothy O. Howe	10,983	34.95%	−7.35pp
Free Soil	John Bannister	3,976	12.65%	
	Scattering	21	0.07%	
Plurality		5,463	17.38%	+1.98pp
Total votes		31,426	100.0%	-7.40%
Democratic hold				

Party political offices
Preceded by John Edwin Holmes	Democratic nominee for Lieutenant Governor of Wisconsin; 1849	Succeeded by Timothy Burns
Political offices
Preceded by John Edwin Holmes	Lieutenant Governor of Wisconsin; 1850–1852	Succeeded by Timothy Burns
