= Wisconsin's Iowa–Richland 2nd Assembly district =

Former American legislative district

Wisconsin's Iowa–Richland 2nd State Assembly district
- Obsolete
- Notes: 1848–1852

Wisconsin's Iowa–Richland 2nd Assembly district was a district in the Wisconsin State Assembly in the early years of the history of the state of Wisconsin, prior to the legislative redistricting reforms of 1972 which created the current numbered districts. Located in southwest Wisconsin, the district comprised the whole of Richland County and the northern half of Iowa County, Wisconsin, and was one of the 66 original Assembly districts defined in Article XIV of the Constitution of Wisconsin.

The district was in use for elections from 1848 through 1851.

== List of representatives ==
List of representatives from the Iowa–Richland 2nd district
Member	Party	Residence	Term start	Term end	Leg.
District created
Thomas Jenkins	Dem.	Dodgeville	June 5, 1848	January 1, 1849	1st
Timothy Burns	Dem.	Clyde	January 1, 1849	January 7, 1850	2nd
Thomas M. Fullerton	Dem.	Dodgeville	January 7, 1850	January 6, 1851	3rd
Charles Rodolf	Dem.	Highland	January 6, 1851	January 5, 1852	4th
Luman M. Strong	Dem.	Highland	January 5, 1852	January 3, 1853	5th
District abolished by 1852 Wisconsin Act 499; Iowa County was divided into the Iowa 1st and Iowa 2nd districts Richland County became a single-county Assembly district
