= Walter D. McIndoe =

American politician (1819–1872)

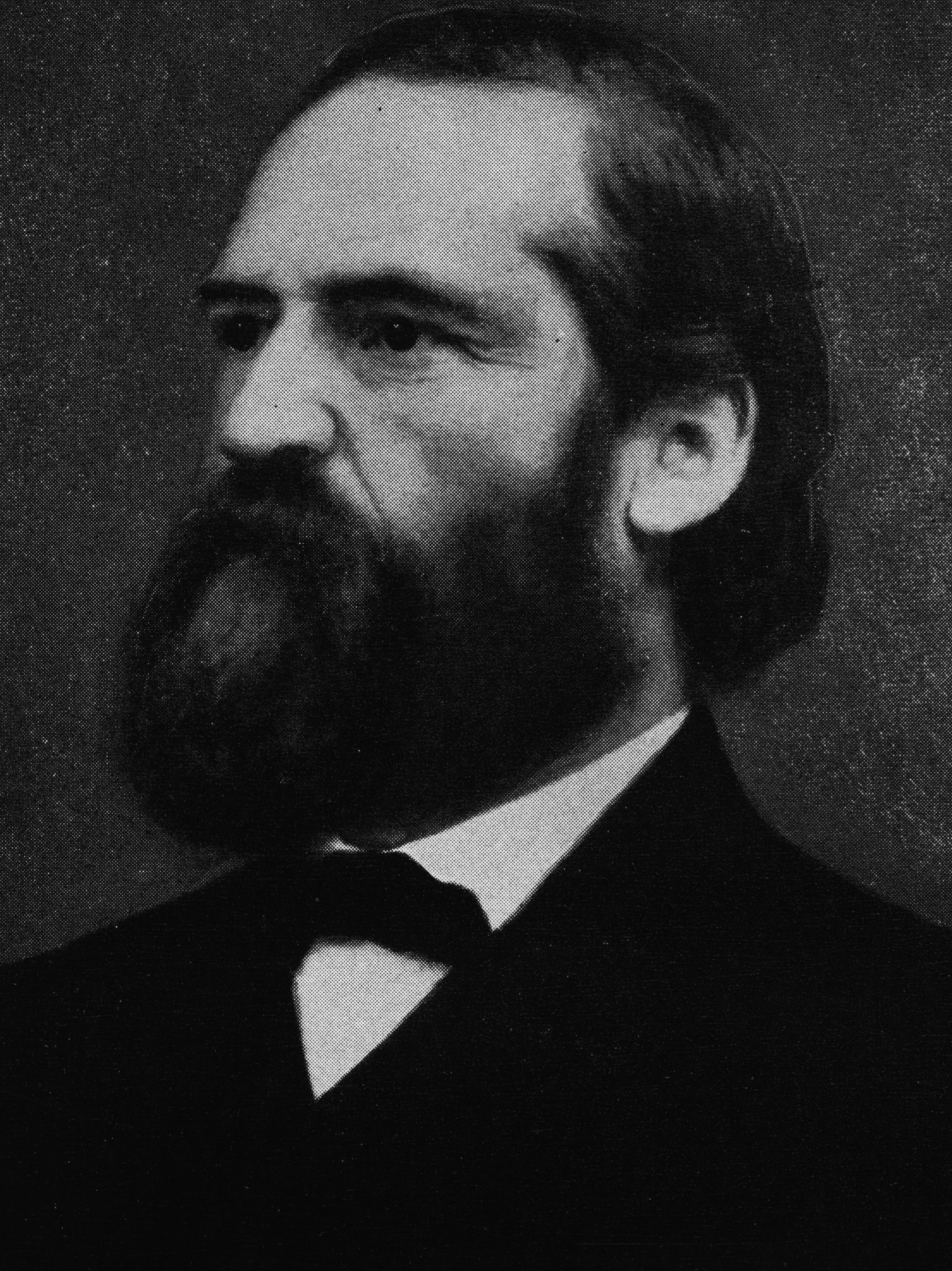

Member of the U.S. House of Representatives from Wisconsin
- In office January 26, 1863 – March 3, 1867
- Preceded by: Luther Hanchett (2nd); District established (6th)
- Succeeded by: Ithamar Sloan (2nd); Cadwallader C. Washburn (6th)
- Constituency: 2nd district (1863); 6th district (1863-67)

Member of the Wisconsin State Assembly
- In office January 11, 1854 – January 9, 1856
- Preceded by: George W. Cate
- Succeeded by: Joseph Wood
- Constituency: Marathon–Portage district
- In office January 9, 1850 – January 8, 1851
- Preceded by: John Delaney
- Succeeded by: Thomas J. Morman (Marathon–Portage)
- Constituency: Portage district

Personal details
- Born: Walter Duncan McIndoe; March 30, 1819 Dumbartonshire, Scotland, U.K.
- Died: August 22, 1872 (aged 53) Wausau, Wisconsin, U.S.
- Resting place: Pine Grove Cemetery; Wausau, Wisconsin
- Party: Republican; National Union (1864-1865); Whig (before 1854)
- Spouse: Catherine Harriet Ann Taylor (m. 1845)

Walter Duncan McIndoe (March 30, 1819 – August 22, 1872) was a Scottish American immigrant, lumber industrialist, Republican politician, and Wisconsin pioneer. He served two terms in the U.S. House of Representatives, representing Wisconsin's 6th congressional district for the 38th and 39th congresses (1863–1867). He previously served three terms in the Wisconsin State Assembly (1850, 1854, 1855), representing Portage County.

== Early life and career ==
Born in Dunbartonshire, Scotland, McIndoe immigrated to the United States in 1834. He engaged in business in New York, Charleston, and St. Louis, finally settling in the Wisconsin Territory in 1845 where he became involved in the lumber business.

== Political career ==
He served as a member of the Wisconsin State Assembly in 1850, 1854, and 1855. In 1850 as a member of the Assembly he introduced a bill changing the name of his home community from "Big Bull Falls" to Wausau and creating Marathon County. Initially a Whig, in 1854 he became a member of the newly formed Republican Party.

=== Campaign for governor ===
He was a candidate for the Republican nomination for Governor of Wisconsin at the 1857 Republican state convention, contending with Edward Dwight Holton, with both candidates losing to the eventual nominee and governor, Alexander Randall.

During the American Civil War he was provost marshal of Wisconsin.

=== Congress ===
McIndoe was first elected to Congress in the December 1862 special election to replace Congressman Luther Hanchett, who died three weeks after the 1862 general election. Hanchett was the incumbent in Wisconsin's 2nd congressional district and, in the 1862 general election, had been elected to Wisconsin's newly-created 6th congressional district. McIndoe's election allowed him to replace Hanchett for the last months of the 37th Congress and also for the full term of the 38th Congress. He was subsequently re-elected in 1864 to the 39th Congress, ultimately serving from January 26, 1863, until March 3, 1867.

During the Thirty-ninth Congress, he served as chairman of the House Committee on Revolutionary Pensions.

=== Retirement ===
In 1866, McIndoe declined candidacy for renomination, instead resuming his interests in the lumber business.

== Death and burial ==
He died in Wausau, Wisconsin, on August 22, 1872, and was interred at Pine Grove Cemetery.

== Electoral history ==
=== U.S. House of Representatives (1862, 1864) ===
Wisconsin's 2nd Congressional District Special Election, 1862
Party	Candidate	Votes	%	±%
Special Election, December 30, 1862
Republican	Walter D. McIndoe	7,070	57.29%	+0.13%
Democratic	Charles S. Benton	5,271	42.71%	
Plurality		1,799	14.58%	+0.25%
Total votes		12,341	100.0%	-21.94%
Republican hold				

Wisconsin's 6th Congressional District Election, 1864
Party	Candidate	Votes	%	±%
General Election, November 8, 1864
National Union	Walter D. McIndoe (incumbent)	13,462	66.31%	+9.02%
Democratic	Henry Reed	6,840	33.69%	
Plurality		6,622	32.62%	+18.04%
Total votes		20,302	100.0%	+64.51%
Republican hold				

U.S. House of Representatives
Preceded by Luther Hanchett	Member of the U.S. House of Representatives from Wisconsin's 2nd congressional district January 26, 1863 – March 3, 1863	Succeeded by Ithamar Sloan
New district	Member of the U.S. House of Representatives from Wisconsin's 6th congressional district March 4, 1863 – March 3, 1867	Succeeded by Cadwallader C. Washburn
