= Luther Hanchett =

19th century American politician and businessman

Member of the U.S. House of Representatives from Wisconsin's 2nd district
- In office March 4, 1861 – November 24, 1862
- Preceded by: Cadwallader C. Washburn
- Succeeded by: Walter D. McIndoe

Member of the Wisconsin Senate from the 27th district
- In office January 1, 1857 – January 1, 1861
- Preceded by: Position Established
- Succeeded by: Edward L. Browne

District Attorney of Portage County
- In office January 1, 1853 – January 1, 1855

Personal details
- Born: Luther Hanchett; October 25, 1825 Middlebury, Ohio, U.S.
- Died: November 24, 1862 (aged 37) Plover, Wisconsin, U.S.
- Resting place: Plover Cemetery, Plover
- Party: Republican
- Spouses: Lucinda Alban; (m. 1853; died 1928)
- Children: 1 son; 1 daughter
- Parents: Dr. Luther Hanchett (father); Anna (Kent) (Buckland) Hanchett (mother)
- Relatives: Ralph Pomeroy Buckland (half-brother)

Luther Hanchett (October 25, 1825 – November 24, 1862) was an American lawyer, Republican politician, and Wisconsin pioneer. He served one term in the U.S. House of Representatives, representing Wisconsin's 2nd congressional district during the 37th Congress, from 1861 until his death in 1862. He previously served four years in the Wisconsin Senate (1857–1861), representing north-central Wisconsin, and served as district attorney of Portage County, Wisconsin.

== Biography ==
Born in Middlebury, Ohio, Hanchett attended the common schools. He studied law in Ohio and was admitted to the bar in 1846. He became a practicing attorney in Fremont, Ohio, but moved to Portage County, Wisconsin, in 1849. He engaged in lumber and mining enterprises and was elected District Attorney of Portage County for two years. For a short time he was engaged in a partnership with James S. Alban, and, on November 11, 1853, he married Alban's daughter, Lucinda. In 1856, he was elected to represent Marathon, Portage, Waupaca, Waushara, and Wood counties in the newly created 27th district of the Wisconsin State Senate. He was re-elected in 1858.

Hanchett was elected as a Republican to the 37th United States Congress to represent Wisconsin's 2nd congressional district and served from March 4, 1861, until his death in Plover, Wisconsin, November 24, 1862. He was interred in Plover Cemetery.

== Courtwright lynching ==
Hanchett's death has another unfortunate legacy in Portage County. When he was first elected to the Wisconsin Senate in 1856, he sought to extricate himself from a partnership with Amos Courtwright in a lumber mill. They agreed on a settlement of $2,000 to be paid to Hanchett for his share of the company, but, as Courtwright was unable to pay immediately, a mortgage was created for the amount to be owed to Hanchett. At the time of his death in 1862, the payment was still outstanding to the estate of Mr. Hanchett.

In 1867, Hanchett's former law partner, James Oliver Raymond, married his widow, Lucinda, and pressed the claim, seeking to seize a part of the property owned by Courtwright. In 1870 a court ruled in favor of Raymond, but Courtwright refused to be evicted from his property. In 1875, County Sheriff Joseph H. Baker came to the property to execute a writ of restitution against the Courtwrights. During the attempt, Sheriff Baker was shot and killed by Isaiah Courtwright, the brother of Amos. The Courtwrights were arrested by the sheriff's posse and taken to Stevens Point, where, a few days later, a mob of about 12 to 40 men dragged them from the jail and hanged them.

== See also ==
- List of members of the United States Congress who died in office (1790–1899)

== Sources ==
- United States Congress. "Luther Hanchett (id: H000145)". Biographical Directory of the United States Congress.

U.S. House of Representatives
Preceded by Cadwallader C. Washburn	Member of the U.S. House of Representatives from Wisconsin's 2nd congressional district March 4, 1861 - November 24, 1862	Succeeded by Walter D. McIndoe
