= Addison W. Merrill =

American politician

Addison W. Merrill (May 30, 1842 – November 15, 1920) was a member of the Wisconsin State Assembly.

== Biography ==
Merrill was born on May 30, 1842, in Lowell, Massachusetts. He later resided in Princeton, Wisconsin and became a farmer.

During the American Civil War, Merrill served with the 18th Wisconsin Volunteer Infantry Regiment of the Union Army. Conflicts he participated in include the Battle of Jackson, Mississippi, the Battle of Champion Hill and the Siege of Vicksburg. Merrill died at home in Alma Center, Wisconsin on November 15, 1920.

== Political career ==
Merrill was elected to the Assembly in 1896. Additionally, he was a member of the town board (similar to the city council) of Garden Valley, Wisconsin and of the board of supervisors of Jackson County, Wisconsin. He was a Republican.
