= Harley M. Jacklin =

American farmer, businessman, and politician

Harley M. Jacklin (August 20, 1889 – December 6, 1970) was an American farmer, businessman, and politician.

Born in Redgranite, Wisconsin, in the town of Springwater, Waushara County, Wisconsin, Jacklin took an agriculture course at University of Wisconsin. He was the foreman at the Marshfield Experiment Station from 1917 to 1922. He then raised Holstein cattle with his son in Plover, Wisconsin. Later, he operated a supply company. From 1945 to 1947, Jackin served in the Wisconsin State Senate and was a Democrat. Jacklin died at his home in Plover, Wisconsin.
