= Redgranite, Wisconsin =

- Village
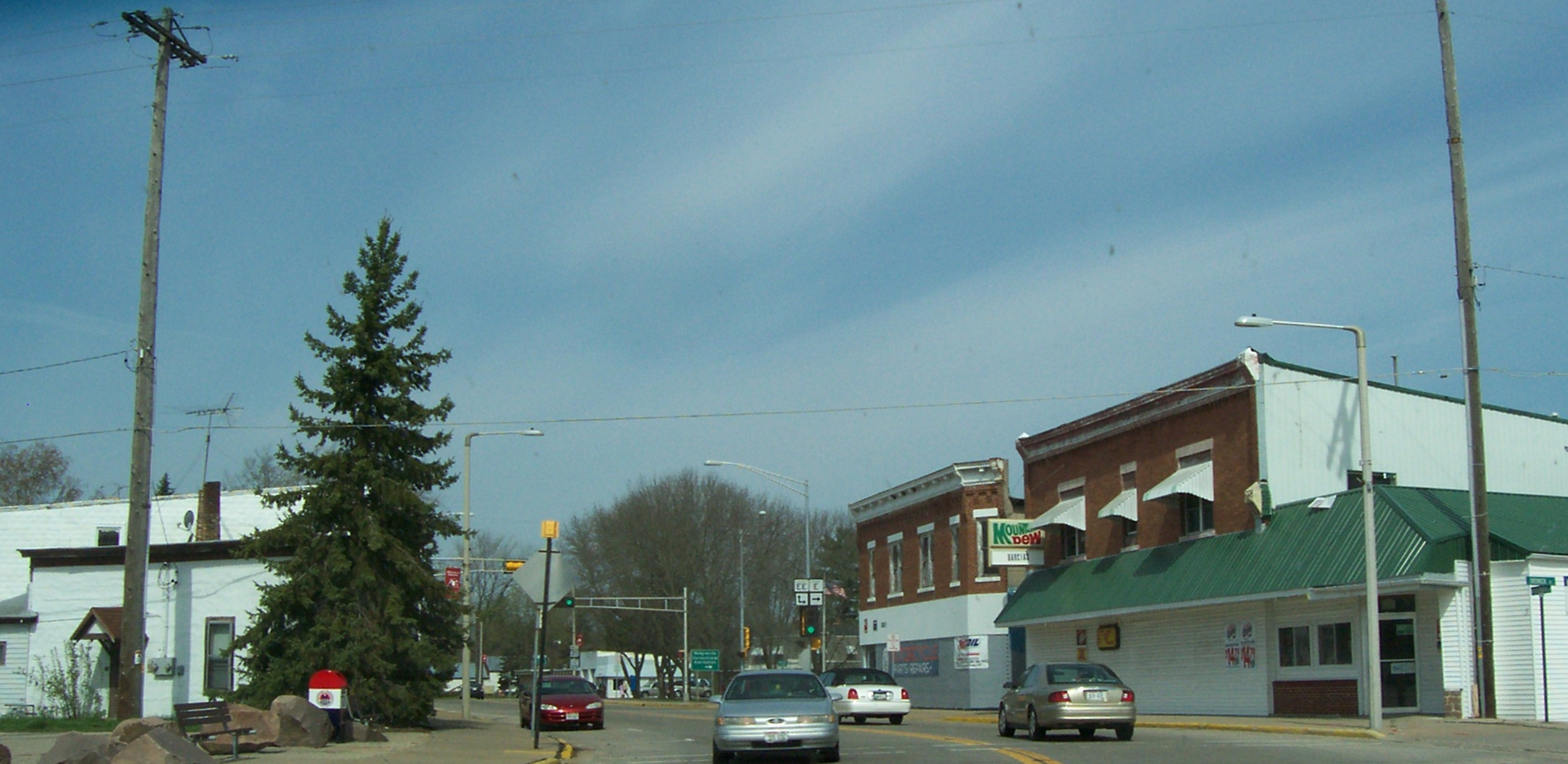
- Downtown Redgranite, Wisconsin

- Location of Redgranite in Waushara County, Wisconsin.
- Coordinates: 44°2′40″N 89°6′7″W
- Country: United States
- State: Wisconsin
- County: Waushara

Area
  - Total: 2.37 sq mi (6.15 km^{2})
  - Land: 2.36 sq mi (6.12 km^{2})
  - Water: 0.012 sq mi (0.03 km^{2})
- Elevation: 791 ft (241 m)

Population (2020)
  - Total: 2,061
  - Density: 872/sq mi (337/km^{2})
- Time zone: UTC-6 (Central (CST))
  - Summer (DST): UTC-5 (CDT)
- Area code: 920
- FIPS code: 55-66625
- GNIS feature ID: 1572163
- Website: Official website

Redgranite is a village in Waushara County, Wisconsin, United States. The population was 2,061 at the 2020 census.

== History ==
A post office called Redgranite has been in operation since 1897. The village was named after deposits of red granite in the area.

== Geography ==
Redgranite is located at 44°2′40″N 89°6′7″W (44.044550, -89.101993).

According to the United States Census Bureau, the village has a total area of 2.29 square miles (5.93 km^{2}), of which 2.28 square miles (5.91 km^{2}) is land and 0.01 square miles (0.03 km^{2}) is water.

== Demographics ==
Historical population
| Census | Pop. | Note | %± |
|---|---|---|---|
| 1910 | 1,521 | | — |
| 1920 | 1,012 | | −33.5% |
| 1930 | 977 | | −3.5% |
| 1940 | 857 | | −12.3% |
| 1950 | 648 | | −24.4% |
| 1960 | 588 | | −9.3% |
| 1970 | 645 | | 9.7% |
| 1980 | 976 | | 51.3% |
| 1990 | 1,009 | | 3.4% |
| 2000 | 1,040 | | 3.1% |
| 2010 | 2,149 | | 106.6% |
| 2020 | 2,061 | | −4.1% |
U.S. Decennial Census

=== 2010 census ===
As of the census of 2010, there were 2,149 people, 509 households, and 275 families living in the village. The population density was 942.5 inhabitants per square mile (363.9/km^{2}). There were 583 housing units at an average density of 255.7 per square mile (98.7/km^{2}). The racial makeup of the village was 77.4% White, 17.8% African American, 1.9% Native American, 0.1% Asian, 0.3% Pacific Islander, 1.4% from other races, and 1.2% from two or more races. Hispanic or Latino of any race were 3.0% of the population.

There were 509 households, of which 24.4% had children under the age of 18 living with them, 36.9% were married couples living together, 12.0% had a female householder with no husband present, 5.1% had a male householder with no wife present, and 46.0% were non-families. 39.7% of all households were made up of individuals, and 22.4% had someone living alone who was 65 years of age or older. The average household size was 2.17 and the average family size was 2.89.

The median age in the village was 39.3 years. 11.6% of residents were under the age of 18; 9% were between the ages of 18 and 24; 40.5% were from 25 to 44; 26.2% were from 45 to 64; and 12.9% were 65 years of age or older. The gender makeup of the village was 72.8% male and 27.2% female.

=== 2000 census ===
As of the census of 2000, there were 1,040 people, 440 households, and 268 families living in the village. The population density was 468.6 people per square mile (180.9/km^{2}). There were 493 housing units at an average density of 222.1 per square mile (85.7/km^{2}). The racial makeup of the village was 94.90% White, 0.87% African American, 1.15% Native American, 0.67% from other races, and 2.40% from two or more races. Hispanic or Latino of any race were 3.08% of the population.

There were 440 households, out of which 29.5% had children under the age of 18 living with them, 46.6% were married couples living together, 11.6% had a female householder with no husband present, and 38.9% were non-families. 32.5% of all households were made up of individuals, and 17.7% had someone living alone who was 65 years of age or older. The average household size was 2.30 and the average family size was 2.91.

In the village, the population was spread out, with 24.9% under the age of 18, 7.8% from 18 to 24, 24.6% from 25 to 44, 20.7% from 45 to 64, and 22.0% who were 65 years of age or older. The median age was 39 years. For every 100 females, there were 88.7 males. For every 100 females age 18 and over, there were 86.8 males.

The median income for a household in the village was $26,726, and the median income for a family was $34,875. Males had a median income of $27,109 versus $22,361 for females. The per capita income for the village was $13,994. About 6.2% of families and 11.1% of the population were below the poverty line, including 8.0% of those under age 18 and 10.0% of those age 65 or over.

== Notable people ==
- Harley M. Jacklin, Wisconsin State Senator and farmer, was born in Redgranite.

== Gallery ==
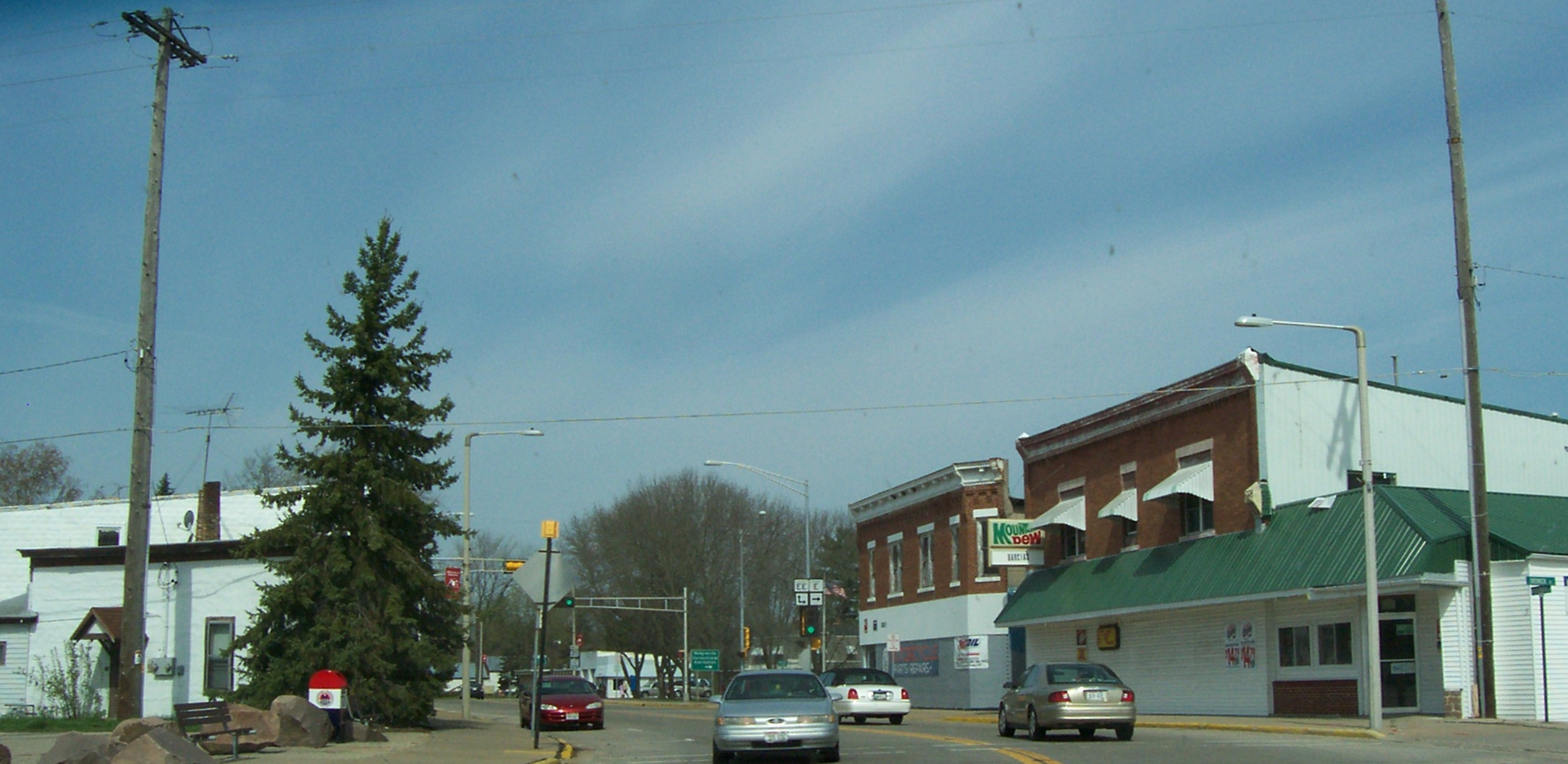
Downtown Redgranite

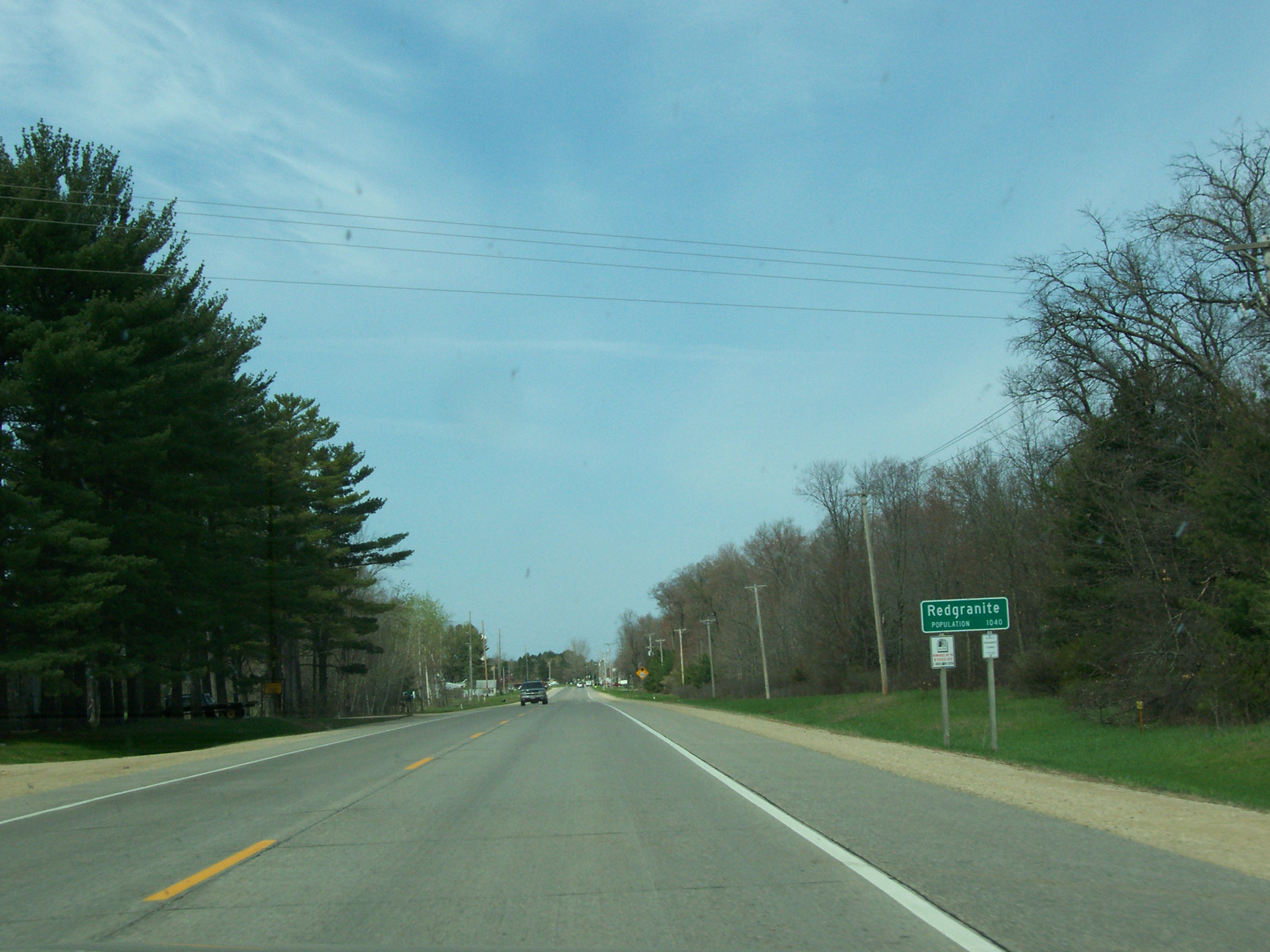
Looking west while entering Redgranite

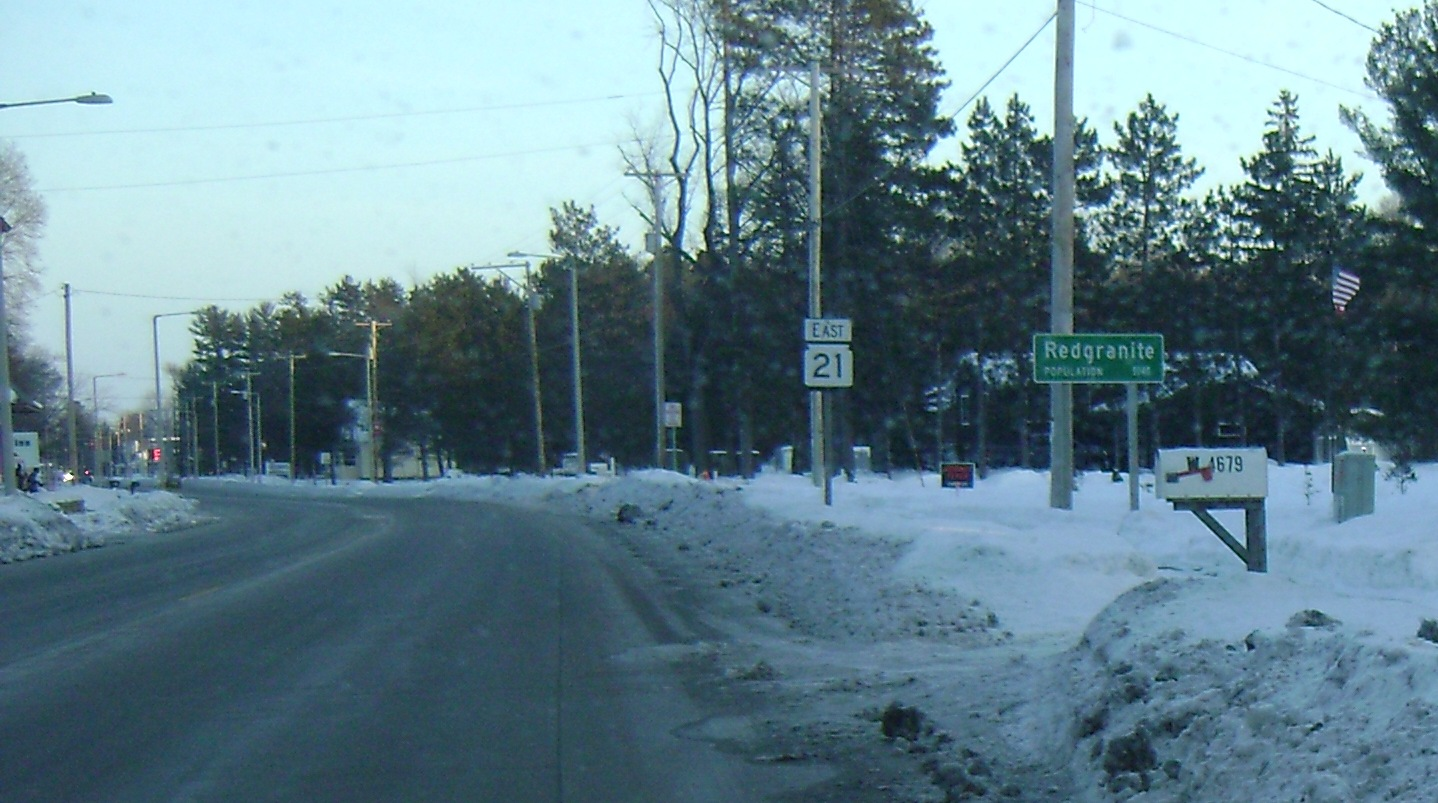
Approaching Looking east at Redgranite in winter

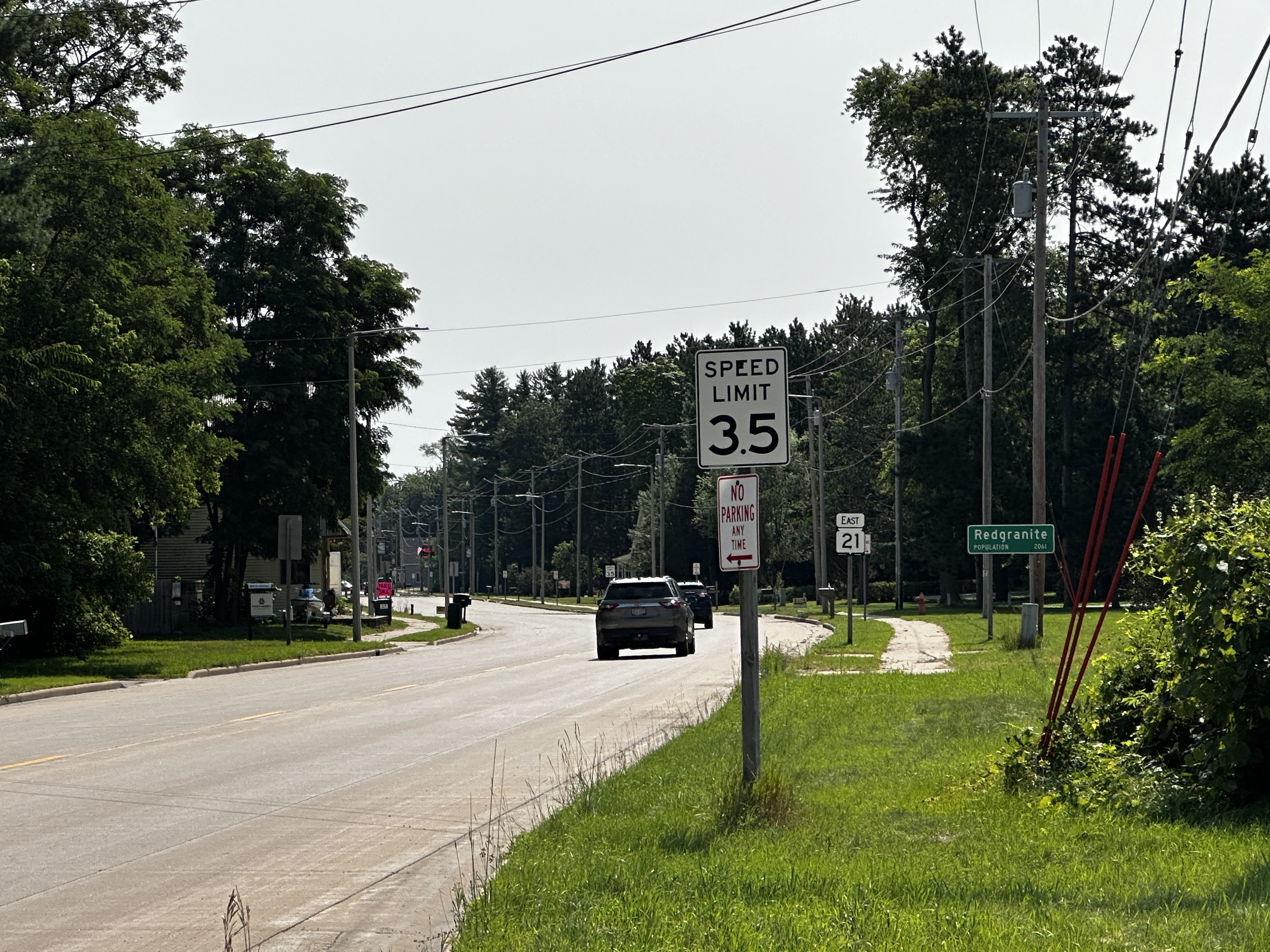
Redgranite pictured in July 2024
