= Fred Ties =

American politician

Member of the Wisconsin State Assembly from the Green County district
- In office January 2, 1905 – January 4, 1909
- Preceded by: Andrew S. Douglas
- Succeeded by: A. B. Comstock

Clerk of Green County, Wisconsin
- In office January 1, 1893 – January 1, 1899
- Preceded by: John Lemmel
- Succeeded by: James W. Lyman

Personal details
- Born: January 4, 1841 Hagedorn, Westphalia, Kingdom of Prussia
- Died: March 27, 1928 (aged 87) Brodhead, Wisconsin, U.S.
- Resting place: State Line Cemetery, Rock Grove Township, Stephenson County, Illinois
- Party: Republican
- Spouses: Rossie A. Emminger (died 1884); Jane Ann Mooney (m. 1886–1928)
- Children: Abbie S.^{(b. 1866)}; Harriet F. "Florrie" Ties^{(b. 1869; died 1881)}; "Nellie" Josephine (Lawver)^{(b. 1870; died 1956)}; Mary C.^{(b. 1873)}; Allethe J. "Letha" (O'Brien)^{(b. 1875; died 1957)}; James R. Ties^{(b. 1877)}; Fred M. Ties^{(b. 1880)}
- Occupation: Farmer

Military service
- Allegiance: United States
- Branch/service: United States Volunteers; Union Army
- Years of service: 1861–1865
- Rank: 1st Sergeant, USV
- Unit: 18th Reg. Wis. Vol. Infantry
- Battles/wars: American Civil War

Frederick J. Ties (January 4, 1841 – March 27, 1928) was a German American immigrant, farmer, and Republican politician. He was a member of the Wisconsin State Assembly, representing Green County during the 1905 and 1907 sessions. As a young man, he served in the Union Army throughout the American Civil War, and was wounded and taken prisoner at the Battle of Jackson, Mississippi.

== Early life and war service ==
Fred Ties was born January 4, 1841, in the village of Hagedorn, in what is now western Germany. At the time of his birth, it was the Province of Westphalia, in the Kingdom of Prussia. He was educated in the German public schools in Lippe-Detmold. In 1858, he emigrated to the United States with his parents and settled in the town of Spring Grove, Green County, Wisconsin, where he went to work as a farm hand.

At the outbreak of the American Civil War, he volunteered for service with the Union Army and was enrolled as a private in Company B of the 18th Wisconsin Infantry Regiment. The regiment mustered into service in March 1862, and almost immediately went into battle at Shiloh, where their colonel was killed and much of the regiment was captured.

After the regiment was reconstituted, it participated in the Vicksburg Campaign. During that campaign, he was wounded during a bayonet charge at the Battle of Jackson, Mississippi, and was taken prisoner. He was sent to Libby prison, but was paroled after a short time and returned to his regiment.

After returning from captivity, Ties was promoted to corporal, sergeant, and ultimately first sergeant. He achieved veteran status with his regiment by re-enlisting at the end of his three-year term of service and was also designated second lieutenant of his company, but was never officially mustered at that rank. At the end of the war, he marched with his regiment at the Grand Review of the Armies in Washington, D.C.

== Political career ==
After the war, Ties returned to Spring Grove and bought a farm, which he continued to operate for at least the next 40 years. He was elected town chairman three times and also served several terms as town assessor. He became active in the Republican Party of Wisconsin and was elected county clerk in 1892, running on the Republican Party ticket. He was re-elected in 1894 and 1896.

In 1899, he bought a home in the city of Brodhead, Wisconsin, which became his primary residence. In 1900, the county board elected him as superintendent of the poor and trustee of the Green County Insane Asylum. He was re-appointed in 1903 and 1906, and served as secretary of the board of trustees of the asylum. He was also elected to the Brodhead board of education in 1903 and 1907, and served as president of that board.

In 1904, he was elected to the Wisconsin State Assembly, running on the Republican ticket. His district comprised all of Green County. He was subsequently re-elected in 1906. The 1906 election was quite close, decided by less than 25 votes. His Democratic opponent in 1906, Monroe mayor Willis Ludlow, contested the results of that election, but Ties ultimately prevailed. He was not a candidate for re-election in 1908, and was succeeded by fellow Republican A. B. Comstock.

== Personal life and family ==
Fred Ties married twice. His first wife was Rossie Emminger, who had been an orphan and was adopted by Spring Grove farmer James R. Coulter. Ties had seven children with his first wife, though one died in childhood. Rossie Ties died in 1884. Ties subsequently remarried with Jane Mooney, but had no additional children.

Ties died at his home in Brodhead, Wisconsin. He was survived by his second wife and four adult children.

== Electoral history ==
=== Wisconsin Assembly (1904, 1906) ===
Wisconsin Assembly, Green County District Election, 1904
Party	Candidate	Votes	%	±%
General Election, November 8, 1904
Republican	Fred Ties	2,474	51.62%	−2.78%
Democratic	Willis Ludlow	2,039	42.54%	+2.03%
Prohibition	William Smiley	175	3.65%	−1.44%
Social Democratic	Peter R. Burns	105	2.19%	
Plurality		435	9.08%	-4.81%
Total votes		4,793	100.0%	+21.43%
Republican hold				

Wisconsin Assembly, Green County District Election, 1906
Party	Candidate	Votes	%	±%
General Election, November 2, 1906
Republican	Fred Ties (incumbent)	1,522	50.35%	−1.27%
Democratic	Willis Ludlow	1,501	49.65%	+7.11%
Plurality		21	0.69%	-8.38%
Total votes		3,023	100.0%	-36.93%
Republican hold				

Wisconsin State Assembly
Preceded by Andrew S. Douglas	Member of the Wisconsin State Assembly from the Green County district January 2, 1905 – January 4, 1909	Succeeded by A. B. Comstock
Political offices
Preceded by John Lemmel	Clerk of Green County, Wisconsin; January 1, 1893 – January 1, 1899	Succeeded by James W. Lyman
