= John Edwin Holmes =

19th century American lawyer, minister, and politician

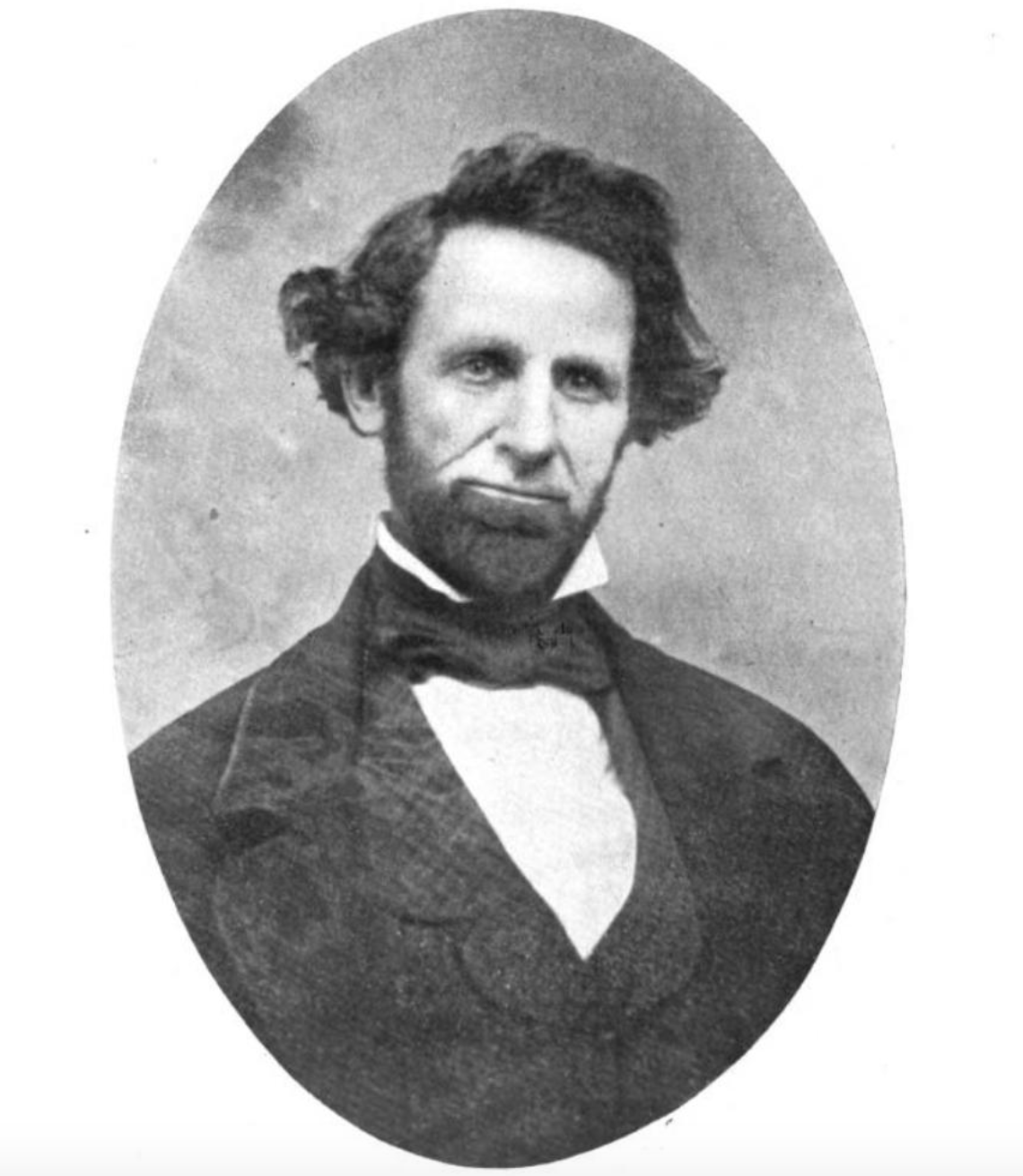

1st Lieutenant Governor of Wisconsin
- In office June 7, 1848 – January 7, 1850
- Governor: Nelson Dewey
- Preceded by: Position Established
- Succeeded by: Samuel W. Beall

Member of the Wisconsin State Assembly from the Jefferson 2nd district
- In office January 1, 1853 – January 1, 1854
- Preceded by: A. H. Van Norstrand
- Succeeded by: David L. Morrison

Member of the Council of the Wisconsin Territory for Dodge and Jefferson counties
- In office January 4, 1847 – March 13, 1848
- Preceded by: John Catlin for Dane, Dodge, Green, Jefferson, and Sauk
- Succeeded by: Position Abolished

Personal details
- Born: John Edwin Holmes; December 28, 1807 Glastonbury, Connecticut, U.S.
- Died: May 8, 1863 (aged 53) Annapolis, Maryland, U.S.
- Resting place: Greenwood Cemetery; Jefferson, Wisconsin
- Party: Republican; Democratic (before 1856)
- Spouses: Ruth A. Hawley; (m. 1836–1863)
- Children: Edwin F. Holmes; three other sons
- Parents: Solomon Holmes (father); Ann McKee Holmes (mother)

Military service
- Allegiance: United States
- Branch/service: United States Army; Union Army
- Years of service: 1862–1863
- Rank: Quartermaster
- Unit: 22nd Reg. Wis. Vol. Infantry
- Battles/wars: American Civil War: Battle of Brentwood

John Edwin Holmes (December 28, 1809 – May 8, 1863) was an American lawyer, minister, and politician. He was the 1st Lieutenant Governor of Wisconsin and a Union Army officer in the American Civil War. He was captured by Confederate forces during the Battle of Brentwood and died of disease.

== Early life ==
Born in Glastonbury, Connecticut, Holmes moved with his parents to New York when he was four; and both parents died when he was eight. He then lived with his grandfather until he was twelve. He moved to Hamilton, in Madison County, and studied while working to support himself, and was able to teach in a common school. He attended an academy and prepared himself and was ordained a Universalist minister in 1833. He preached for a short time in Michigan and Ohio. He soon began to study law in Illinois and was admitted to the bar in Illinois. He joined the Democratic Party and moved to the Wisconsin Territory, settling in what is now Jefferson, Wisconsin, to practice law.

== Career ==
Holmes served on the Council of the Wisconsin Territory—the upper house of the territorial legislature—representing Jefferson and Dodge Counties through the final years before statehood. When Wisconsin became a State, in 1848, Mr. Holmes was chosen as the first lieutenant governor of the state, and served in that capacity for 1848 and 1849 under governor Nelson Dewey. He was not a candidate for re-election in 1849. But in 1852 he was elected to the Wisconsin State Assembly for the 1853 session, surviving an election challenge from Benjamin F. Adams.

== Civil War ==
After the outbreak of the Civil War, Holmes volunteered for service with the Union Army and, in August 1862, he became a Quartermaster for the 22nd Wisconsin Volunteer Infantry Regiment. He remained with the regiment until March 25, 1863, when he was taken prisoner along with many of his regiment at the Battle of Brentwood. He was sent to Libby Prison where he became seriously ill. He was returned to the Union in a prisoner exchange on May 5, 1863.

== Death ==
Two days after his release, Holmes was sent to Annapolis, Maryland, where he died the next day on May 8, 1863. His remains were brought to Jefferson, and were interred with Masonic rites at Greenwood Cemetery Jefferson, Jefferson County, Wisconsin.

== Family life ==
Son of Solomon and Ann (McKee) Holmes, Holmes married Miss Ruth A. Hawley, of Milan, Ohio, in 1836 and they had four sons.

Party political offices
New office	Democratic nominee for Lieutenant Governor of Wisconsin; 1849	Succeeded by Samuel W. Beall
Wisconsin State Assembly
Preceded by A. H. Van Norstrand	Member of the Wisconsin State Assembly from the Jefferson 2nd district January 1, 1853 – January 1, 1854	Succeeded by David L. Morrison
Political offices
New office	Lieutenant Governor of Wisconsin; 1848–1850	Succeeded by Samuel Beall
