= James S. Alban =

Union Army Colonel killed at the Battle of Shiloh, Member of the Wisconsin Senate

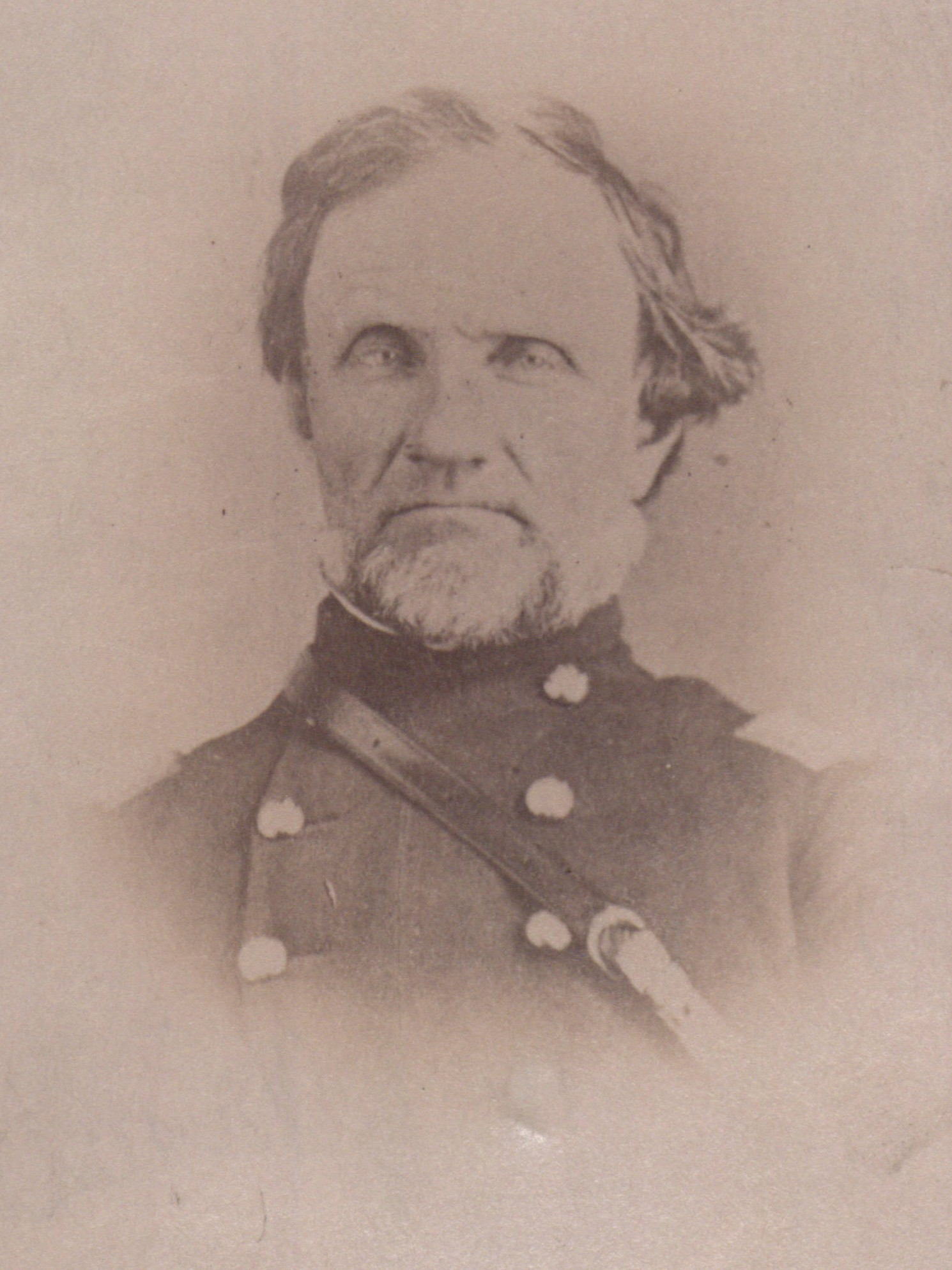

Member of the Wisconsin Senate from the 2nd district
- In office January 5, 1852 – January 2, 1854
- Preceded by: George DeGraw Moore
- Succeeded by: Joseph F. Loy

District Attorney of Portage County, Wisconsin
- In office January 1, 1847 – January 1, 1848
- Preceded by: Position Established

Personal details
- Born: James Shane Alban; October 30, 1809 Jefferson County, Ohio
- Died: April 7, 1862 (aged 52) Battle of Shiloh; Hardin County, Tennessee
- Resting place: Plover Cemetery; Plover, Wisconsin
- Party: Whig
- Spouses: Amanda Harris; (m. 1833; died 1843); Clarissa W. Danforth; (m. 1844; died 1867)
- Children: with Amanda Harris; Lucinda (Hanchett) (Raymond)^{(b. 1834; died 1928)}; Stephen Harris Alban^{(b. c.1836; died 1914)}; Elizabeth S. (Brown)^{(b. c.1838)}; Sybil C. (Halladay)^{(b. c.1841)}; Amanda Alban^{(b. c.1843)}; with Clarissa Danforth; George Alban^{(died young)}; William R. Alban^{(b. c.1851)}; Caroline (Johnson)^{(b. c.1855)}; James Alban, Jr.^{(b. c.1857)}; Cora (Wylie)^{(b. c.1859)}
- Parents: William Alban (father); Elizabeth Shane (mother)
- Relatives: William R. Alban (brother)
- Profession: lawyer

Military service
- Allegiance: United States
- Branch/service: United States Army; Union Army
- Years of service: 1861–1862
- Rank: Colonel, USV
- Commands: 18th Reg. Wis. Vol. Infantry
- Battles/wars: American Civil War: Battle of Shiloh (KIA)

James Shane Alban (October 30, 1809 – April 7, 1862) was an American lawyer, Wisconsin pioneer, and Union Army colonel in the American Civil War. He died leading the 18th Wisconsin Infantry Regiment at the Battle of Shiloh. He also served as a member of the Wisconsin State Senate.

== Early life and education ==
Alban was born in Jefferson County, Ohio, to William and Elizabeth Alban. At age 8, his family moved to Stark County, Ohio, where he worked in farming, received a common education, and read law.

== Wisconsin pioneer ==
Alban married Amanda Harris in 1833 and they had five children together. Alban moved west with his young family in 1836, first stopping near Chicago, then moving into the Wisconsin Territory, in 1838. They traveled through Dane County and stopped near the site of what is now Sauk City to watch the negotiations between the United States and the Winnebago which would ultimately lead to the Winnebago ceding all land east of the Mississippi. Before the treaty went into effect, Alban took his family across the frozen Wisconsin River into what was still Winnebago territory. On December 20, 1838, the Alban family settled in the south end of the Sauk Prairie. The Albans are considered to be the first "white" family to settle in the county, and their daughter, Elizabeth, was said to be the first "white" child born in the county.

In 1839, while exploring north of his family settlement, Alban discovered Devil's Lake and reported its location to explorer Eben Peck. In the winter of 1839–1840, Alban, along with the handful of other settlers in the area, petitioned the Territorial Legislature to establish their region as a new county—Sauk.

His wife, Amanda, died in 1843, and Alban brought his children back to Ohio. In 1844, however, he married his second wife, Clarissa Danforth, and moved back to the Wisconsin Territory. This time, he settled at Plover, in Portage County, where he opened the first law office in the area. In 1847, he became Portage County's first District Attorney, he also served as Treasurer of the county. In 1848 he entered a partnership with Luther Hanchett, who would also marry his eldest daughter, Lucinda.

== Wisconsin politics ==
In 1851, Alban was elected to the Wisconsin State Senate on the Whig Party ticket, representing the vast northeastern corner of the state in the 1852 and 1853 sessions. In the Senate, Alban sat on the Committee for Incorporations and the Committee for Education, School, and University Lands. On the latter, Alban played an important role in the establishment of Milwaukee University and Racine College.

In April 1854, Alban ran for Wisconsin Circuit Court Judge against assemblymember George W. Cate, in the 7th judicial circuit, but was defeated. Alban continued his law practice and remained involved in politics. In 1856, he started publishing his own newspaper, the Plover Herald, which he used to advocate for emancipation.

== Civil War ==
After the outbreak of the American Civil War, Alban received a commission as colonel of the 18th Wisconsin Infantry Regiment. He began raising volunteers in late 1861 and, in February 1862, the regiment was organized and trained at Camp Trowbridge, in Milwaukee. The regiment mustered into service March 15, 1862, and proceeded to Tennessee, where they joined general Ulysses S. Grant's Army of the Tennessee.

They arrived at Pittsburg Landing, Tennessee, on April 5 and were immediately deployed to the left flank of the Union line, not yet even organized into a brigade. They camped that night, and in the early morning found themselves under attack from Confederate forces on two sides. The regiment eventually was able to find a defensive position with similarly disorganized volunteer regiments from Ohio and Illinois, and were able to repel subsequent Confederate attacks. But at this place, after seven hours of battle, Colonel Alban was shot off his horse by a sharp shooter. He died the next day, one of 23,746 casualties at the Battle of Shiloh. His second in command, Lt. Colonel Samuel Beall was also wounded in the battle, and the next in command, Major Josiah W. Crane, was killed as well.

He was ultimately succeeded in his command by future U.S. Representative Gabriel Bouck, who led the regiment through the next two years of the war.

== Legacy ==
Colonel Alban's body was returned to Plover and he was interred at Plover Cemetery.

Colonel Alban was survived by nine of his ten children. His brother, William, had followed him to Wisconsin and also set down roots in Plover.

The town and community of Alban, Wisconsin, in Portage County, is named for him.

Military offices
| Regiment established | Command of the 18th Wisconsin Infantry Regiment; March 15, 1862 – April 7, 1862 | Succeeded by Gabriel Bouck |
Wisconsin Senate
| Preceded by George DeGraw Moore | Member of the Wisconsin Senate from the 2nd district January 5, 1852 – January 2, 1854 | Succeeded by Joseph F. Loy |
