= Timothy Burns (Wisconsin politician) =

19th century American politician

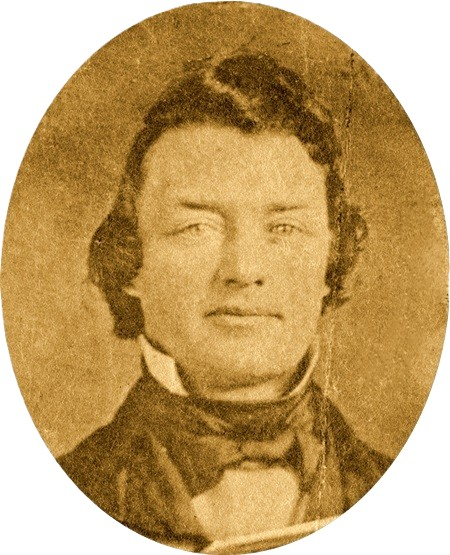

3rd Lieutenant Governor of Wisconsin
- In office January 5, 1852 – September 21, 1853
- Governor: Leonard Farwell
- Preceded by: Samuel W. Beall
- Succeeded by: James T. Lewis

Member of the Wisconsin State Assembly from the Iowa–Richland 2nd district
- In office January 1, 1849 – January 7, 1850
- Preceded by: Abner Nichols
- Succeeded by: Thomas M. Fullerton

Speaker of the House of Representatives of the Wisconsin Territory
- In office February 7, 1848 – March 13, 1848
- Preceded by: Isaac P. Walker
- Succeeded by: Ninian E. Whiteside

Member of the House of Representatives of the Wisconsin Territory for Iowa, Lafayette, & Richland counties
- In office January 4, 1847 – May 29, 1848 Serving with James D. Jenkins (1847), Thomas Chilton (1847), M. M. Cothren (1847–1848), & Charles Pole (1847–1848)
- Preceded by: Robert C. Hoard, Henry M. Billings, & Charles Pole
- Succeeded by: Position abolished

Personal details
- Born: May 31, 1820 Dublin, Ireland, UK
- Died: September 21, 1853 (aged 33) La Crosse, Wisconsin, US
- Resting place: Oak Grove Cemetery, La Crosse, Wisconsin
- Party: Democratic
- Spouse: Cordelia Esperson Burns
- Children: Robert W. Burns
- Profession: Miner; Judge; Railroad Man; Politician

Timothy Burns (May 31, 1820 – September 21, 1853) was an Irish American immigrant, Democratic politician, and Wisconsin pioneer. He was the third Lieutenant Governor of Wisconsin, serving from 1852 until his death in 1853; he was the first Wisconsin statewide officeholder to die while in office. He had previously served one term in the Wisconsin State Assembly, representing the Iowa–Richland 2nd district in 1849. Before Wisconsin statehood, he served in the last term of the Wisconsin Territory House of Representatives, and was speaker of the final session of that body.

== Early life ==
Born in Dublin, Ireland, on May 31, 1820, Burns came to New York with his family as an infant. In the fall of 1837 as a young man, he settled in Iowa County in Wisconsin Territory, where he engaged in lead mining.

== Career ==
In 1844 Burns was elected sheriff of Iowa County. Elected in 1846, he served in the Wisconsin territorial House of Representatives in 1847–1848 and became Assembly Speaker. He visited La Crosse in 1847. Later, in 1849 he served in the Wisconsin State Assembly. In 1850, he moved to La Crosse, Wisconsin, and took a position on the State Board of Public Works. He was the chairman of the first La Crosse Town Board, chairman of the first La Crosse County Board and the first La Crosse county judge, while also engaging in the railroad industry.

In 1851, he was elected as a Democrat and became the Wisconsin's third Lieutenant Governor under the State's second Governor, Leonard Farwell.

== Death and legacy ==
While visiting his brother-in-law in Lafayette County, Burns became ill of bilious fever but recovered enough to travel home, and died of a relapse in La Crosse on September 21, 1853. He is interred at Oak Grove Cemetery, La Crosse, Wisconsin.

Burns Park, in downtown La Crosse, and the town and community of Burns were named after him.

== Electoral history ==
Wisconsin Lieutenant Gubernatorial Election, 1851
Party	Candidate	Votes	%	±%
General Election, November 4, 1851
Democratic	Timothy Burns	24,605	55.44%	+2.85%
Whig	James Hughes	16,793	37.84%	+3.25%
Free Soil	Benjamin B. Spaulding	2,918	6.57%	−6.24%
	Scattering	65	0.15%	
Plurality		7,812	17.60%	-3.45%
Total votes		44,381	100.0%	+42.72%
Democratic hold				

Party political offices
Preceded by Samuel Beall	Democratic nominee for Lieutenant Governor of Wisconsin; 1851	Succeeded by James T. Lewis
Wisconsin State Assembly
Preceded by Abner Nichols	Member of the Wisconsin State Assembly from the Iowa–Richland 2nd district January 1, 1849 – January 7, 1850	Succeeded by Thomas M. Fullerton
Political offices
Preceded by Samuel Beall	Lieutenant Governor of Wisconsin; January 5, 1852 – September 21, 1853	Succeeded by James T. Lewis
