= Albany, Wisconsin =

- Village
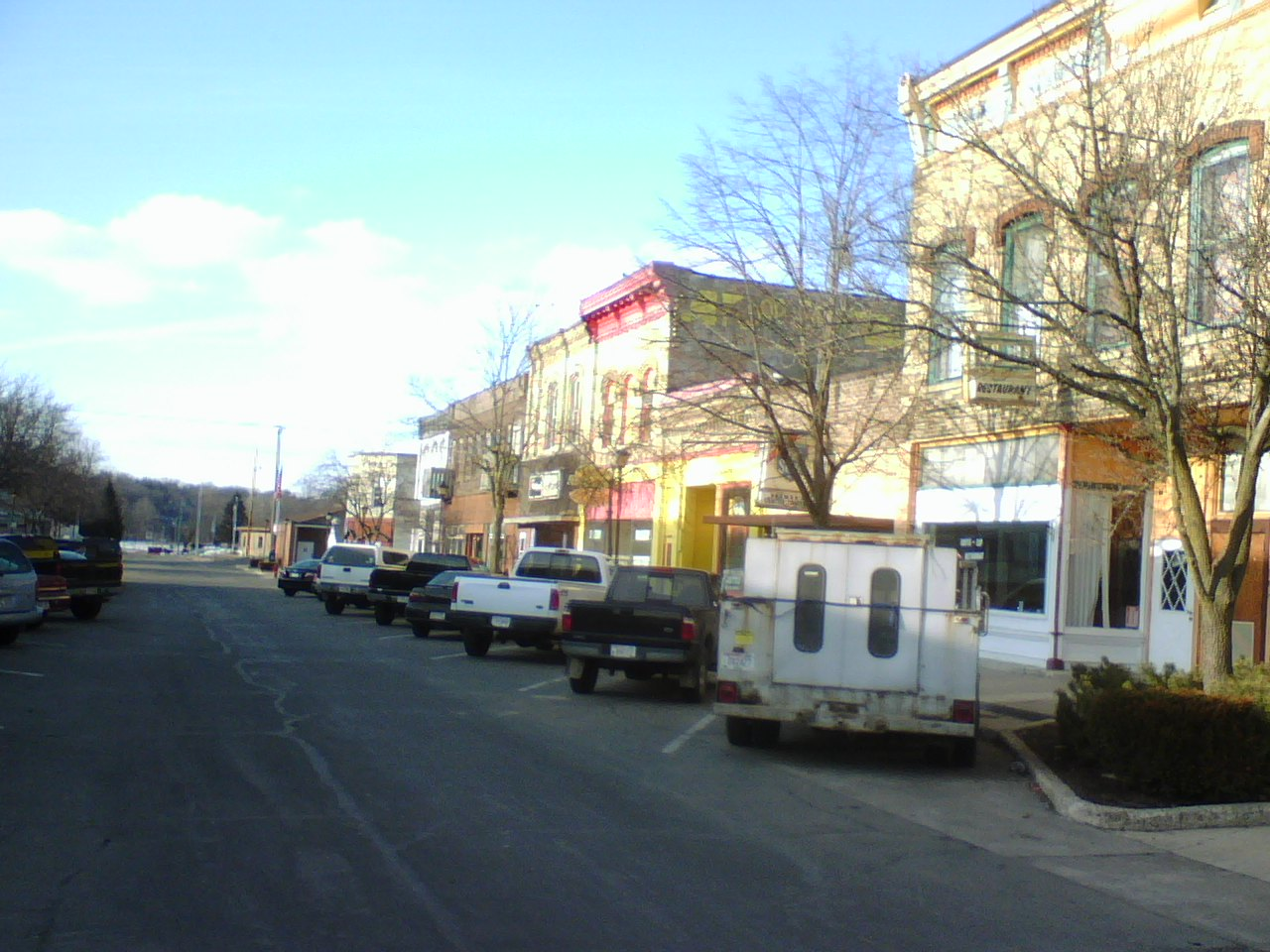
- Downtown: North Water Street
- Nickname: Pearl of the Sugar River
- Location of Albany in Green County, Wisconsin.
- Coordinates: 42°42′20″N 89°26′9″W
- Country: United States
- State: Wisconsin
- County: Green

Area
  - Total: 1.29 sq mi (3.35 km^{2})
  - Land: 1.27 sq mi (3.29 km^{2})
  - Water: 0.023 sq mi (0.06 km^{2})

Population (2020)
  - Total: 1,096
  - Density: 781.6/sq mi (301.78/km^{2})
- Time zone: UTC-6 (Central (CST))
  - Summer (DST): UTC-5 (CDT)
- Postal code: 53502
- Area code: 608
- FIPS code: 55-00750
- Website: Village of Albany

Albany is a village in Green County, Wisconsin, United States. The population was 1,096 at the 2020 census. The village is located within the Town of Albany.

== Geography ==
According to the United States Census Bureau, the village has a total area of 1.31 square miles (3.39 km^{2}), of which 1.28 square miles (3.32 km^{2}) is land and 0.03 square miles (0.08 km^{2}) is water.

== Demographics ==
Historical population
Census	Pop.	Note	%±
1880	267		—
1890	698		161.4%
1900	797		14.2%
1910	669		−16.1%
1920	741		10.8%
1930	728		−1.8%
1940	741		1.8%
1950	839		13.2%
1960	892		6.3%
1970	875		−1.9%
1980	1,051		20.1%
1990	1,140		8.5%
2000	1,191		4.5%
2010	1,018		−14.5%
2020	1,096		7.7%
U.S. Decennial Census

As of 2000 the median income for a household in the village was $44,594, and the median income for a family was $46,071. Males had a median income of $30,966 versus $21,061 for females. The per capita income for the village was $19,186. About 0.3% of families and 3.5% of the population were below the poverty line, including none of those under age 18 and 7.4% of those age 65 or over.

=== 2010 census ===
As of the census of 2010, there were 1,018 people, 434 households, and 274 families residing in the village. The population density was 795.3 inhabitants per square mile (307.1/km^{2}). There were 493 housing units at an average density of 385.2 per square mile (148.7/km^{2}). The racial makeup of the village was 96.5% White, 0.5% African American, 0.7% Asian, 1.1% from other races, and 1.3% from two or more races. Hispanic or Latino of any race were 2.4% of the population.

There were 434 households, of which 31.3% had children under the age of 18 living with them, 46.3% were married couples living together, 10.6% had a female householder with no husband present, 6.2% had a male householder with no wife present, and 36.9% were non-families. 28.8% of all households were made up of individuals, and 9.9% had someone living alone who was 65 years of age or older. The average household size was 2.35 and the average family size was 2.87.

The median age in the village was 39.8 years. 22.6% of residents were under the age of 18; 7.3% were between the ages of 18 and 24; 28% were from 25 to 44; 30.5% were from 45 to 64; and 11.9% were 65 years of age or older. The gender makeup of the village was 48.3% male and 51.7% female.

== Notable people ==
- John Litel, actor
