= Lieutenant Governor of Wisconsin =

Constitutional officer of Wisconsin

- Privy Seal of the State of Wisconsin

- State flag

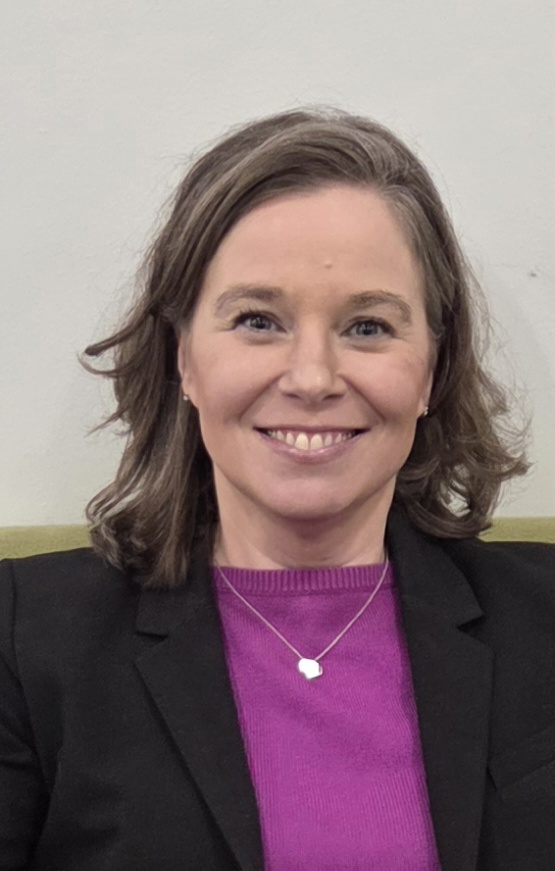
- Incumbent; Sara Rodriguez since January 3, 2023
- Government of Wisconsin
- Style: Mr. or Madam Lieutenant Governor (informal); The Honorable (formal)
- Term length: Four years, no term limit
- Constituting instrument: Wisconsin Constitution, Article V
- Inaugural holder: John Edwin Holmes
- Formation: June 7, 1848 (178 years ago)
- Succession: First
- Salary: $80,684
- Website: Official page

The lieutenant governor of Wisconsin is the first person in the line of succession of Wisconsin's executive branch, thus serving as governor in the event of the death, resignation, removal, impeachment, absence from the state, or incapacity due to illness of the governor of Wisconsin. Forty-one individuals have held the office of lieutenant governor since Wisconsin's admission to the Union in 1848, two of whom—Warren Knowles and Jack Olson—have served for non-consecutive terms. The first lieutenant governor was John Holmes, who took office on June 7, 1848. The current lieutenant governor is Sara Rodriguez, who took office on January 3, 2023.

== Succession to the governorship ==
Until 1979, the Wisconsin Constitution merely stated that in the event of the governor's death, resignation, removal from office, impeachment, absence from the state or incapacity due to illness, "the powers and duties of the office [of Governor of Wisconsin] shall devolve upon the lieutenant governor". Lieutenant governors who served as governor during this period are referred to as "acting governors". In 1979, the constitution was amended to make this more specific: in the event of the governor's death, resignation, or removal from office, the lieutenant governor becomes governor; in the event of the governor's impeachment, absence, or incapacity, the lieutenant governor becomes acting governor until the governor is again able to serve.

== Lieutenant gubernatorial elections and term of office ==
Under the original terms of the state constitution, the lieutenant governor was elected for a two-year term on a separate ticket from the governor; because of this, the governor and lieutenant governor of Wisconsin have not always been of the same party. After a 1967 amendment, however, the two have been nominated, and voted upon, as a single ticket. The 1967 amendment also increased the terms of both the governor and lieutenant governor to four years. There is no limit to the number of terms a lieutenant governor may hold.

=== Vacancy ===
The original constitution made no provision for a vacancy in the office of the lieutenant governor; in the event of the lieutenant governor's death, resignation, or service as acting governor, the lieutenant governorship usually remained vacant until the end of the term. In 1938, following the resignation of lieutenant governor Henry Gunderson, Governor Philip La Follette appointed Herman Ekern lieutenant governor to fill the vacancy. This appointment was challenged in court, and ruled valid in the case State ex rel. Martin v. Ekern. In 1979 the constitution was amended to explicitly allow this: in the event of a vacancy in the office of the lieutenant governor, the governor nominates a candidate who becomes lieutenant governor for the remainder of the term upon his approval by the Wisconsin Assembly and Wisconsin State Senate.

=== Removal ===
A lieutenant governor may be removed from office through an impeachment trial or a recall. They may also choose to resign from office. No lieutenant governor has ever been impeached; two have resigned. Rebecca Kleefisch is the only lieutenant governor in the history of any state to face recall election in 2012. She faced Democrat Mahlon Mitchell and won the election with a six percent majority.

== Lieutenant gubernatorial powers ==
If the governor appoints the lieutenant governor to a statutory board, committee or commission on which he is entitled membership as his representative, the lieutenant governor has all the authority in that position that would be granted the governor.

Originally, the lieutenant governor also presided over the state senate and cast a vote in the event of a tie; however, after an amendment to the Wisconsin Constitution in 1979, the senate chooses a senator to be presiding officer.

== List of lieutenant governors ==
Number of lieutenant governors of Wisconsin by party affiliation
Party	Lt. governors
Republican	29
Democratic	16
Progressive	2

From 1836, until 1848, what is now Wisconsin was part of Wisconsin Territory. There was no position of "Territorial Lieutenant Governor"; however, the territory had a Secretary who was similar in that one of his functions was to assume the powers and duties of the territorial governor if he were unable to carry them out. For the secretaries from the territorial period, see the List of secretaries of Wisconsin Territory.

Wisconsin was admitted to the Union on May 29, 1848. Since then, it has had 41 lieutenant governors, two of whom have served non-consecutive terms.

Parties

Democratic (16) Whig (0) Republican (27) Progressive (2)

#	Image	Lt. Governor	Party	Took office	Left office (Note: When there is no evidence to the contrary, it is assumed that lieutenant governors left office the same day their successors were sworn in.)	Governor	Term(s) (Note: The fractional terms of some lieutenant governors are not to be understood absolutely literally; rather, they are meant to show single terms during which multiple lieutenant governors served, due to resignations, deaths, and delayed inaugurations.)
1		John E. Holmes	Democratic	June 7, 1848	January 7, 1850	Nelson Dewey	1
2		Samuel W. Beall	Democratic	January 7, 1850	January 5, 1852	Nelson Dewey	1
3		Timothy Burns	Democratic	January 5, 1852	September 21, 1853	Leonard Farwell	1/2 (Note: Died in office.)
vacant				September 21, 1853	January 2, 1854	Leonard Farwell	1/2 (Note: Vacant due to death of lieutenant governor.)
4		James T. Lewis	Democratic	January 2, 1854	January 7, 1856	William Barstow	1
5		Arthur MacArthur Sr.	Democratic	January 7, 1856	March 21, 1856	William Barstow	1/3 (Note: MacArthur was elected lieutenant governor in the 1855 election; initially Barstow was declared the winner of the gubernatorial election, but when he resigned amid claims that he had won by fraudulent means, MacArthur began to act as governor. After five days, the Wisconsin Supreme Court ruled that Bartow's opponent, Bashford, was the legitimate governor, at which point MacArthur returned to serving as lieutenant governor.)
5		MacArthur acting as governor (Note: Periods during which the lieutenant governor acted as governor are listed only if they would have caused the lieutenant governor to become governor had the 1979 amendment existed during that time; that is, those resulting from the death, resignation, or removal of the governor. Those resulting from the governor's temporary absence from the state, impeachment, or his inability to serve due to illness are not listed.)		March 21, 1856	March 25, 1856	Arthur MacArthur Sr.	1/3 (Note: Note that when lieutenant governors are acting as governors, they technically continue to be lieutenant governors. However, in order to avoid confusion, they are here listed as governors only. Some sources will include these periods in the lieutenant governors' terms of office.)
5		Arthur MacArthur Sr.	Democratic	March 25, 1856	January 4, 1858	Coles Bashford	1/3
6		Erasmus D. Campbell	Democratic	January 4, 1858	January 2, 1860	Alexander Randall	1
7		Butler G. Noble	Republican	January 2, 1860	January 6, 1862	Alexander Randall	1
8		Edward Salomon	Republican	January 6, 1862	April 19, 1862	Louis Harvey	1/2
8		Salomon acting as governor		April 19, 1862	January 4, 1864	Edward Salomon	1/2
vacant				January 4, 1864	by January 13, 1864 (Note: Governor Lewis was sworn in on January 4, but Lieutenant Governor Spooner was not. Contemporary newspaper articles dated January 13 refer to him as "lieutenant governor", suggesting that he was sworn in before that day. However, the Wisconsin Blue Books variously give his date of inauguration as January 1, January 14, or list only the year, 1864.)	James Lewis	1/2
9		Wyman Spooner	Republican	by January 13, 1864	January 3, 1870	James Lewis	21/2
9		Wyman Spooner	Republican	by January 13, 1864	January 3, 1870	Lucius Fairchild	21/2
10		Thaddeus C. Pound	Republican	January 3, 1870	January 1, 1872	Lucius Fairchild	1
11		Milton H. Pettit	Republican	January 1, 1872	March 23, 1873	Cadwallader Washburn	1/2
vacant				March 23, 1873	January 5, 1874	Cadwallader Washburn	1/2
12		Charles D. Parker	Democratic	January 5, 1874	January 7, 1878	William Taylor	2
12		Charles D. Parker	Democratic	January 5, 1874	January 7, 1878	Harrison Ludington	2
13		James M. Bingham	Republican	January 7, 1878	January 2, 1882	William Smith	2
14		Sam S. Fifield	Republican	January 2, 1882	January 3, 1887	Jeremiah Rusk	2 (Note: During Fifield's first term, the Wisconsin Constitution was amended to say that all elections of state and county officers would henceforth take place in even-numbered years. By the provisions of the amendment, the terms of all officials who would have left office in 1884, including Fifield, were extended by one year.)
15		George W. Ryland	Republican	January 3, 1887	January 5, 1891	Jeremiah Rusk	2
15		George W. Ryland	Republican	January 3, 1887	January 5, 1891	William Hoard	2
16		Charles Jonas	Democratic	January 5, 1891	April 4, 1894	George Peck	11/2 (Note: Resigned from office.)
vacant				April 4, 1894	January 7, 1895	George Peck	1/2 (Note: Vacant due to resignation of lieutenant governor.)
17		Emil Baensch	Republican	January 7, 1895 (Note: Governor Upham was sworn in on January 7. Contemporary newspaper accounts indicate that Lieutenant Governor Baensch was sworn in on the same day; however, the Wisconsin Blue Book states that he was inaugurated on January 8.)	January 2, 1899	William Upham	2
17		Emil Baensch	Republican	January 7, 1895	January 2, 1899	Edward Scofield	2
18		Jesse Stone	Republican	January 2, 1899	May 11, 1902	Edward Scofield	11/2
18		Jesse Stone	Republican	January 2, 1899	May 11, 1902	Robert La Follette Sr.	11/2
vacant				May 11, 1902	January 5, 1903	Robert La Follette Sr.	1/2
19		James O. Davidson	Republican	January 5, 1903	January 1, 1906	Robert La Follette Sr.	11/2
19		Davidson acting as governor		January 1, 1906	January 7, 1907	James Davidson	1/2
20		William D. Connor	Republican	January 7, 1907	January 4, 1909	James Davidson	1
21		John Strange	Republican	January 4, 1909	January 2, 1911	James Davidson	1
22		Thomas Morris	Republican	January 2, 1911	January 4, 1915	Francis McGovern	2
23		Edward F. Dithmar	Republican	January 4, 1915	January 3, 1921	Emanuel Philipp	3
24		George F. Comings	Republican	January 3, 1921	January 5, 1925	John Blaine	2
25		Henry A. Huber	Republican	January 5, 1925	January 2, 1933	John Blaine	4
25		Henry A. Huber	Republican	January 5, 1925	January 2, 1933	Fred R. Zimmerman	4
25		Henry A. Huber	Republican	January 5, 1925	January 2, 1933	Walter Kohler Sr.	4
25		Henry A. Huber	Republican	January 5, 1925	January 2, 1933	Philip La Follette	4
26		Thomas J. O'Malley	Democratic	January 2, 1933	May 27, 1936	Albert Schmedeman	11/2
26		Thomas J. O'Malley	Democratic	January 2, 1933	May 27, 1936	Philip La Follette	11/2
vacant				May 27, 1936	January 4, 1937	Philip La Follette	1/2
27		Henry A. Gunderson	Progressive	January 4, 1937	October 16, 1937	Philip La Follette	1/3
vacant				October 16, 1937	May 16, 1938	Philip La Follette	1/3
28		Herman L. Ekern	Progressive	May 16, 1938	January 2, 1939	Philip La Follette	1/3 (Note: Appointed to fill vacancy.)
29		Walter S. Goodland	Republican	January 2, 1939	January 4, 1943	Julius Heil	2
29		Goodland acting as governor		January 4, 1943	January 1, 1945	Walter Goodland	1 (Note: Goodland was re-elected lieutenant governor in the 1942 election, and Orland Loomis was elected governor. When Loomis died before taking office, Goodland acted as governor for the entire term, per a ruling of the Wisconsin Supreme Court.)
30		Oscar Rennebohm	Republican	January 1, 1945	March 12, 1947	Walter Goodland	11/2
30		Rennebohm acting as governor		March 12, 1947	January 3, 1949	Oscar Rennebohm	1/2
31		George M. Smith	Republican	January 3, 1949	January 3, 1955	Oscar Rennebohm	3
31		George M. Smith	Republican	January 3, 1949	January 3, 1955	Walter Kohler Jr.	3
32		Warren P. Knowles	Republican	January 3, 1955	January 5, 1959	Walter Kohler Jr.	2
32		Warren P. Knowles	Republican	January 3, 1955	January 5, 1959	Vernon Thomson	2
33		Philleo Nash	Democratic	January 5, 1959	January 2, 1961	Gaylord Nelson	1
34		Warren P. Knowles	Republican	January 2, 1961	January 7, 1963	Gaylord Nelson	1
35		Jack B. Olson	Republican	January 7, 1963	January 4, 1965	John Reynolds	1
36		Patrick J. Lucey	Democratic	January 4, 1965	January 2, 1967	Warren Knowles	1
37		Jack B. Olson	Republican	January 2, 1967	January 4, 1971	Warren Knowles	2
38		Martin J. Schreiber	Democratic	January 4, 1971	July 6, 1977	Patrick Lucey	11/2 (Note: As per a 1967 amendment to the Wisconsin Constitution, Schreiber's first term was the first lieutenant gubernatorial term to last for 4 years.)
38		Schreiber acting as governor		July 6, 1977	January 3, 1979	Martin Schreiber	1/2
39		Russell A. Olson	Republican	January 3, 1979	January 3, 1983	Lee Dreyfus	1
40		James Flynn	Democratic	January 3, 1983	January 5, 1987	Anthony Earl	1
41		Scott McCallum	Republican	January 5, 1987	February 1, 2001	Tommy Thompson	31/3
vacant				February 1, 2001	May 9, 2001	Scott McCallum	1/3 (Note: Vacant due to lieutenant governor becoming governor for remainder of unexpired term.)
42		Margaret A. Farrow	Republican	May 9, 2001	January 6, 2003	Scott McCallum	1/3
43		Barbara Lawton	Democratic	January 6, 2003	January 3, 2011	Jim Doyle	2
44		Rebecca Kleefisch	Republican	January 3, 2011	January 7, 2019	Scott Walker	2
45		Mandela Barnes	Democratic	January 7, 2019	January 3, 2023	Tony Evers	1
46		Sara Rodriguez	Democratic	January 3, 2023	Incumbent	Tony Evers	1
