= Linwood, Wisconsin =

- Town
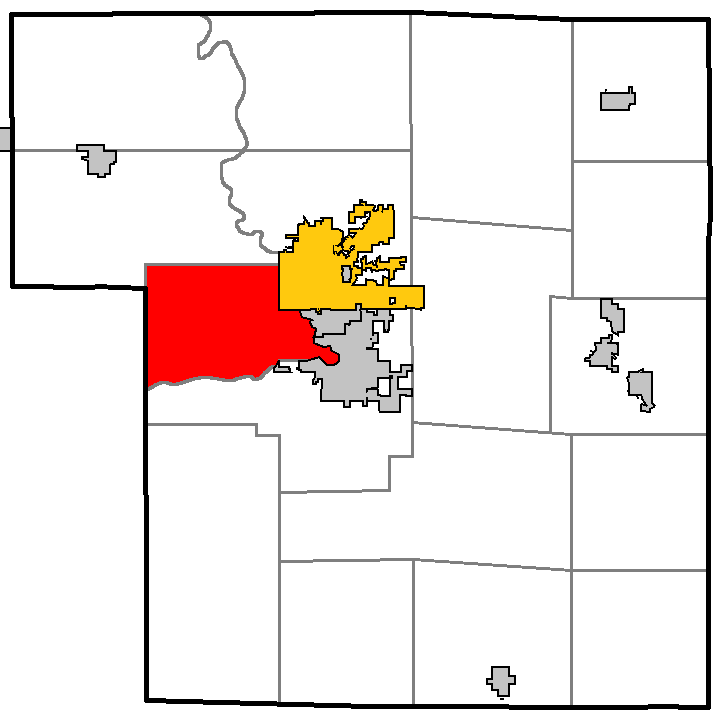
- Location of Linwood, Portage County

- Location of Portage County, Wisconsin
- Coordinates: 44°29′20″N 89°38′27″W
- Country: United States
- State: Wisconsin
- County: Portage

Area
  - Total: 33.8 sq mi (87.5 km^{2})
  - Land: 31.9 sq mi (82.7 km^{2})
  - Water: 1.9 sq mi (4.8 km^{2})
- Elevation: 1,112 ft (339 m)

Population (2020)
  - Total: 1,070
  - Density: 33.5/sq mi (12.9/km^{2})
- Time zone: UTC-6 (Central (CST))
  - Summer (DST): UTC-5 (CDT)
- Area codes: 715 & 534
- FIPS code: 55-44800
- GNIS feature ID: 1583577
- Website: https://www.townoflinwood.com/

Linwood is a town in Portage County, Wisconsin, United States. The population was 1,070 at the 2020 census.

== Geography ==
According to the United States Census Bureau, the town has a total area of 33.8 square miles (87.5 km^{2}), of which 31.9 square miles (82.7 km^{2}) is land and 1.8 square miles (4.8 km^{2}) (5.45%) is water.

== Demographics ==
At the 2000 census there were 1,111 people, 388 households, and 316 families in the town. The population density was 34.8 people per square mile (13.4/km^{2}). There were 411 housing units at an average density of 12.9 per square mile (5.0/km^{2}). The racial makeup of the town was 98.83% White, 0.09% African American, 0.18% Native American, 0.36% Asian, and 0.54% from two or more races. Hispanic or Latino of any race were 0.18%.

Of the 388 households 36.9% had children under the age of 18 living with them, 73.5% were married couples living together, 4.4% had a female householder with no husband present, and 18.3% were non-families. 15.2% of households were one person and 6.2% were one person aged 65 or older. The average household size was 2.86 and the average family size was 3.19.

The age distribution was 27.7% under the age of 18, 7.5% from 18 to 24, 29.8% from 25 to 44, 24.2% from 45 to 64, and 10.8% 65 or older. The median age was 37 years. For every 100 females, there were 103.1 males. For every 100 females age 18 and over, there were 105.4 males.

The median household income was $55,972 and the median family income was $59,625. Males had a median income of $39,250 versus $27,411 for females. The per capita income for the town was $21,073. About 3.8% of families and 3.0% of the population were below the poverty line, including 2.1% of those under age 18 and 9.1% of those age 65 or over.
