= Albany, Green County, Wisconsin =

Town of Albany
- Town
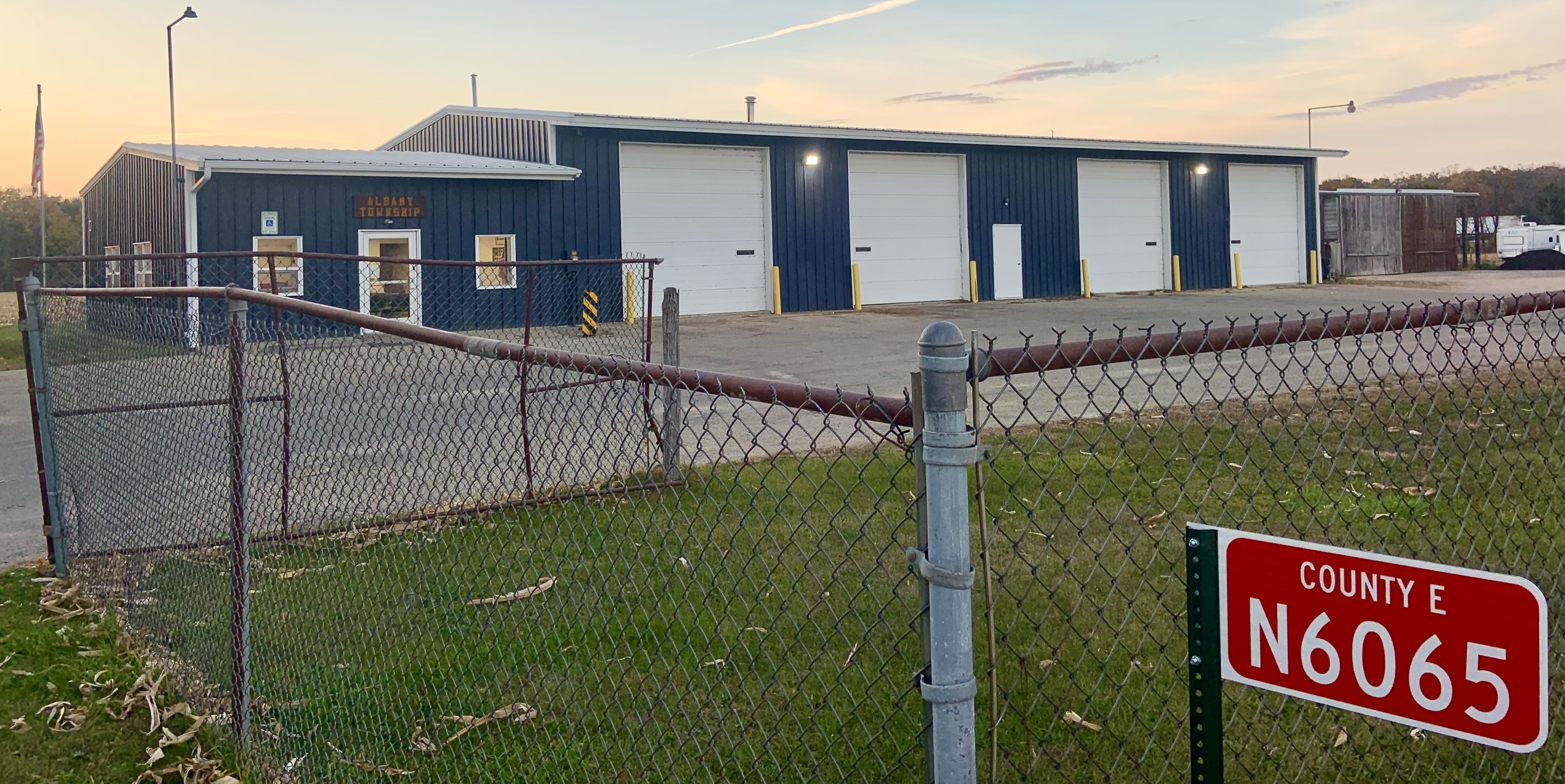
- Town hall

- Coordinates: 42°42′28″N 89°26′13″W
- Country: United States
- State: Wisconsin
- Region: Green County

Area
  - Total: 34.38 sq mi (89.0 km^{2})
  - Land: 34.28 sq mi (88.8 km^{2})
  - Water: 0.10 sq mi (0.26 km^{2})
- Elevation: 803 ft (245 m)

Population (2020)
  - Total: 1,189
  - Density: 34.68/sq mi (13.39/km^{2})
- Time zone: UTC-6 (CST)
  - Summer (DST): UTC-5 (CDT)
- Postal code: 53502
- Website: Town of Albany

The Town of Albany is a town located in Green County, Wisconsin, United States. The population was 1,189 at the 2020 Census. The Village of Albany is located within the town. The unincorporated community of Mineral Point is also located in the town.

== Geography ==
According to the United States Census Bureau, the town has a total area of 34.4 square miles (89.0 km^{2}), of which 34.3 square miles (88.8 km^{2}) is land and 0.1 square mile (0.3 km^{2}) (0.30%) is water.

== Demographics ==
As of the census of 2000, there were 775 people, 279 households, and 227 families residing in the town. The population density was 22.7 people per square mile (8.8/km^{2}). There were 303 housing units at an average density of 8.9 per square mile (3.4/km^{2}). The racial makeup of the town was 99.23% White, 0.13% Native American, 0.13% Asian, 0.26% from other races, and 0.26% from two or more races. 0.65% of the population were Hispanic or Latino of any race.

There were 279 households, out of which 35.8% had children under the age of 18 living with them, 73.1% were married couples living together, 3.9% had a female householder with no husband present, and 18.6% were non-families. 14.3% of all households were made up of individuals, and 5.7% had someone living alone who was 65 years of age or older. The average household size was 2.75 and the average family size was 3.04.

In the town, the population was spread out, with 26.3% under the age of 18, 6.5% from 18 to 24, 27.6% from 25 to 44, 29.5% from 45 to 64, and 10.1% who were 65 years of age or older. The median age was 38 years. For every 100 females, there were 116.5 males. For every 100 females age 18 and over, there were 109.9 males.

The median income for a household in the town was $52,083, and the median income for a family was $55,938. Males had a median income of $36,250 versus $23,333 for females. The per capita income for the town was $21,610. About 1.4% of families and 3.2% of the population were below the poverty line, including 1.6% of those under age 18 and 9.5% of those age 65 or over.
