= Marshal H. Pengra =

American politician

Marshal Hylon Pengra (January 18, 1819 – May 13, 1908) was a member of the Wisconsin State Assembly.

== Biography ==
Pengra was born Darien, New York in January 1819. Sources have differed on the exact date. On April 16, 1840, he married Elvira Lyon. They had six children. Pengra was a resident of Sylvester, Wisconsin, where he was a farm owner.

== Political career ==
Pengra served as a grand juror on the circuit court in 1862. He was elected to the Assembly in 1870 and 1871. Additionally, he was Chairman of the Town Board (similar to city council), Clerk and Assessor of Sylvester, a member of the County Board of Commissioners (similar to board of supervisors) of Green County, Wisconsin and a justice of the peace. He acted with the Republican Party after its creation.
