= Plover, Wisconsin =

Village in Portage County, Wisconsin, United States

Plover
- Village
- Location within Wisconsin Location within the United States
- Coordinates: 44°27′23″N 89°32′38″W
- Country: United States
- State: Wisconsin
- County: Portage
- Settled: 1844
- Incorporated: March 6, 1857
- Re-incorporated: September 28, 1971

Government
  - Village President: Gary Wolf
  - Body: Plover Village Board

Area
  - Village: 11.09 sq mi (28.73 km^{2})
  - Land: 10.61 sq mi (27.49 km^{2})
  - Water: 0.48 sq mi (1.24 km^{2})
- Elevation: 1,070 ft (326 m)

Population (2020)
  - Village: 13,519
  - Estimate (2026): 14,531
  - Rank: 1st in Portage County villages
  - Density: 1,366/sq mi (527.4/km^{2})
  - Metro: 70,377 (Stevens Point Micropolitan Area)
- Demonym: Ploverite
- Time zone: UTC−6 (CST)
  - Summer (DST): UTC−5 (CDT)
- ZIP code: 54467
- Area codes: 715/534
- FIPS code: 55-63550
- GNIS feature ID: 1571681

Plover is a village in Portage County, Wisconsin, United States. A central hub of the Stevens Point Micropolitan Statistical Area, it is the most populous village and the second-largest municipality in the county. With a population of 13,519 at the 2020 United States census and an estimated 14,531 in 2026, Plover has emerged as a major regional center for agriculture, food processing, and "Silent Sports" recreation.

Situated within the "Central Sands" region of Wisconsin, Plover features a unique topography defined by a flat glacial outwash plain that transitions into rugged terminal moraines to the east. The village is known for its high-density irrigated cropland, lush recreational trails, and its position along the Wisconsin River and Little Plover River.

== Demographics ==
Plover’s modern demographic profile is defined by a period of explosive growth following its 1971 re-incorporation. While the original 19th-century settlement was a small river-bound village, the late 20th century saw Plover transition from a rural town to the primary residential and commercial engine of southern Portage County. Between 1970 and 2020, the village population grew by 416%, far outstripping the growth rates of both Stevens Point and the State of Wisconsin.

=== Racial and ethnic composition ===
Historically a culturally homogenous settlement of European-descendant "Yankee" and Polish farmers, Plover has gradually diversified over the last 30 years as its economy shifted toward global food processing and retail.

Racial-ethnic composition	2020	2010	2000	1990
White (Non-Hispanic)	86.6%	92.8%	96.8%	98.2%
Asian	5.0%	3.8%	0.9%	0.6%
Hispanic or Latino (of any race)	5.1%	3.2%	1.3%	0.8%
Black or African American	1.3%	0.5%	0.4%	0.2%
Two or more races	4.9%	1.5%	0.9%	0.2%

The "Hmong Influx" (2000–2020): One of the most significant demographic shifts occurred at the turn of the century as Plover became a destination for Hmong American families. The Asian population grew from less than 1% in 1990 to 5% by 2020, contributing to the village's cultural fabric through local businesses and educational contributions.

Hispanic Growth: Reflecting national trends, the Hispanic and Latino community in Plover has increased nearly fivefold since 1990, driven largely by employment in the Central Sands' agricultural and food-manufacturing sectors.

=== Population history ===
Historical population
Census	Pop.	Note	%±
1880	412		—
1890	400		−2.9%
1900	345		−13.7%
1910	330		−4.3%
1920	280		−15.2%
1930	250		−10.7%
1940	220		−12.0%
1950	200		−9.1%
1960	250		25.0%
1970	2,618		947.2%
1980	5,310		102.8%
1990	8,176		54.0%
2000	10,520		28.7%
2010	12,123		15.2%
2020	13,519		11.5%
2026 (est.)	14,531	▲	7.5%
U.S. Decennial Census

=== 2020 census ===
As of the 2020 census, Plover had a population of 13,519. The median age was 38.2. 22.1% of residents were under the age of 18 and 17.3% of residents were 65 years of age or older. For every 100 females there were 96.6 males, and for every 100 females age 18 and over there were 93.5 males age 18 and over.

97.8% of residents lived in urban areas, while 2.2% lived in rural areas.

There were 5,717 households in Plover, of which 27.1% had children under the age of 18 living in them. Of all households, 48.5% were married-couple households, 17.1% were households with a male householder and no spouse or partner present, and 24.7% were households with a female householder and no spouse or partner present. About 29.0% of all households were made up of individuals and 11.1% had someone living alone who was 65 years of age or older.

There were 5,936 housing units, of which 3.7% were vacant. The homeowner vacancy rate was 0.5% and the rental vacancy rate was 3.6%.

=== Socioeconomics and Education ===
As of the 2020–2024 American Community Survey estimates, Plover maintains a significantly higher economic profile than its neighboring municipalities:

Household Income: The median household income of $88,042 is roughly 15% higher than the state average and 20% higher than the Stevens Point metropolitan average. This wealth is largely concentrated in the newer suburban developments on the village's east side.

Educational Attainment: Plover is a highly educated community; 42.2% of residents aged 25 and older hold a bachelor's degree or higher, compared to the Wisconsin state average of 33.4%. This is attributed to the village's role as a bedroom community for faculty and staff at the University of Wisconsin–Stevens Point.

Poverty: Despite rapid growth, Plover has maintained a low poverty rate of 9.2%, which is consistently lower than the national average.

== History ==
=== Early settlement and portage ===
The area was originally recognized as "Plover Portage," a name derived from the portage between the lower and upper Wisconsin River. In 1825, a treaty established the site as a boundary between the Chippewa and Winnebago tribes. In 1844, the site was selected as the first county seat of Portage County, with the village officially platted in 1845.

=== Incorporation and seat removal ===
Plover was incorporated as a village on March 6, 1857. However, after a heated legislative battle in 1868, the county seat was moved to Stevens Point. The loss of its administrative status led to the village's dissolution in 1870. The village underwent two further cycles of incorporation and dissolution in 1912 and 1931, primarily due to financial instability during the Great Depression. Its fourth and current incorporation was finalized on September 28, 1971. Since the 1970s, the village has expanded its land area significantly through nearly annual annexations of the surrounding Town of Plover.

== Geography ==
Plover sits atop a massive glacial outwash plain within the Central Sands region. This geography consists of deep sandy soils and a high water table, which supports intensive irrigation for agriculture. The village encompasses 11.09 square miles (28.7 km^{2}), of which 10.61 square miles (27.5 km^{2}) is land.

The village is bordered to the west by the Wisconsin River and is bisected by the Little Plover River, a rare spring-fed "Class I" trout stream noted for its hydrologic importance to regional groundwater levels. To the east, the landscape transitions into terminal moraines, creating hilly terrain that contrasts with the village's central plains.

=== Climate ===
Plover has a humid continental climate (Dfb), characterized by warm, wet summers and freezing, snowy winters. Over the course of the year, temperatures typically vary from 9°F to 82°F.

== Economy ==
Plover's economy is a powerhouse of the Wisconsin agricultural corridor, centered on vegetable processing and food manufacturing. The village serves as a major hub for large-scale operations utilizing the Central Sands' irrigated plains.

Key Employers: Major companies include Monogram Food Solutions, Basic American Foods, and specialized machining facilities.

Retail: Plover is a premier regional shopping destination, with annual retail sales exceeding $546 million, serving as the commercial core for southern Portage County.

Agri-Tourism: The recently developed Food + Farm Exploration Center provides a high-tech venue for agricultural education, reflecting the village's heritage.

== Geography and recreation ==
Plover is a gateway to one of the Midwest's most interconnected trail networks and diverse aquatic ecosystems.

=== Waterways ===
The Wisconsin River, forming the western boundary, is accessed via Galecke County Park for powerboating and fishing for walleye and bass. The Little Plover River is a premier destination for fly-fishing. At the village center, Lake Pacawa offers a 36-acre man-made recreational space featuring the Wisconsin Korean War Veterans Memorial.

=== Outdoor Activities ===
Trail Systems: Plover is a hub for the "Silent Sports" community, featuring the Green Circle Trail (27-mile loop) and the Tomorrow River State Trail (29-mile rail trail).

Parks: Standing Rocks County Park, located on glacial terminal moraines, offers over 10 miles of technical mountain biking trails and groomed cross-country ski trails.

== Government ==
Plover is governed by a Village President and a six-member Board of Trustees. The current Village President is Gary Wolf. Public safety is maintained by the Plover Police Department and the Plover Fire Department, which provides emergency services for both the village and the surrounding town.

== Education ==
Plover is served by the Stevens Point Area Public School District. The village is home to multiple elementary schools and the Boston School Forest, an environmental education center. Proximity to the University of Wisconsin–Stevens Point and Mid-State Technical College provides residents with advanced educational opportunities within the metropolitan area.

== Transportation ==
Transportation in Plover is dominated by the private automobile, though the village is a leader in regional bicycle infrastructure.

Highways: Plover is served by Interstate 39 and U.S. Route 51, which provide primary north-south access through Central Wisconsin. Wisconsin Highway 54 serves as the major east-west artery.

Cycling: The village is integrated into the regional trail system, aiming to double bicycle trip frequency through extensive bike lanes and paths.

Air: Residents are served by the Central Wisconsin Airport (CWA) in nearby Mosinee for commercial flights.

== Notable people ==
Plover has been the home of several prominent figures in sports, politics, and the military:

- Joe Pavelski: Professional ice hockey player in the NHL for teams including the San Jose Sharks and Dallas Stars; Olympic silver medalist.
- Dennis Hall: World champion Greco-Roman wrestler and Olympic silver medalist (1996).
- Clayton K. Slack: Recipient of the Medal of Honor for his actions during World War I.
- Alexander S. McDill: U.S. Representative from Wisconsin and medical superintendent.
- James S. Alban: Wisconsin State Senator and lawyer.
- Harley M. Jacklin: Wisconsin State Senator and farmer.
- Robert Lampman: Noted economist and advisor to Presidents Kennedy and Johnson.
- Walt Wilmot: Major League Baseball player for the Chicago Cubs; led the league in home runs in 1890.
- Luther Hanchett: State Senator who helped secure the original incorporation of Plover.

== See also ==
Wisconsin River
