= Spring Grove, Wisconsin =

- Town
- Location in Green County and the state of Wisconsin.
- Coordinates: 42°32′54″N 89°25′41″W
- Country: United States
- State: Wisconsin
- County: Green

Area
  - Total: 39.8 sq mi (103.1 km^{2})
  - Land: 39.8 sq mi (103.1 km^{2})
  - Water: 0 sq mi (0.0 km^{2})
- Elevation: 807 ft (246 m)

Population (2020)
  - Total: 919
  - Density: 23.1/sq mi (8.91/km^{2})
- Time zone: UTC-6 (Central (CST))
  - Summer (DST): UTC-5 (CDT)
- Area code: 608
- FIPS code: 55-76075
- GNIS feature ID: 1584198

Spring Grove is a town in Green County, Wisconsin, United States. The population was 919 at the 2020 census. The unincorporated community of Oakley and the ghost towns of Clarence and Tyrone are located in the town.

== Geography ==
According to the United States Census Bureau, the town has a total area of 39.8 square miles (103.1 km^{2}), all land.

Spring Grove is home of the Indian Half-Way Tree.

== Demographics ==
As of the census of 2000, there were 861 people, 290 households, and 243 families residing in the town. The population density was 21.6 people per square mile (8.3/km^{2}). There were 308 housing units at an average density of 7.7 per square mile (3.0/km^{2}). The racial makeup of the town was 96.63% White, 1.28% African American, 0.35% Native American, 0.23% Asian, 0.12% from other races, and 1.39% from two or more races. Hispanic or Latino of any race were 0.58% of the population.

There were 290 households, out of which 41.0% had children under the age of 18 living with them, 75.2% were married couples living together, 4.8% had a female householder with no husband present, and 15.9% were non-families. 11.4% of all households were made up of individuals, and 3.8% had someone living alone who was 65 years of age or older. The average household size was 2.97 and the average family size was 3.21.

In the town, the population was spread out, with 29.4% under the age of 18, 6.3% from 18 to 24, 30.7% from 25 to 44, 25.1% from 45 to 64, and 8.6% who were 65 years of age or older. The median age was 36 years. For every 100 females, there were 104.5 males. For every 100 females age 18 and over, there were 103.3 males.

The median income for a household in the town was $45,515, and the median income for a family was $45,893. Males had a median income of $30,769 versus $21,522 for females. The per capita income for the town was $16,975. About 4.7% of families and 4.7% of the population were below the poverty line, including 6.1% of those under age 18 and none of those age 65 or over.

== Notable people ==
- Albert M. Ten Eyck, academic
- Fred Ties, Wisconsin State Representative, lived in the town; Ties served as chairman of the Spring Grove Town Board
