= Willis Ludlow =

American politician

Willis Ludlow (January 24, 1854 – February 21, 1938) was an American farmer, banker, and politician.

Born in Monroe, Wisconsin, Ludlow went to Milton College and University of Wisconsin. Ludlow was a farmer and was involved with the First National Bank. Ludlow served as mayor of Monroe in 1904 and 1906 and was a Democrat. In 1911, Ludlow served in the Wisconsin State Assembly. Ludlow died in Monroe, Wisconsin from injuries from a fall at his home, leaving an estate worth $210,000.
