= Buena Vista Wildlife Area =

Wildlife refuge in Portage County, Wisconsin

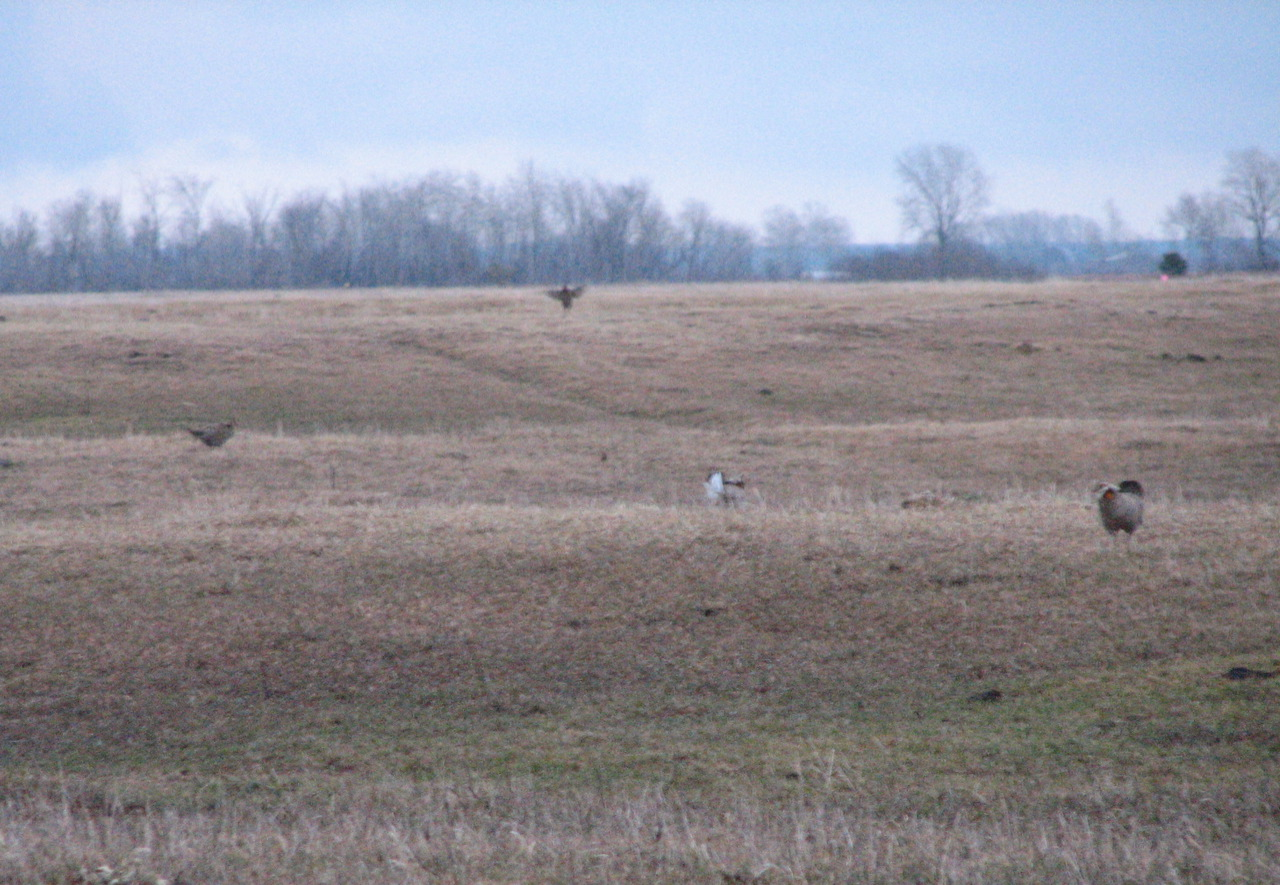
- Greater Prairie Chickens, Buena Vista Marsh, April 2008
- Interactive map of Buena Vista Wildlife Area
- Location: Portage County, Wisconsin
- Nearest town: Plover
- Coordinates: 44°20′14.6″N 89°38′49.3″W
- Area: 12,700 acres (5,100 ha)
- Designation: State wildlife area
- Governing body: Wisconsin Department of Natural Resources
- Website: Official website

Buena Vista Wildlife Area is a state wildlife area in Portage County, Wisconsin, United States.

== Geography ==
Buena Vista Wildlife Area is located on fragmented lands south of the Village of Plover and the Wisconsin River, east of Biron, Wisconsin Rapids, and Kellner, north of State Road 73, Adams County, and Waushara County, and west of Bancroft and Interstate 39 / U.S. Highway 51. The Buena Vista Marsh has various parcels of land in many sizes and shapes located in the towns of Grant, Buena Vista, Pine Grove, and Town of Plover.

== Management ==
The Buena Vista Marsh is managed in cooperation of the Wisconsin Department of Natural Resources, and the Wildlife Society at the University of Wisconsin–Stevens Point. The Buena Vista Marsh is often managed toward prairie chicken. The Buena Vista Marsh is noted by tourists in the spring who flock to see the mating rituals of the prairie chicken.
