= Heffron, Wisconsin =

- Unincorporated community
- Location within Wisconsin Location within the United States
- Coordinates: 44°14′37″N 89°18′22″W
- Country: United States
- State: Wisconsin
- Counties: Portage and Waushara
- Elevation: 1,171 ft (357 m)
- Time zone: UTC-6 (Central (CST))
  - Summer (DST): UTC-5 (CDT)
- Area codes: 715 & 534
- GNIS feature ID: 1577635

Heffron is an unincorporated community in the towns of Belmont and Rose in Portage and Waushara Counties, Wisconsin, United States.

== Geography ==
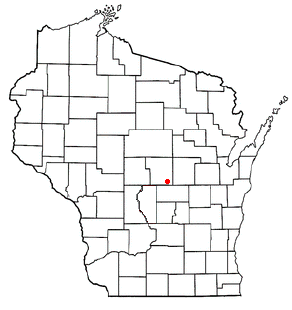
Location of Belmont, Wisconsin

Heffron is located in central Wisconsin, approximately five miles east of Almond and five miles south of Blaine at the intersection of Portage County Highway AA, and the town roads of Akron Avenue and Heffron Road. (Lat: 44° 14' 35.7", Lon: -89° 18' 24.3")

== History ==
Heffron was home to St. John the Baptist Catholic Church and a post office in its earlier days. The church still stands, but its congregation has since merged with several others into St. Maximilian Kolbe's Parish in Lanark. The community was named for John J. Heffron, a real estate developer from Stevens Point.

== Emmons Creek Fishery Area ==
Some consider Heffron and Dopp to be closely related, because of their proximity. Both are linked by the local snowmobile trail, and have an association with nearby Emmons Creek Fishery Area.
