= Sharon, Wisconsin (disambiguation) =

Sharon is the name of some places in the U.S. state of Wisconsin:

- Sharon, Portage County, Wisconsin, a town
- Sharon, Walworth County, Wisconsin, a town
- Sharon, Wisconsin, a village
