= James Miller (religious brother) =

American member of the Brothers of the Christian Schools (1944–1982)

Blessed Leo William Miller FSC
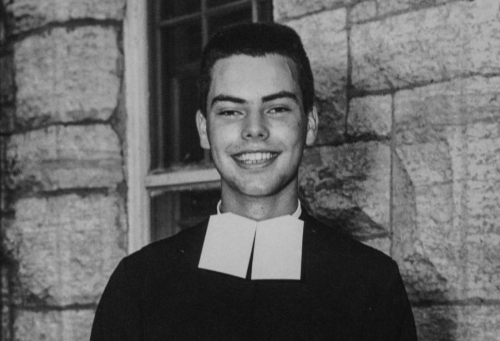
- Miller c. 1962

Martyr
- Born: James Alfred Miller; September 21, 1944; Stevens Point, Wisconsin, U.S.
- Died: February 13, 1982 (aged 37); Huehuetenango, Guatemala
- Honored in: Roman Catholic Church
- Beatified: December 7, 2019, Huehuetenango, Guatemala by Cardinal José Luis Lacunza Maestrojuán
- Feast: February 13
- Attributes: Wrench

James Alfred Miller, FSC (September 21, 1944 – February 13, 1982), also known as Brother Leo William or Santiago, was an American Catholic member of the Brothers of the Christian Schools who served in Guatemala until his murder in 1982.

Miller served as a teacher first in Cretin High School before being sent to teach in Bluefields in Nicaragua where he remained until his superiors ordered him to leave. He was requested to leave his work in Nicaragua due to political tensions that put Miller at risk of being killed, but he was frustrated to be sent back to his native home, where he remained for some time to teach. He was known for his construction and practical abilities to the point where students at Cretin High School referred to him as "Brother Fix-It." Miller was later sent to Guatemala where he taught, and he remained there until he was murdered. His killer was never identified and brought to justice, despite a long investigation.

Miller's beatification process opened in Huehuetenango in September 2009 and Miller was named a Servant of God. Pope Francis approved Miller's beatification in late 2018. It was celebrated in Huehuetenango in December 2019.

== Life ==
=== Early life ===
James Alfred Miller was born premature on September 21, 1944, to farmers in Stevens Point, Wisconsin; his siblings included his brothers, Bill and Ralph, and sisters, Pat Richter and Louise Shafranski. Miller was baptized at Immaculate Conception Church in Custer, Wisconsin. Miller weighed almost 4 pounds (1.8 kg) at birth; as an adult, he stood 6 ft 2 in (1.88 m) and weighed 220 pounds (100 kg). He was noted for having a boisterous laugh in adulthood that could startle people.

Miller first attended grammar school in a one-room schoolhouse in Custer before entering Pacelli High School, a Catholic school in Stevens Point. It was at Pacelli that he first met members of the De La Salle Christian Brothers. In September 1959, deciding to become a priest, Miller entered their juniorate in Glencoe, Missouri, a high school course based on philosophy. He was admitted in August 1962 as a postulant into the order, commencing his novitiate. Miller assumed the habit of the Christian Brothers and assumed the religious name "Leo William." He attended Saint Mary's University of Minnesota in Winona, Minnesota, where he was awarded a Master of Arts degree in the Spanish language.

After Miller finished college, the Christian Brothers assigned Miller to Cretin High School in St. Paul, Minnesota, where he taught Spanish, English and religious education. He also oversaw maintenance of the facility and coached football. Miller made his perpetual vows to the Christian Brothers in August 1969. After reorganizing the town's volunteer fire department, he was named fire chief.

=== Service in Nicaragua ===
In late 1969, the Christian Brothers sent Miller to Bluefields, Nicaragua, to teach. They transferred him in 1974 to Puerto Cabezas in Nicaragua, where he helped build an industrial arts and vocational complex. Under his leadership as director, the school enrollment increased from 300 to 800 students. He also accepted the task of supervising the construction of ten new rural schools for the Guatemalan Government.

For over 75 years, Nicaragua had been a right wing dictatorship run by the Somaza family. In 1974, the president was Anastasio Somoza Debayle. By the mid-1970s, opposition to the government had developed into a full guerrilla insurrection headed by the Sandinista National Liberation Front (FSLN). The government responded with death squads, military operations and the murder of suspected Sandinista supporters. In turn, the Sandinistas, with military aid from Cuba, began executing people suspected of being collaborators with the government.

Miller had placed himself at risk with the Sandinistas due to his participation in the government's education initiatives. However, his only interest was in giving the people better schools. Rumors soon arose that the Sandinistas had placed his name on a list of people to be "dealt with."In July 1979, the Sandinistas took Managua, the capital of Nicaragua, and forced Somoza to flee the country. Fearing retribution against Miller, the Christian Brothers ordered him to return to the United States.

=== Return to Minnesota ===
When Miller returned to the United States in July 1979, the Christian Brothers assigned him again to teach at what was now Cretin-Derham Hall High School. The students referred to him as "Brother Fix-It" as he dealt with maintenance issues and was often seen with a wrench in his hand. He also assisted students who had forgotten their locker combinations. In 1980, the Christian Brothers sent Miller to Santa Fe, New Mexico, to participate in their Sangre De Cristo renewal program. At that point, Miller reevaluated his plans to enter the priesthood. Since the Christian Brothers did not offer that option, he would have had to join a religious order that did. At that point, he decided to remain a Christian Brother.

After returning to Minnesota, Miller became frustrated with his domestic assignments, writing "I'm bored up here" and "I am anxious to return to Latin America." Unwilling to send him back to Nicaragua, the Christians Brothers gave him an assignment in Guatemala.

=== Assignment to Guatemala Amidst Civil War | Killing of Fr. Stanley Rother ===
Since 1960, a low-level conflict had been in existence in Guatemala between a succession of autocratic military governments and leftist insurgent and protest groups, mainly composed of poor indigenous peoples. The intensity of the war increased in 1978 when Fernando Romeo Lucas García became president. The Carter Administration in the United States had cut off new military aid to Guatemala in 1977 because of human rights violations, but the government there was still receiving funds that had been previously appropriated.

Lucas García intensified army operations throughout the nation and sent out death squads to intimidate or murder indigenous peoples. Unlike in Nicaragua, the Guatemalan government viewed the Catholic Church as an opponent because it was operating missions among these people. Its priests, deacons, religious sisters, and parishioners became targets.

The Christian Brothers in January 1981 assigned Miller to the Colegio De La Salle and the Casa Indígena (Indian Center) in Huehuetenango in Guatemala. Once there, he taught English, religious education, and Guatemalan art to secondary level students. Miller he also taught job and leadership skills to the indigenous peoples in his area. In July 1981, three masked men assassinated now-Blessed Stanley Rother, an American diocesan priest from Oklahoma City, who was operating the Micatokla mission in the city of Santiago Atitlán in Guatemala.

Miller, in a December 1981 letter to his family, described the conditions in Guatemala:

'“The level of personal violence is reaching appalling proportions (murders, tortures, kidnappings, threats) and the Catholic Church is being persecuted because of its option for the poor and oppressed. God knows why he continues to call me to Guatemala…and I pray to God for the grace and strength to serve Him faithfully by my presence among the poor and oppressed. I place my life in His providence; I place my trust in Him.”

During the winter of 1981, the Guatemalan Army was periodically taking students from the Casa Indígena, forcing them to serve the army. This was despite an official agreement to leave the students alone. Paul Joslin, another Christian Brother, had gone to the local police station to demand their release, but the police did nothing. This interference with the army's activities may have led to Miller's shooting.

== Murder ==
On February 13, 1982, Miller was planning an afternoon picnic with his class. Before that, he was outside the Colegio De La Salle on a ladder repairing a broken lamp. He had sent a student inside to fetch a tool. A car containing three hooded and masked men pulled up to the school. After the men shot Miller six or seven times, the car sped off. Miller fell to the ground and died. Several children looking out a school window witnessed the killing. Sr. Madeleva Manzanares Suazo, working in a nearby hospice, was the first to his side.

A funeral service for Miller was first held in Huehuetenango. The white robe on his body quickly became dirty because of all the attendees who wanted to touch it. Over 1,000 of Miller's students accompanied his casket to the local airport. Miller's casket was transported back to Minnesota several days later. A funeral Mass was celebrated on February 16 by Archbishop John Roach at the Cathedral of St. Paul in St. Paul, Minnesota. A second Mass was celebrated on February 18 at Sacred Heart Church in Polonia, Wisconsin, with Bishop Frederick Freking presiding. Miller was interred at St. Martin Cemetery near his birthplace in Ellis, Wisconsin.

No suspects were ever found in Miller's murder. The Guatemalan government expressed regret that the case had dragged on for so long. They ultimately concluded that "subversive criminal elements" were responsible for the murder and closed the case.

== Veneration ==
In 1994, the bishops in Guatemala began gathering information and testimony for the canonization cause of Miller. The Vatican in 1996 started its own investigation of Miller. The cause officially opened in Huehuetenango in September 2009. Pope Benedict XVI, in December 2009, formally introduced the cause after the Congregation for the Causes of Saints (CCS) declared "nihil obstat" ("nothing against the cause").

The bishops in Guatemala concluded their investigation in 2010. In the next step, the CSS issued a decree of validity, declaring Miller a Servant of God. Later that year they received the Positio dossier for Miller. In March 2018, the nine theologians consulting on the Miller cause for the CCS issued a unanimous approval of Miller's beatification. Pope Francis, in November 2018, declared Miller a martyr. As a martyr, no miracles are necessary for his beatification. Following normal procedure, Miller's body was exhumed that year to collect relics and determine whether it was incorrupt (without signs of decay).

Miller's beatification was celebrated on the grounds of the Colegio De La Salle in Huehuetenango on December 7, 2019, with Cardinal José Luis Lacunza Maestrojuán from Panama presiding. The current postulator for his cause is Robert Rodolfo Cosimo Meoli.

== Legacy ==
The La Crosse diocese sponsors an annual Brother James Miller Social Justice Award. The "Brother James Miller Fund" was established after Miller's death with the aim of continuing his work for the poor and oppressed.
