= Katharine Elizabeth Dopp =

American anthropologist

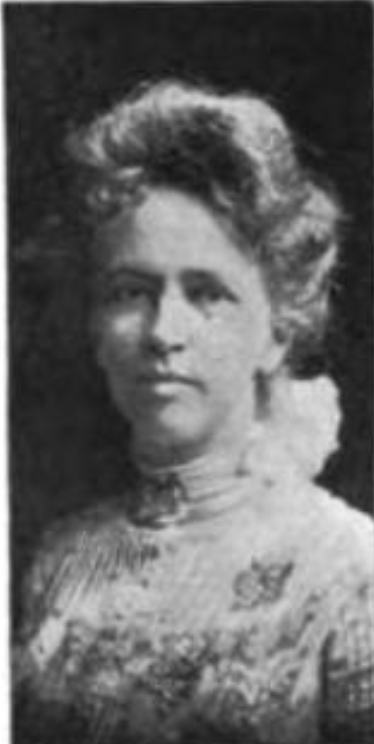
Dopp in 1906

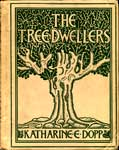
The Tree-Dwellers

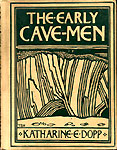
The Early Cave-men

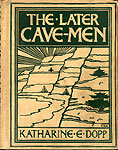
The Later Cave-men

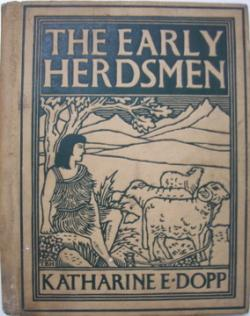
The Early Herdsmen

Katharine Elizabeth Dopp (first name sometimes misspelt as "Katherine", and signed her books of fiction as "Katharine E. Dopp") (b. March 1, 1863 in Portage County, Wisconsin – d. March 14, 1944 in Chicago, Illinois) was one of the foremost American educators at the turn of the 20th century, and one of the first to advocate the involvement of business in education. She wrote a series of textbooks on anthropology and economics which were widely used in the public schools of Wisconsin, Illinois and Utah, as well as nationally circulated studies on the same subjects, and children's books.

== Early life ==
Born in Portage County, Wisconsin on March 1, 1863 in a log cabin, she was the daughter of William Dopp, one of the first white settlers in what at the time was a wilderness area. She descended from a long line of New York Cityers, scattered also across Connecticut and upstate New York as well as the Midwest, and who displayed a marked taste for education over the generations. There was one Homer Dopp who served for in the Wisconsin State Assembly for one term in 1923 after a teaching career. A New England cousin, Raymond Douglas Dopp, was a major name in Connecticut education in the later decades of the 20th century. According to the web site of Dopp family, he was also one of the close aides of General James M. Gavin during the Second World War and was one of the first American officers to access the concentration camp in Buchenwald. Her parents, together with several of her uncles, had left their farms in New England to move to Midwest and to settle on the rich plains in the Indian Territory. She grew up in the area known then as "Dopp Neighborhood" and attended the one room "Dopp School" in what is now in the town of Belmont, in Portage County, surrounded by a large family and the experience of her early years in a farm near the wilderness was to mark her for her life.

== Teacher and writer ==
She started her career as a teacher in her hometown. An avid reader and a lifelong learner, she became fascinated with the study of anthropology. An unusually enterprising and active woman for her time, she attended several universities in Wisconsin and Illinois and earned several degrees, including Doctorates in Philosophy and Education. She was a public school teacher at first and a university professor later. She taught in universities in Wisconsin, Utah and Illinois. Ultimately, she became the Dean of the Chicago Normal School, a teacher's college that later became part of the University of Illinois at Chicago. While there, she was instrumental in designing and implementing correspondence courses for teachers in the public school systems.

Among her works of an academic nature, "The Place of Industries in Elementary Education" was responded by a particularly large calling and was reviewed by John Dewey. Among her children's books, The Tree-Dwellers was widely read in her time.

She was listed for several years in Who's Who in America and, after her death, in Who Was Who in America for years.

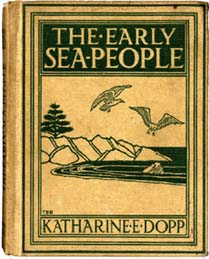
The Early Sea People

== Later life ==
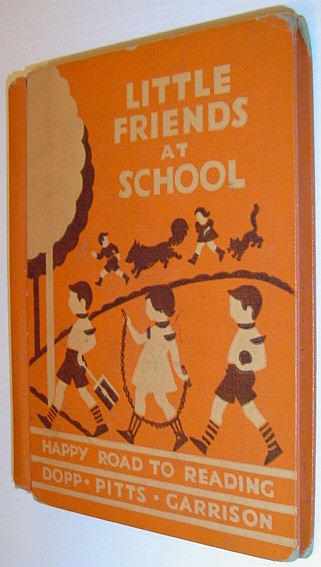
Little Friends at School

Katharine Elizabeth Dopp died in Chicago, Illinois on May 14, 1944. She was buried at Dopp Neighborhood in the Dopp Cemetery next to her parents. She had never married. According to testimonials from her former students, she was a beloved, dedicated teacher.

== Works ==
- The Place of Industries in Elementary Education. University of Chicago. 1910.
- The Tree-Dwellers. Rand McNally. 1904.
- The Early Cave-Men. Rand McNally. 1904.
- The Later Cave-Men. Rand McNally. 1906.
- The Early Sea People. Rand McNally. 1912–1924.
- The Early Herdsmen. New York City: Rand McNally. 1923.
- The Early Farmers. Industrial and social history series. Rand, McNally. 1930.
- Little Friends at School. New York City: Rand McNally. 1935.
