= Dopp, Wisconsin =

- Unincorporated community
- Location within Wisconsin Location within the United States
- Coordinates: 44°15′08.1″N 89°14′40.9″W
- Country: United States
- State: Wisconsin
- County: Portage
- Time zone: UTC-6 (Central (CST))
  - Summer (DST): UTC-5 (CDT)
- Area codes: 715 and 534

Dopp is an unincorporated community in the town of Belmont in Portage County, Wisconsin, United States.

== Geography ==
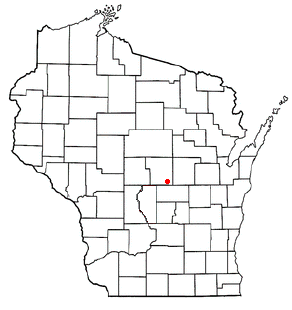
Location of Belmont, Wisconsin

Dopp is located in central Wisconsin, approximately nine miles east of Almond, or four miles north of Wild Rose. Dopp rests on the intersection of Portage County Road AA, and Wisconsin State Highway 22. Wisconsin State Highway 22 in Portage County is a two mile stretch of road between Waupaca County and Waushara County. (Lat: 44° 15' 08.1", Lon: -89° 14' 40.9")

== Local information ==
Dopp was named for the family which had settled in the region. At one time, Dopp featured two schools, a post office, church, and cemetery. Currently, only the church and cemetery still stand - but without congregation. Today, Dopp has a large Dairy Farm (the Dopp Dairy Domain) and the Wisconsin Spray Millet Corporation for industry, still surrounded by rural housing. Many descendants of the Dopp family still reside in the area.

Some consider Dopp and Heffron to be closely related, because of their proximity, both are linked by the local snowmobile trail, and association with nearby Emmons Creek Fishery Area. Dopp can be distinguished by its association to Pearl Creek

== Notable people ==
Dopp was the childhood home of Katharine Elizabeth Dopp, former Dean of the Chicago Normal School (which later became part of the University of Illinois at Chicago).
