= Orestes A. Crowell =

American politician

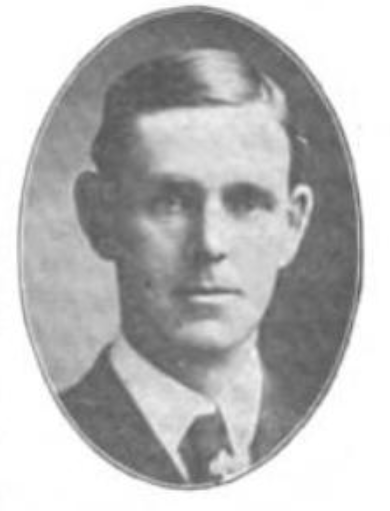

Member of the Wisconsin State Assembly
- In office 1908–1912
- Constituency: Portage County

Personal details
- Born: October 5, 1872 Almond, Wisconsin
- Died: August 17, 1967 (aged 94) Stevens Point, Wisconsin
- Party: Republican
- Occupation: Businessman, farmer, politician

Orestes A. Crowell (October 5, 1872 – August 17, 1967) was an American businessman, farmer, and politician.

Born in Almond, Portage County, Wisconsin, Crowell went to the Almond High School and to the University of Wisconsin. Crowell was involved with farming, mercantile business, real estate, and organized the Portage County Bank of Almond. Crowell served on the Portage County Board of Supervisors, served as postmaster of Almond from 1896 to 1901, and was the first president of the village of Almond, when it was incorporated as a village, in 1905. Crowell served in the Wisconsin State Assembly, as a Republican, in 1909 and 1911. Crowell died in a hospital in Stevens Point, Wisconsin.
