= William M. Scribner =

American politician

William Martell Scribner (May 6, 1877 – May 28, 1936) was an American farmer and politician.

Born in the town of Buena Vista, Portage County, Wisconsin, Scribner graduated from Stevens Port High School in Stevens Point, Wisconsin. He worked for Wisconsin Central Railroad as a roadmaster. Scribner then returned to his family farm, grew potatoes, and raised dairy cows. He then moved to Stevens Point and started the Scribner Dairy with his wife in 1921. Scribner served on the school board as clerk. In 1921, Scribner served in the Wisconsin State Assembly and was a Republican. Scribner died at his home in Stevens Point, Wisconsin from a stroke.
