= Alban (community), Wisconsin =

Alban, Wisconsin
- Unincorporated community
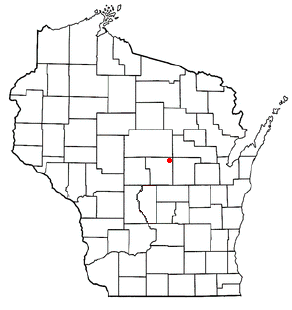
- Location of Alban in Wisconsin
- Coordinates: 44°37′39.7″N 89°17′03.9″W
- Country: United States
- State: Wisconsin
- County: Portage
- Elevation: 1,142 ft (348 m)
- Time zone: UTC-6 (Central (CST))
  - Summer (DST): UTC-5 (CDT)
- Area codes: 715 and 534
- GNIS feature ID: 1560725

Alban is an unincorporated community in the town of Alban in Portage County, Wisconsin, United States.

== Geography ==
Alban is located in central Wisconsin, approximately one-half mile east of Rosholt and approximately three and one-half miles northwest of Peru. (Lat: 44° 37' 39.7", Lon: -89° 17' 03.9"). Located at the intersection of State Road 66 and County Road A, the community is the central location of the town government.

== History ==
Alban was named after Colonel James S. Alban, who was a Portage County attorney, but died in combat during the Civil War. The original Alban was actually south of Peru in the town of New Hope. It was moved to its present-day location when it acquired its own Post Office. The Alban Post Office was absorbed by Rosholt's post office in the 1950s.

Alban was once home to a general store and a church. The church was said to have burned down, but its cemetery remains. Today, Alban still has the town hall and garage to the south, with the Rosholt School District's bus garage and other businesses to the north of State Road 66.
