= Ben Halverson =

American politician

Member of the Wisconsin State Assembly
- In office 1923–1925

Chairman of the Portage County Board of Supervisors

County Treasurer for Portage County
- In office 1903–1907

Personal details
- Born: September 18, 1863 New Hope, Wisconsin, U.S.
- Died: November 6, 1933 (aged 70) New Hope, Wisconsin, U.S.
- Party: Republican
- Occupation: Farmer, businessman

Ben Halvorson (September 18, 1863 – November 6, 1933) was an American farmer, businessman, and politician.

Born in the town of New Hope, Portage County, Wisconsin, Halverson went to Stevens Point High School in Stevens Point, Wisconsin. He was a farmer and a dealer in pumps and windmills. From 1903 to 1907, Halverson was the county treasurer for Portage County. He also served as the New Hope town chairman. Halverson was chairman of the Portage County Board of Supervisors and was a Republican. In 1923 and 1925, Halverson served in the Wisconsin State Assembly. Halverson died at his farm house in New Hope, Wisconsin.
