= Coddington, Wisconsin =

- Unincorporated community
- Location within Wisconsin Location within the United States
- Coordinates: 44°22′12.9″N 89°32′50.8″W
- Country: United States
- State: Wisconsin
- County: Portage
- Elevation: 1,070 ft (330 m)
- Time zone: UTC-6 (Central (CST))
  - Summer (DST): UTC-5 (CDT)
- Area codes: 715 and 534
- GNIS feature ID: 1577554

Coddington is an unincorporated community in the town of Buena Vista in Portage County, Wisconsin, United States.

== History ==
Settlement at Coddington began after the area was drained by the Bradley Polytechnic Institute. In 1911, Wallace Bell "Wallie" Coddington platted "Pine Island" for residential living, surrounded by the present day town roads of Buena Vista Drive, O'Neill Lane, Coddington Road, and Lake Road. He is said to have chosen the name "Pine Island" because of the group of pine trees clustered on a section of higher ground, surrounded by ash and birch trees in the swampy lowlands. After receiving a post office, "Pine Island" was renamed Coddington in honor of its founder.

Coddington had a railroad station at the time when the train passed through the areas of Stevens Point to points southward. Today, Coddington remains only as a small residential subdivision surrounded by the Buena Vista Marsh.

== Geography ==
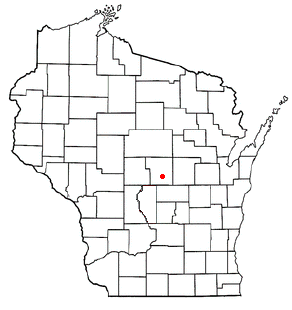
Location of Coddington, Wisconsin

Coddington is located in central Wisconsin, approximately halfway between Bancroft and Plover. Coddington is parallel with mile post 148 on Interstate 39/U.S. Highway 51, although there is no access to Coddington from any main roads. Present-day Coddington is located at the intersection of Coddington Road and Taft Avenue.
