= Adam A. Schider =

American politician

Adam A. Schider (April 21, 1886 – ?) was an American politician.

Born in the Town of Almond, Portage County, Wisconsin, Schider went to business school. He was a farmer and auctioneer. Schider lived in Manawa, Wisconsin. He served on the Waupaca County, Wisconsin Board of Supervisors and served on the school board. Schider also was the town assessor. In 1927, Schider served in the Wisconsin State Assembly and was a Republican.
