= Carson, Wisconsin =

- Town
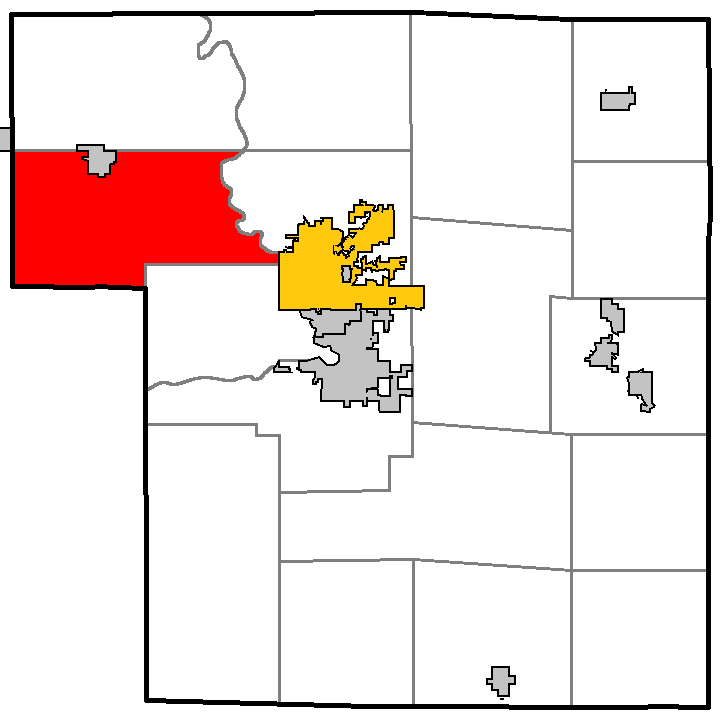
- Location of Carson, Portage County

- Location of Portage County, Wisconsin
- Coordinates: 44°33′40″N 89°44′14″W
- Country: United States
- State: Wisconsin
- County: Portage

Area
  - Total: 55.0 sq mi (142.4 km^{2})
  - Land: 53.9 sq mi (139.6 km^{2})
  - Water: 1.1 sq mi (2.9 km^{2})
- Elevation: 1,122 ft (342 m)

Population (2020)
  - Total: 1,374
  - Density: 25.49/sq mi (9.842/km^{2})
- Time zone: UTC-6 (Central (CST))
  - Summer (DST): UTC-5 (CDT)
- Area codes: 715 & 534
- FIPS code: 55-12725
- GNIS feature ID: 1582918
- Website: http://www.townofcarson.com/

Carson is a town in Portage County, Wisconsin, United States. The population was 1,374 at the 2020 census. The unincorporated communities of Mill Creek Community and Rocky Run are located in the town. The town was most likely named for Samuel Carson, who immigrated from Ireland around 1872.

== Culture ==
The town is referenced in the Miracle Fortress song "Next Train."

== Geography ==
According to the United States Census Bureau, the town has a total area of 55.0 square miles (142.4 km^{2}), of which 53.9 square miles (139.6 km^{2}) is land and 1.1 square miles (2.8 km^{2}) (2.00%) is water.

== Demographics ==
As of the census of 2000, there were 1,299 people, 475 households, and 363 families residing in the town. The population density was 24.1 people per square mile (9.3/km^{2}). There were 499 housing units at an average density of 9.3 per square mile (3.6/km^{2}). The racial makeup of the town was 98.69% White, 0.31% Native American, 0.69% Asian, 0.23% from other races, and 0.08% from two or more races. Hispanic or Latino of any race were 0.38% of the population.

There were 475 households, out of which 34.9% had children under the age of 18 living with them, 68.0% were married couples living together, 5.5% had a female householder with no husband present, and 23.4% were non-families. 18.5% of all households were made up of individuals, and 9.1% had someone living alone who was 65 years of age or older. The average household size was 2.73 and the average family size was 3.13.

In the town, the population was spread out, with 26.2% under the age of 18, 7.5% from 18 to 24, 28.7% from 25 to 44, 26.5% from 45 to 64, and 11.1% who were 65 years of age or older. The median age was 38 years. For every 100 females, there were 109.9 males. For every 100 females aged 18 and over, there were 109.4 males.

The median income for a household in the town was $51,583, and the median income for a family was $58,125. Males had a median income of $37,614 versus $26,202 for females. The per capita income for the town was $21,576. About 1.9% of families and 3.8% of the population were below the poverty line, including 2.4% of those under age 18 and 12.7% of those age 65 or over.
