= Belmont, Portage County, Wisconsin =

Belmont, Wisconsin
- Town
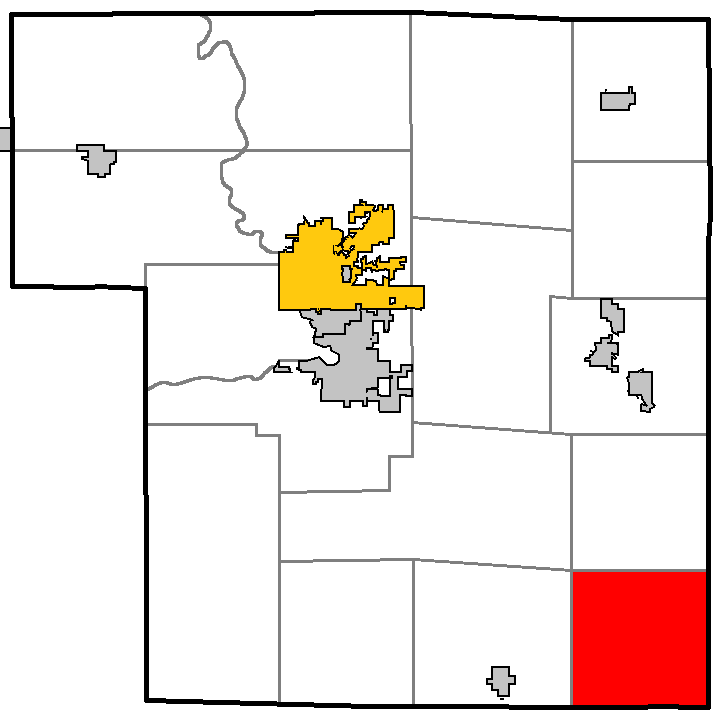
- Location of Belmont, Portage County, Wisconsin

- Location of Portage County, Wisconsin
- Coordinates: 44°17′1″N 89°16′21″W
- Country: United States
- State: Wisconsin
- County: Portage

Area
  - Total: 36.2 sq mi (93.8 km^{2})
  - Land: 36.1 sq mi (93.4 km^{2})
  - Water: 0.15 sq mi (0.4 km^{2})
- Elevation: 1,112 ft (339 m)

Population (2020)
  - Total: 623
  - Density: 17/sq mi (6.7/km^{2})
- Time zone: UTC-6 (Central (CST))
  - Summer (DST): UTC-5 (CDT)
- Area codes: 715 & 534
- FIPS code: 55-06475
- GNIS feature ID: 1582790

Belmont is a town in Portage County, Wisconsin, United States. The population was 623 at the 2020 census. The unincorporated communities of Blaine and Dopp are located within the town. The unincorporated community of Heffron is located partially in the town.

== History ==
The Town of Belmont was founded in 1856, and most likely was named after Belmont, New York.

== Geography ==
According to the United States Census Bureau, the town has a total area of 36.2 square miles (93.8 km^{2}), of which 36.1 square miles (93.4 km^{2}) is land and 0.2 square mile (0.4 km^{2}) (0.44%) is water.

== Demographics ==
As of the 2000 United States census, there were 623 people, 240 households, and 168 families residing in the town. The population density was 17.3 people per square mile (6.7/km^{2}). There were 307 housing units at an average density of 8.5 per square mile (3.3/km^{2}). The racial makeup of the town was 98.88% White, 0.16% Native American, 0.80% from other races, and 0.16% from two or more races. Hispanic or Latino of any race were 3.21% of the population.

There were 240 households, out of which 30.8% had children under the age of 18 living with them, 62.1% were married couples living together, 4.6% had a female householder with no husband present, and 29.6% were non-families. 21.7% of all households were made up of individuals, and 7.5% had someone living alone who was 65 years of age or older. The average household size was 2.58 and the average family size was 3.03.

In the town, the population was spread out, with 24.2% under the age of 18, 7.4% from 18 to 24, 27.9% from 25 to 44, 27.6% from 45 to 64, and 12.8% who were 65 years of age or older. The median age was 40 years. For every 100 females, there were 111.2 males. For every 100 females age 18 and over, there were 107.9 males.

The median income for a household in the town was $46,591, and the median income for a family was $54,531. Males had a median income of $36,786 versus $20,938 for females. The per capita income for the town was $20,427. About 6.5% of families and 9.4% of the population were below the poverty line, including 8.3% of those under age 18 and 5.7% of those age 65 or over.

== Notable people ==
- Katharine Elizabeth Dopp, educator, lived in the Town of Belmont
