= Alban, Wisconsin =

- Town
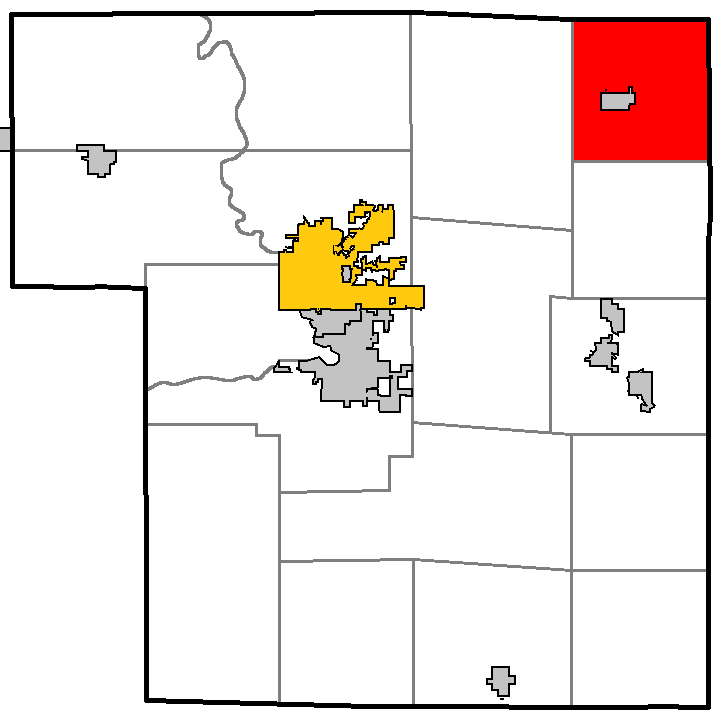
- Location of Alban, Portage County

- Location of Portage County, Wisconsin
- Coordinates: 44°38′3″N 89°16′37″W
- Country: United States
- State: Wisconsin
- County: Portage
- Established: 1877

Area
  - Total: 36.1 sq mi (93.6 km^{2})
  - Land: 35.6 sq mi (92.1 km^{2})
  - Water: 0.58 sq mi (1.5 km^{2})
- Elevation: 1,120 ft (340 m)

Population (2020)
  - Total: 863
  - Density: 24.3/sq mi (9.37/km^{2})
- Time zone: UTC-6 (Central (CST))
  - Summer (DST): UTC-5 (CDT)
- Area codes: 715 & 534
- FIPS code: 55-00725
- GNIS feature ID: 1582664
- Website: https://townofalban.wi.gov/

Alban is a town in Portage County, Wisconsin, United States. The population was 863 at the 2020 census. The unincorporated community of Alban is located within the town. The town was named after Civil War Colonel James S. Alban, a state senator in the early 1850s lost in the Battle of Shiloh. The Township is Town 25 North, Range 10 East, 4th Principal Meridian.

== Geography ==
According to the United States Census Bureau, the town has a total area of 36.1 square miles (93.6 km^{2}), of which 35.5 square miles (92.1 km^{2}) is land and 0.6 square mile (1.5 km^{2}) (1.61%) is water.

== Demographics ==
As of the census of 2000, there were 897 people, 325 households, and 246 families residing in the town. The population density was 25.2 people per square mile (9.7/km^{2}). There were 394 housing units at an average density of 11.1 per square mile (4.3/km^{2}). The racial makeup of the town was 97.32% White, 0.45% African American, 0.33% Asian, 1.34% from other races, and 0.56% from two or more races. Hispanic or Latino of any race were 1.34% of the population.

There were 325 households, out of which 35.4% had children under the age of 18 living with them, 65.2% were married couples living together, 7.7% had a female householder with no husband present, and 24.3% were non-families. 20.0% of all households were made up of individuals, and 9.2% had someone living alone who was 65 years of age or older. The average household size was 2.76 and the average family size was 3.22.

In the town, the population was spread out, with 27.4% under the age of 18, 6.9% from 18 to 24, 27.9% from 25 to 44, 22.4% from 45 to 64, and 15.4% who were 65 years of age or older. The median age was 38 years. For every 100 females, there were 111.6 males. For every 100 females age 18 and over, there were 108.7 males.

The median income for a household in the town was $36,250, and the median income for a family was $41,667. Males had a median income of $33,000 versus $21,641 for females. The per capita income for the town was $15,664. About 7.1% of families and 10.3% of the population were below the poverty line, including 11.6% of those under age 18 and 18.9% of those age 65 or over.
