= Sharon, Walworth County, Wisconsin =

Town of Sharon, Wisconsin
- Town
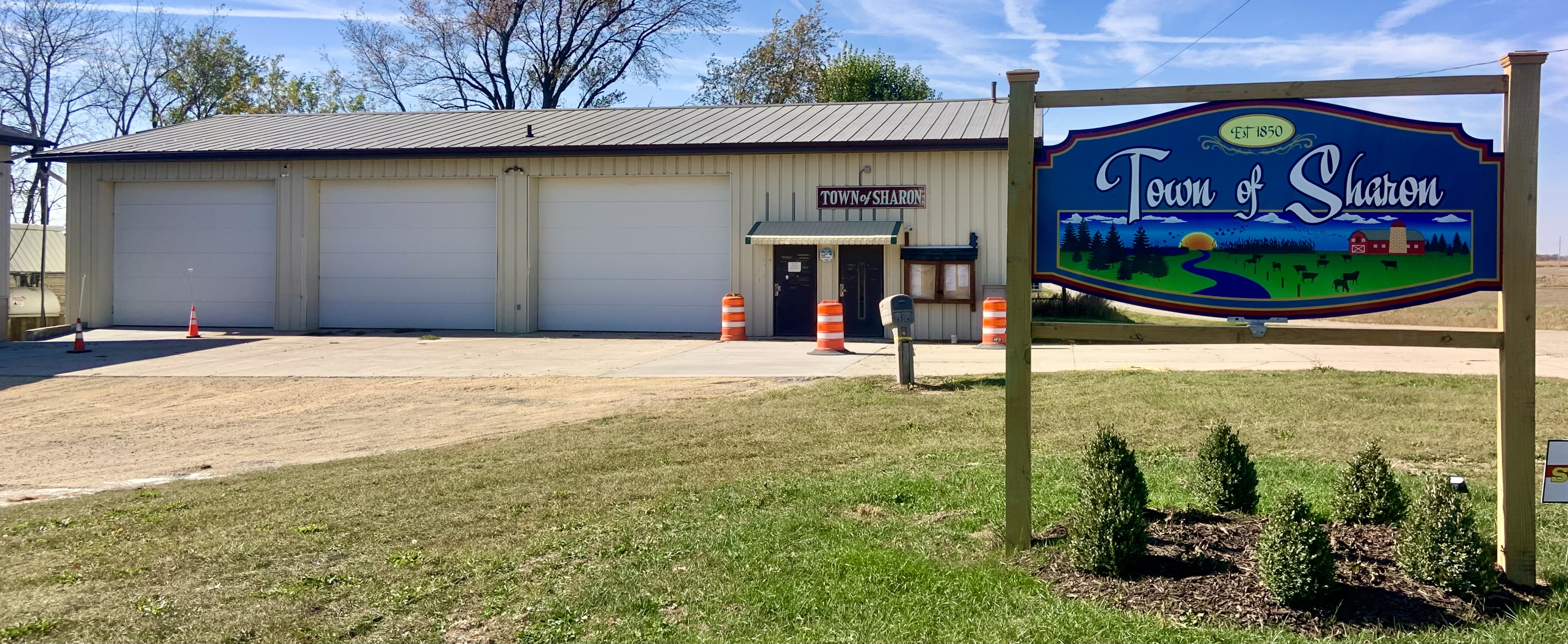
- Town hall

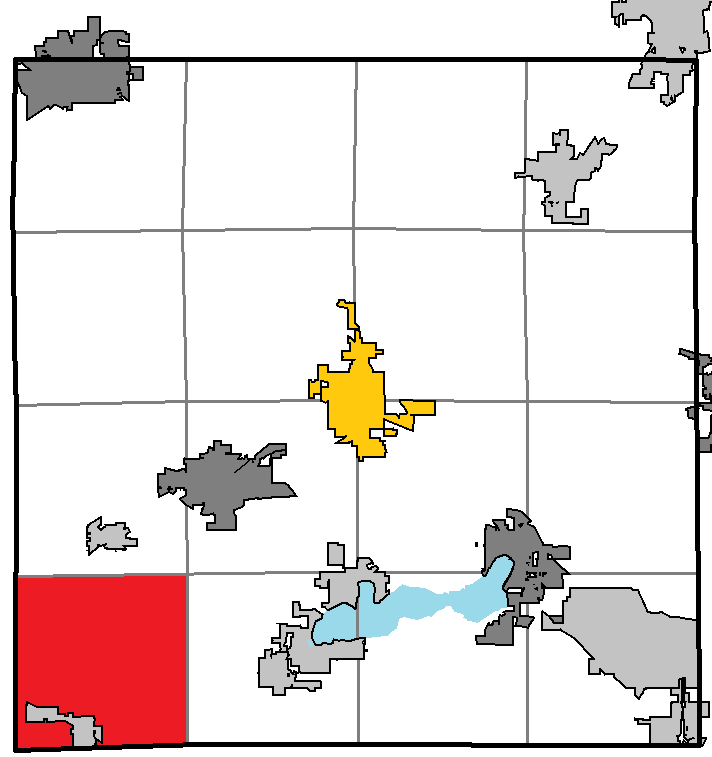
- Location of Sharon, within Walworth County

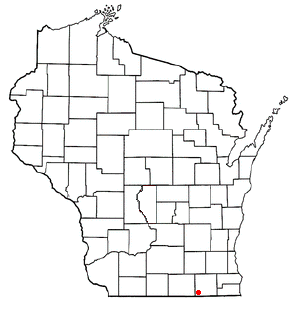
- Location of the Town of Sharon, Wisconsin
- Coordinates: 42°32′57″N 88°43′4″W
- Country: United States
- State: Wisconsin
- County: Walworth

Area
  - Total: 35.6 sq mi (92.1 km^{2})
  - Land: 35.6 sq mi (92.1 km^{2})
  - Water: 0 sq mi (0.0 km^{2})
- Elevation: 950 ft (290 m)

Population (2020)
  - Total: 861
  - Density: 26/sq mi (9.9/km^{2})
- Time zone: UTC-6 (Central (CST))
  - Summer (DST): UTC-5 (CDT)
- Area code: 262
- FIPS code: 55-72900
- GNIS feature ID: 1584134
- Website: https://tnsharonwcwi.gov/

There is another Town of Sharon, in Portage County.

Sharon is a town in Walworth County, Wisconsin, United States. The population was 861 at the 2020 census. The Village of Sharon is located within the town. The unincorporated community of Allen's Grove is also located partially in the town.

== Geography ==
According to the United States Census Bureau, the town has a total area of 35.6 square miles (92.1 km^{2}), of which 35.5 square miles (92.1 km^{2}) is land and 0.03% is water.

== Demographics ==
As of the census of 2000, there were 912 people, 333 households, and 274 families residing in the town. The population density was 25.7 people per square mile (9.9/km^{2}). There were 352 housing units at an average density of 9.9 per square mile (3.8/km^{2}). The racial makeup of the town was 98.46% White, 0.11% Asian, 0.55% from other races, and 0.88% from two or more races. 2.19% of the population were Hispanic or Latino of any race.

There were 333 households, out of which 31.8% had children under the age of 18 living with them, 72.7% were married couples living together, 6.0% had a female householder with no husband present, and 17.7% were non-families. 15.9% of all households were made up of individuals, and 9.0% had someone living alone who was 65 years of age or older. The average household size was 2.74 and the average family size was 3.05.

In the town, the population was spread out, with 26.1% under the age of 18, 5.3% from 18 to 24, 27.1% from 25 to 44, 27.2% from 45 to 64, and 14.4% who were 65 years of age or older. The median age was 41 years. For every 100 females, there were 106.8 males. For every 100 females age 18 and over, there were 101.8 males.

The median income for a household in the town was $51,635, and the median income for a family was $56,250. Males had a median income of $35,500 versus $26,700 for females. The per capita income for the town was $20,023. About 6.3% of families and 7.0% of the population were below the poverty line, including 7.3% of those under age 18 and 7.2% of those age 65 or over.
