= Allen's Grove, Wisconsin =

Census-designated place in Wisconsin, United States

- Unincorporated community and census-designated place
- Location within Wisconsin Location within the United States
- Coordinates: 42°34′49″N 88°45′45″W
- Country: United States
- State: Wisconsin
- County: Walworth
- Elevation: 932 ft (284 m)

Population (2020)
  - Total: 174
- Time zone: UTC-6 (Central (CST))
  - Summer (DST): UTC-5 (CDT)
- Area code: 262
- GNIS feature ID: 1560780

Allen's Grove (alternatively spelled Allens Grove, Allen Grove, or Allengrove) is an unincorporated community and census-designated place in Walworth County, Wisconsin, United States. It is located approximately two miles west of Darien, in the Towns of Darien and Sharon, at 42°34′49″N 88°45′45″W. It was first named a CDP at the 2020 census, which showed a population of 174.

== History ==
Philip Allen, a Revolutionary War veteran, and his children: Philip Jr., Harvey, Sidney, Pliny, Asa Keyes, and Persis, came from New York in May 1845, to settle in Allen Grove. Sixty-five Allens traveled by canal boat, steamboat, and overland from Kenosha bringing with them material to build four houses, carpenters to build them, a minister, Bibles, and hymnals. The Allens organized the Congregational church here in 1845. They established a preparatory school for Beloit College in 1856. Philip Junior became the first postmaster in 1846. Philip Allen Sr. is buried in Mt. Philip Cemetery, west of here.

== Demographics ==
As of 2023 estimates, Allen's Grove has a population of 177, a median age of 34.2, and a median income of $91,875. The per capita income is placed at $29,967±$4,135 and 15.3% ±19.5% are below the poverty line. There are 61 ±18 households and 2.9 ±0.7 persons per household. Of these households, 67% are married, 18% are male owned households, 4% female owned, and 11% non-family dwelling.

=== Ethnicity ===
The community is estimated at White (91.5%)/161.755 people and Hispanic (8.5%)/15.005 people.

Historical population
Census	Pop.	Note	%±
2020	174		—
2023 (est.)	177	▲	1.7%
U.S. Decennial Census
