= Blaine, Portage County, Wisconsin =

Blaine, Wisconsin
- Unincorporated community
- Location within Wisconsin Location within the United States
- Coordinates: 44°18′31.8″N 89°18′54.7″W
- Country: United States
- State: Wisconsin
- County: Portage
- Elevation: 1,122 ft (342 m)
- Time zone: UTC-6 (Central (CST))
  - Summer (DST): UTC-5 (CDT)
- Area codes: 715 and 534
- GNIS feature ID: 1561908

Blaine is an unincorporated community in Portage County, Wisconsin, United States.

== Geography ==
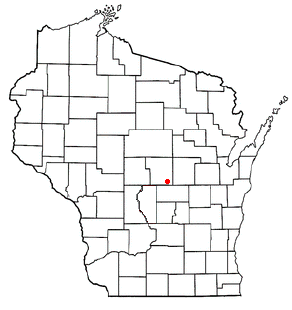
Location of Belmont, Wisconsin

Blaine (Portage County) is located in central Wisconsin, approximately four miles northeast of Almond, or nine miles south of Amherst (Lat: 44° 18' 31.8", Lon: -89° 18' 54.7"). Blaine is located in the town of Belmont. Blaine intersects Portage County Highways A & D, and the Belmont Township Road "Fourth Avenue", approximately four miles south of Wisconsin State Highway 54.

== History ==
Blaine became the site of a rural post office in 1876 and was probably named after James G. Blaine, a leading Republican who was defeated in the 1884 presidential election. The community included a country store, a Methodist church, a creamery, a blacksmith shop and a grange hall. The post office was discontinued in 1903, but the grange hall remains, serving as the Belmont Town Hall.

== Economy ==
Blaine is home to the Blaine Store, a church and several houses.
