= Garfield, Portage County, Wisconsin =

Garfield, Wisconsin
- Unincorporated community
- Location within Wisconsin Location within the United States
- Coordinates: 44°33′43.4″N 89°17′38.1″W
- Country: United States
- State: Wisconsin
- County: Portage
- Elevation: 1,145 ft (349 m)
- Time zone: UTC-6 (Central (CST))
  - Summer (DST): UTC-5 (CDT)
- Area codes: 715 and 534
- GNIS feature ID: 1577608

Garfield is an unincorporated community in Portage County, Wisconsin, United States.

== Geography ==
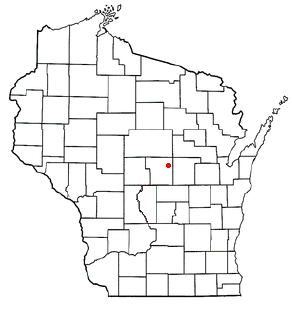
Location of Garfield, Wisconsin

Garfield is located in central Wisconsin approximately halfway between Rosholt and Nelsonville on Portage County Road A, approximately 2 1/2 miles (4.0 km) west of Peru. It rests on the present-day location in the Town of New Hope at the intersection of Portage County Roads A south and Z to the east.

Poncho Creek and the Tomorrow River, southwest of Garfield, are becoming a part of the Richard A. Hemp Fishery Area.
