= Rose, Wisconsin =

- Town
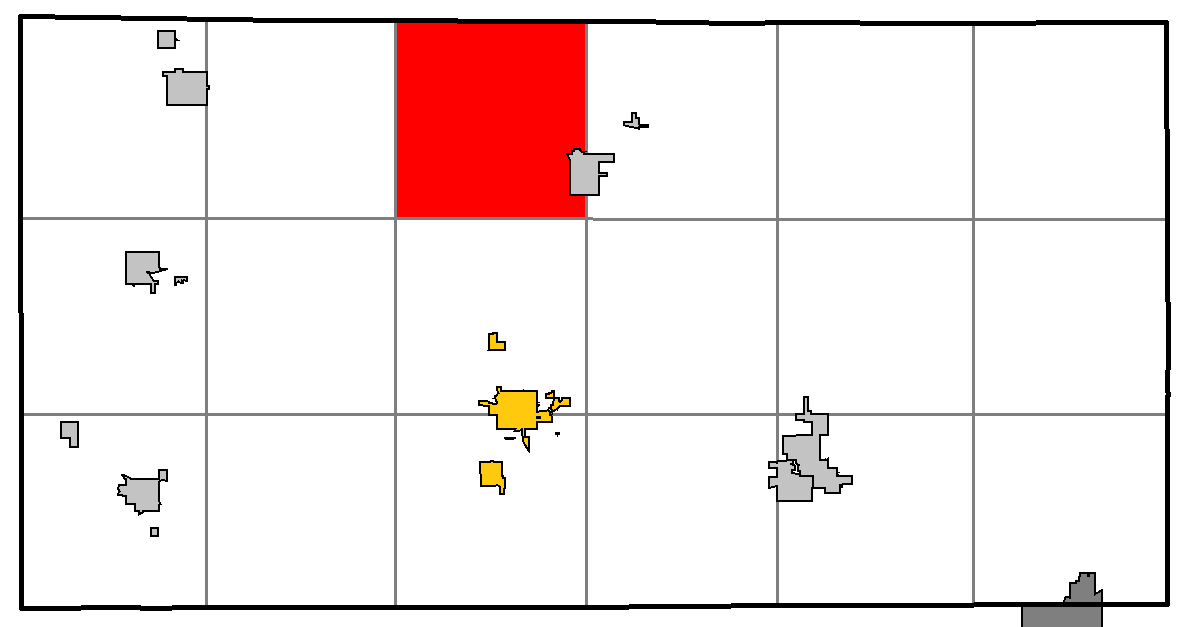
- Location of Rose, Waushara County

- Location of Waushara County, Wisconsin
- Coordinates: 44°11′58″N 89°19′12″W
- Country: United States
- State: Wisconsin
- County: Waushara

Area
  - Total: 34.9 sq mi (90.5 km^{2})
  - Land: 34.9 sq mi (90.3 km^{2})
  - Water: 0.077 sq mi (0.2 km^{2})
- Elevation: 1,106 ft (337 m)

Population (2020)
  - Total: 661
  - Density: 19.0/sq mi (7.32/km^{2})
- Time zone: UTC-6 (Central (CST))
  - Summer (DST): UTC-5 (CDT)
- FIPS code: 55-69425
- GNIS feature ID: 1584063
- Website: https://townofrosewi.com/

Rose is a town in Waushara County, Wisconsin, United States. The population was 661 at the 2020 census. The unincorporated community of Heffron is located partially in the town.

== Geography ==
According to the United States Census Bureau, the town has a total area of 34.9 square miles (90.5 km^{2}), of which 34.9 square miles (90.3 km^{2}) is land and 0.1 square mile (0.2 km^{2}) (0.17%) is water.

== Demographics ==
As of the census of 2000, there were 595 people, 244 households, and 182 families residing in the town. The population density was 17.1 people per square mile (6.6/km^{2}). There were 353 housing units at an average density of 10.1 per square mile (3.9/km^{2}). The racial makeup of the town was 97.65% White, 0.34% African American, 1.01% from other races, and 1.01% from two or more races. Hispanic or Latino of any race were 2.86% of the population.

There were 244 households, out of which 25.0% had children under the age of 18 living with them, 63.9% were married couples living together, 7.0% had a female householder with no husband present, and 25.4% were non-families. 20.1% of all households were made up of individuals, and 10.2% had someone living alone who was 65 years of age or older. The average household size was 2.44 and the average family size was 2.78.

In the town, the population was spread out, with 20.5% under the age of 18, 6.2% from 18 to 24, 25.2% from 25 to 44, 31.4% from 45 to 64, and 16.6% who were 65 years of age or older. The median age was 44 years. For every 100 females, there were 113.3 males. For every 100 females age 18 and over, there were 114.0 males.

The median income for a household in the town was $34,792, and the median income for a family was $40,417. Males had a median income of $31,250 versus $22,639 for females. The per capita income for the town was $17,630. About 3.4% of families and 10.3% of the population were below the poverty line, including 8.0% of those under age 18 and 12.3% of those age 65 or over.
