= Custer, Wisconsin =

- Unincorporated community
- Location within Wisconsin Location within the United States
- Coordinates: 44°30′38″N 89°25′34″W
- Country: United States
- State: Wisconsin
- County: Portage
- Elevation: 1,165 ft (355 m)
- Time zone: UTC-6 (Central (CST))
  - Summer (DST): UTC-5 (CDT)
- Area codes: 715 and 534
- GNIS feature ID: 1563644

Custer is an unincorporated community located in the town of Stockton, in Portage County, Wisconsin, United States.

== History ==
The origin of the community's name is not confirmed but general consensus is it was named after Lt. Col. George Armstrong Custer, who was defeated during the battle of the Little Big Horn in 1876. The Custer post office was established in December 1876, just six months after the Battle of Little Big Horn. The community was originally called "Dawson." The only evidence for this name comes from an August 8, 1854 land deed, which records the sale of a large piece of land near St. Mary's Church to Michael Dawson. There is no biographical information about him in St. Mary’s documents, though there was a Michael Dawson who was elected to the town of Hull board in 1859 and to the town of Sharon board in 1860.

== Geography ==
Custer is located in central Wisconsin approximately halfway between Stevens Point, and Amherst.

== Economy ==
Custer is the host site of the annual Renewable Energy and Sustainable Living Fair sponsored by the Midwest Renewable Energy Association. Custer has a post office designated by the zip code 54423.

== Notable people ==
- Janel McCarville, basketball player - WNBA Minnesota Lynx.
- James Miller, murdered Christian Brother
