= Ellis, Wisconsin =

- Unincorporated community
- Location within Wisconsin Location within the United States
- Coordinates: 44°34′30.7″N 89°26′47.9″W
- Country: United States
- State: Wisconsin
- County: Portage
- Elevation: 1,171 ft (357 m)
- Time zone: UTC-6 (Central (CST))
  - Summer (DST): UTC-5 (CDT)
- Area codes: 715 and 534
- GNIS feature ID: 1564540

Ellis is an unincorporated community in the town of Sharon, Portage County, Wisconsin, United States.

== History ==
Originally known as Poland Corners, Ellis was renamed in 1867 when the post office was established. It was named in honor of Albert G. Ellis, who was the mayor of Stevens Point, Wisconsin at the time.

== Geography ==
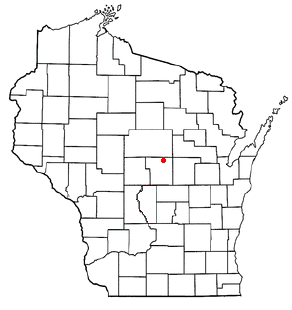
Location of Sharon, Wisconsin

Ellis is located in central Wisconsin approximately six miles northeast of Stevens Point, approximately four miles north of Custer, and approximately six miles southwest of Rosholt, where State Road 66 and Portage County Road J to the south meets with Ellis Road. Ellis is located on State Road 66 between Portage County Road K to the north and K to the south in Polonia.
