= Keene, Wisconsin =

- Unincorporated community
- Location within Wisconsin Location within the United States
- Coordinates: 44°22′01″N 89°28′27″W
- Country: United States
- State: Wisconsin
- County: Portage
- Elevation: 1,079 ft (329 m)
- Time zone: UTC-6 (Central (CST))
  - Summer (DST): UTC-5 (CDT)
- Area codes: 715 and 534
- GNIS feature ID: 1577671

Keene is an unincorporated community located in the town of Buena Vista, Portage County, Wisconsin, United States. The community is likely named for Valentine and Kate Keene, who emigrated to the area from Poland in the 1860s. The Keene post office operated from 1870 to 1904.
