= New Hope, Wisconsin =

- Town
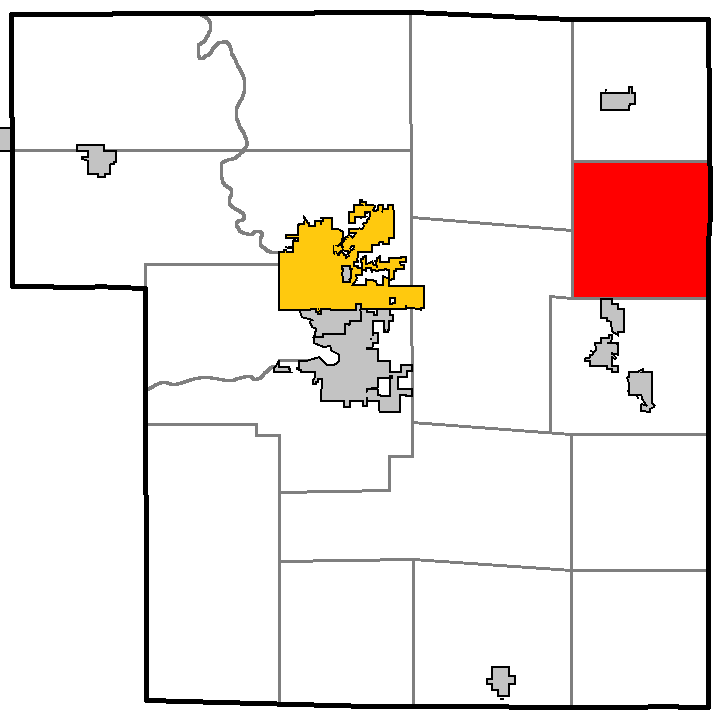
- Location of New Hope, Portage County

- Location of New Hope, Wisconsin
- Coordinates: 44°32′52″N 89°17′03″W
- Country: United States
- State: Wisconsin
- County: Portage

Area
  - Total: 36.4 sq mi (94.2 km^{2})
  - Land: 35.9 sq mi (92.9 km^{2})
  - Water: 0.50 sq mi (1.3 km^{2})
- Elevation: 1,135 ft (346 m)

Population (2020)
  - Total: 711
  - Density: 19.8/sq mi (7.65/km^{2})
- Time zone: UTC-6 (Central (CST))
  - Summer (DST): UTC-5 (CDT)
- Area codes: 715 & 534
- FIPS code: 55-56850
- GNIS feature ID: 1583811
- Website: https://tn.newhope.wi.gov/

New Hope is a town in Portage County, Wisconsin, United States. The population was 711 at the 2020 census. The unincorporated communities of New Hope, Garfield, and Peru are located in the town.

== Geography ==
According to the United States Census Bureau, the town has a total area of 36.4 square miles (94.2 km^{2}), of which 35.9 square miles (92.9 km^{2}) is land and 0.5 square mile (1.3 km^{2}) (1.38%) is water.

== Demographics ==
As of the census of 2000, there were 736 people, 278 households, and 219 families residing in the town. The population density was 20.5 people per square mile (7.9/km^{2}). There were 365 housing units at an average density of 10.2 per square mile (3.9/km^{2}). The racial makeup of the town was 99.05% White, 0.27% Native American, 0.14% from other races, and 0.54% from two or more races. Hispanic or Latino of any race were 0.82% of the population.

There were 278 households, out of which 34.2% had children under the age of 18 living with them, 68.0% were married couples living together, 7.2% had a female householder with no husband present, and 21.2% were non-families. 16.5% of all households were made up of individuals, and 7.6% had someone living alone who was 65 years of age or older. The average household size was 2.65 and the average family size was 3.00.

In the town, the population was spread out, with 25.7% under the age of 18, 5.4% from 18 to 24, 27.7% from 25 to 44, 26.4% from 45 to 64, and 14.8% who were 65 years of age or older. The median age was 41 years. For every 100 females, there were 107.3 males. For every 100 females age 18 and over, there were 100.4 males.

The median income for a household in the town was $46,538, and the median income for a family was $48,125. Males had a median income of $35,208 versus $27,375 for females. The per capita income for the town was $21,334. About 3.9% of families and 6.3% of the population were below the poverty line, including 5.2% of those under age 18 and none of those age 65 or over.

== Notable people ==
- Ben Halverson, Wisconsin State Representative
- Adelaide Hiebel, artist and illustrator
- Lowell C. Kilday, United States diplomat
