= Grant, Portage County, Wisconsin =

Grant, Wisconsin
- Town
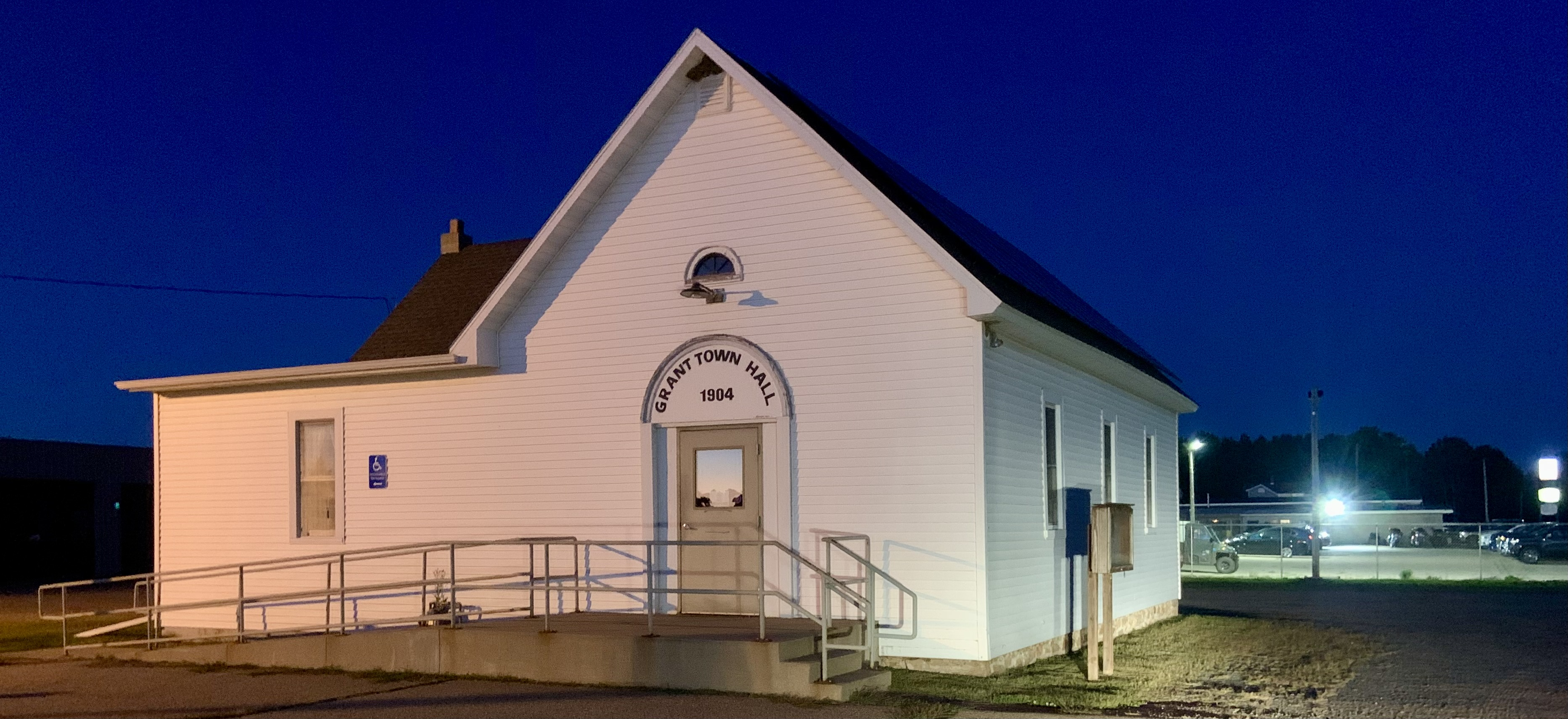
- Town hall

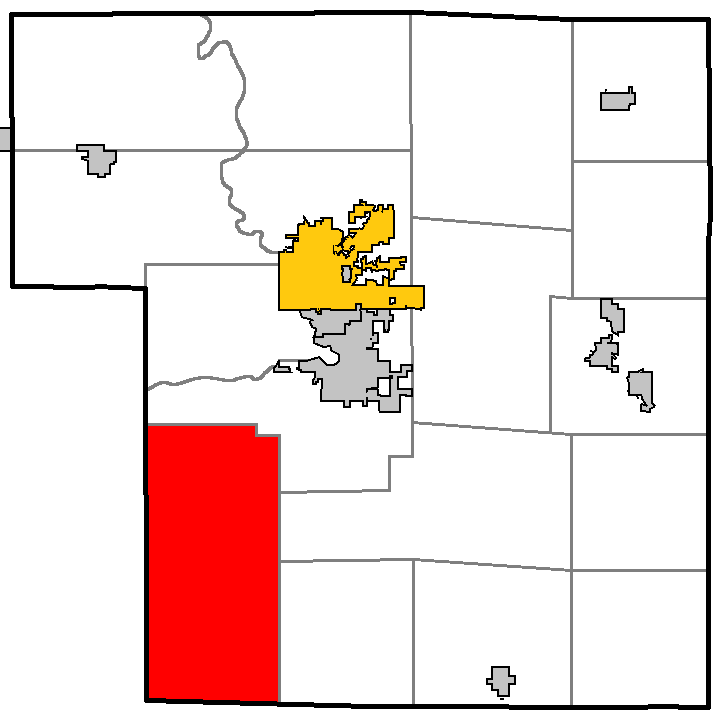
- Location of Grant, Portage County, Wisconsin

- Location of Portage County, Wisconsin
- Coordinates: 44°20′54″N 89°40′39″W
- Country: United States
- State: Wisconsin
- County: Portage

Area
  - Total: 71.2 sq mi (184.5 km^{2})
  - Land: 71.2 sq mi (184.5 km^{2})
  - Water: 0.039 sq mi (0.1 km^{2})
- Elevation: 1,050 ft (320 m)

Population (2020)
  - Total: 1,842
  - Density: 25.86/sq mi (9.984/km^{2})
- Time zone: UTC-6 (Central (CST))
  - Summer (DST): UTC-5 (CDT)
- Area codes: 715 & 534
- FIPS code: 55-30350
- GNIS feature ID: 1583301
- Website: https://townofgrant-portage.wi.gov/

Grant is a town in Portage County, Wisconsin, United States. The population was 1,842 at the 2020 census. The unincorporated community of Kellner is located partially in the town.

== Geography ==
According to the United States Census Bureau, the town has a total area of 71.2 square miles (184.5 km^{2}), of which, 71.2 square miles (184.5 km^{2}) of it is land and 0.04 square miles (0.1 km^{2}) of it (0.03%) is water.

== Demographics ==
As of the census of 2000, there were 2,020 people, 726 households, and 580 families residing in the town. The population density was 28.4 people per square mile (11.0/km^{2}). There were 748 housing units at an average density of 10.5 per square mile (4.1/km^{2}). The racial makeup of the town was 97.38% White, 0.05% African American, 0.89% Native American, 0.99% Asian, 0.15% from other races, and 0.54% from two or more races. Hispanic or Latino of any race were 0.74% of the population.

There were 726 households, out of which 39.7% had children under the age of 18 living with them, 70.7% were married couples living together, 5.0% had a female householder with no husband present, and 20.0% were non-families. 15.3% of all households were made up of individuals, and 4.4% had someone living alone who was 65 years of age or older. The average household size was 2.78 and the average family size was 3.10.

In the town, the population was spread out, with 28.7% under the age of 18, 5.0% from 18 to 24, 32.5% from 25 to 44, 25.1% from 45 to 64, and 8.6% who were 65 years of age or older. The median age was 37 years. For every 100 females, there were 111.7 males. For every 100 females age 18 and over, there were 110.8 males.

The median income for a household in the town was $52,459, and the median income for a family was $56,417. Males had a median income of $43,654 versus $24,881 for females. The per capita income for the town was $21,793. About 1.9% of families and 2.9% of the population were below the poverty line, including 1.9% of those under age 18 and 4.7% of those age 65 or over.
