= Polonia, Wisconsin =

Census-designated place in Wisconsin, United States

- Census-designated place
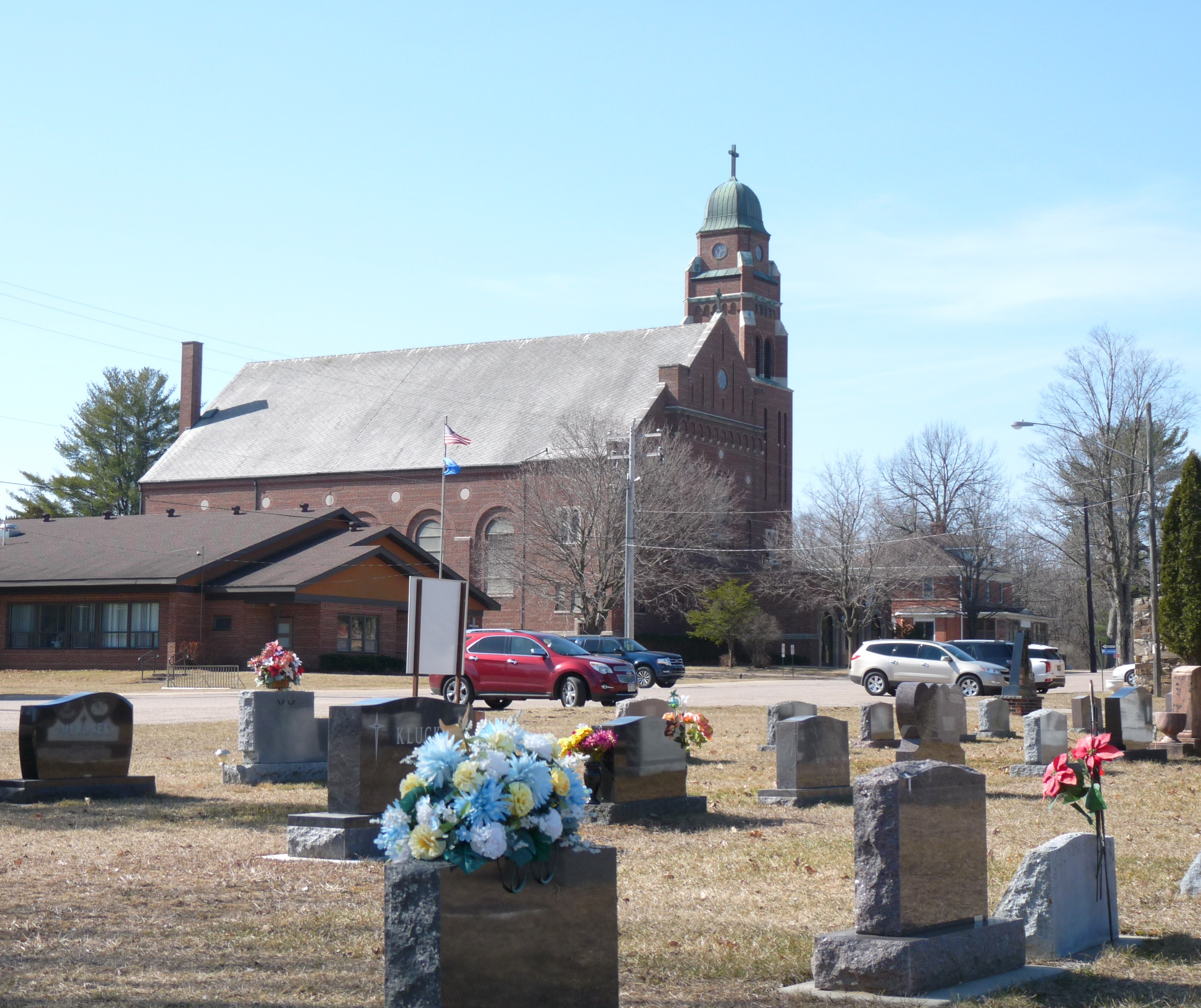
- Sacred Heart Catholic Church

- Location within Wisconsin Location within the United States
- Coordinates: 44°34′12″N 89°24′47″W
- Country: United States
- State: Wisconsin
- County: Portage

Area
  - Total: 3.371 sq mi (8.73 km^{2})
  - Land: 3.341 sq mi (8.65 km^{2})
  - Water: 0.030 sq mi (0.078 km^{2})
- Elevation: 1,211 ft (369 m)

Population (2020)
  - Total: 565
  - Density: 169/sq mi (65.3/km^{2})
- Time zone: UTC-6 (Central (CST))
  - Summer (DST): UTC-5 (CDT)
- Zip code: 54423, 54468
- Area codes: 715 & 534
- GNIS feature ID: 1571745

Polonia is an unincorporated census-designated place in the town of Sharon, Portage County, Wisconsin, United States. It is located on Wisconsin Highway 66, two miles east of Ellis and approximately eight miles southwest of Rosholt.. The population according to the 2020 census was 565.

== History ==
In 1858, five Polish immigrant families joined a German farming community at Ellis, two miles to the west of what would become Polonia. These families were probably the first Polish agricultural community in Wisconsin.

Some of the newly-arrived Poles at Ellis worshiped there with their German neighbors at St Martin's Catholic church for a few years, but after their numbers swelled to twenty or thirty families, they split in 1865 into a separate Polish-speaking Catholic church at Ellis. Three saloons stood nearby and worship was interrupted too often by noise and brawls at Ellis's saloons, so in 1871 the Polish Catholic church building was moved to a hill two miles to the east. Father Dabrowski called that hill Polonia.

In 1874 a church school was started at Polonia, staffed by five Felician Sisters who were sent as missionaries from Kraków, Poland. By 1907 the parish had grown to 320 families, the school instructed 200 students, and the parish complex include an orphanage for 46 boys.

== Geography ==
Polonia has an area of 3.371 square miles (8.73 km^{2}), 3.341 square miles (8.65 km^{2}) of which is land and 0.030 square miles (0.078 km^{2}) is water.
