= Buena Vista, Portage County, Wisconsin =

Buena Vista, Wisconsin
- Town
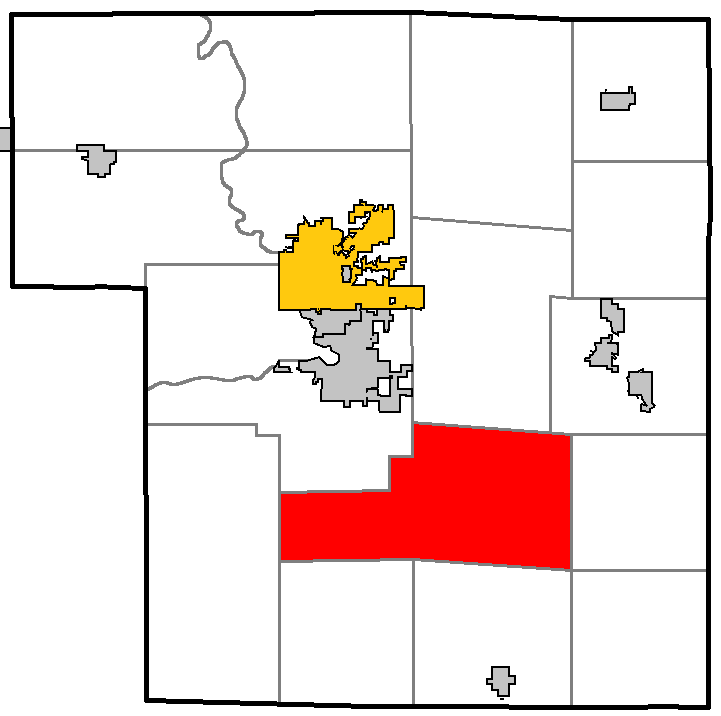
- Location of Buena Vista, Portage County, Wisconsin

- Location of Portage County, Wisconsin
- Coordinates: 44°22′23″N 89°26′34″W
- Country: United States
- State: Wisconsin
- County: Portage

Area
  - Total: 61.4 sq mi (158.9 km^{2})
  - Land: 61.3 sq mi (158.8 km^{2})
  - Water: 0.039 sq mi (0.1 km^{2})
- Elevation: 1,122 ft (342 m)

Population (2020)
  - Total: 1,145
  - Density: 18.67/sq mi (7.210/km^{2})
- Time zone: UTC-6 (Central (CST))
  - Summer (DST): UTC-5 (CDT)
- Area codes: 715 & 534
- FIPS code: 55-10925
- GNIS feature ID: 1582882

Buena Vista is a town in Portage County, Wisconsin, United States. The population was 1,145 at the 2020 census. The unincorporated communities of Coddington and Keene are located within the town.

The town's name commemorates the Battle of Buena Vista in the Mexican–American War.

== Geography ==
According to the United States Census Bureau, the town has a total area of 61.4 square miles (158.9 km^{2}), of which 61.3 square miles (158.8 km^{2}) is land and 0.04 square mile (0.1 km^{2}) (0.07%) is water.

== Demographics ==
As of the census of 2000, there were 1,187 people, 418 households, and 318 families residing in the town. The population density was 19.4 people per square mile (7.5/km^{2}). There were 446 housing units at an average density of 7.3 per square mile (2.8/km^{2}). The racial makeup of the town was 98.48% White, 0.08% African American, 0.34% Native American, 0.25% Asian, 0.34% from other races, and 0.51% from two or more races. Hispanic or Latino of any race were 1.26% of the population.

There were 418 households, out of which 38.5% had children under the age of 18 living with them, 66.0% were married couples living together, 5.5% had a female householder with no husband present, and 23.7% were non-families. 17.0% of all households were made up of individuals, and 4.5% had someone living alone who was 65 years of age or older. The average household size was 2.84 and the average family size was 3.22.

In the town, the population was spread out, with 28.3% under the age of 18, 8.0% from 18 to 24, 30.4% from 25 to 44, 24.3% from 45 to 64, and 8.9% who were 65 years of age or older. The median age was 36 years. For every 100 females, there were 109.0 males. For every 100 females age 18 and over, there were 107.6 males.

The median income for a household in the town was $46,920, and the median income for a family was $49,519. Males had a median income of $31,908 versus $22,614 for females. The per capita income for the town was $18,775. About 4.7% of families and 5.9% of the population were below the poverty line, including 6.3% of those under age 18 and 17.3% of those age 65 or over.

== Notable people ==
- William M. Scribner, Wisconsin State Representative and farmer, was born in the town

== See also ==
- List of towns in Wisconsin
