= Kellner, Wisconsin =

- Unincorporated community
- Location within Wisconsin Location within the United States
- Coordinates: 44°21′32″N 89°43′29″W
- Country: United States
- State: Wisconsin
- Counties: Portage and Wood
- Elevation: 1,037 ft (316 m)
- Time zone: UTC-6 (Central (CST))
  - Summer (DST): UTC-5 (CDT)
- Area codes: 715 & 534
- GNIS feature ID: 1567384

Kellner is an unincorporated community located in Portage and Wood counties, Wisconsin, United States. The Portage County portion of Kellner is located in the town of Grant, while the Wood County portion is located in the town of Grand Rapids. Kellner is located at the junction of County Highways U and WW, 5.5 miles (8.9 km) east-southeast of Wisconsin Rapids.

== History ==
Kellner was laid out in 1901, and named after F. E. Kellner, a land agent.
