= Sharon, Portage County, Wisconsin =

Sharon, Wisconsin
- Town
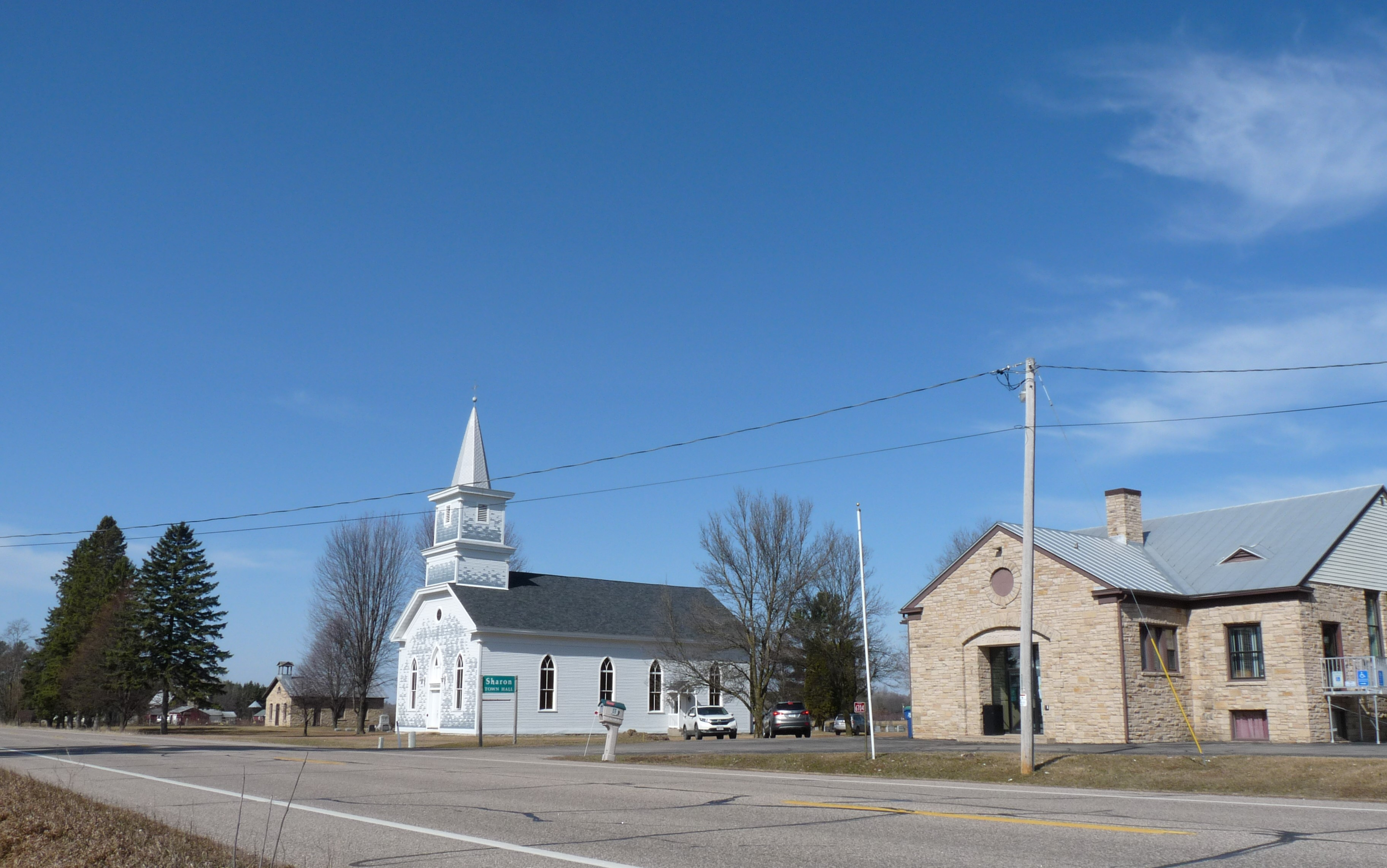
- Sharon's town hall is on the right

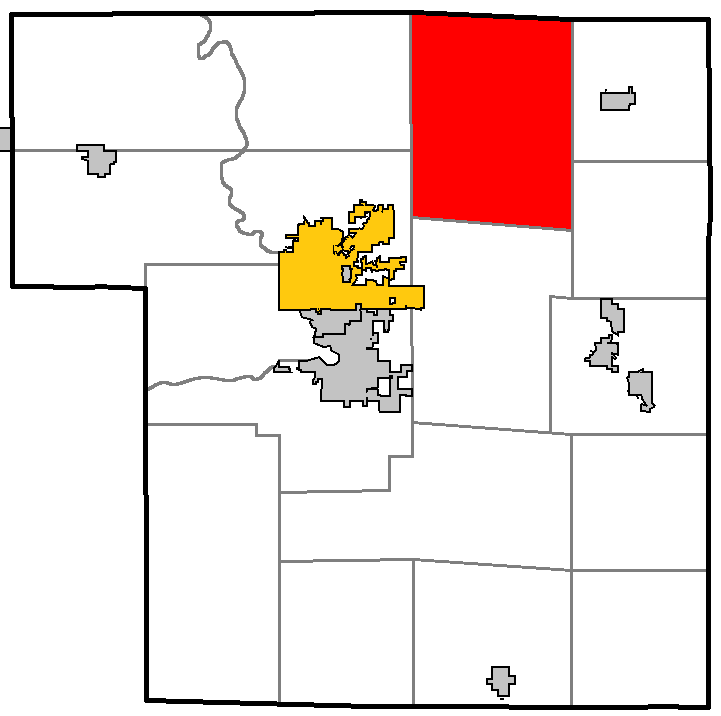
- Location of Sharon, Portage County, Wisconsin

- Location of Portage County, Wisconsin
- Coordinates: 44°36′32″N 89°25′0″W
- Country: United States
- State: Wisconsin
- County: Portage

Area
  - Total: 64.9 sq mi (168.0 km^{2})
  - Land: 64.3 sq mi (166.5 km^{2})
  - Water: 0.58 sq mi (1.5 km^{2})
- Elevation: 1,180 ft (360 m)

Population (2020)
  - Total: 2,123
  - Density: 33.02/sq mi (12.75/km^{2})
- Time zone: UTC-6 (Central (CST))
  - Summer (DST): UTC-5 (CDT)
- Area codes: 715 & 534
- FIPS code: 55-72850
- GNIS feature ID: 1584132
- Website: https://townofsharon.wi.gov/

There is another Town of Sharon, in Walworth County.

Sharon is a town in Portage County, Wisconsin, United States. The population was 2,123 at the 2020 census. The unincorporated communities of Ellis, Little Waupon, North Star, and Polonia are located within the town.

== Geography ==
According to the United States Census Bureau, the town has a total area of 64.9 square miles (168 km^{2}), of which 64.3 square miles (167 km^{2}) is land and 0.6 square miles (1.6 km^{2}) (0.89%) is water.

== Demographics ==
As of the census of 2000, there were 1,936 people, 705 households, and 544 families residing in the town. The population density was 30.1 people per square mile (11.6 people/km^{2}). There were 754 housing units at an average density of 11.7 units per square mile (4.5 units/km^{2}). The racial makeup of the town was 99.12% White, 0.10% Native American, 0.26% Asian, 0.15% from other races, and 0.36% from two or more races. Hispanic or Latino of any race were 0.62% of the population.

There were 705 households, out of which 34.5% had children under the age of 18 living with them, 69.8% were married couples living together, 4.1% had a female householder with no husband present, and 22.8% were non-families. 17.2% of all households were made up of individuals, and 8.2% had someone living alone who was 65 years of age or older. The average household size was 2.75 and the average family size was 3.14.

In the town, the population was spread out, with 24.5% under the age of 18, 8.8% from 18 to 24, 28.5% from 25 to 44, 26.4% from 45 to 64, and 11.7% who were 65 years of age or older. The median age was 38 years. For every 100 females, there were 102.9 males. For every 100 females age 18 and over, there were 103.8 males.

The median income for a household in the town was $53,750, and the median income for a family was $58,478. Males had a median income of $38,011 versus $22,875 for females. The per capita income for the town was $20,760. About 2.7% of families and 5.7% of the population were below the poverty line, including 6.6% of those under age 18 and 12.1% of those age 65 or over.

== Notable people ==
- Michael J. Mersch, Wisconsin State Representative and building contractor, was born in the town
