= Almond, Wisconsin =

Village in the United States

- Village
- Motto: "Soar with eagle pride"
- Location within Portage County and Wisconsin

- Location within Wisconsin Location within the United States Location within North America
- Coordinates: 44°17′41″N 89°25′28″W
- Country: United States
- State: Wisconsin
- County: Portage

Area
  - Total: 1.05 sq mi (2.72 km^{2})
  - Land: 1.05 sq mi (2.71 km^{2})
  - Water: 0.0039 sq mi (0.01 km^{2})
- Elevation: 1,155 ft (352 m)

Population (2020)
  - Total: 424
  - Density: 405/sq mi (156/km^{2})
- Time zone: UTC-6 (CST)
  - Summer (DST): UTC-5 (CDT)
- Zip code: 54909
- Area code: 715 & 534
- FIPS code: 55-01425
- GNIS ID: 1582682
- Website: https://villageofalmondwi.gov/

Almond is a village in Portage County, Wisconsin, United States. The population was 424 at the 2020 census.

== History ==
Incorporated in 1905, the town originated when Jacob Meyers from the Mohawk Valley in New York started a stagecoach and freight route between Berlin and Stevens Point, Wisconsin. Because he needed a stop for the horses, he set up a barn and inn on the site of what is now Almond. The U.S. government signed a treaty with the Menominee Natives ceding land in central Wisconsin in 1848, which opened up the area to settlement. A post office was established on July 8, 1850, at the stagecoach stop. James F. Moore, a native of Almond, New York, became postmaster.

== Geography ==
Almond is located at 44°15′32″N 89°24′25″W.

According to the United States Census Bureau, the village has a total area of 1.01 square miles (2.62 km^{2}), all land.

== Demographics ==
Historical population
Census	Pop.	Note	%±
1910	487		—
1920	504		3.5%
1930	449		−10.9%
1940	449		0.0%
1950	435		−3.1%
1960	391		−10.1%
1970	440		12.5%
1980	477		8.4%
1990	455		−4.6%
2000	459		0.9%
2010	448		−2.4%
2020	424		−5.4%
U.S. Decennial Census

=== 2010 census ===
As of the census of 2010, there were 448 people, 174 households, and 119 families living in the village. The population density was 443.6 inhabitants per square mile (171.3/km^{2}). There were 197 housing units at an average density of 195.0 per square mile (75.3/km^{2}). The racial makeup of the village was 94.0% White, 0.2% African American, 0.4% Native American, 0.4% Asian, 3.8% from other races, and 1.1% from two or more races. Hispanic or Latino of any race were 13.2% of the population.

There were 174 households, of which 36.8% had children under the age of 18 living with them, 54.6% were married couples living together, 9.8% had a female householder with no husband present, 4.0% had a male householder with no wife present, and 31.6% were non-families. 27.0% of all households were made up of individuals, and 13.2% had someone living alone who was 65 years of age or older. The average household size was 2.57 and the average family size was 3.17.

The median age in the village was 35.3 years. 29.2% of residents were under the age of 18; 6.4% were between the ages of 18 and 24; 26.1% were from 25 to 44; 24.2% were from 45 to 64; and 14.1% were 65 years of age or older. The gender makeup of the village was 48.9% male and 51.1% female.

=== 2000 census ===
As of the census of 2000, there were 459 people, 189 households, and 126 families living in the village. The population density was 445.2 people per square mile (172.1/km^{2}). There were 199 housing units at an average density of 74.6 persons/km^{2} (193.0 persons/sq mi). The racial makeup of the village was 96.30% White, 0.22% African American, 0.22% Native American, 0.22% Asian, 0.22% Pacific Islander, 2.61% from other races, and 0.22% from two or more races. 7.19% of the population were Hispanic or Latino of any race.

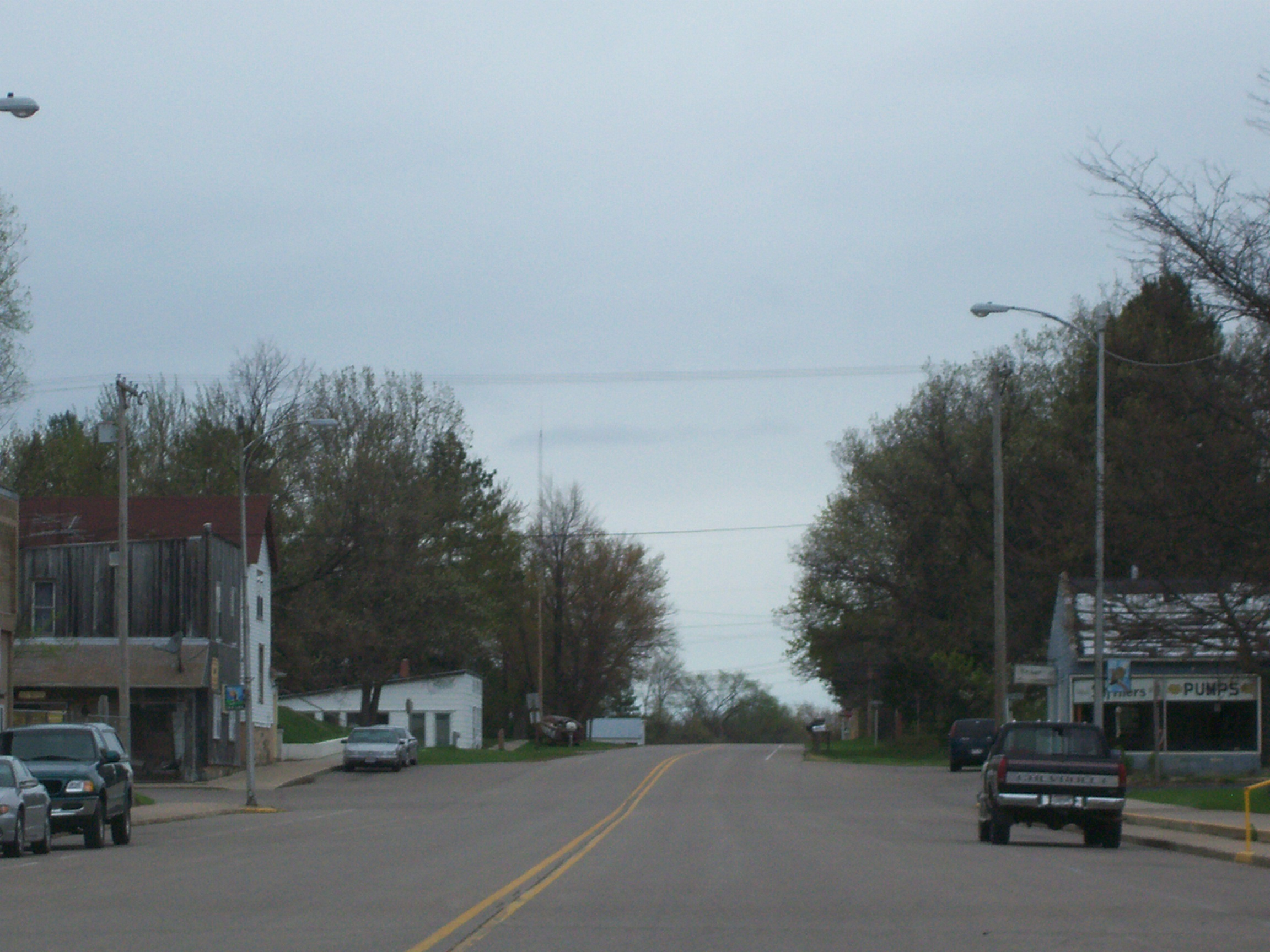
Downtown Almond

There were 189 households, out of which 32.3% had children under the age of 18 living with them, 48.7% were married couples living together, 13.2% had a female householder with no husband present, and 33.3% were non-families. 30.2% of all households were made up of individuals, and 17.5% had someone living alone who was 65 years of age or older. The average household size was 2.43 and the average family size was 3.00.

In the village, the population was spread out, with 26.1% under the age of 18, 10.2% from 18 to 24, 23.5% from 25 to 44, 24.2% from 45 to 64, and 15.9% who were 65 years of age or older. The median age was 36 years. For every 100 females, there were 92.9 males. For every 100 females age 18 and over, there were 82.3 males.

The median income for a household in the village was $37,857, and the median income for a family was $47,500. Males had a median income of $34,861 versus $20,972 for females. The per capita income for the village was $18,104. About 10.5% of families and 10.4% of the population were below the poverty line, including 19.7% of those under age 18 and 11.9% of those ages 65 or older.

== Education ==
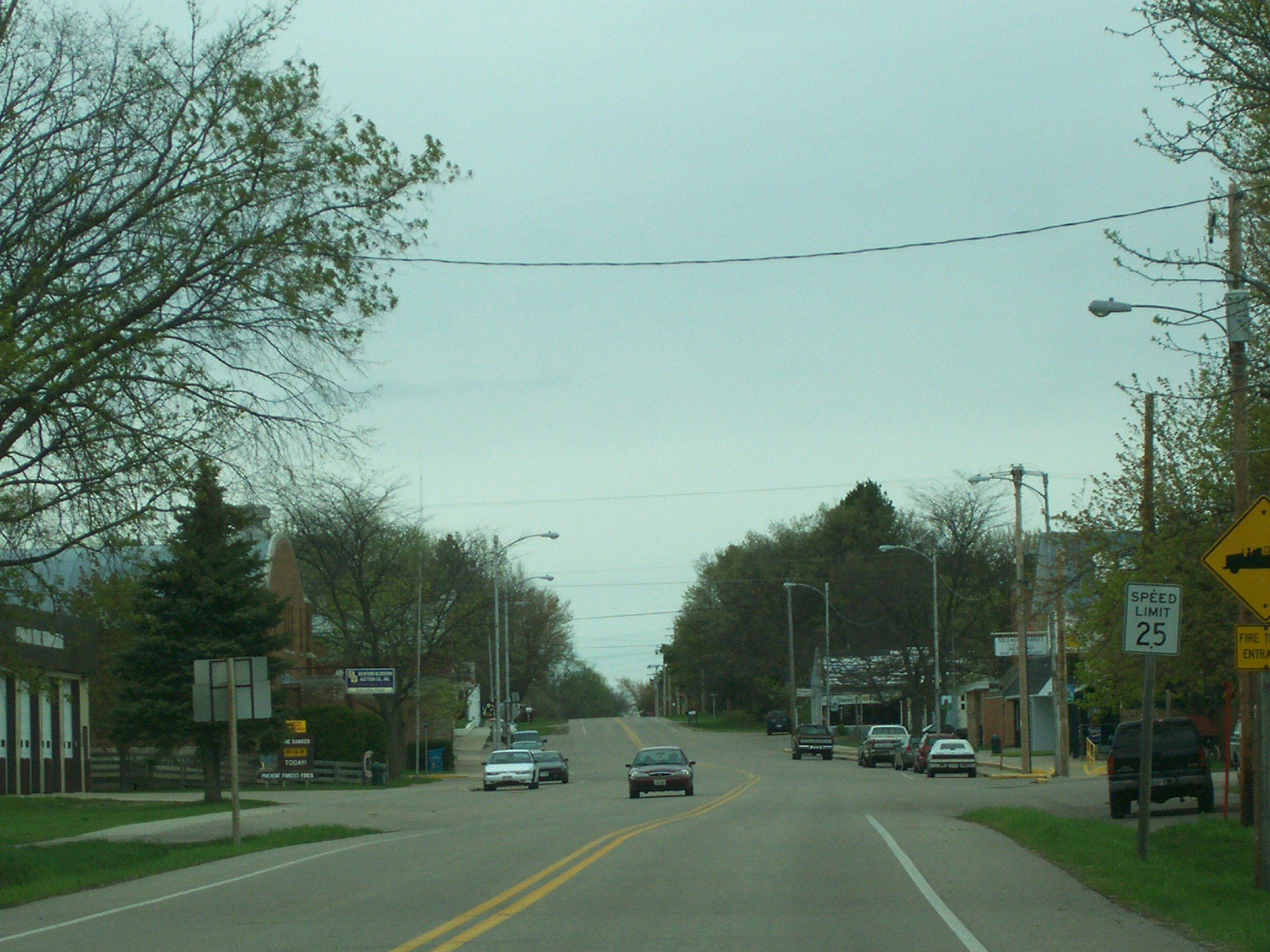
Downtown Almond

Almond is served by the Almond-Bancroft School District, which has an elementary, middle, and high school.

== Notable people ==
- Orestes A. Crowell, Wisconsin State Representative, farmer, and businessman, was born in Almond; Crowell was the first president of the village in 1905, when the village was incorporated.
- Henry Wellcome, founder of the Wellcome Trust, was born in Almond.

== See also ==
- List of villages in Wisconsin
