= Portage County, Wisconsin =

County in Wisconsin, United States

- County
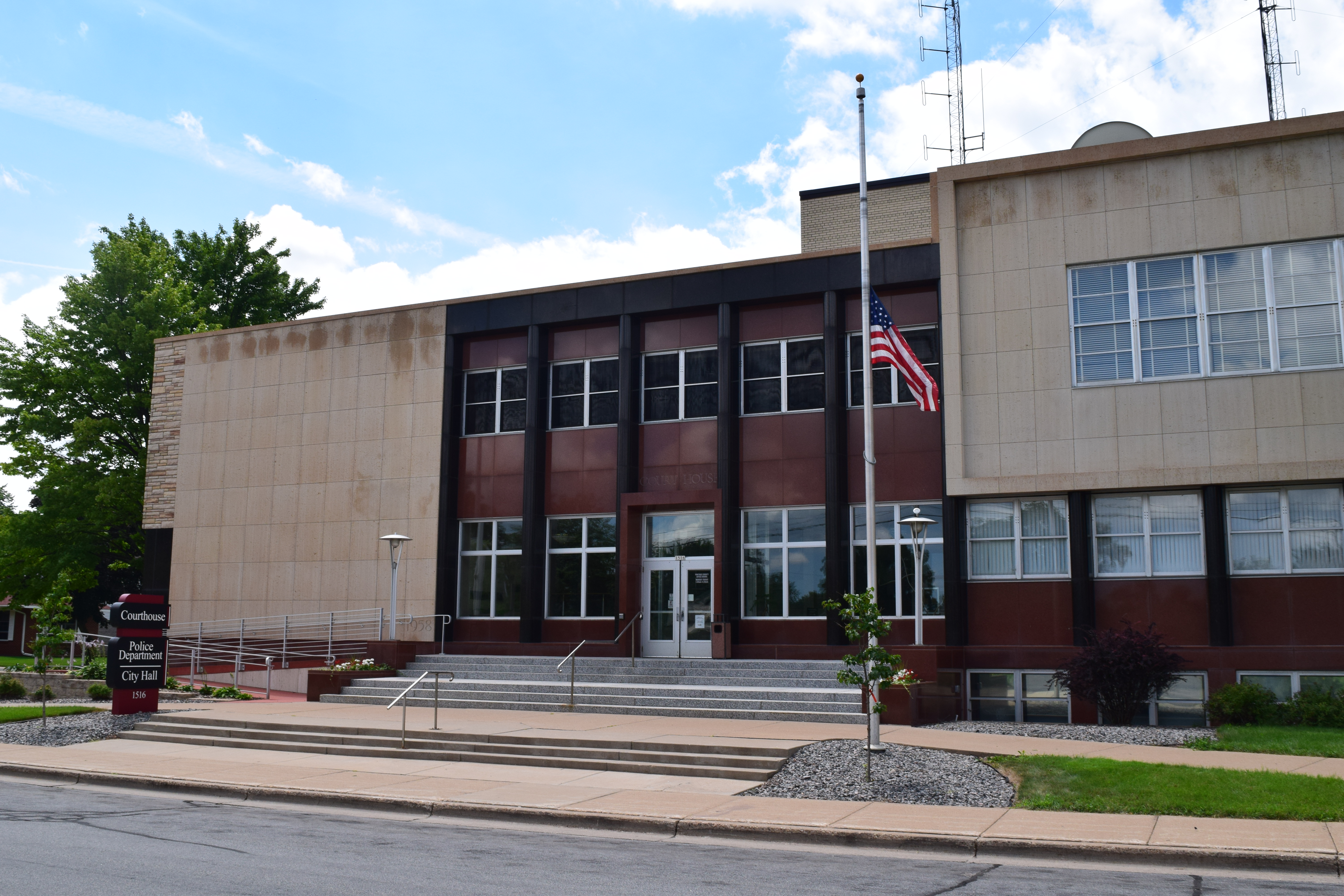
- Portage County Courthouse in Stevens Point

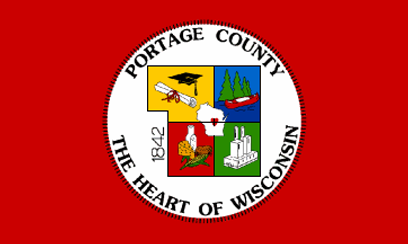
- Flag

- Location within the U.S. state of Wisconsin
- Coordinates: 44°29′N 89°30′W
- Country: United States
- State: Wisconsin
- Founded: 1844
- Named for: the portage between the Fox and Wisconsin Rivers
- Seat: Stevens Point
- Largest city: Stevens Point

Area
  - Total: 823 sq mi (2,130 km^{2})
  - Land: 801 sq mi (2,070 km^{2})
  - Water: 22 sq mi (57 km^{2}) 2.7%

Population (2020)
  - Total: 70,377
  - Estimate (2025): 71,943 ▲
  - Density: 87.9/sq mi (33.9/km^{2})
- Time zone: UTC−6 (Central)
  - Summer (DST): UTC−5 (CDT)
- Congressional district: 3rd
- Website: www.co.portage.wi.gov

Portage County is a county in the U.S. state of Wisconsin. As of the 2020 census, the population was 70,377. Its county seat is Stevens Point.

Portage County comprises the Stevens Point, WI Micropolitan Statistical Area and is included in the Wausau–Stevens Point–Wisconsin Rapids, WI Combined Statistical Area.

== History ==
Portage County was created from the Wisconsin Territory in 1836 and organized in 1844. Like the city of Portage, Portage County is named for the portage between the Fox and Wisconsin rivers; Portage County originally included the city of Portage and the portage for which it was named, but boundary changes detached the county from its namesake.

== Geography ==
According to the U.S. Census Bureau, the county has a total area of 823 square miles (2,130 km^{2}), of which 801 square miles (2,070 km^{2}) is land and 22 square miles (57 km^{2}) (2.7%) is water.

=== Major highways ===
- Interstate 39
- U.S. Highway 10
- U.S. Highway 51
- Highway 13 (Wisconsin)
- Highway 22 (Wisconsin)
- Highway 34 (Wisconsin)
- Highway 49 (Wisconsin)
- Highway 54 (Wisconsin)
- Highway 66 (Wisconsin)
- Highway 73 (Wisconsin)
- Highway 161 (Wisconsin)

=== Railroads ===
- Canadian National

=== Buses ===
- Stevens Point Transit

=== Airport ===
- KSTE – Stevens Point Municipal Airport

=== Adjacent counties ===
- Marathon County – north
- Shawano County – northeast
- Waupaca County – east
- Waushara County – southeast
- Adams County – southwest
- Wood County – west

=== Wildlife refuges ===
- Buena Vista Marsh
- Dewey Marsh
- Mead Wildlife Area
- Paul J. Olson Wildlife Area

== Demographics ==
Historical population
Census	Pop.	Note	%±
1840	1,623		—
1850	1,250		−23.0%
1860	7,507		500.6%
1870	10,634		41.7%
1880	17,731		66.7%
1890	24,798		39.9%
1900	29,483		18.9%
1910	30,945		5.0%
1920	33,649		8.7%
1930	33,827		0.5%
1940	35,800		5.8%
1950	34,858		−2.6%
1960	36,964		6.0%
1970	47,541		28.6%
1980	57,420		20.8%
1990	61,405		6.9%
2000	67,182		9.4%
2010	70,019		4.2%
2020	70,377		0.5%
2025 (est.)	71,943	▲	2.2%
U.S. Decennial Census; 1790–1960 1900–1990; 1990–2000 2010 2020

=== Racial and ethnic composition ===
Portage County, Wisconsin – Racial and ethnic composition Note: the US Census treats Hispanic/Latino as an ethnic category. This table excludes Latinos from the racial categories and assigns them to a separate category. Hispanics/Latinos may be of any race.
Race / ethnicity (NH = Non-Hispanic)	Pop 1980	Pop 1990	Pop 2000	Pop 2010	Pop 2020	% 1980	% 1990	% 2000	% 2010	% 2020
White alone (NH)	56,413	59,656	63,752	64,897	62,212	98.25%	97.15%	94.89%	92.68%	88.40%
Black or African American alone (NH)	108	152	203	362	903	0.19%	0.25%	0.30%	0.52%	1.28%
Native American or Alaska Native alone (NH)	166	236	214	222	242	0.29%	0.38%	0.32%	0.32%	0.34%
Asian alone (NH)	249	771	1,509	1,955	2,252	0.43%	1.26%	2.25%	2.79%	3.20%
Native Hawaiian or Pacific Islander alone (NH)	x	x	27	12	16	x	x	0.04%	0.02%	0.02%
Other race alone (NH)	37	18	29	35	142	0.06%	0.03%	0.04%	0.05%	0.20%
Mixed race or Multiracial (NH)	x	x	481	683	1,990	x	x	0.72%	0.98%	2.83%
Hispanic or Latino (any race)	447	572	967	1,853	2,620	0.78%	0.93%	1.44%	2.65%	3.72%
Total	57,420	61,405	67,182	70,019	70,377	100.00%	100.00%	100.00%	100.00%	100.00%

=== 2020 census ===
As of the 2020 census, the population was 70,377, the median age was 38.8 years, 19.7% of residents were under the age of 18, and 18.0% were 65 years of age or older. For every 100 females there were 100.9 males, and for every 100 females age 18 and over there were 99.7 males age 18 and over.

There were 29,138 households in the county, of which 24.7% had children under the age of 18 living in them. Of all households, 48.2% were married-couple households, 20.1% were households with a male householder and no spouse or partner present, and 23.2% were households with a female householder and no spouse or partner present. About 29.9% of all households were made up of individuals and 11.4% had someone living alone who was 65 years of age or older.

The population density was 87.9 people per square mile (33.9 people/km^{2}). There were 31,148 housing units at an average density of 38.9 units per square mile (15.0 units/km^{2}); 6.5% were vacant, 68.4% of occupied units were owner-occupied, and 31.6% were renter-occupied. The homeowner vacancy rate was 0.8% and the rental vacancy rate was 4.7%.

The racial makeup of the county was 89.5% White, 1.3% Black or African American, 0.4% American Indian and Alaska Native, 3.2% Asian, <0.1% Native Hawaiian and Pacific Islander, 1.3% from some other race, and 4.2% from two or more races. Hispanic or Latino residents of any race comprised 3.7% of the population.

63.4% of residents lived in urban areas, while 36.6% lived in rural areas.

2000 Census Age Pyramid for Portage County

=== 2000 census ===
As of the census of 2000, there were 67,182 people, 25,040 households, and 16,501 families residing in the county. The population density was 83 people per square mile (32 people/km^{2}). There were 26,589 housing units at an average density of 33 units per square mile (13 units/km^{2}). The racial makeup of the county was 95.73% White, 0.32% Black or African American, 0.36% Native American, 2.25% Asian, 0.04% Pacific Islander, 0.43% from other races, and 0.86% from two or more races. 1.44% of the population were Hispanic or Latino of any race. 32.8% were of Polish, 31.6% German, 5.4% Norwegian and 5.0% Irish ancestry. 93.9% spoke English, 1.7% Spanish, 1.6% Polish and 1.3% Hmong as their first language.

There were 25,040 households, out of which 32.10% had children under the age of 18 living with them, 55.10% were married couples living together, 7.30% had a female householder with no husband present, and 34.10% were non-families. 24.50% of all households were made up of individuals, and 8.80% had someone living alone who was 65 years of age or older. The average household size was 2.54 and the average family size was 3.07.

In the county, the population was spread out, with 24.10% under the age of 18, 16.20% from 18 to 24, 27.70% from 25 to 44, 21.10% from 45 to 64, and 10.90% who were 65 years of age or older. The median age was 33 years. For every 100 females there were 99.40 males. For every 100 females age 18 and over, there were 96.80 males.

In 2017, there were 674 births, giving a general fertility rate of 46.4 births per 1000 women aged 15–44, the third lowest rate out of all 72 Wisconsin counties.

== Communities ==
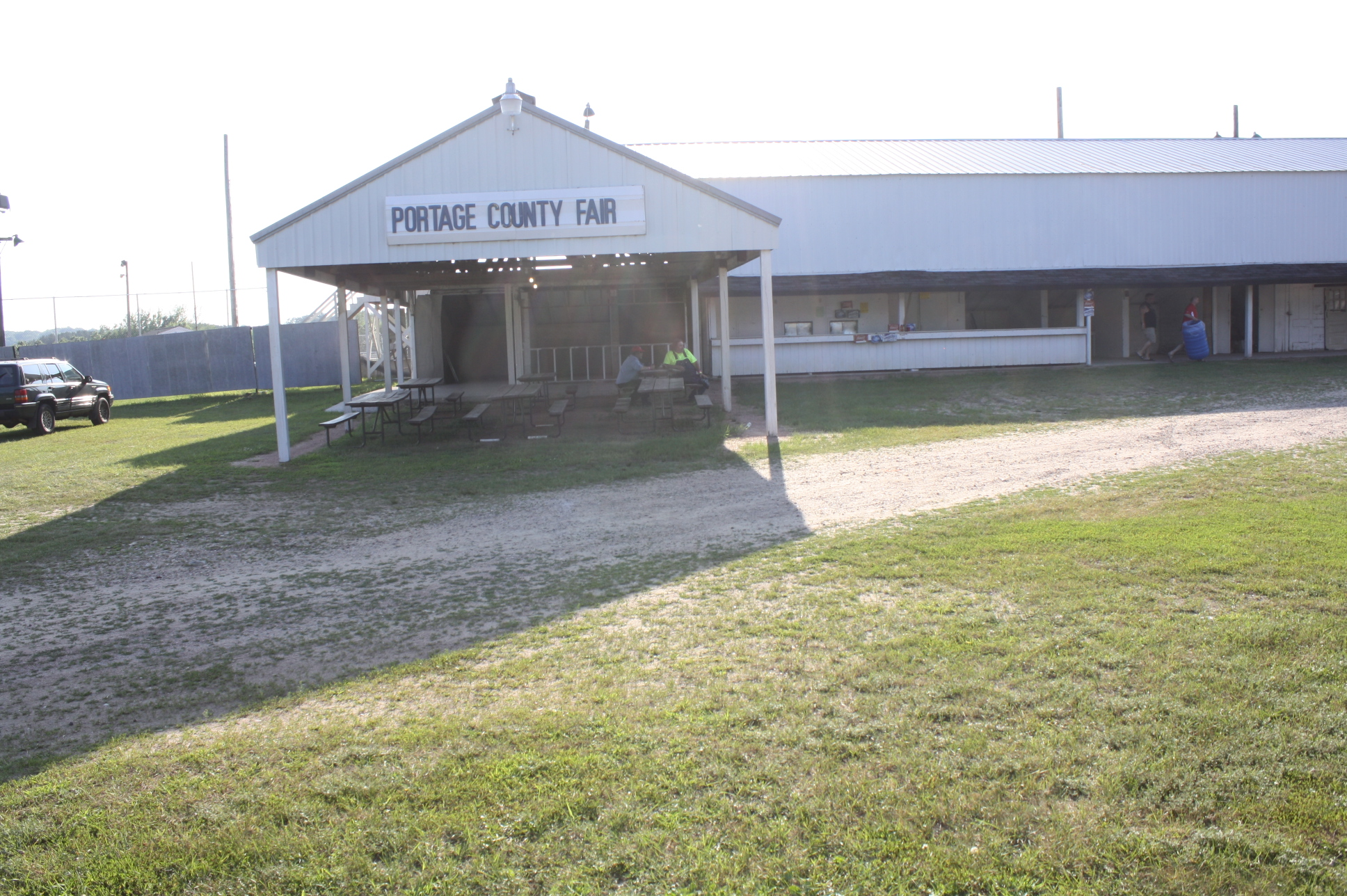
Fairgrounds

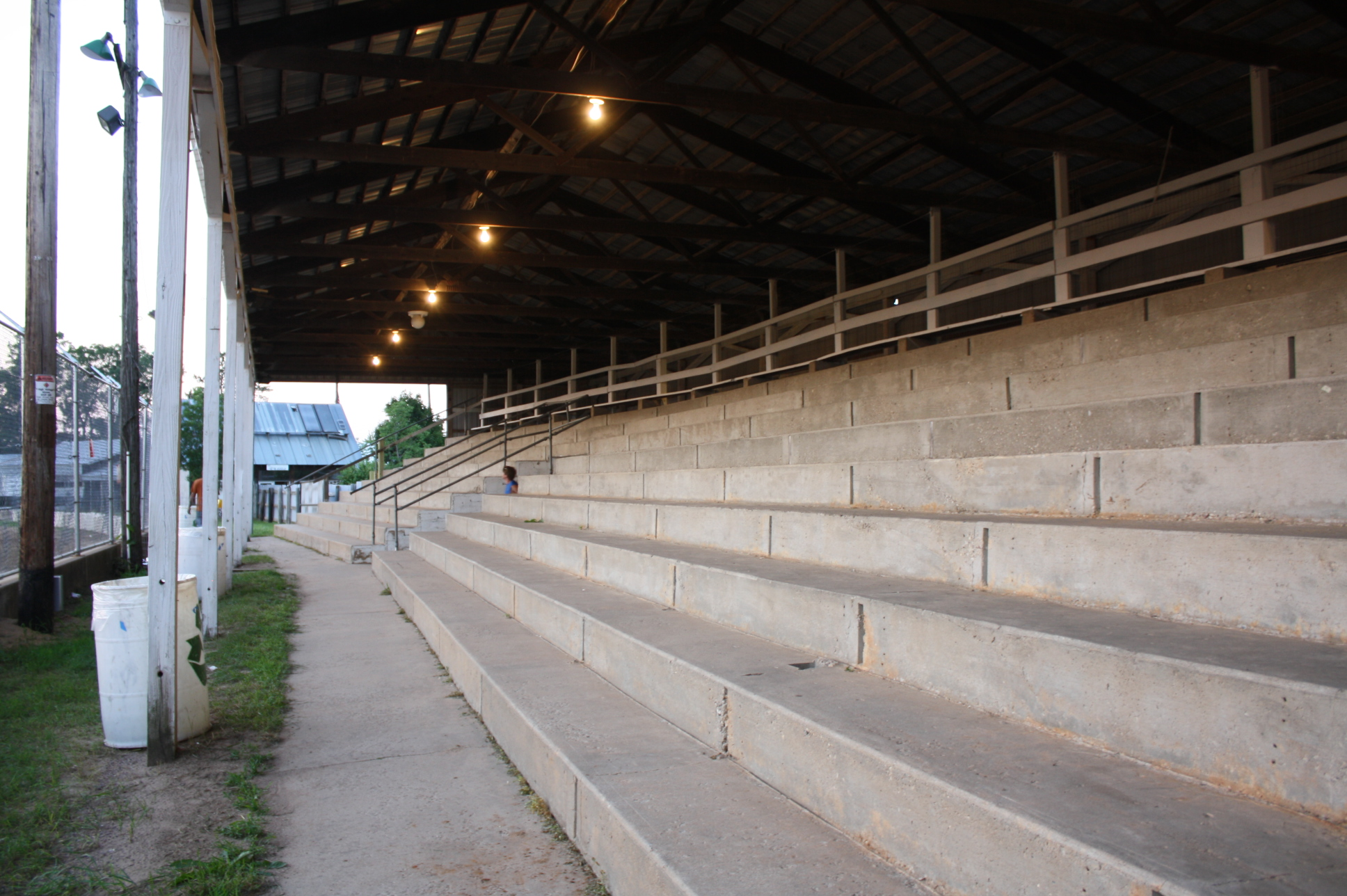
Grandstands at the county fairgrounds

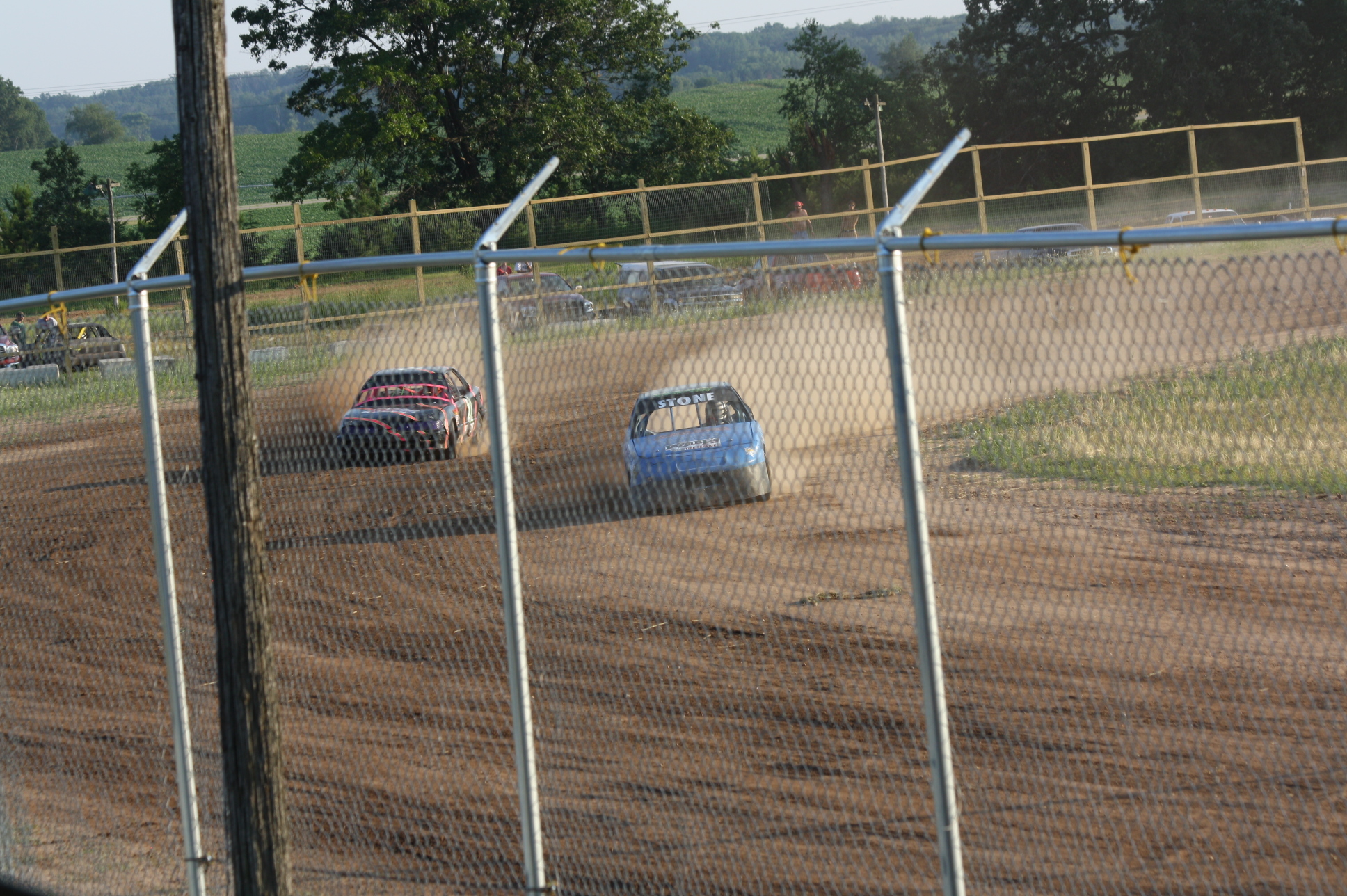
4 cylinder stock cars racing at the county fairgrounds

=== City ===
- Stevens Point (county seat)

=== Villages ===
- Almond
- Amherst
- Amherst Junction
- Junction City
- Milladore (mostly in Wood County)
- Nelsonville
- Park Ridge
- Plover
- Rosholt
- Whiting

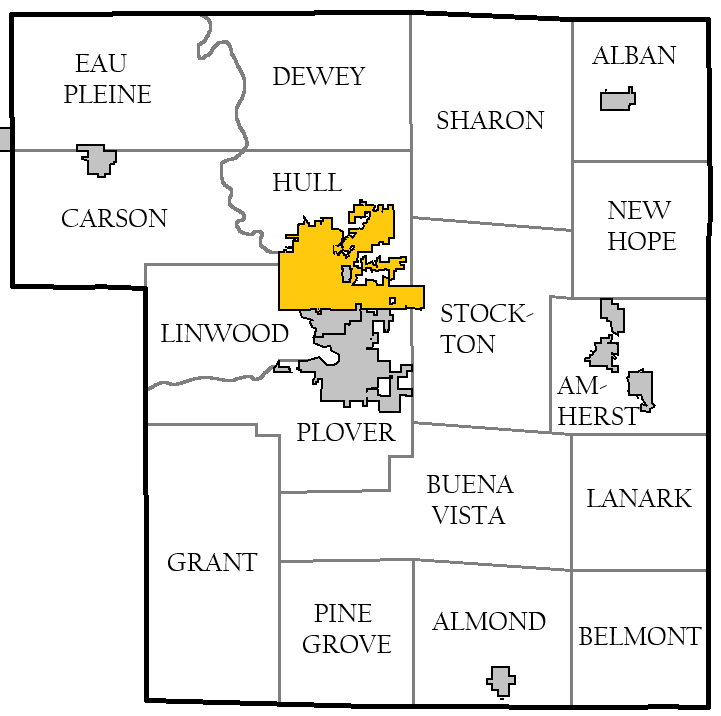
Towns of Portage County

=== Towns ===
- Alban
- Almond
- Amherst
- Belmont
- Buena Vista
- Carson
- Dewey
- Eau Pleine
- Grant
- Hull
- Lanark
- Linwood
- New Hope
- Pine Grove
- Plover
- Sharon
- Stockton

=== Census-designated places ===
- Bancroft
- Polonia

=== Unincorporated communities ===
- Alban
- Arnott
- Badger
- Blaine
- Casimir
- Coddington
- Custer
- Dopp
- Ellis
- Fancher
- Garfield
- Heffron (partial)
- Keene
- Kellner (partial)
- Little Waupon
- Jordan
- Meehan
- Mill Creek Community
- New Hope
- North Star
- Peru
- Rocky Run
- Stockton
- Torun
- West Almond
- West Bancroft

=== Ghost town/neighborhood ===
- Lake Emily

== Politics ==
United States presidential election results for Portage County, Wisconsin
Year	Republican		Democratic		Third party(ies)	
Year	No.	%	No.	%	No.	%
1892	2,291	44.75%	2,570	50.21%	258	5.04%
1896	3,537	53.81%	2,890	43.97%	146	2.22%
1900	3,285	54.60%	2,633	43.77%	98	1.63%
1904	3,633	61.09%	2,168	36.46%	146	2.46%
1908	3,269	56.42%	2,362	40.77%	163	2.81%
1912	1,932	36.37%	2,301	43.32%	1,079	20.31%
1916	2,520	44.52%	3,000	53.00%	140	2.47%
1920	5,527	65.39%	2,656	31.42%	269	3.18%
1924	2,854	27.76%	2,010	19.55%	5,416	52.68%
1928	5,161	43.03%	6,764	56.39%	70	0.58%
1932	3,434	26.79%	9,195	71.72%	191	1.49%
1936	3,969	26.74%	10,576	71.25%	299	2.01%
1940	5,670	35.63%	10,148	63.78%	94	0.59%
1944	5,405	38.27%	8,678	61.44%	42	0.30%
1948	5,424	39.33%	8,154	59.13%	213	1.54%
1952	8,499	52.83%	7,537	46.85%	51	0.32%
1956	8,320	54.08%	7,010	45.56%	56	0.36%
1960	6,436	37.92%	10,516	61.96%	20	0.12%
1964	4,579	27.75%	11,887	72.05%	32	0.19%
1968	6,180	36.10%	10,014	58.49%	927	5.41%
1972	9,346	40.04%	13,564	58.11%	431	1.85%
1976	9,520	36.28%	15,912	60.65%	805	3.07%
1980	10,465	34.09%	16,443	53.56%	3,794	12.36%
1984	13,605	48.28%	14,399	51.10%	175	0.62%
1988	12,057	42.25%	16,317	57.18%	161	0.56%
1992	10,914	32.37%	15,553	46.13%	7,249	21.50%
1996	9,631	32.18%	15,901	53.13%	4,396	14.69%
2000	13,214	39.14%	17,942	53.15%	2,604	7.71%
2004	16,546	42.47%	21,861	56.11%	554	1.42%
2008	13,810	35.03%	24,817	62.95%	795	2.02%
2012	16,615	42.24%	22,075	56.12%	647	1.64%
2016	17,305	44.84%	18,529	48.02%	2,755	7.14%
2020	19,299	47.53%	20,428	50.31%	876	2.16%
2024	20,987	48.52%	21,503	49.71%	768	1.78%

Portage County had been reliably Democratic in presidential elections since Dwight Eisenhower's win in 1956. Donald Trump came within 517 votes of winning the county in 2024, and gained support in each election from 2016-2024. The county is a battleground county, that has moved to the right in the Trump-era.

== See also ==
- National Register of Historic Places listings in Portage County, Wisconsin
