= Wisconsin's Portage County Assembly district =

Former American legislative district

Wisconsin's Portage County State Assembly district
- Obsolete
- Notes: 1848–1852; 1861–1896; 1902–1972

Wisconsin's Portage County Assembly district was a district in the Wisconsin State Assembly for most of the history of the state of Wisconsin, up to the legislative redistricting reforms of 1972 which created the current numbered districts. Located in central Wisconsin, the district comprised the whole of Portage County, Wisconsin, and was one of the 66 original Assembly districts defined in Article XIV of the Constitution of Wisconsin.

The district was in use for elections from 1848 through 1851, then from 1861 through 1896, and then again from 1902 until 1972. Prior to 1852, Portage County's boundaries shifted several times; when Wisconsin achieved statehood in 1848, Portage County comprised a fifty mile wide vertical strip from central Wisconsin up to the Michigan border, it shrunk as new counties were created, and as other county boundaries were changed by law. Some of those changes also affected the boundaries of the Assembly district, namely the enlargement of Columbia, Sauk, and Marquette counties. But the creation of Marathon and Adams counties did not alter the district boundaries. After the district's second creation, in 1861, it contained only the modern boundaries of Portage County.

== List of representatives ==
List of representatives from the Portage County district
| Member | Party | Residence | Term start | Term end | Leg. |
|---|---|---|---|---|---|
District created
| James M. Campbell | Whig | Stevens Point | June 5, 1848 | January 1, 1849 | 1st |
| John DeLany | Dem. | Plover | January 1, 1849 | January 7, 1850 | 2nd |
| Walter D. McIndoe | Whig | Wausau | January 7, 1850 | January 6, 1851 | 3rd |
| Thomas J. Morman | Dem. | Stevens Point | January 6, 1851 | January 5, 1852 | 4th |
| George W. Cate | Dem. | Amherst | January 5, 1852 | January 3, 1853 | 5th |
District abolished by 1852 Wisconsin Act 499; Portage and Marathon counties became the Marathon–Portage district Adams County became part of the Adams–Sauk district
District re-established by 1861 Wisconsin Act 216
| Alexander S. McDill | Rep. | Plover | January 6, 1862 | January 5, 1863 | 15th |
| Enoch Webster | Rep. | Amherst | January 5, 1863 | January 4, 1864 | 16th |
| John Phillips | Union | Stevens Point | January 4, 1864 | January 2, 1865 | 17th |
| Newton H. Emmons | Union | Stevens Point | January 2, 1865 | January 1, 1866 | 18th |
| James O. Raymond | Union | Plover | January 1, 1866 | January 7, 1867 | 19th |
| Thomas McDill | Union | Plover | January 7, 1867 | January 6, 1868 | 20th |
| Benjamin Burr | Dem. | Stevens Point | January 6, 1868 | January 4, 1869 | 21st |
| Frederick Huntley | Rep. | Buena Vista | January 4, 1869 | January 2, 1871 | 22nd 23rd |
| Thomas McDill | Rep. | Plover | January 2, 1871 | January 1, 1872 | 24th |
| Oliver Lamoreux | Dem. | Plover | January 1, 1872 | January 6, 1873 | 25th |
| David R. Clements | Rep. | Stevens Point | January 6, 1873 | January 4, 1875 | 26th 27th |
| George H. Guernsey | Rep. | Almond | January 4, 1875 | January 3, 1876 | 28th |
| Thomas Wesley Anderson | Rep. | Stevens Point | January 3, 1876 | January 1, 1877 | 29th |
| William Arnott | Rep. | Stockton | January 1, 1877 | January 7, 1878 | 30th |
| James Meehan | Gbk. | Linwood | January 7, 1878 | January 6, 1879 | 31st |
| Thomas McDill | Rep. | McDill | January 6, 1879 | January 3, 1881 | 32nd 33rd |
| James E. Rogers | Rep. | Stevens Point | January 3, 1881 | January 2, 1882 | 34th |
| Charles A. Lane | Rep. | Plover | January 2, 1882 | January 5, 1885 | 35th 36th |
| Albert W. Sanborn | Rep. | Stevens Point | January 5, 1885 | January 3, 1887 | 37th |
| Jerome Nelson | Rep. | Nelsonville | January 3, 1887 | January 7, 1889 | 38th |
| Edward McGlachlin | Rep. | Stevens Point | January 7, 1889 | January 5, 1891 | 39th |
| Charles Couch | Dem. | Amherst | January 5, 1891 | January 7, 1895 | 40th 41st |
| Herman H. Hoffman | Rep. | Amherst | January 7, 1895 | January 4, 1897 | 42nd |
District abolished by 1896 Wisconsin Special Session Act 1 Portage County divided into the Portage 1st and Portage 2nd districts
District re-established by 1901 Wisconsin Act 194
| Fred J. Carpenter | Rep. | Stevens Point | January 5, 1903 | January 4, 1909 | 46th 47th 48th |
| Orestes A. Crowell | Rep. | Almond | January 4, 1909 | January 6, 1913 | 49th 50th |
| Don C. Hall | Rep. | Stevens Point | January 6, 1913 | January 4, 1915 | 51st |
| Anton C. Krembs | Dem. | Stevens Point | January 4, 1915 | January 1, 1917 | 52nd |
| George D. Whiteside | Rep. | Plover | January 1, 1917 | January 6, 1919 | 53rd |
| Harold J. Week | Rep. | Stevens Point | January 6, 1919 | January 3, 1921 | 54th |
| William M. Scribner | Rep. | | January 3, 1921 | January 1, 1923 | 55th |
| Ben Halverson | Rep. | New Hope | January 1, 1923 | January 3, 1927 | 56th 57th |
| Michael J. Mersch | Dem. | Stevens Point | January 3, 1927 | January 5, 1931 | 58th 59th |
| John Kostuck | Prog.R. | Stevens Point | January 5, 1931 | January 7, 1935 | 60th 61st |
| John Kostuck | Prog. | Stevens Point | January 7, 1935 | January 4, 1943 | 62nd 63rd 64th 65th |
| John Kostuck | Dem. | Stevens Point | January 4, 1943 | January 2, 1961 | 66th 67th 68th 69th 70th 71st 72nd 73rd 74th |
| Norman Myhra | Dem. | Stevens Point | January 2, 1961 | January 2, 1967 | 75th 76th 77th |
| Leonard A. Groshek | Dem. | Stevens Point | January 2, 1967 | January 1, 1973 | 78th 79th 80th |
District abolished by 1971 Wisconsin Act 304; Portage County divided between the 70th and 71st Assembly districts
