= Oliver Lamoreux =

19th century American politician

Member of the Wisconsin State Assembly from the Portage district
- In office January 1, 1872 – January 6, 1873
- Preceded by: Thomas McDill
- Succeeded by: David R. Clements

District Attorney of Portage County, Wisconsin
- In office January 2, 1871 – January 6, 1873
- Preceded by: Miner Stroupe
- Succeeded by: Miner Stroupe
- In office 1862 – January 1865
- Preceded by: J. W. Van Myers
- Succeeded by: B. Brett

Personal details
- Born: April 22, 1824 Clockville, New York, U.S.
- Died: May 18, 1891 (aged 67) Plover, Wisconsin, U.S.
- Resting place: Plover Cemetery, Plover, Wisconsin
- Spouse: Elizabeth C. Hall (m. 1848–1891)
- Children: William O. Lamoreux^{(b. 1850; died 1907)}; Mary Elizabeth (Bean)^{(b. 1853; died 1914)}; Frank B. Lamoreux^{(b. 1855; died 1922)}; Charles A. Lamoreux^{(b. 1860; died 1924)}
- Relatives: Silas W. Lamoreux (brother); Clarence A. Lamoreux (nephew); Lawrence A. Lamoreux (grandnephew)

Oliver Horton Lamoreux or Lamoreaux (April 22, 1824 – May 18, 1891) was an American lawyer, politician, and Wisconsin pioneer. He was a member of the Wisconsin State Assembly, representing Portage County during the 1872 session. He was the brother of Silas W. Lamoreux, who served in the Assembly during the same session.

== Background ==
Lamoreux was born in Clockville in Madison County, New York, on April 22, 1824. He received a common school education and became a farmer; he came to Wisconsin in 1851 and settled at Stockton in Portage County. His parents and brother joined him in Portage County in 1852, although Silas moved to Dodge County two years later.

== Public office ==
Lamoreux served as chairman of Town of Stockton board of supervisors several times; indeed, in the first town meeting held in 1855 he was elected town chair without opposition, as well as justice of the peace. He was appointed undersheriff of Portage County in 1858, and deputy U. S. marshal in 1861. Lamoreux was appointed district attorney of Portage County in 1862, and elected to the same position at the subsequent general election.

During the American Civil War he was appointed as a clerk in the War Department in 1863, appointed a special land agent in 1864, and again elected district attorney of Portage County in 1870. In 1871, he was elected to the Assembly, receiving 727 votes to 658 for Republican John Phillips (Republican incumbent Thomas McDill was not a candidate for re-election). In the same election, his brother Silas was elected as a Democrat from Dodge County. Oliver was appointed to the standing committee on town and city organization.

Although his official profile listed his party affiliation as "Conservative" (the only one in either house of the legislature), he is listed in one table in the 1872 Wisconsin Blue Book as a Democrat alongside his brother. Nonetheless, official Wisconsin histories list him simply as "Conservative".

Neither brother was a candidate for re-election in 1872; Oliver was succeeded by Republican David R. Clements.

== After the Assembly ==
In 1880, Lamoreux was a member of the Portage County Board of Immigration. He died May 18, 1891, in Plover.
