= Herman H. Hoffman =

19th century American politician

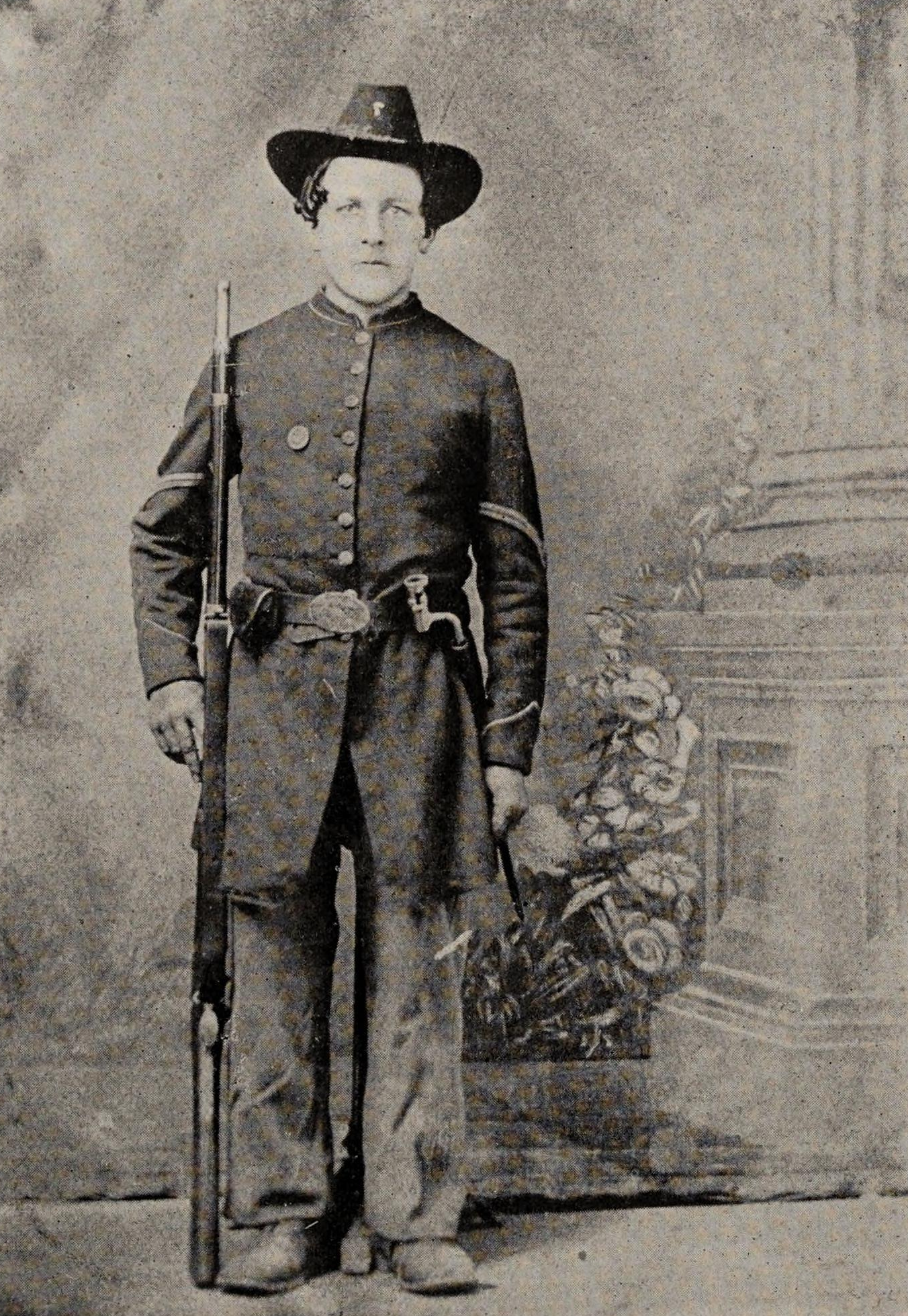
- Photo ca. February 1865; featured in A Standard History of Portage County, Wisconsin (1919)

Member of the Wisconsin State Assembly from the Portage district
- In office January 1895 – January 1897
- Preceded by: Charles Couch
- Succeeded by: Patrick H. Cashin (1st dist.); Peter N. Peterson (2nd dist.)

Personal details
- Born: April 1, 1844 Görlitz, Province of Silesia, Prussia
- Died: August 12, 1931 (aged 87) Amherst, Wisconsin, U.S.
- Resting place: Greenwood Cemetery, Amherst, Wisconsin
- Party: Republican
- Spouse: Margaretha M. Hoffman (m. 1867; died 1931)
- Children: William F. Hoffman^{(b. 1868; died 1896)}; Nettie R. (Tobie)^{(b. 1871; died 1951)}; Henry Herman Hoffman^{(b. 1880; died 1944)}; Ada Fredricka (Waller)^{(b. 1881; died 1971)}; Mary Sophia (Aldrich)^{(b. 1883; died 1941)}; Grant S. Hoffman^{(b. 1885; died 1904)}; Leslie L Hoffman^{(b. 1889; died 1952)}; Ruby H. (Peterson)^{(b. 1892; died 1960)}

Military service
- Allegiance: United States
- Branch/service: United States Volunteers; Union Army
- Years of service: 1864–1865
- Rank: Corporal, USV
- Unit: 7th Reg. Wis. Vol. Infantry
- Battles/wars: American Civil War

Herman H. Hoffman (April 1, 1844 – August 12, 1931) was a German American immigrant, farmer, and Republican politician. He served one term in the Wisconsin State Assembly, representing Portage County.

== Biography ==
Hoffman was born on April 1, 1844, in Görlitz, Prussia. During the American Civil War, he served with the 7th Wisconsin Infantry Regiment of the Union Army. On August 12, 1931, Hoffman died in Amherst, Wisconsin. A resolution was read by the Assembly in his honor following his death.

== Political career ==
Hoffman was a member of the Assembly during the 1895 session. Additionally, he was Supervisor and Chairman (similar to Mayor) of Amherst (town), Wisconsin and Village Supervisor and President (also similar to Mayor) of Amherst Junction, Wisconsin. He was a Republican.

Wisconsin State Assembly
Preceded by Charles Couch	Member of the Wisconsin State Assembly from the Portage district January 7, 1895 – January 4, 1897	Succeeded by Patrick H. Cashin (1st dist.); Peter N. Peterson (2nd dist.)
