= Wayne Township, Pennsylvania =

Wayne Township is the name of some places in the U.S. state of Pennsylvania:

- Wayne Township, Armstrong County, Pennsylvania
- Wayne Township, Clinton County, Pennsylvania
- Wayne Township, Crawford County, Pennsylvania
- Wayne Township, Dauphin County, Pennsylvania
- Wayne Township, Erie County, Pennsylvania
- Wayne Township, Greene County, Pennsylvania
- Wayne Township, Lawrence County, Pennsylvania
- Wayne Township, Mifflin County, Pennsylvania
- Wayne Township, Schuylkill County, Pennsylvania
