= Clarence A. Lamoreux =

American politician (1860-1945)

Member of the Wisconsin Senate from the 12th district
- In office January 4, 1897 – January 7, 1901
- Preceded by: Neal Brown
- Succeeded by: William O'Neil

Personal details
- Born: October 5, 1860 Portage County, Wisconsin, U.S.
- Died: December 5, 1945 (aged 85) Ashland County, Wisconsin, U.S.
- Resting place: Mount Hope Cemetery, Ashland, Wisconsin
- Party: Republican
- Spouses: Isabelle Lawrence (m. 1881; died 1926); Harriet A. Duerr (m. 1928; died 1936)
- Children: Lawrence A. Lamoreux; (b. 1899; died 1968)
- Relatives: Oliver Lamoreux (uncle); Silas W. Lamoreux (uncle)
- Profession: Lawyer, judge

Clarence A. Lamoreux (September 20, 1860 – December 5, 1945) was an American lawyer, judge, and Republican politician. He was a member of the Wisconsin State Senate, representing the 12th Senate district during the 1897 and 1899 sessions.

== Biography ==
Born in Portage County, Wisconsin, Lamoreux lived in Dodge County, Wisconsin from 1861 until 1880. He then moved to Cumberland, Wisconsin in 1880. He was admitted to the Wisconsin bar in 1881. Lamoreux was the editor of the Cumberland Herald newspaper from 1881 to 1884. He also served as postmaster for Cumberland, Wisconsin. Lamoreux moved to Ashland, Wisconsin and continued to practice law. From 1897 to 1901, Clarence Lamoreux served in the Wisconsin State Senate and was a Republican. Lamoreux also served as the Ashland County judge. Lamoreux died in a hospital in Ashland, Wisconsin from a heart ailment.

== Personal life and family ==
Clarence Lamoreux is a son of Martin Van Buren Lamoreux and his first wife, Mary Jane (née Higgins). Silas W. Lamoreux and Oliver Lamoreux were brothers of Martin Lamoreux.

Clarence Lamoreux married twice. He married Isabelle Lawrence in 1881. With Isabelle Lawrence, he had one son, Lawrence A. Lamoreux, who also went on to serve in the Wisconsin Assembly. Isabelle Lawrence died in 1926, and Clarence then married Hariet A. Duerr in 1928.

Wisconsin Senate
Preceded by Neal Brown	Member of the Wisconsin Senate from the 12th district January 4, 1897 – January 7, 1901	Succeeded by William O'Neil
