= Granville, Wisconsin =

Former community in Milwaukee County, Wisconsin

Granville
- Former Town
- Location within the state of Wisconsin
- Coordinates: 43°10′39″N 88°2′38″W
- Country: United States
- State: Wisconsin
- County: Milwaukee
- Time zone: UTC-6 (Central (CST))
  - Summer (DST): UTC-5 (CDT)

Granville was a town located in Milwaukee County, Wisconsin, United States. One portion was incorporated as the village of Brown Deer in 1955; the remainder consolidated with the City of Milwaukee in 1956, and became a neighborhood of Milwaukee.

== History ==
The first settlers came to the area in 1835, including some from Granville, New York, who gave the area its name. On January 13, 1840, the Town of Granville was created by the territorial legislature, encompassing a western portion of the Town of Milwaukee. As of the 1840 census, the population of the Town of Granville was 225.

Granville was settled in the late 1830s and 1840s by a group of Pennsylvania Dutch (German) immigrants who had formerly lived in Telford, Pennsylvania, led by Samuel Wambold. They dedicated a church building, the German Evangelical Lutheran and Reformed Church of Granville Township, on June 17, 1849. (The church is currently known as Salem Evangelical Lutheran Church.) On May 26, 1850, pastor Wilhelm Wrede hosted a meeting of local Lutheran ministers at the church: this group later became the Wisconsin Evangelical Lutheran Synod.

The area around Good Hope Road and 43rd Street was known as East Granville, and was home to the East Granville Cemetery which was started in the 1840s. The cemetery was moved by Brown Deer in 1969 to widen existing roads.

The area around Mill Road and 107th Street was known as West Granville, and was home to the German Lutherans mentioned above. The area was also home to the West Granville Cemetery which was started in 1853.

=== Separation, annexation, and consolidation with Milwaukee ===
The northeastern corner of the town was known as Brown Deer, and eventually became the incorporated Village of Brown Deer on January 20, 1955, after a court battle between area residents and the city of Milwaukee (which hoped to annex the area). The remainder was consolidated with the City of Milwaukee after referendums held in both jurisdictions on April 3, 1956 approved the move.

However, on July 12, 1956, the Town Board of Granville passed a motion to repeal the ordinance under which the April referendum had been held, and the matter ended up in the hands of the Wisconsin Supreme Court, which finally ruled that the consolidation had been lawfully approved and the Town of Granville had ceased to exist.

The final details of which portions were to go to Milwaukee and which to Brown Deer were not finally put to rest until April 1962, with one parcel of a quarter of a square miles going to Brown Deer.

== Geography ==
Granville was located at 43°10'39" North, 88°2'38" West (43.1775 -88.04389).

When it was first formed, Granville stretched from the western border of Milwaukee County at 124th Street to 27th Street on the east, and from the northern border of Milwaukee County at County Line Road to Hampton Avenue on the south.

== Demographics ==
The town had a population of 1,713 in 1850 and 2,431 in 1875.

== Education ==
Milwaukee Public Schools operates public schools in the area. Goodrich Elementary School, John Burroughs Middle School, and Harold S. Vincent High School serve the community.

Risen Savior Lutheran School, one of Milwaukee's highest performing schools, is located in the Granville neighborhood.

Granville Lutheran School, a private school operated by Lutheran Urban Mission Initiative (LUMIN) Schools, is in the area.

== Notable people ==
- Patrick H. Cashin, Wisconsin State Assemblyman and Mayor of Stevens Point, Wisconsin, was born in Granville.

== See also ==
- Neighborhoods of Milwaukee
