= George Davis McDill =

19th century American politician

George D. McDill

Member of the Wisconsin State Assembly
- In office January 1, 1883 – January 5, 1885
- Preceded by: District established
- Succeeded by: Frank Nye
- Constituency: Polk district
- In office January 3, 1881 – January 1, 1883
- Preceded by: Lars L. Gunderson
- Succeeded by: District abolished
- Constituency: Ashland–Barron–Bayfield–Burnett–Douglas–Polk district

District Attorney of Polk County, Wisconsin
- In office January 5, 1874 – January 7, 1878
- Preceded by: Samuel Thompson
- Succeeded by: Varnum M. Babcock

Personal details
- Born: July 28, 1838 Wayne Township, Crawford County, Pennsylvania, U.S.
- Died: June 15, 1899 (aged 60) Osceola, Wisconsin, U.S.
- Resting place: Mount Hope Cemetery, Osceola, Wisconsin
- Party: Republican
- Spouse: Emma Ankeny (m. 1871; died 1892)
- Children: James McDill^{(b. 1872; died 1874)}; Susan McDill^{(b. 1874; died 1896)}; Hugh McDill^{(b. 1876; died 1910)}; Alexander Stuart McDill^{(b. 1879)}; Ruth Emma McDill^{(b. 1881; died 1964)}; Gladys McDill^{(b. 1883)}; Mary Eliza (Thompson)^{(b. 1885)}; Ella (Dickinson)^{(b. 1888)}
- Parents: Hugh McDill (father); Jane (Davis) McDill (mother)
- Relatives: Alexander S. McDill (uncle); Thomas McDill (uncle)

Military service
- Allegiance: United States
- Branch/service: United States Volunteers; Union Army
- Years of service: 1861–1864
- Rank: 1st Lieutenant, USV
- Unit: 6th Reg. Wis. Vol. Infantry; 37th Reg. Wis. Vol. Infantry
- Battles/wars: American Civil War: Northern Virginia campaign; First Battle of Rappahannock Station; Second Battle of Bull Run; Maryland campaign; Battle of South Mountain; Battle of Antietam; Fredericksburg campaign; Battle of Fredericksburg; Mud March; Chancellorsville campaign; Battle of Chancellorsville; Gettysburg campaign; Battle of Gettysburg; Bristoe campaign; Battle of Mine Run; Siege of Petersburg; Battle of the Crater; Battle of Boydton Plank Road

George Davis McDill (July 28, 1838 – June 15, 1899) was an American lawyer and Republican politician. He served four years in the Wisconsin State Assembly, representing Polk County and surrounding areas. He also served four years as district attorney of Polk County and was chairman of the county board of supervisors. He served in the Iron Brigade of the Army of the Potomac through most of the American Civil War.

== Early life ==
McDill was born on July 28, 1838, in Wayne Township, Crawford County, Pennsylvania. When he was a toddler, he moved with his parents to Beloit, Wisconsin Territory, and then to De Soto, in Vernon County, Wisconsin.

== Civil War service ==
At the outbreak of the American Civil War, he joined up with a company of volunteers for service in the Union Army. His company was enrolled as Company I in the 6th Wisconsin Infantry Regiment in the summer of 1861. The 6th Wisconsin Infantry was organized into a brigade which became famous as the Iron Brigade of the Army of the Potomac, serving in the eastern theater of the war. McDill served with the regiment through the first three years of the war, fighting in some of the most important battles of the war, including Second Bull Run, Antietam, Chancellorsville, and Gettysburg.

In March 1864, he was commissioned as a second lieutenant and assigned to Company K of the newly-raised 37th Wisconsin Infantry Regiment. He was promoted to first lieutenant two months later. Serving with the 37th Infantry, he participated in the Siege of Petersburg and was wounded at the Battle of the Crater—named for the detonation of a sapper mine intended to undermine the Confederate defense line. He was designated for promotion to captain in September 1864 but was mustered out due to his wounds before the promotion was confirmed.

== Legal and political career ==
After the war, McDill studied law and was admitted to the bar at Prairie du Chien, Wisconsin, in 1870. In 1872 he established a legal practice in Polk County, Wisconsin, where he lived for most of the rest of his life. In 1873, he was elected district attorney of Polk County. He was re-elected in 1875. He also served five years as chairman of the Polk County Board of Supervisors.

McDill was a member of the Republican Party of Wisconsin, and was elected to the Wisconsin State Assembly in 1880 from the district comprising Polk, Ashland, Barron, Bayfield, Burnett, and Douglas counties. He was re-elected from that district in 1881. After redistricting and a constitutional amendment which changed legislative terms in 1882, he was elected to a two-year term from a new Assembly district comprising just Polk County. He was not a candidate for re-election in 1884.

His legal practice flourished in Polk County for the rest of his life. He died on June 15, 1899, at his home in Osceola, Wisconsin.

== Personal life and family ==
George Davis McDill was a grandson of James McDill, an Irish American immigrant who served in the Pennsylvania Militia during the War of 1812. George Davis' uncles, Alexander S. McDill and Thomas McDill were also prominent politicians in Wisconsin. Alexander McDill served a term in the United States House of Representatives; Thomas McDill served in the Wisconsin Assembly and served as a quartermaster in the Union Army.

George Davis McDill married Emma Ankeny on November 25, 1871. They had eight children together, though their first son, James, died in infancy.

== Electoral history ==
=== Wisconsin Assembly (1880, 1881, 1882) ===
Wisconsin Assembly, Ashland–Barron–Bayfield–Burnett–Douglas–Polk District Election, 1880
Party	Candidate	Votes	%	±%
General Election, November 2, 1880
Republican	George D. McDill	2,848	64.74%	
Democratic	Charles B. Marshall	1,551	35.26%	
Plurality		1,297	29.48%	
Total votes		4,399	100.0%	+45.90%
Republican hold				

Wisconsin Assembly, Ashland–Barron–Bayfield–Burnett–Douglas–Polk District Election, 1881
Party	Candidate	Votes	%	±%
General Election, November 8, 1881
Republican	George D. McDill (incumbent)	2,498	71.99%	+7.25%
Democratic	Frank M. Angel	972	28.01%	
Plurality		1,526	43.98%	+14.49%
Total votes		3,470	100.0%	-21.12%
Republican hold				

Wisconsin Assembly, Polk District Election, 1882
Party	Candidate	Votes	%	±%
General Election, November 7, 1882
Republican	George D. McDill	656	64.13%	
Democratic	Daniel Mears	292	28.54%	
Prohibition	C. H. Staples	75	7.33%	
Plurality		364	35.58%	
Total votes		1,023	100.0%	
Republican win (new seat)				

Wisconsin State Assembly
Preceded by Lars L. Gunderson	Member of the Wisconsin State Assembly from the Ashland–Barron–Bayfield–Burnett–Douglas–Polk district January 3, 1881 – January 1, 1883	District abolished
District established	Member of the Wisconsin State Assembly from the Polk district January 1, 1883 – January 5, 1885	Succeeded by Frank Nye
Legal offices
Preceded by Samuel Thompson	District Attorney of Polk County, Wisconsin; January 5, 1874 – January 7, 1878	Succeeded by Varnum M. Babcock
