= Silas W. Lamoreux =

19th century American politician

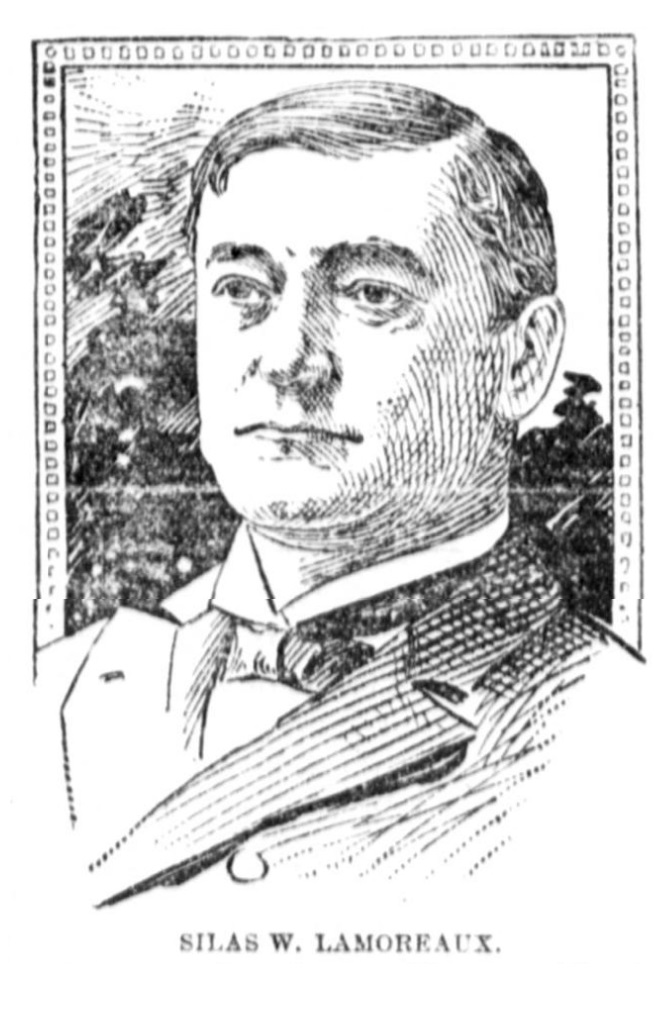

28th Commissioner of the General Land Office
- In office March 28, 1893 – March 25, 1897
- Appointed by: Grover Cleveland
- Preceded by: William M. Stone
- Succeeded by: Binger Hermann

County Judge of Dodge County, Wisconsin
- In office January 1, 1878 – March 28, 1893
- Preceded by: Edward Elwell
- Succeeded by: John G. Bachhuber

Member of the Wisconsin State Assembly from the Dodge 4th district
- In office January 1, 1872 – January 6, 1873
- Preceded by: Marcus Trumer
- Succeeded by: Dennis Short

Personal details
- Born: March 8, 1843 Lenox, New York, U.S.
- Died: August 5, 1909 (aged 66) Beaver Dam, Wisconsin, U.S.
- Resting place: Oakwood Cemetery, Beaver Dam
- Party: Democratic
- Spouse: Harriet Adelia Cobb (died 1914)
- Children: 4
- Relatives: Oliver Lamoreux (brother); Clarence A. Lamoreux (nephew); Lawrence A. Lamoreux (grandnephew)

Military service
- Allegiance: United States
- Branch/service: United States Volunteers; Union Army
- Years of service: 1864–1865
- Rank: Private, USV
- Unit: 5th Reg. Wis. Vol. Infantry
- Battles/wars: American Civil War

Silas Wright Lamoreux or Lamoreaux (March 8, 1843 – August 5, 1909) was an American lawyer from Wisconsin who served as a member of the Wisconsin State Assembly and as the 28th Commissioner of the General Land Office of the United States.

He was the brother of Oliver Lamoreux, who served in the same session of the Wisconsin Assembly.

== Biography ==
Lamoreux was born in Lenox, New York, on March 8, 1843, and came to Plover, Wisconsin, in 1852 with his family to join his older brother Oliver, who had moved to Wisconsin the year before. The family relocated to Mayville, Wisconsin, a year later. He moved to Dodge County, Wisconsin, and was admitted to the bar at age 21. He enlisted in the Union Army in 1864, and participated with the Army of the Potomac during the American Civil War.

Lamoreux was elected as a Democratic member of the Wisconsin State Assembly from the 5th Dodge County district in 1871. In the same election, his brother was elected from Portage County. He did not run for re-election in 1872.

Lamoreux was elected judge in his county in 1877. He was appointed commissioner of the United States General Land Office by President Grover Cleveland (a Democrat), serving from 1893 to 1897.

Lamoreux founded the Beaver Dam Malleable Iron Works, which employed 750 men at the time of his death. He also was president of the German National Bank of Beaver Dam. He died of blood poisoning in Beaver Dam on August 5, 1909, after a long history of diabetes.

Wisconsin State Assembly
Preceded by Marcus Trumer	Member of the Wisconsin State Assembly from the Dodge 4th district January 1, 1872 – January 6, 1873	Succeeded by Dennis Short
Government offices
Preceded by William M. Stone	Commissioner of the General Land Office; March 28, 1893 – March 25, 1897	Succeeded by Binger Hermann
Legal offices
Preceded by Edward Elwell	County Judge of Dodge County, Wisconsin; January 1, 1878 – March 28, 1893	Succeeded by John G. Bachhuber
