= Leonard A. Groshek =

American politician (1913–1988)

- Groshek, circa 1973

Member of the Wisconsin State Assembly
- In office January 1, 1973 – January 1, 1979
- Preceded by: District established
- Succeeded by: David Helbach
- Constituency: 71st district
- In office January 2, 1967 – January 1, 1973
- Preceded by: Norman Myhra
- Succeeded by: District abolished
- Constituency: Portage County district

Personal details
- Born: June 13, 1913 Stockton, Wisconsin, U.S.
- Died: January 21, 1988 (aged 74) Stevens Point, Wisconsin, U.S.
- Resting place: Saint Mary of Mount Carmel Catholic Cemetery, Fancher, Wisconsin
- Party: Democratic
- Spouses: Loretta B. Mrochinski (m. 1936; died 1965); Regina T. (Kirschling) Ostrowski (m. 1968–1988)
- Children: 3 children, 2 stepchildren
- Occupation: Small business owner, politician

Leonard A. Groshek (June 13, 1913 – January 21, 1988) was an American small business owner and Democratic politician from Stevens Point, Wisconsin. He served 12 years in the Wisconsin State Assembly, representing Portage County from 1967 to 1979. He served as chairman of the Assembly Transportation Committee, and was influential in Wisconsin highway planning in the 1970s.

== Biography ==
Born in the town of Stockton, Wisconsin, Groshek received his teachers certificate at University of Wisconsin–Stevens Point. He was a teacher, farmer, retail merchant, insurance agent, and factory worker. Groshek served in the town government. He served in the Wisconsin State Assembly as a Democrat. He died on January 21, 1988.

Wisconsin State Assembly
| Preceded by Norman Myhra | Member of the Wisconsin State Assembly from the Portage County district January 2, 1967 – January 1, 1973 | District abolished |
| District created by 1971 Wisc. Act 304 | Member of the Wisconsin State Assembly from the 71st district January 1, 1973 – January 1, 1979 | Succeeded by David Helbach |
