= Meehan, Wisconsin =

- Unincorporated community
- Location within Wisconsin Location within the United States
- Coordinates: 44°26′10″N 89°38′50″W
- Country: United States
- State: Wisconsin
- County: Portage
- Elevation: 1,066 ft (325 m)
- Time zone: UTC-6 (Central (CST))
  - Summer (DST): UTC-5 (CDT)
- Area codes: 715 and 534
- GNIS feature ID: 1569314

Meehan is an unincorporated community located in the town of Plover, Portage County, Wisconsin, United States. Meehan is located along Wisconsin Highway 54 and the Canadian National Railway, 5.3 miles (8.5 km) west-southwest of Plover.

== Notable locals ==
- James Meehan, lumberman and member of the Wisconsin State Assembly. It is unclear whether the settlement was named after him.
