= Arnott, Wisconsin =

- Unincorporated community
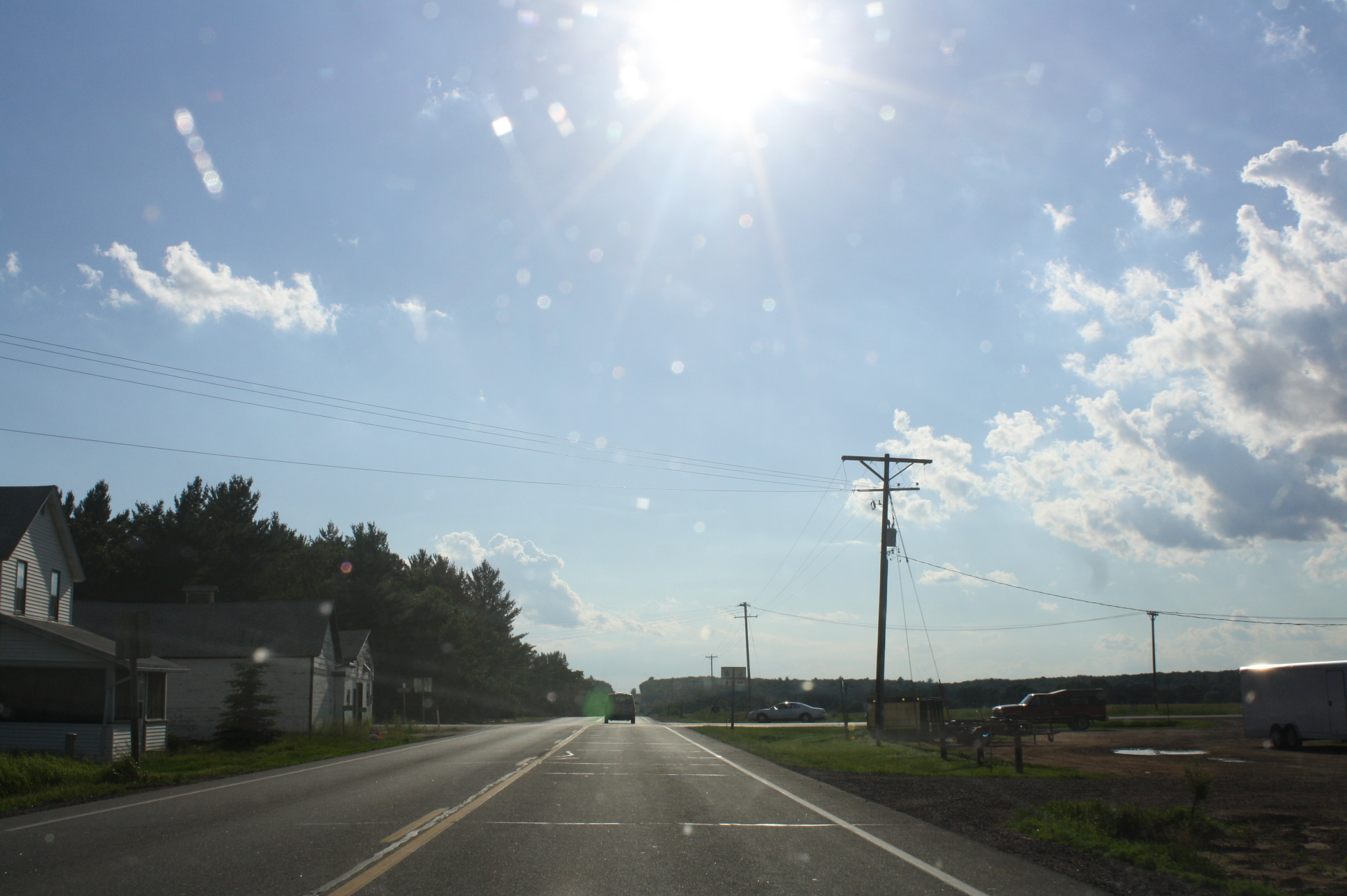
- Looking west at Arnott

- Location within Wisconsin Location within the United States
- Coordinates: 44°27′26″N 89°26′48″W
- Country: United States
- State: Wisconsin
- County: Portage
- Elevation: 1,152 ft (351 m)
- Time zone: UTC-6 (Central (CST))
  - Summer (DST): UTC-5 (CDT)
- Area codes: 715 and 534
- GNIS feature ID: 1560954

Arnott is an unincorporated community located in Stockton, Portage County, Wisconsin, United States. It is situated at the intersection of County Hwys. B and J.

== History ==
Arnott, ca. 1900.

In 1872, the Green Bay and Western Railroad laid tracks through a portion of Arnott. During 1881 and 1882, William Arnott, Joseph Bremmer, and Calvin Richmond canvassed the countryside, raising money to build a railroad depot. The depot and the settlement around it were named after Arnott, a local farmer who served as chairman of the town of Stockton and the Portage County Board and who was elected to the Wisconsin Legislature in 1876.

== Geography ==
Arnott is located in central Wisconsin, approximately four miles east of Plover, four miles south-southwest of Custer, and seven miles west of Amherst (Lat: 44° 27' 26.0", Lon: -89° 26' 48.5").

== Economy ==
Arnott has one tavern, a feed mill, a lawn equipment dealer, and an egg roll factory. It is a stopover for the Tomorrow River Trail, a former railroad grade turned into a walking path and snowmobile trail.

Arnott is near the Wimme Sand & Gravel Pit, Milestone Materials' gravel pit, American Asphalt's Custer Road plant, and a traffic safety/road marking company.

== Notable people ==
- Charles Page, philanthropist
