= Frederick Huntley =

19th century American politician

Member of the Wisconsin State Assembly from the Portage County district
- In office January 4, 1869 – January 2, 1871
- Preceded by: Benjamin Burr
- Succeeded by: Thomas McDill

Personal details
- Born: October 9, 1825 Salina, New York, U.S.
- Died: May 12, 1907 (aged 81) Buena Vista, Portage County, Wisconsin, U.S.
- Resting place: Liberty Corners Cemetery, Keene, Wisconsin
- Party: Republican
- Spouse: Adeliza "Eliza" Powers (m. 1844; died 1903)
- Children: Harriet A. (Miner)^{(b. 1844; died 1931)}; Fred H. Huntley^{(b. 1855; died 1918)}; Frank E. Huntley^{(b. 1861; died 1940)}
- Occupation: Farmer, minister

Frederick Huntley (October 5, 1825 – May 12, 1907) was an American farmer, Methodist minister, Republican politician, and Wisconsin pioneer. He was a member of the Wisconsin State Assembly, representing Portage County during the 1869 and 1870 terms.

== Biography ==
Frederick Huntley was born in Onondaga County, New York, in October 1825. As a child, he moved with his parents to Nottawa Township, St. Joseph County, Michigan, where he rose to adulthood and started a farm.

In 1851, he decided to seek his fortune in the California gold rush, and traveled to California via Panama. He had little success, and after two years, he sailed back to the eastern states, going via Cape Horn at the southern tip of South America.

In 1855, he set out for the new state of Wisconsin and claimed 160 acres of government land in the town of Buena Vista, Portage County, Wisconsin. After constructing a log house, he summoned his family from Michigan in the spring of 1856. Over time, Huntley expanded his land holdings, becoming one of the largest landowners in that township.

Huntley became active in politics with the Republican Party, and was elected to two consecutive terms in the Wisconsin State Assembly, representing Portage County during the 1869 and 1870 terms. He was also appointed postmaster at Buena Vista, serving in that capacity for 20 years, and served 16 years as chairman of the town board.

In 1876, Huntley was ordained as a minister in the Methodist church, and took a leading role in religious affairs in the community for much of the rest of his life.

He died at his homestead in Buena Vista on May 12, 1907.

Wisconsin State Assembly
Preceded by Benjamin Burr	Member of the Wisconsin State Assembly from the Portage County district January 4, 1869 – January 2, 1871	Succeeded by Thomas McDill
