= Gerhard Melvin Dahl =

American financier (1876–1953)

Gerhard Melvin Dahl (June 8, 1876 – December 29, 1953) was an American financier.

He was born in Fort Howard, Brown County, Wisconsin, to Theodor Halvorson Dahl, a Lutheran minister, and Rebekka Oline (Gjertsen) Dahl, who immigrated from Norway in 1865. Dahl was a graduate of the University of Wisconsin. He served as City Attorney and later was elected District Attorney in Portage County, Wisconsin. On June 5, 1900, Dahl married his first wife, Georgeana (Cate) Dahl, the youngest daughter of Judge George Washington Cate of Stevens Point, Portage County, Wisconsin, who served one term in the U.S. House of Representatives as a Democrat. In 1902, the Dahls suffered the loss of their only child, George Theodore Dahl, before his first birthday.

In 1910, Dahl was appointed Street Railroad Commissioner in Cleveland, Ohio. In 1912, he went to work for Sidney V. Mitchell as vice president of the Electric Bond and Share Company (engaged in financing and managing public utilities in many states). On January 1, 1917, Dahl became a vice president of Chase National Bank in New York City. In that position, he led the three-year successful reorganization of the New Orleans Railway and Light Company.

The Brooklyn-Manhattan Transit Corporation (BMT) in New York was set up in 1923 with Dahl as its chairman. He was originally a member of the Brooklyn Rapid Transit Company (BRT) reorganization committee when William S. Menden was president. Their goal was to re-vitalize the BMT, improve service, improve its public image, and enhance shareholder value. Dahl was chairman of the board of BMT from 1924 to 1943. For many years Dahl and NYC Mayor John Hylan feuded about transit issues in a bitter, personal and public way. There are many articles in New York papers about this feud. Dahl published the book, Transit Truths, in 1924 to educate the public about the issues.

Dahl became a millionaire as chairman of BMT and was on the board of directors of dozens of corporations. He and his wife Georgeana lived in the Ritz Tower Apartment Hotel in New York City, located at the crossroads of the Upper East Side (corner of 57th Street and Park Avenue) where exclusive shops and artistic enterprises on 57th met luxury apartment buildings on Park Avenue. The Ritz-Carlton Company managed the building and its restaurants. The Dahls wintered in Palm Beach, Florida (traveling back and forth in a private railroad car) and entertained lavishly at the Whitehall luxury hotel. They maintained a yacht in Florida, an estate in Smithtown on Long Island worth $500,000.00, belonged to several golf, tennis and yacht clubs, and raised horses and Great Dane dogs.

On February 8, 1924, the body of 26-year-old musician and aspiring actress Louise Lawson, a flapper originally from Walnut Springs, Texas, was discovered in her apartment, murdered by suffocation. The detectives found expensive furniture, a healthy bank account and a framed picture of a man identified as Gerhard Dahl. He did know her and her parents in connection with supporting her musical career. Louise was known to several prominent New Yorkers. Dahl offered to cooperate with the investigation and was never further implicated in her death by any prosecution.

In the late 1920s, Dahl took to gambling and joined the Sons of Hope (always hoping to improve their hands), a group of prominent wealthy men who met to drink and gamble. The table limit was $2,000.00. In John F. Kennedy’s book, Why England Slept, he described an epic poker battle between Dahl and New York journalist Herbert Bayard Swope as “a battle to the death between the two greatest extraverts of the Western World.” At this time in his life, his assets were worth about $5,000,000.00. Frederick K. Strauss, a man of Wall Street, once told a mutual friend, “In dealing with him (Dahl), you are dealing with the most arrogant man in New York.”

Around the time of the stock market crash and into the Great Depression, Dahl had huge loans with Chase National Bank, at one time reaching $4,758,000.00. On June 15, 1932, he owed Chase $3,183,358.19 which was written down to $615,000.00. Chase National Bank held Dahl’s BMT stock as collateral. In early June 1932, Chase sold 55,000 of those shares before the price dropped drastically. This was before insider stock trading became illegal. Dahl was innocent and in fact protested against the sale, but Albert H. Wiggin, President of Chase, was also part of BMT and used the insider information to maximize their stock sale value. (See The causes of the 1929 stock market crash: a speculative orgy or a new era? by Harold Bierman and Privileged Characters book by Morris Robert Werner.)

After the death of his wife in 1949, Dahl became addicted to alcohol and barbiturates. His world collapsed until he had about $10.50 in the bank and he checked himself into Bellevue Hospital to kick the habits at age 74. Dahl married a second time to Mary E. Echevarria in 1952.

Dahl died at Brooklyn Hospital on December 29, 1953. A private funeral was held for him two days later in Manhattan.
