= 1903 United States Senate election in Wisconsin =

- January 28, 1903
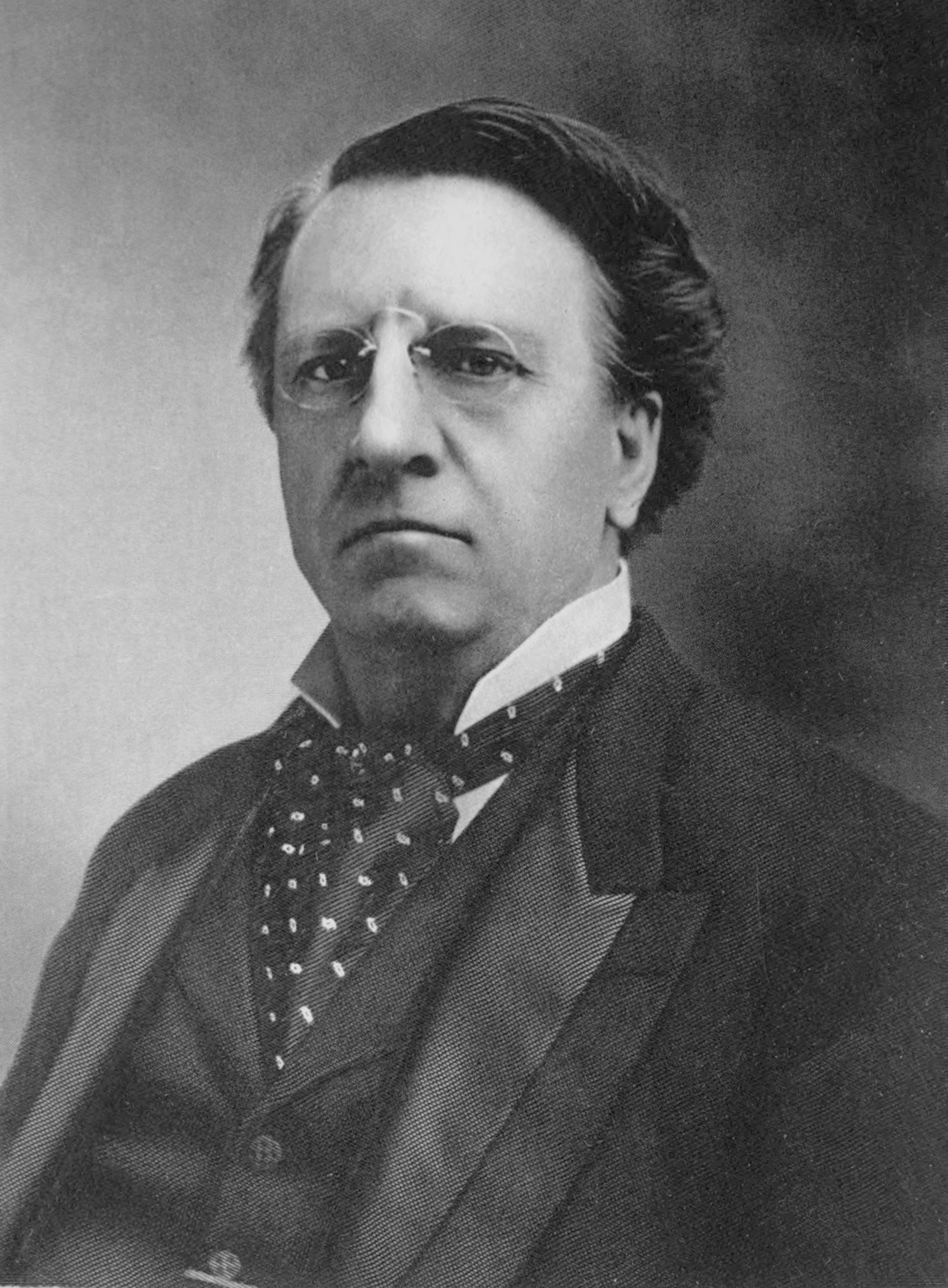

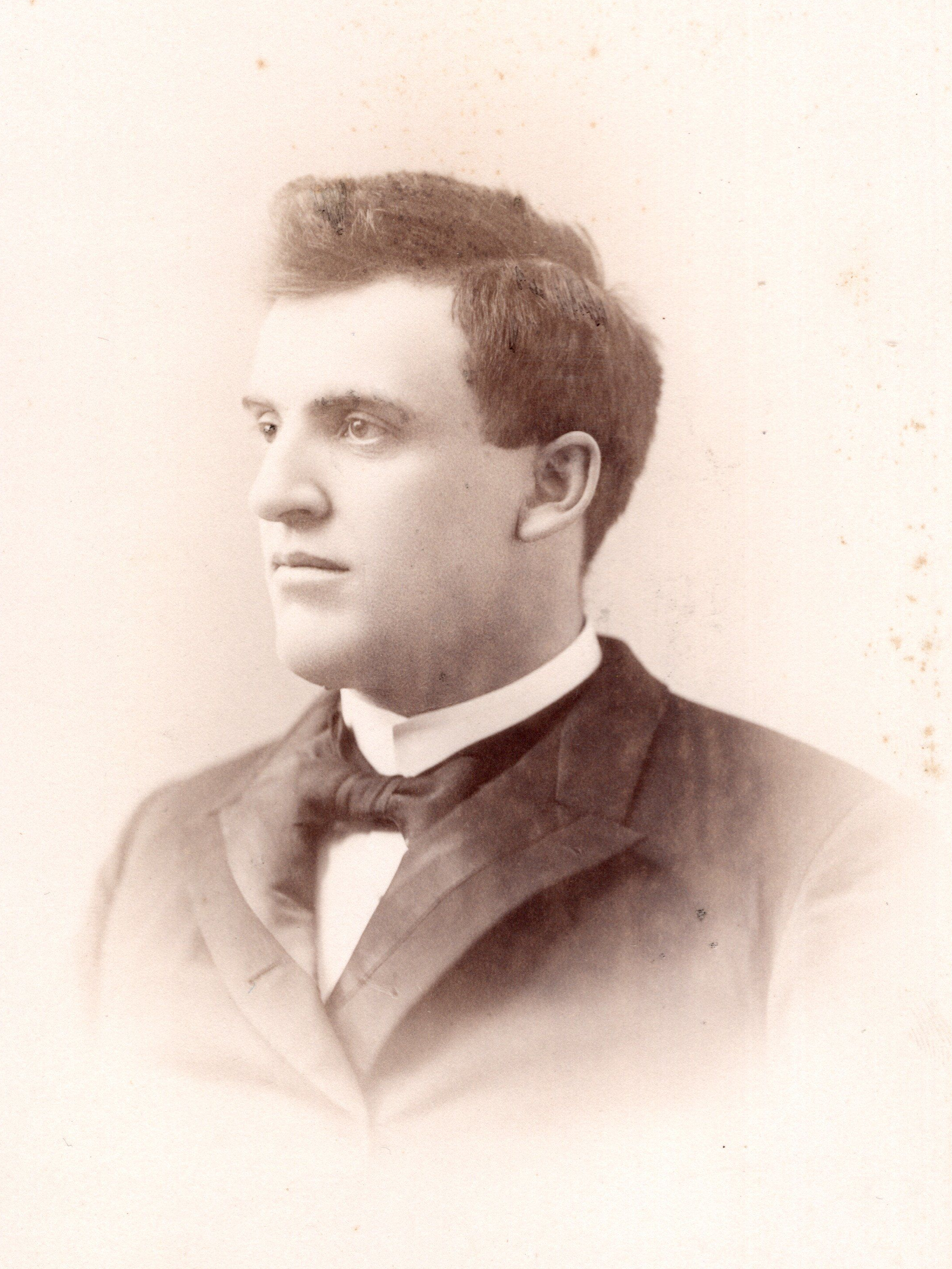
| Nominee | John C. Spooner | Neal Brown |
| Party | Republican | Democratic |
| Legislative vote | 105 | 27 |
| Percentage | 79.55% | 20.45% |
U.S. senator before election
John C. Spooner
Republican
Elected U.S. Senator
John C. Spooner
Republican

The 1903 United States Senate election in Wisconsin was held in the 46th Wisconsin Legislature on January 28, 1903. Incumbent Republican U.S. senator John Coit Spooner was re-elected on the first ballot.

In the 1903 term, Republicans held overwhelming majorities in both chambers of the Wisconsin Legislature, so had more than enough votes to elect a Republican United States senator.

== Major candidates ==
=== Democratic ===
- Neal Brown, prominent lawyer and former state legislator from Wausau, Wisconsin.

=== Republican ===
- John Coit Spooner, incumbent U.S. senator.

== Results ==
1st Vote of the 46th Wisconsin Legislature, January 28, 1903
| Party | Candidate | Votes | % |
|---|---|---|---|
| Republican | John Coit Spooner (incumbent) | 105 | 79.55% |
| Democratic | Neal Brown | 27 | 20.45% |
| | Vacant | 1 (Note: There was no representative of the Racine County 2nd district due to a tie in the general election.) | |
| Majority | | 67 | 50.76% |
| Total votes | | 132 | 99.25% |
| Republican hold | | | |
