= James Meehan (lumberman) =

American politician

James Meehan (July 7, 1834 – April 9, 1920) was an American lumberman from Meehan, Wisconsin, who served one term as a "Greenback Democrat" member of the Wisconsin State Assembly from Portage County, Wisconsin.

== Background ==
Meehan was born July 7, 1834, in the Parish of Ste. Catherine in Canada East. He received a common school education and became a lumberman. He moved to Wisconsin, first to Honey Creek in Sauk County, then to Grand Rapids, and finally in 1867 to the Town of Linwood in Portage County. He died on April 9, 1920, in Milwaukee, Wisconsin.

== Public office ==
From 1870 to 1877, Meehan was a member of the Portage County board of supervisors.

While he was elected to the Assembly in 1877 as a Greenbacker, unseating Republican incumbent William Arnott (there was no Democrat in the race), his official profile in the 1878 Wisconsin Blue Book lists him as a "Greenback Democrat". He was not a candidate for re-election in 1878, and was succeeded by former Assemblyman Thomas McDill, a Republican: there was no Greenbacker in the race, although there was a Democratic candidate).

It is unclear whether Meehan, Wisconsin, was named after him or not.
