= Thomas McDill =

19th century American judge & politician

Thomas H. McDill
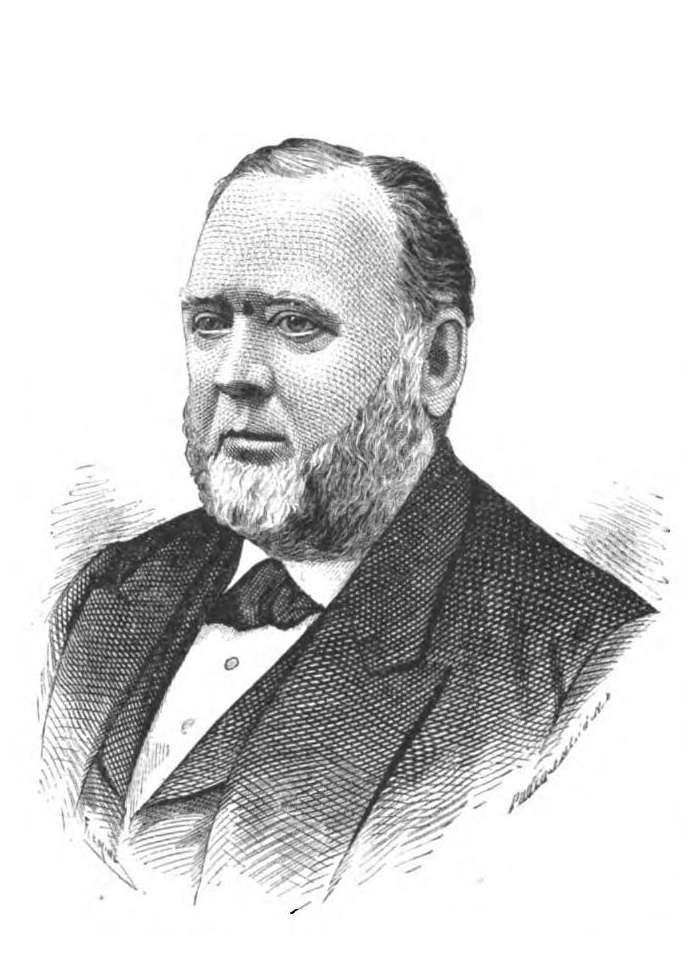
- Portrait from History of Northern Wisconsin (1881)

Member of the Wisconsin State Assembly from the Portage district
- In office January 6, 1879 – January 3, 1881
- Preceded by: James Meehan
- Succeeded by: James E. Rogers
- In office January 2, 1871 – January 1, 1872
- Preceded by: Frederick Huntley
- Succeeded by: Oliver Lamoreux
- In office January 7, 1867 – January 6, 1868
- Preceded by: James O. Raymond
- Succeeded by: Benjamin Burr

Personal details
- Born: July 18, 1815 Crawford County, Pennsylvania, U.S.
- Died: January 14, 1889 (aged 73) Chicago, Illinois, U.S.
- Resting place: Plover Cemetery, Plover, Wisconsin
- Party: Republican
- Spouse: Mary Ruth Harris (m. 1849; died 1881)
- Children: Clarissa Helen (Boughton)^{(b. 1850; died 1904)}; George Edward McDill^{(b. 1856; died 1905)}; Kate Adell McDill^{(b. 1861; died 1936)}; Charles W. McDill^{(foster son)}
- Relatives: Alexander S. McDill (brother); George D. McDill (nephew)

Military service
- Allegiance: United States
- Branch/service: United States Volunteers; Union Army
- Rank: Captain, USV
- Unit: Quartermaster Corps
- Battles/wars: American Civil War

Thomas Hazeltine McDill (July 18, 1815 – January 14, 1889) was an American businessman, Republican politician, and pioneer of Portage County, Wisconsin. He served four years in the Wisconsin State Assembly, representing Portage County.

== Biography ==
Thomas McDill was born in Crawford County, Pennsylvania, in July 1815. He received a common school education there and moved to the Wisconsin Territory in 1840, working as a lumberman at Mill Creek. He built the first sawmill on the Eau Claire River, near what's now Wausau, Wisconsin, in 1842. By 1844, a larger number of lumbermen had moved to the area, and he decided to sell the mill to open a hotel to take advantage of the influx of new residents. He set up his hotel at the nearby village of Plover, which was then the county seat of Portage County.

His hotel business brought him into local politics, and in 1847 he was appointed sheriff of Portage County by Governor Henry Dodge. He was subsequently elected to a full term in the position in 1848, and served as sheriff until he was elected county treasurer in 1856. That year, his younger brother, Dr. Alexander S. McDill, came to join him at Plover. Together, they opened a general store, operated a sawmill, and engaged in the lumber trade.

During the American Civil War, he served as an assistant quartermaster for the Union Army with the rank of captain.

After the war, he was elected to the Wisconsin State Assembly for the 1867 session. He was not a candidate for re-election, but returned to office in 1871. In 1876, he was a candidate for the Wisconsin State Senate, but lost to Henry Mumbrue. He went on to serve two more terms in the Assembly in 1879 and 1880. During this time, he also served as chairman of the town board and served eight years as chairman of the county board.

In 1870, McDill and his brother sold their businesses in Plover, and moved to the village of McDill, which had been named for him. He maintained his interests in the lumber business until his death. He died in Chicago on January 14, 1889.

== Personal life and family ==
Thomas McDill was a son of James McDill, an Irish American immigrant who served in the Pennsylvania Militia during the War of 1812. McDill's younger brother, Alexander S. McDill, served as a U.S. congressman and was superintendent of the State Hospital for the Insane. His nephew, George Davis McDill, served in the Iron Brigade of the Army of the Potomac and served three terms in the State Assembly.

Thomas McDill married Mary Ruth Harris on February 7, 1849. They had three children together and adopted a foster son. Their son, George Edward McDill, also became a prominent businessman and politician in Portage County and was chairman of the Republican Party of Wisconsin.

Wisconsin State Assembly
Preceded by James O. Raymond	Member of the Wisconsin State Assembly from the Portage district January 7, 1867 – January 6, 1868	Succeeded by Benjamin Burr
Preceded by Frederick Huntley	Member of the Wisconsin State Assembly from the Portage district January 2, 1871 – January 1, 1872	Succeeded by Oliver Lamoreux
Preceded by James Meehan	Member of the Wisconsin State Assembly from the Portage district January 6, 1879 – January 3, 1881	Succeeded by James E. Rogers
