= Plover, Portage County, Wisconsin =

Town in Portage County, Wisconsin

Plover, Wisconsin
- Town
- Town of Plover
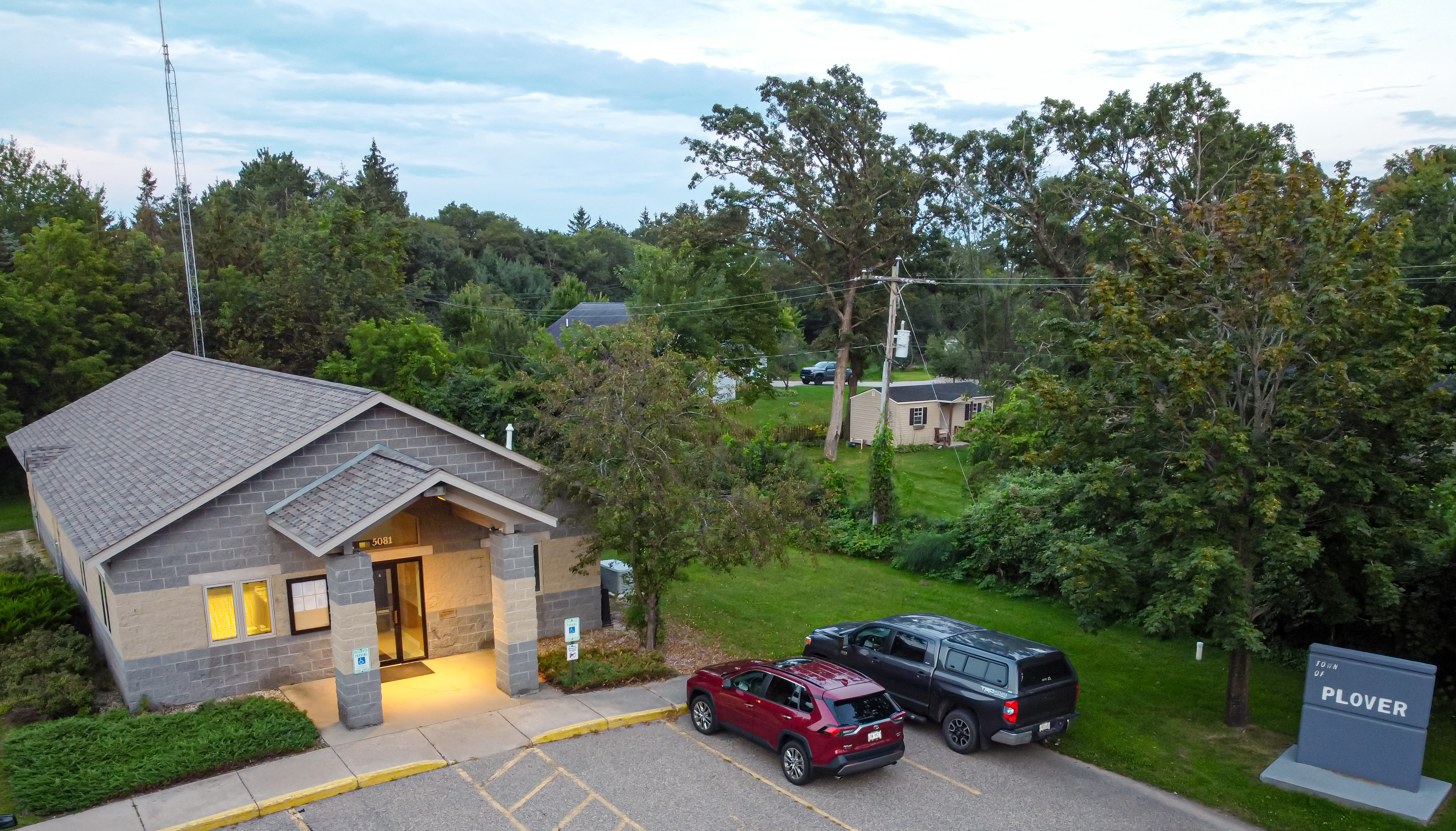
- Plover Town Hall

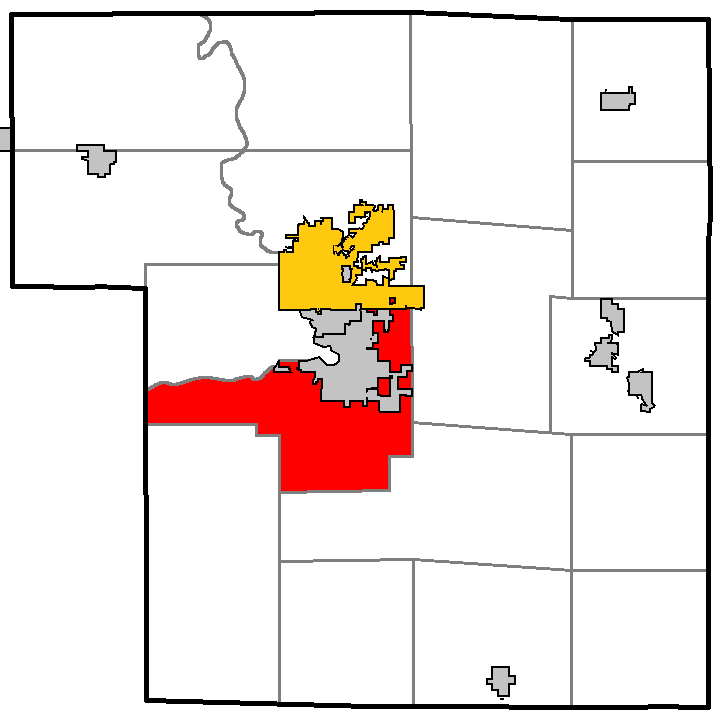
- Location of Plover, Portage County

- Location of Portage County, Wisconsin
- Coordinates: 44°25′42″N 89°34′53″W
- Country: United States
- State: Wisconsin
- County: Portage

Area
  - Total: 40.5 sq mi (105 km^{2})
  - Land: 38.98 sq mi (101.0 km^{2})
  - Water: 1.52 sq mi (3.9 km^{2})

Population (2020)
  - Total: 1,565
  - Density: 40.15/sq mi (15.50/km^{2})
- Time zone: UTC-6 (Central (CST))
  - Summer (DST): UTC-5 (CDT)
- Area code(s): 715 and 534
- GNIS feature ID: 1583942
- Website: https://townofplover.wi.gov/

Plover is a town in Portage County, Wisconsin, United States. As of the 2020 census, the town reported on its website a population of 1,565.

The Village of Plover is located north of the town.

The unincorporated community of Meehan is located in the town. The unincorporated community of Kellner is also located partially in the town.

== Geography ==
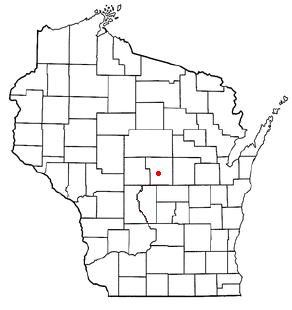
Location of Plover (town), Wisconsin

According to the United States Census Bureau, the town has a total area of 43.6 square miles (113.0 km^{2}), of which 42.3 square miles (109.5 km^{2}) is land and 1.3 square miles (3.5 km^{2}) (3.07%) is water.

== Demographics ==
=== 2000 Census ===
As of the census of 2000, there were 861 households, and 699 families residing in the town. The population density was 57.1 people per square mile (22.0/km^{2}). There were 916 housing units at an average density of 21.7 per square mile (8.4/km^{2}). The racial makeup of the town was 96.98% White, 0.25% Black or African American, 0.25% Native American, 1.86% Asian, 0.08% from other races, and 0.58% from two or more races. 0.54% of the population were Hispanic or Latino of any race.

There were 861 households, out of which 40.3% had children under the age of 18 living with them, 74.3% were married couples living together, 4.8% had a female householder with no husband present, and 18.7% were non-families. 14.5% of all households were made up of individuals, and 3.7% had someone living alone who was 65 years of age or older. The average household size was 2.80 and the average family size was 3.12.

In the town, the population was spread out, with 27.7% under the age of 18, 7.2% from 18 to 24, 31.8% from 25 to 44, 25.6% from 45 to 64, and 7.7% who were 65 years of age or older. The median age was 36 years. For every 100 females, there were 106.8 males. For every 100 females age 18 and over, there were 103.1 males.

The median income for a household in the town was $49,313, and the median income for a family was $59,569. Males had a median income of $37,784 versus $27,000 for females. The per capita income for the town was $21,186. About 1.8% of families and 3.7% of the population were below the poverty line, including 6.8% of those under age 18 and 5.5% of those age 65 or over.
