= Alexander S. McDill =

19th century American congressman and physician (1822–1875)

Member of the U.S. House of Representatives from Wisconsin's 8th district
- In office March 4, 1873 – March 3, 1875
- Preceded by: District established
- Succeeded by: George W. Cate

Member of the Wisconsin Senate from the 27th district
- In office January 5, 1863 – January 2, 1865
- Preceded by: Edward L. Browne
- Succeeded by: Milan H. Sessions

Member of the Wisconsin State Assembly from the Portage district
- In office January 6, 1862 – January 5, 1863
- Preceded by: Orestes Garrison (Marathon–Portage–Wood)
- Succeeded by: Enoch Webster

Personal details
- Born: March 18, 1822 Meadville, Pennsylvania, U.S.
- Died: November 12, 1875 (aged 53) Madison, Wisconsin, U.S.
- Resting place: Forest Hill Cemetery; Madison, Wisconsin, U.S.
- Party: Republican
- Spouse: Eliza Jane Rich (m. 1849–1875)
- Children: Narcissa (Fox) (Follansbee)^{(b. 1850; died 1920)}; John Rich McDill^{(b. 1861; died 1934)}
- Relatives: Thomas McDill (brother); George D. McDill (nephew)

Alexander Stuart McDill (March 18, 1822 – November 12, 1875) was an American medical doctor, Republican politician, and Wisconsin pioneer. He served one term in the United States House of Representatives, representing northern Wisconsin. He also served three years in the Wisconsin Legislature and was Superintendent of the State Hospital for the Insane, where he implemented important reforms in the state hospital system.

== Early life ==
Alexander Stuart McDill was born on March 18, 1822, near Meadville, Pennsylvania, the eighth of nine children born to Irish American immigrants James and Mary (née Brawley) McDill. He attended Allegheny College and graduated from Cleveland Medical College in 1848. He returned to Crawford County, Pennsylvania, and practiced medicine there until 1856, when he moved to Plover, Wisconsin, at the urging of his elder brother, Thomas, who had become well-established in the new state.

He quickly established himself as a leading physician in central Wisconsin, residing at the village of "McDill", named for his brother Thomas. He was also successful in pioneer mercantile interests, partnering with his brother on a general store, sawmill, and lumber business.

== Public office career ==
He entered politics with the Republican Party in the midst of the American Civil War. He was elected to the Wisconsin State Assembly in 1861, and was then elected to the Wisconsin State Senate in 1862. In 1864, he had the honor of being chosen as a presidential elector for Abraham Lincoln's re-election.

While serving in the Legislature, he was appointed to the commission for the State Hospital for the Insane near Madison, and was intensely involved in that organization. In 1868, he was named superintendent of the hospital. He instituted reforms at the hospital to end abusive treatment, coordinating with the state courts, and he lobbied the state Legislature to reform the State Board of Charities into the State Board of Charities and Reform—the prior organization was solely tasked with managing the financial concerns of the state hospitals; the new entity was also tasked with ensuring that the hospitals were well-run.

In 1872, he was elected to the United States House of Representatives in the newly created 8th congressional district—then comprising nearly all of the northern half of the state. He served in the Forty-third Congress (March 4, 1873 – March 3, 1875). He ran for re-election in 1874, but fell just 2 votes short of his Democratic opponent, George W. Cate. McDill initially declared his intention to challenge the results, but later withdrew his challenge and retired from politics.

On his return from Washington, D.C., he was reappointed to his position as superintendent of the state hospital. However, just a few months later, on November 12, 1875, he died of pneumonia near Madison. He was interred at Madison's historic Forest Hill Cemetery.

== Family and legacy ==
Alexander Stuart McDill was a son of James McDill, an Irish American immigrant who served in the Pennsylvania Militia during the War of 1812. Alexander McDill's older brother, Thomas McDill, served as a quartermaster for the Union Army in the American Civil War, and later served four terms in the Wisconsin State Assembly. His nephew, George Davis McDill, served in the Iron Brigade of the Army of the Potomac and served three terms in the State Assembly.

Alexander McDill married Eliza Jane Rich of Woolrich, Pennsylvania, on July 31, 1849. They had two children.

- Narcissa McDill, married medical doctor William Fox of Fitchburg.
- John Rich McDill became a prominent medical doctor and served as a major in the U.S. Army Medical Corps, serving in the Philippines and managing a veterans hospital in Waukesha, Wisconsin. John Rich McDill is buried at Arlington National Cemetery.

McDill Pond, McDill Elementary School, and a section of the bike/walk trail, the Green Circle, among other things in the Plover/Stevens Point area, have been named for Alexander McDill.

== Electoral history ==
=== U.S. House of Representatives (1872, 1874) ===
Wisconsin's 8th Congressional District Election, 1872
Party	Candidate	Votes	%	±%
General Election, November 5, 1872
Republican	Alexander S. McDill	10,711	59.67%	
Democratic	William Carson	7,238	40.33%	
Plurality		3,473	19.35%	
Total votes		17,949	100.0%	
Republican win (new seat)				

Wisconsin's 8th Congressional District Election, 1874
Party	Candidate	Votes	%	±%
General Election, November 3, 1874
Democratic	George W. Cate	9,446	50.01%	−9.68%
Republican	Alexander S. McDill (incumbent)	9,444	49.99%	
Plurality		2	0.01%	-19.34%
Total votes		18,890	100.0%	+5.24%
Democratic gain from Republican				

Wisconsin State Assembly
Preceded by Orestes Garrison (Marathon–Portage–Wood)	Member of the Wisconsin State Assembly from the Portage district January 6, 1862 – January 5, 1863	Succeeded by Enoch Webster
Wisconsin Senate
Preceded by Edward L. Browne	Member of the Wisconsin Senate from the 27th district January 5, 1863 – January 2, 1865	Succeeded by Milan H. Sessions
U.S. House of Representatives
New district established	Member of the U.S. House of Representatives from Wisconsin's 8th congressional district March 4, 1873 – March 3, 1875	Succeeded by George W. Cate
