= Thaddeus C. Pound =

American politician

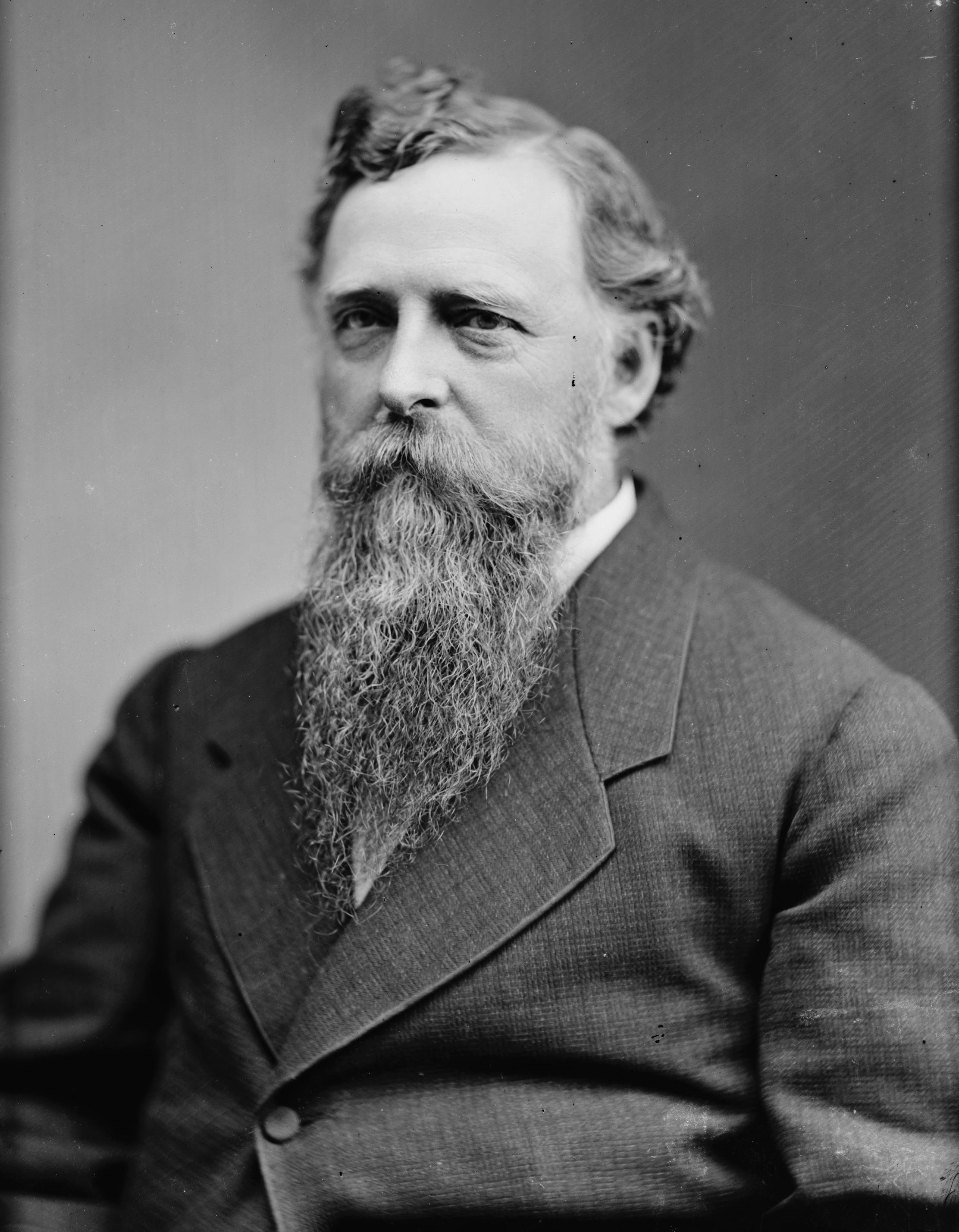

Member of the U.S. House of Representatives from Wisconsin's 8th district
- In office March 4, 1877 – March 3, 1883
- Preceded by: George W. Cate
- Succeeded by: William T. Price

10th Lieutenant Governor of Wisconsin
- In office January 3, 1870 – January 1, 1872
- Governor: Lucius Fairchild
- Preceded by: Wyman Spooner
- Succeeded by: Milton H. Pettit

Member of the Wisconsin State Assembly from the Chippewa, Dunn district
- In office January 1, 1869 – January 1, 1870
- Preceded by: Samuel W. Hunt
- Succeeded by: Jedediah W. Granger

Member of the Wisconsin State Assembly from the Chippewa, Dunn, Eau Claire district
- In office January 1, 1866 – January 1, 1868
- Preceded by: Francis R. Church
- Succeeded by: Samuel W. Hunt; for Chippewa and Dunn; Horace W. Barnes; for Eau Claire and Pepin
- In office January 1, 1864 – January 1, 1865
- Preceded by: William H. Smith
- Succeeded by: Francis R. Church

Personal details
- Born: Thaddeus Coleman Pound; December 6, 1832 Elk Township, Warren County, Pennsylvania, U.S.
- Died: November 21, 1914 (aged 81) Chicago, Illinois, U.S.
- Resting place: Forest Hill Cemetery; Chippewa Falls, Wisconsin
- Party: Republican
- Relatives: Albert Pound (brother); Ezra Pound (grandson)

Thaddeus Coleman Pound (December 6, 1832 (Note: His birthdate, which is actually in 1832, is often given as 1833 (probably as a result of subtracting his age from his death date, when he was born in December, resulting in error) but 1832 is correct, as confirmed by his death certificate.) – November 20 or 21, 1914) was an American businessman from Wisconsin who served in both houses of the Wisconsin legislature, as the 10th lieutenant governor of Wisconsin, and as a U.S. representative (1877–1883). His brother was Albert Pound, who also served in the Wisconsin Assembly. He was a member of the Republican Party.

He was the paternal grandfather of the poet Ezra Pound.

== Life and career ==
Born in Elk Township, Warren County, Pennsylvania, Pound moved with his parents, Judith (Coleman) and Elijah Pound, to Monroe County, New York in 1838 and then to the city of Rochester, New York, afterwards moving to what is now Rock County, Wisconsin. He became a member of the Wisconsin State Assembly and the Wisconsin State Senate. Pound was elected as Lieutenant Governor of Wisconsin serving under Governor Lucius Fairchild from January 3, 1870 until January 1, 1872.

In 1876, Pound was elected to the Forty-fifth Congress, replacing George W. Cate of the Democratic Party in representing Wisconsin's 8th congressional district. He was reelected to the Forty-sixth and Forty-seventh Congresses (March 4, 1877 – March 3, 1883), and was succeeded in the 48th Congress by his fellow-Republican William T. Price.

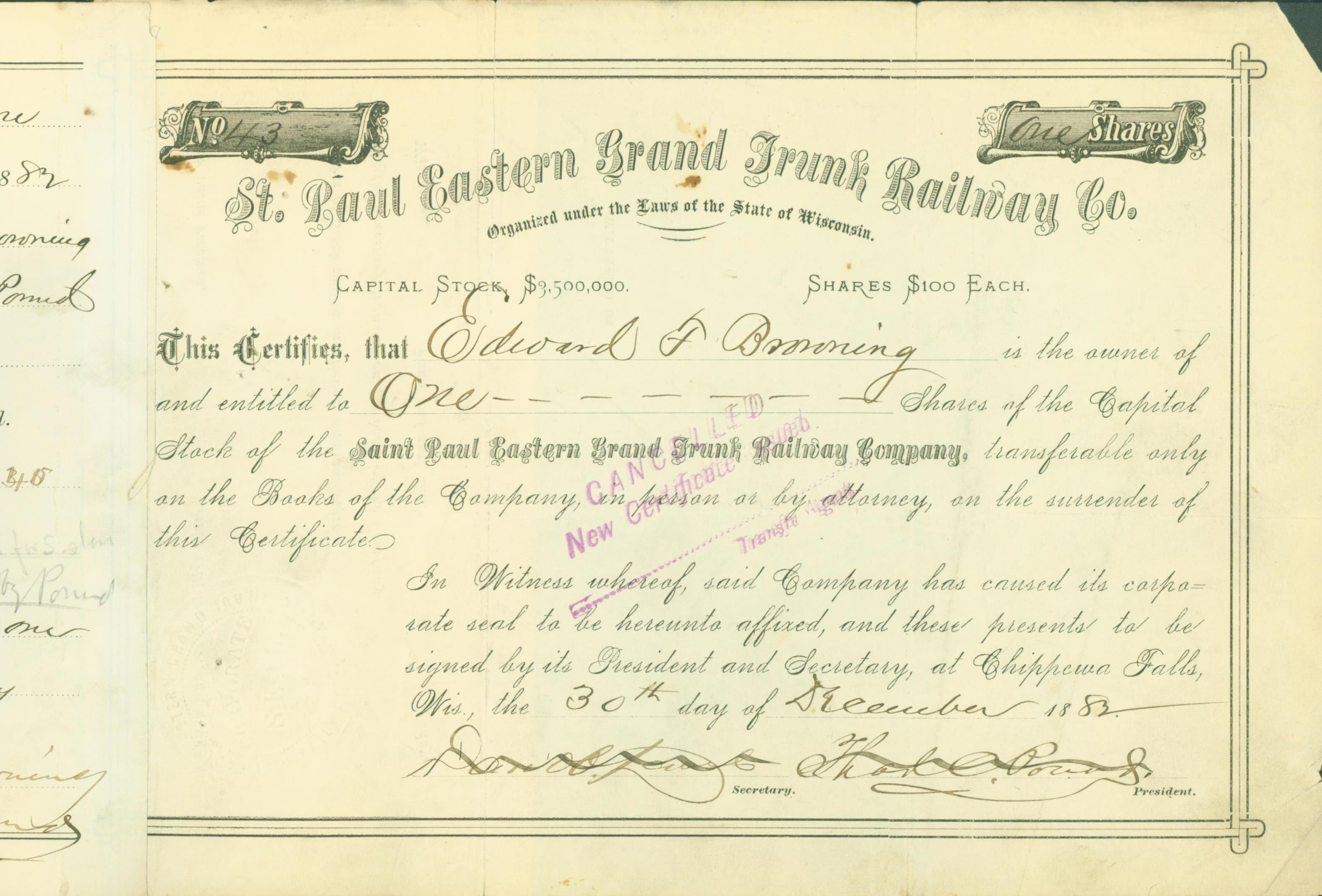
Share of the Saint Paul Eastern Grand Trunk Railway Company, issued 30 December 1883, signed by President Pound

During his time as a representative, Pound was a prominent businessman in Wisconsin. He was president of the Chippewa Falls and Western Railway and the St. Paul Eastern Grand Trunk Railway (both predecessors of the Soo Line Railroad). He also served as president of the Chippewa Spring Water Company (a company still in business as of 2008) as well as the Union Lumber Company, which was reorganized as the Chippewa Falls Lumber and Boom Company in 1879.

== Death and legacy ==
Pound died in Chicago, Illinois on November 20 or 21, 1914, aged 81. The village of Pound, Wisconsin, is named in his honor.

== Notes ==
Political offices
Preceded by Wyman Spooner	Lieutenant Governor of Wisconsin; January 3, 1870–January 1, 1872	Succeeded by Milton Pettit
U.S. House of Representatives
Preceded by George W. Cate	Member of the U.S. House of Representatives from Wisconsin's 8th congressional district March 4, 1877 - March 3, 1883	Succeeded by William T. Price
