= Marcus Trumer =

19th century American politician

Member of the Wisconsin State Assembly from the Dodge 4th district
- In office January 2, 1871 – January 1, 1872
- Preceded by: Henry Bertram
- Succeeded by: Silas W. Lamoreux

Personal details
- Born: April 25, 1842 Stuben, Austrian Empire
- Died: March 11, 1880 (aged 37)
- Cause of death: Rheumatism
- Resting place: Saint Johns Catholic Cemetery, Woodland, Wisconsin
- Party: Democratic
- Spouse: Theresa Wagner (m. 1866–1880)
- Children: Frances (Haupert)^{(b. 1867; died 1958)}; Mary Ann (Wiser)^{(b. 1869; died 1903)}; Marcus Maximillian Trumer^{(b. 1871; died 1926)}; Johann Trumer^{(b. 1872; died 1878)}; Johann L. Trumer^{(b. 1874; died 1874)}; Johanna Trumer^{(b. 1875; died 1876)}

Military service
- Allegiance: United States
- Branch/service: United States Volunteers; Union Army
- Years of service: 1862–1866
- Rank: Sergeant, USV
- Unit: 34th Reg. Wis. Vol. Infantry; 35th Reg. Wis. Vol. Infantry
- Battles/wars: American Civil War

Marcus Trumer (April 25, 1842 – March 11, 1880) was an Austrian American immigrant and Democratic politician. He was a member of the Wisconsin State Assembly for one term, representing southeast Dodge County in the 1871 session.

== Biography ==
Marcus Trumer was born on April 25, 1842, in Stuben, in the Austrian Empire. He received a common school education and emigrated to the United States. He moved to Erin, Wisconsin, in 1856.

He was drafted into the Union Army during the second year of the American Civil War, and enrolled as a private in Company K of the 34th Wisconsin Infantry Regiment. He was then transferred to Company F, where he was promoted to sergeant. The 34th Wisconsin Infantry didn't see any combat, they were stationed as a garrison in Kentucky for their nine months of service.

At the expiration of the nine months enlistment for the 34th Wisconsin Infantry, Trumer re-enlisted as a veteran with the 35th Wisconsin Infantry Regiment and served as a sergeant in Company K for the remainder of the war. The 35th Wisconsin Infantry served mostly in Louisiana and participated in the Battle of Spanish Fort in Alabama.

After the war, Trumer moved to the town of Rubicon, in Dodge County, Wisconsin, where he purchased and ran a hotel. There he was elected to local offices, including town clerk and justice of the peace. He became a naturalized American citizen in 1870, and later that year he was elected to the Wisconsin State Assembly, running on the Democratic Party ticket. He represented Dodge County's 4th Assembly district, which then comprised roughly the southeast corner of the county. He did not run for another term in 1871.

He died in 1880, only 37 years old. His death was caused by heart disease exacerbated by Rheumatism attributed to his war service.

== Electoral history ==
=== Wisconsin Assembly (1870) ===
Wisconsin Assembly, Dodge 4th District Election, 1870
Party	Candidate	Votes	%	±%
General Election, November 8, 1870
Democratic	Marcus Trumer	1,114	67.93%	+20.17%
Republican	C. P. Lovell	526	32.07%	
Plurality		588	35.85%	+31.36%
Total votes		1,640	100.0%	+9.99%
Democratic hold				

Wisconsin State Assembly
Preceded by Henry Bertram	Member of the Wisconsin State Assembly from the Dodge 4th district January 2, 1871 – January 1, 1872	Succeeded by Silas W. Lamoreux
