= Neal Brown (politician) =

American politician (1856–1917)

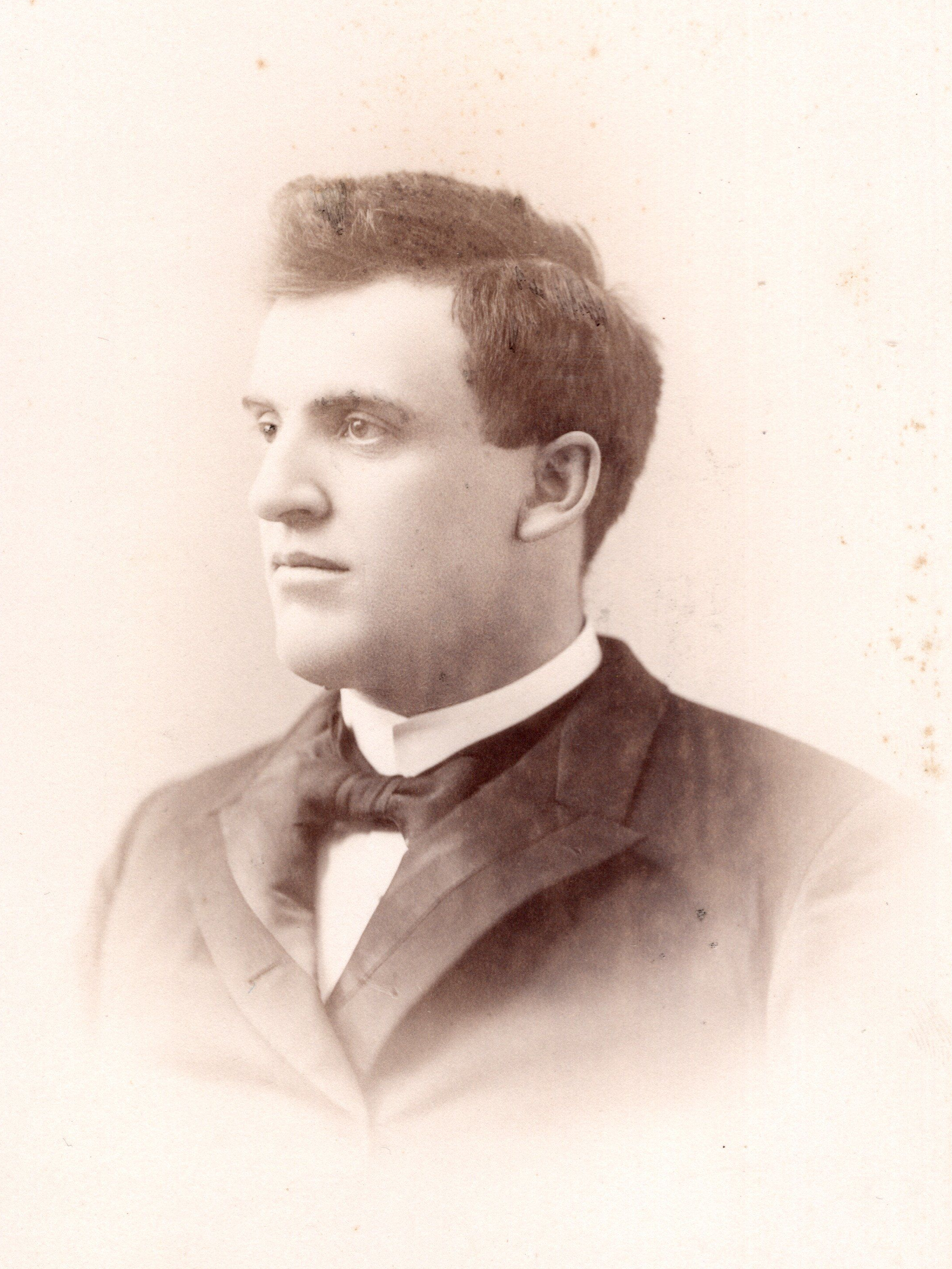
- Photo dated Apr. 1891

Member of the Wisconsin Senate from the 12th district
- In office January 2, 1893 – January 4, 1897
- Preceded by: Phineas Clawson
- Succeeded by: Clarence A. Lamoreux

Member of the Wisconsin State Assembly from the Marathon 1st district
- In office January 5, 1891 – January 2, 1893
- Preceded by: Joseph Chesak
- Succeeded by: Albert B. Barney

Personal details
- Born: February 24, 1856 Fort Atkinson, Wisconsin, U.S.
- Died: September 18, 1917 (aged 61) Watkins Glen, New York, U.S.
- Resting place: Pine Grove Cemetery, Wausau, Wisconsin
- Party: Democratic
- Spouse: Louise Harriet Norton (m. 1892–1917)
- Education: University of Wisconsin Law School
- Profession: Lawyer

Neal Brown (February 24, 1856 – September 18, 1917) was an American lawyer, businessman, writer, and Democratic politician from Wausau, Wisconsin. He served four years in the Wisconsin Senate (1893–1897) and two years in the Wisconsin State Assembly (1891–1893).

== Biography ==
Born in Fort Atkinson, Wisconsin, Brown graduated from the University of Wisconsin Law School.

Brown practiced law in Wausau, Wisconsin, and was involved with the paper, railway, electric, and insurance industries. Brown also was a writer. He wrote: "The Comedy of History," "The Paper Industry and The Tariff," "Critical Confessions," and "Songs by Neal Brown."

Brown was a Democrat. He served in the Wisconsin State Assembly in 1891 and then in the Wisconsin Senate from 1893 to 1897. Brown was the Democratic nominee for U.S. Senate in 1903.

Brown died in Watkins Glen, New York, while undergoing treatment for a heart problem.
