= Orestes Garrison =

American politician

Orestes Garrison (August 8, 1813 – June 3, 1874) was an American surveyor and politician.

Born in Fort Ann, New York, Garrison was a surveyor for the United States Government and lived in Indiana. In 1843, Garrison, his wife and family moved to McHenry County, Illinois. Then in 1855, they moved to Centralia, Wisconsin (now Wisconsin Rapids, Wisconsin). Garrison was involved in real estate. In 1861, Garrison served in the Wisconsin State Assembly. He died of colon cancer in Centralia, Wisconsin.
