= Patrick H. Cashin =

American businessman and politician

- Born: April 4, 1851; Granville, Milwaukee County, Wisconsin
- Died: November 29, 1926 (aged 75); Stevens Point, Wisconsin

Patrick Henry Cashin (April 4, 1851 – November 29, 1926) was an American businessman and politician.

Born in the town of Granville, Milwaukee County, Wisconsin, Cashin went to the Granville public schools. From 1877 to 1882, Cashin lived in Kansas City, Missouri. He then settled in Stevens Point, Wisconsin in 1882. Cashin was in the liquor and barber business. He was also a carpenter and contractor. Cashin served on the Stevens Point Common Council and was president of the council. He also served as Mayor of Stevens Point. From 1897 to 1891, Cashin served in the Wisconsin State Assembly and was a Democrat. Cashin died in a hospital in Stevens Point, Wisconsin from cancer.
