= Fancher, Wisconsin =

- Unincorporated community
- Location within Wisconsin Location within the United States
- Coordinates: 44°28′21.2″N 89°22′23.4″W
- Country: United States
- State: Wisconsin
- County: Portage
- Elevation: 1,138 ft (347 m)
- Time zone: UTC-6 (Central (CST))
  - Summer (DST): UTC-5 (CDT)
- Area codes: 715 and 534
- GNIS feature ID: 1564852

Fancher is an unincorporated community in Portage County, Wisconsin, United States.

== Geography ==
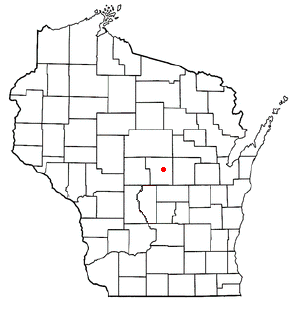
Location of Fancher, Wisconsin

Fancher is located in central Wisconsin approximately halfway between Stevens Point, and Amherst, south of U.S. Highway 10 on County Road K. The general area of present-day Fancher is on County Road K between Townline Road and Lake Thomas Road in the town of Stockton. (Lat: 44° 28' 21.2", Lon: -89° 22' 23.4")

== History ==
Fancher was named for Orson Fancher, who operated the first post office for the area, beginning in 1891. Soon after, the Fancher School and St. Mary of Mount Carmel Church were constructed near the Fancher residence and post office at their present-day locations.

Fancher was considered a "flag stop" for the railroad when it created access for potato warehouses in the area. A blacksmith shop, bar and hotel were constructed near Smokey Road and Fourth Street in the town of Stockton, called "Smokey Spur." That name is still found today in the Smokey Spur Bar.

The old Fox Valley and Western Railroad which once was the "spur" near Fancher has now been incorporated into the Tomorrow River State Trail.
