= Salem Evangelical Lutheran Church =

Historic church in Pennsylvania, United States

- U.S. National Register of Historic Places
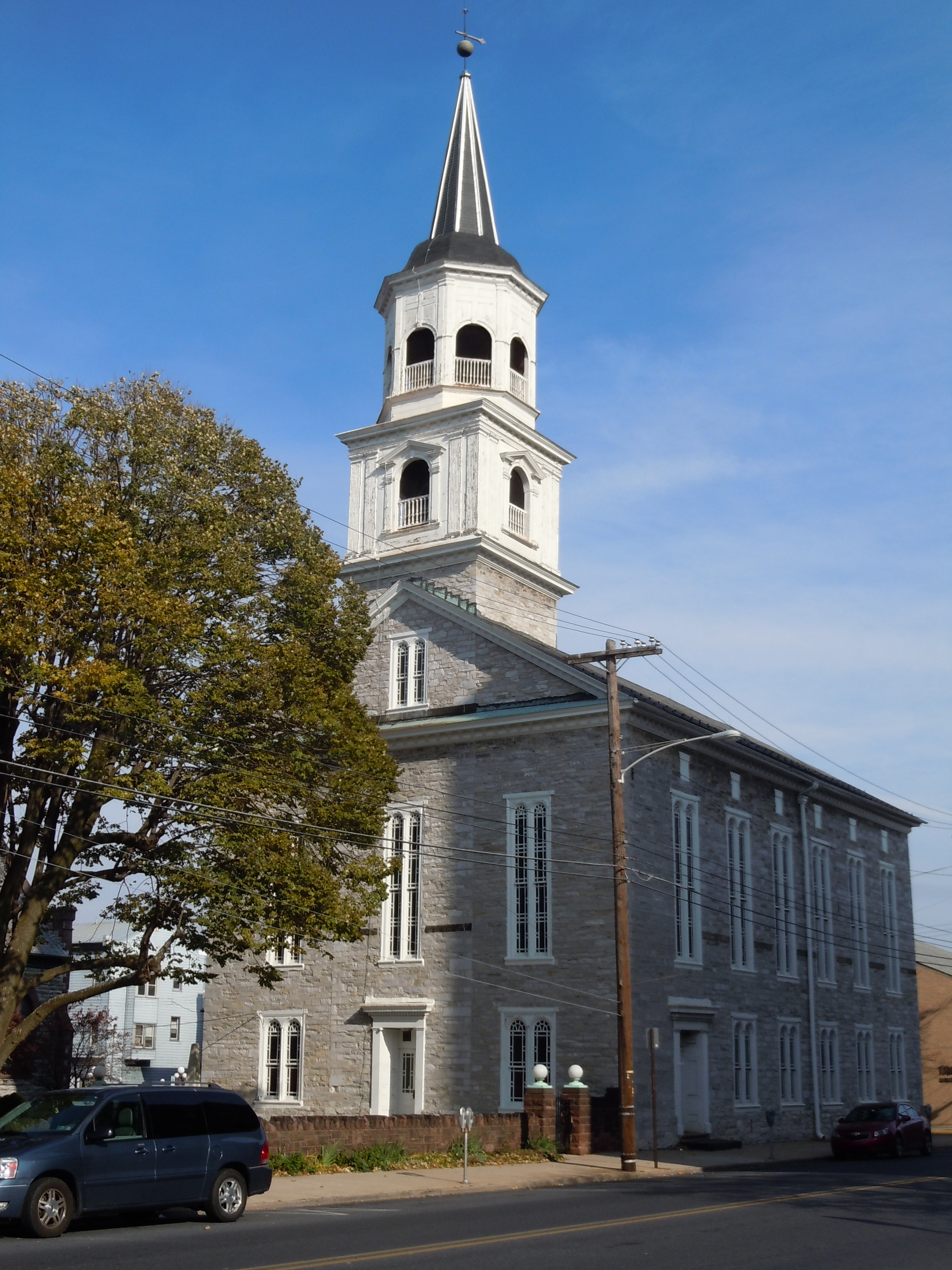
- Salem Evangelical Lutheran Church, November 2011

- Location within Pennsylvania Location within the United States
- Location: 119 N Eighth St., Lebanon, Pennsylvania
- Coordinates: 40°20′28″N 76°25′31″W
- Area: 1.2 acres (0.49 ha)
- Built: 1796-1798, 1848, 1898
- Architect: Uhler, Christopher; Ritcher, Abner Augustus
- Architectural style: Colonial, Gothic, Richardsonian Romanesque
- NRHP reference No.: 10000402
- Added to NRHP: June 28, 2010

Salem Evangelical Lutheran Church, also known as the Old Salem Lutheran Church, is an historic Evangelical Lutheran church in Lebanon, Lebanon County, Pennsylvania, United States.

It was added to the National Register of Historic Places in 2010.

== History and architectural features ==
This historic property includes two contributing buildings: the eighteenth-century Old Salem church and the nineteen-century Salem Memorial Chapel. The Old Salem church was built between 1796 and 1798, and is a two-story, rectangular, limestone building. It was modified in 1848 to infill corners and add the second story. The Salem Memorial Chapel was built in 1898, and is a limestone and sandstone building that was designed in a Gothic style with Richardsonian Romanesque influences. It was renovated in 1928. A ten-foot tall obelisk was also erected on the property.
