= George W. Cate =

18th century American congressman, judge, and member of the Wisconsin Senate

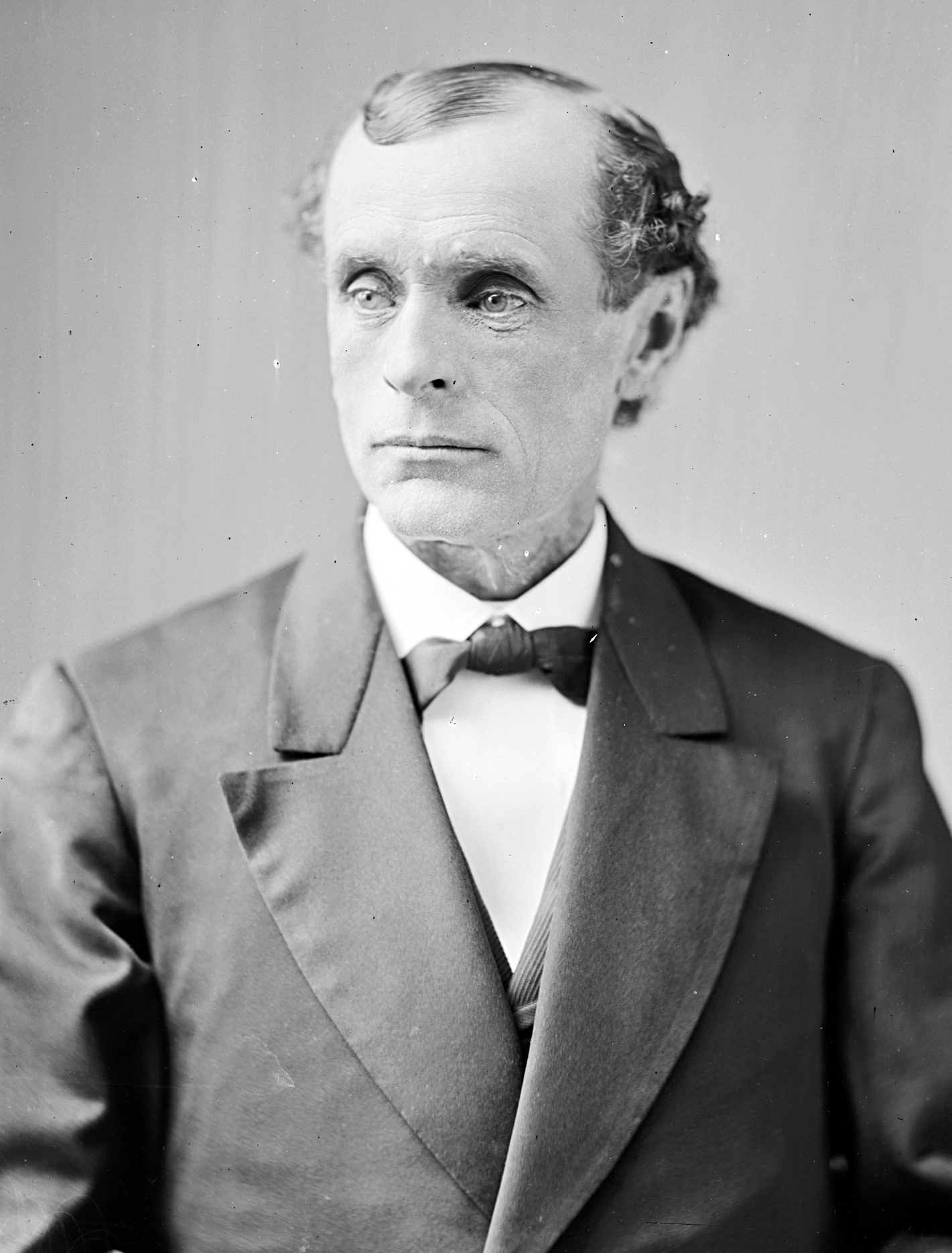

Member of the U.S. House of Representatives from Wisconsin's 8th district
- In office March 4, 1875 – March 3, 1877
- Preceded by: Alexander S. McDill
- Succeeded by: Thaddeus C. Pound

Wisconsin Circuit Court Judge for the 7th Circuit
- In office June 1, 1854 – March 4, 1875
- Succeeded by: Gilbert L. Park

Member of the Wisconsin State Assembly from the Marathon–Portage district
- In office January 1, 1852 – January 1, 1854
- Preceded by: Thomas J. Morman
- Succeeded by: Walter D. McIndoe

Personal details
- Born: George Washington Cate; September 17, 1825 Montpelier, Vermont
- Died: March 7, 1905 (aged 79) Stevens Point, Wisconsin
- Resting place: Forest Cemetery; Stevens Point, Wisconsin
- Party: Democratic
- Spouses: Levara Serena Brown; (m. 1851; died 1916)
- Children: Albert George Cate^{(b. 1851; died 1933)}; Lynn Boyd Cate^{(b. 1854; died 1937)}; Ida Levara Cate^{(b. 1856; died 1866)}; Annie Serena Cate^{(b. 1859; died 1881)}; Carrie Levara (Cronyn)^{(b. 1864; died 1944)}; Henry Brown Cate^{(b. 1870; died 1956)}; Ruth Gray Cate^{(b. 1874; died 1955)}; Georgeana (Dahl)^{(b. 1879; died 1949)}

George Washington Cate (September 17, 1825 – March 7, 1905) was an American lawyer and politician who served as a member of the United States House of Representatives for Wisconsin's 8th congressional district in the Forty-fourth Congress. He also served two terms in the Wisconsin State Assembly and 21 years as a Wisconsin Circuit Court judge.

== Biography ==
Born in Montpelier, Vermont, Cate attended the common schools. He studied law in the office of Lucius Benedict Peck in Montpelier, paying his expenses by teaching school. He was admitted to the bar at Montpelier in April 1844.

He moved to the Wisconsin Territory in 1845 and supported himself in the lumber industry until he began the practice of law in Plover, in Portage County, on January 1, 1848. He served as Deputy Postmaster, Register of Deeds, and Clerk to the Board of Supervisors that year. In 1849, he was elected District Attorney and served for two terms. He moved to Stevens Point, Wisconsin, in 1852, where he opened a law office. He served as member of the Wisconsin State Assembly in 1852 and 1853.

Cate was elected Wisconsin circuit court judge for the 7th judicial circuit in April 1854, defeating former Whig state senator James S. Alban. He was re-elected in 1860, 1866, and 1872. In 1874, he was a candidate for the United States House of Representatives, running as a Liberal Reformer. Democratic canvassers committed fraud to secure his election, though Judge Cate was not implicated in this act. His opponent, Dr. Alexander S. McDill, challenged the results, but died before the court could determine that he had been the victor. Thus Judge Cate was allowed to take office for the Forty-fourth Congress (March 4, 1875 – March 4, 1877). While in office, he represented Wisconsin's 8th congressional district. He was an unsuccessful candidate for reelection in 1876.

He resumed the practice of law in Stevens Point, Wisconsin, and lived there for the rest of his life. Twenty years after leaving office, he was nominated for congress again against his own protests in 1896. At the time, he sent a telegram to the nominating convention saying: "I cannot possibly accept nomination. I am old and poor." Despite his protests, the convention nominated him unanimously, and Cate reluctantly participated in a final campaign. He was badly beaten in the general election, receiving just 38% of the vote.

Cate died peacefully at his home in Stevens Point on the morning of March 7, 1905, after suffering from worsening asthma. He was interred in Forest Cemetery, Stevens Point, Wisconsin.

== Personal life and family ==
George Cate was a son of Isaac and Clarissa (née McKnight) Cate of Vermont. His father was a non-commissioned officer in the War of 1812, and his grandfather was an enlisted volunteer in the American Revolutionary War.

On October 24, 1851, George W. Cate married Levara Serena Brown (1836–1916) at Stevens Point. They raised eight children: Albert George Cate (1851–1933), Lynn Boyd Cate (1854–1937), Ida Levara Cate (1856–1866), Annie Serena Cate (1859–1881), Carrie Levara Cate (1864–1944) married William Jerome Cronyn, M.D., LL.B., who helped to establish Marquette University, Henry Brown Cate (1870–1956), Ruth Gray Cate (1874–1955), Georgeana Cate (1879–1949) married Gerhard Melvin Dahl, J.D., who was Vice President of Chase National Bank from 1917 to 1923 and then chairman of the Brooklyn Manhattan Transit Corp. in New York City from 1923 to 1943.

== Electoral history ==
=== U.S. House of Representatives (1874, 1876) ===
Wisconsin's 8th Congressional District Election, 1874
Party	Candidate	Votes	%	±%
General Election, November 3, 1874
Reform	George W. Cate	9,446	50.01%	
Republican	Alexander S. McDill (incumbent)	9,444	49.99%	−9.68%
Plurality		2	0.01%	-19.34%
Total votes		18,890	100.0%	+5.24%
Reform gain from Republican				

Wisconsin's 8th Congressional District Election, 1876
Party	Candidate	Votes	%	±%
General Election, November 7, 1876
Republican	Thaddeus C. Pound	14,838	51.69%	
Democratic	George W. Cate (incumbent)	13,869	48.31%	−1.69%
Plurality		969	3.38%	+3.36%
Total votes		28,707	100.0%	+51.97%
Republican gain from Democratic				

=== U.S. House of Representatives (1896) ===
Wisconsin's 8th Congressional District Election, 1896
Party	Candidate	Votes	%	±%
General Election, November 3, 1896
Republican	Edward S. Minor (incumbent)	26,471	60.30%	+6.08%
Democratic	George W. Cate	13,869	38.37%	−3.92%
Prohibition	John W. Evans	580	1.32%	
Plurality		9,626	21.93%	+10.00%
Total votes		28,707	100.0%	+51.97%
Republican hold				

== Sources ==
- United States Congress. "George W. Cate (id: C000248)". Biographical Directory of the United States Congress.

U.S. House of Representatives
Preceded by Alexander S. McDill	Member of the U.S. House of Representatives from Wisconsin's 8th congressional district March 4, 1875 – March 4, 1877	Succeeded by Thaddeus C. Pound
