= Thomas Wesley Anderson =

American politician

Thomas Wesley Anderson (1828–1916) was a member of the Wisconsin State Assembly.

== Biography ==
Anderson was born on March 30, 1828, in Eaton, New York. Eventually, he owned a farm in Stockton, Wisconsin. He died on December 18, 1916.

== Assembly career ==
Anderson was a member of the Assembly during the 1876 session. He was a Republican.
