= William Arnott (politician) =

American politician (1832–1907)

William Arnott (September 5, 1832 – May 26, 1907) was an American farmer and politician.

Born in Jerusalem, New York, Arnott and his wife moved to Wisconsin and settled in Portage County, Wisconsin in 1864. He was a farmer. Arnott served on the town of Stockton, Wisconsin board and the Portage County, Wisconsin Board of Supervisors. In 1876, Arnott served in the Wisconsin State Assembly as a Republican. Arnott died in Stevens Point, Wisconsin. The unincorporated community of Arnott, Wisconsin was named after him.
