= Wayne Township, Crawford County, Pennsylvania =

Township in Pennsylvania, US

Coordinates: 41°34′00″N 79°57′59″W

- Township
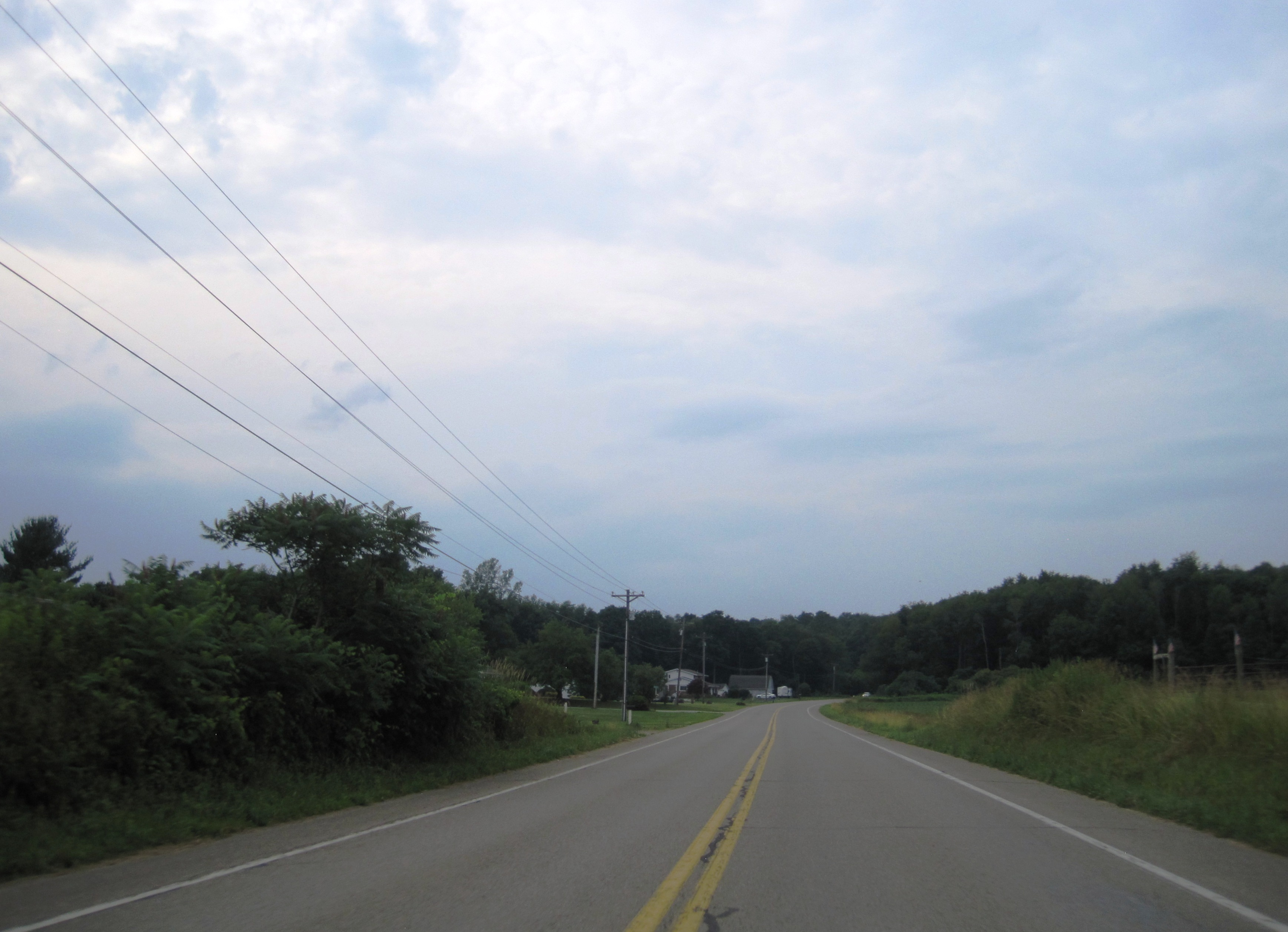
- US 322 westbound in Wayne Township

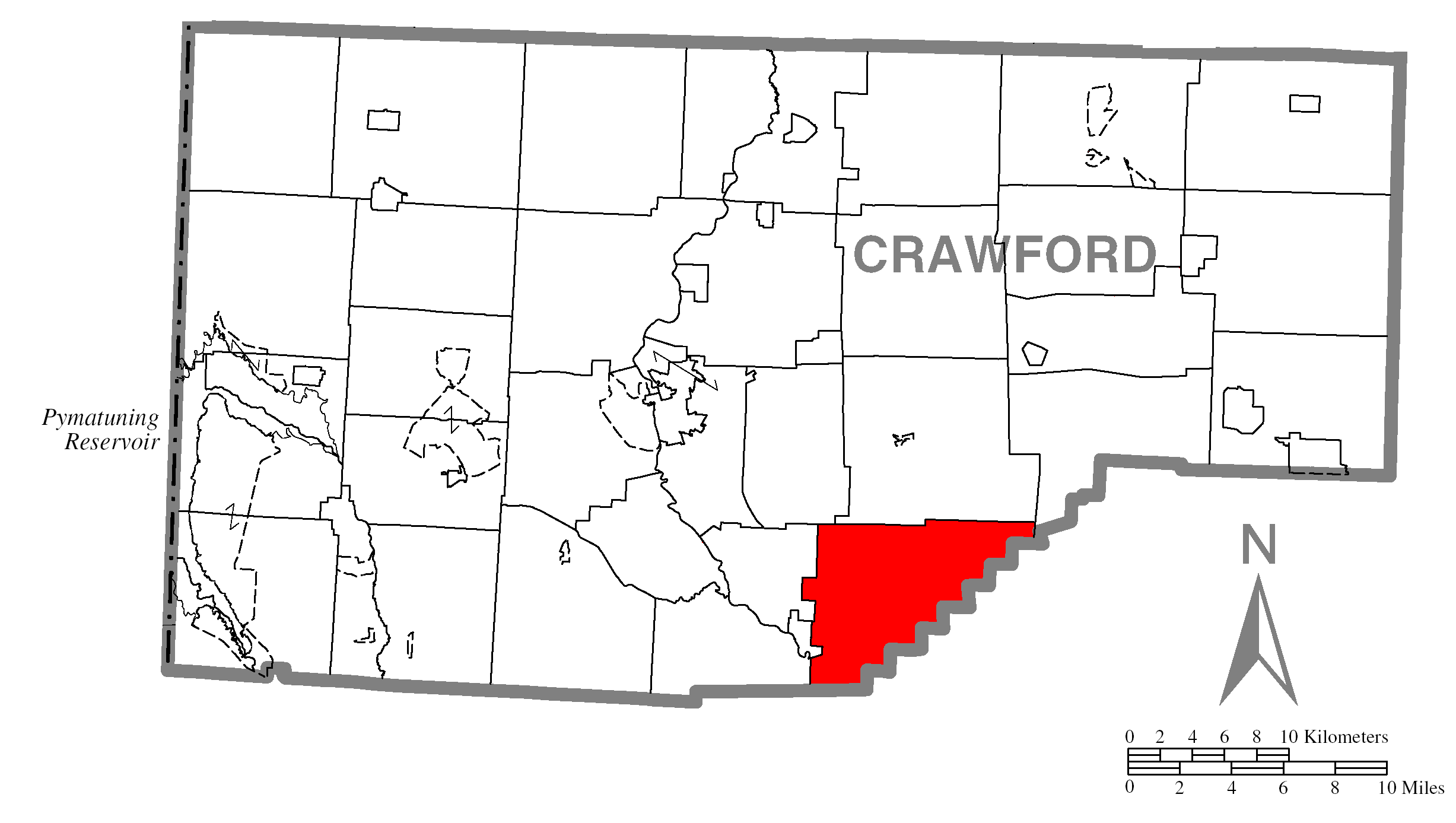
- Location of Wayne Township in Crawford County

- Location of Crawford County in Pennsylvania
- Country: United States
- State: Pennsylvania
- County: Crawford County

Area
  - Total: 35.51 sq mi (91.96 km^{2})
  - Land: 35.24 sq mi (91.26 km^{2})
  - Water: 0.27 sq mi (0.70 km^{2})
- Highest elevation (Mount Joy Church): 1,730 ft (530 m)
- Lowest elevation (French Creek): 1,048 ft (319 m)

Population (2020)
  - Total: 1,409 ▼
  - Estimate (2024): 1,403
  - Density: 42.5/sq mi (16.41/km^{2})
- Time zone: UTC-4 (EST)
  - Summer (DST): UTC-5 (EDT)
- Area code: 814
- FIPS code: 42-039-81736
- Website: www.waynetwpcc.org

Wayne Township is a township in Crawford County, Pennsylvania, United States. The population was 1,409 at the 2020 census, down from 1,539 at the 2010 census.

== Geography ==
Wayne Township is located in southern Crawford County, bordered to the southeast by Venango County and to the south by Mercer County. The borough of Cochranton is along part of the western border of the township. The unincorporated community of Deckard is near the southeastern border.

According to the United States Census Bureau, the township has a total area of 35.5 square miles (92.0 km^{2}), of which 35.3 square miles (91.3 km^{2}) is land and 0.27 square miles (0.7 km^{2}), or 0.76%, is water. French Creek crosses the southwest corner of the township.

== Demographics ==
Historical population
Census	Pop.	Note	%±
2000	1,558		—
2010	1,539		−1.2%
2020	1,409		−8.4%
2024 (est.)	1,403		−0.4%
U.S. Decennial Census

As of the census of 2000, there were 1,558 people, 551 households, and 446 families residing in the township. The population density was 44.5 inhabitants per square mile (17.2/km^{2}). There were 664 housing units at an average density of 19.0/sq mi (7.3/km^{2}). The racial makeup of the township was 99.61% White, 0.13% Pacific Islander, 0.06% from other races, and 0.19% from two or more races. Hispanic or Latino of any race were 0.06% of the population.

There were 551 households, out of which 37.6% had children under the age of 18 living with them, 71.7% were married couples living together, 6.4% had a female householder with no husband present, and 18.9% were non-families. 15.8% of all households were made up of individuals, and 6.5% had someone living alone who was 65 years of age or older. The average household size was 2.82 and the average family size was 3.15.

In the township the population was spread out, with 28.0% under the age of 18, 8.1% from 18 to 24, 28.1% from 25 to 44, 25.4% from 45 to 64, and 10.4% who were 65 years of age or older. The median age was 35 years. For every 100 females, there were 101.6 males. For every 100 females age 18 and over, there were 101.6 males.

The median income for a household in the township was $40,208, and the median income for a family was $45,438. Males had a median income of $32,500 versus $21,012 for females. The per capita income for the township was $17,128. About 7.2% of families and 9.5% of the population were below the poverty line, including 12.4% of those under age 18 and 5.2% of those age 65 or over.
