= Stockton, Wisconsin =

- Town
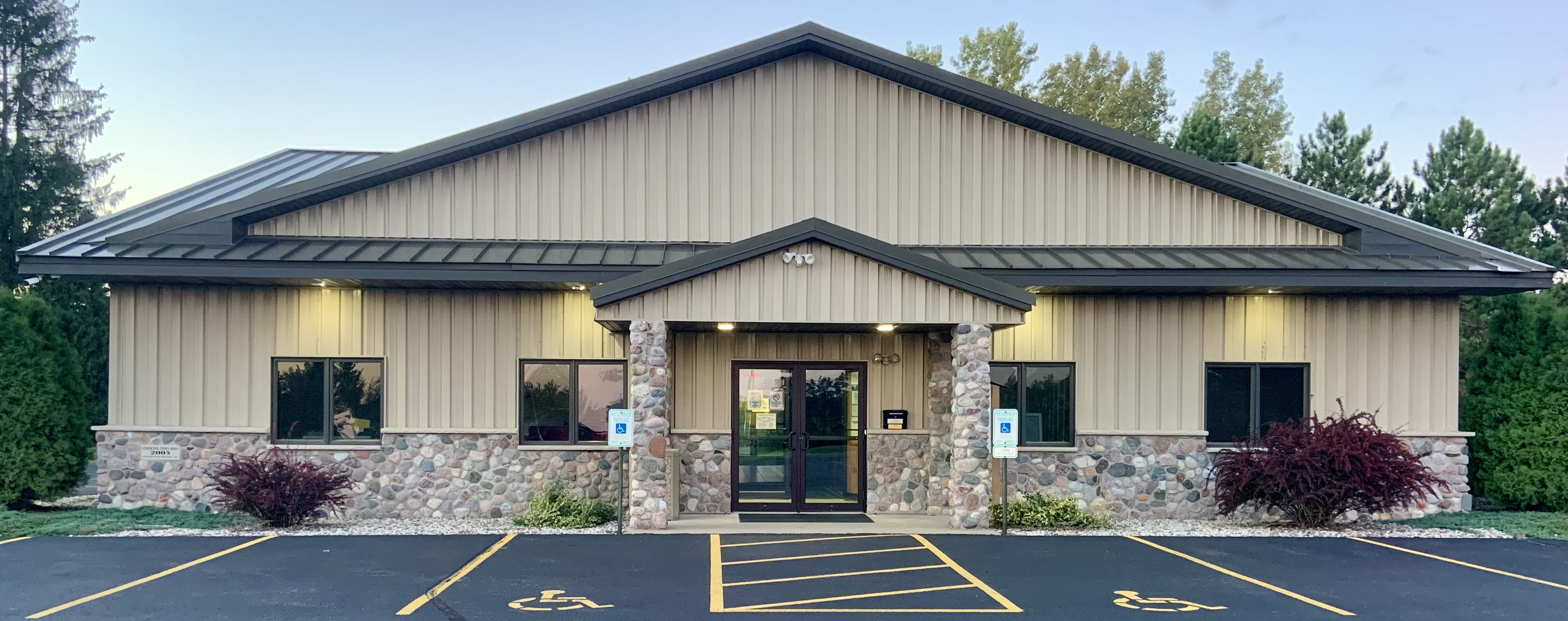
- Town hall

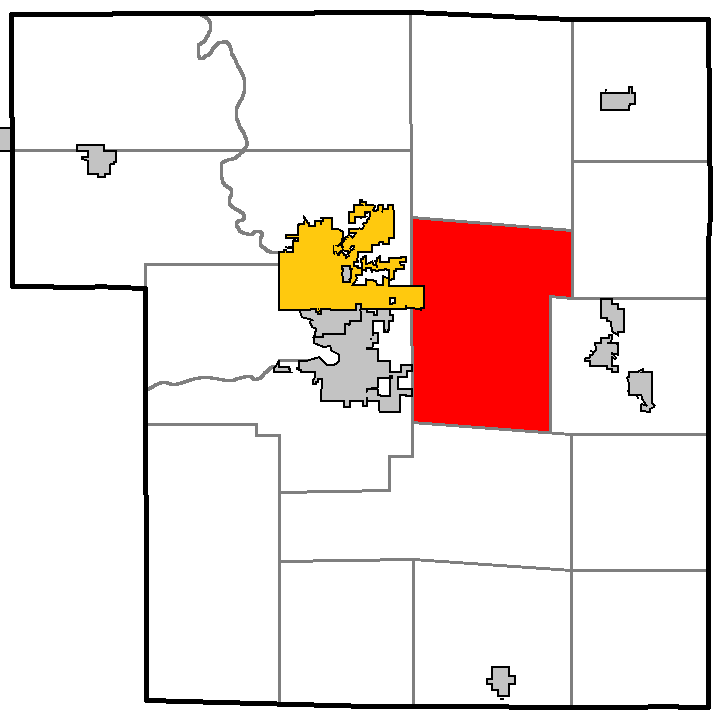
- Location of Stockton, Portage County

- Location of Portage County, Wisconsin
- Coordinates: 44°29′22″N 89°25′3″W
- Country: United States
- State: Wisconsin
- County: Portage

Area
  - Total: 57.8 sq mi (149.8 km^{2})
  - Land: 57.7 sq mi (149.4 km^{2})
  - Water: 0.15 sq mi (0.4 km^{2})
- Elevation: 1,150 ft (350 m)

Population (2020)
  - Total: 3,018
  - Density: 52.32/sq mi (20.20/km^{2})
- Time zone: UTC-6 (Central (CST))
  - Summer (DST): UTC-5 (CDT)
- Area codes: 715 & 534
- FIPS code: 55-77537
- GNIS feature ID: 1584230
- Website: https://townofstockton.wi.gov/

Stockton is a town in Portage County, Wisconsin, United States. The population was 3,018 at the 2020 census. The unincorporated communities of Arnott, Custer, Fancher, and Stockton are located in Stockton.

== Geography ==
According to the United States Census Bureau, the town has a total area of 57.8 square miles (149.8 km^{2}), of which 57.7 square miles (149.4 km^{2}) is land and 0.1 square mile (0.4 km^{2}) (0.24%) is water.

== Demographics ==
As of the census of 2000, there were 2,896 people, 984 households, and 820 families residing in the town. The population density was 50.2 people per square mile (19.4/km^{2}). There were 1,025 housing units at an average density of 17.8 per square mile (6.9/km^{2}). The racial makeup of the town was 97.86% White, 0.21% African American, 0.28% Native American, 0.52% Asian, 0.28% from other races, and 0.86% from two or more races. Hispanic or Latino of any race were 1.21% of the population.

There were 984 households, out of which 40.1% had children under the age of 18 living with them, 73.0% were married couples living together, 5.8% had a female householder with no husband present, and 16.6% were non-families. 11.4% of all households were made up of individuals, and 3.8% had someone living alone who was 65 years of age or older. The average household size was 2.94 and the average family size was 3.20.

In the town, the population was spread out, with 29.1% under the age of 18, 8.0% from 18 to 24, 30.3% from 25 to 44, 24.8% from 45 to 64, and 7.8% who were 65 years of age or older. The median age was 36 years. For every 100 females, there were 111.7 males. For every 100 females age 18 and over, there were 108.7 males.

The median income for a household in the town was $50,957, and the median income for a family was $57,096. Males had a median income of $37,234 versus $23,006 for females. The per capita income for the town was $19,886. About 1.2% of families and 2.8% of the population were below the poverty line, including 2.3% of those under age 18 and 3.9% of those age 65 or over.

== Notable people ==
- Thomas Wesley Anderson, farmer and politician
- William Arnott, farmer and politician
- Leonard A. Groshek, farmer, teacher, and politician

== See also ==
- List of towns in Wisconsin
