= David R. Clements =

American politician

David R. Clements (1819-1884) was a member of the Wisconsin State Assembly during the 1873 and 1874 sessions. Additionally, he was a sheriff and a town board (similar to city council) chairman. He was a Republican. Clements was born on December 14, 1819, in Pinckney, New York. Clements died on September 18, 1884, in Stevens Point, Wisconsin.
