= Charles Couch =

American politician

Charles Couch (March 13, 1833 – November 10, 1911) was an American politician, farm produce and livestock dealer.

Born in Mohawk, New York, Couch moved to Fond du Lac, Wisconsin in 1850 and then to Amherst, Wisconsin in 1857. Couch was a farm produce and livestock dealer. Couch served as the chairman of the Amherst Town Board and town treasurer. He also served on the Portage County, Wisconsin Board of Supervisors and was a Democrat. In 1891 and 1893, Couch served in the Wisconsin State Assembly. He died at his home in Amherst, Wisconsin after being in ill health.
