= Lawrence A. Lamoreux =

American politician

Lawrence A. Lamoreux was a member of the Wisconsin State Assembly.

== Biography ==
Lamoreaux was born on August 14, 1899, in Ashland, Wisconsin. He died on December 26, 1968.

== Career ==
Lamoreux was admitted to the Wisconsin bar in 1924. He was elected to the Assembly in 1928. Additionally, he was a member of the Ashland City Council and Chairman of the Republican Committee of Ashland County, Wisconsin.
