= Benjamin Burr =

American businessman and politician

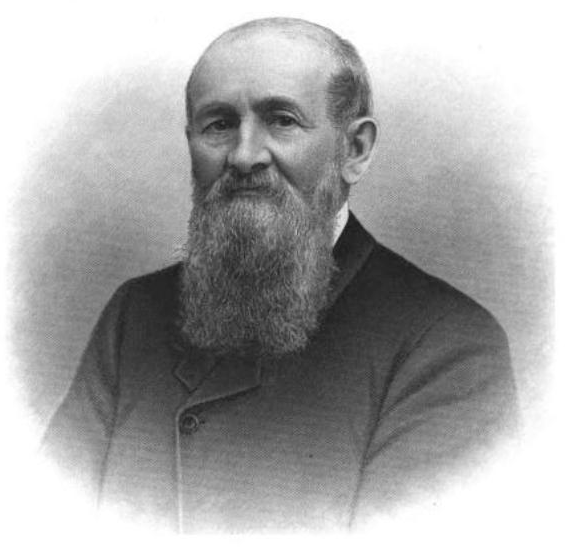

Member of the Wisconsin State Assembly
- In office 1868

Personal details
- Born: April 8, 1818 Rodman, New York
- Died: February 16, 1894 (aged 75) Stevens Point, Wisconsin
- Party: Democratic
- Spouse: Eliza Emmons (m. 1847; died 1884)
- Children: 1
- Occupation: Businessman, politician

Benjamin Burr (April 8, 1818 – February 16, 1894) was an American businessman and politician.

== Biography ==
Benjamin Burr was born in Rodman, Jefferson County, New York on April 8, 1818. He grew up on a farm, and moved to Rochester, New York as a young man. He had a business there, Spencer & Burr, which dealt with wholesale oysters and fruit. He married Eliza Emmons in 1847, and they had one child together.

In 1857, Burr and his wife moved to Stevens Point, Wisconsin. He was in the mercantile and grocery business there, and was president of the International Bank of Amherst. He served as chairman of the Portage County Board of Supervisors, was a member of the Stevens Point Common Council, and was elected to the school board, for which he was the clerk. In 1868, Burr served in the Wisconsin State Assembly as a Democrat.

Burr died of pneumonia at his home in Stevens Point on February 17, 1894.
