= List of Southern Illinois University alumni =

Southern Illinois University Carbondale has had a number of notable alumni since it was first founded in 1869.

== Academics ==
- Robert Coover, T.B. Stowell Adjunct Professor of Literary Arts at Brown University
- Algeania Freeman, academic administrator
- Clara E. Hill, professor of psychology at University of Maryland College Park
- Louise Huffman - teacher and educator on US Antarctic programs
- John L. Koprowski, Dean of the Haub School of Environment 7 Natural Resources University of Wyoming, conservation biologist, Aldo Leopold Memorial Award from The Wildlife Society (M.A. Zoology 1985)
- Sir Curtis Price, KBE, former head of New College, Oxford, former President of the Royal Academy of Music and former president of the Royal Musical Association
- L. Eudora Pettigrew, former president of SUNY Old Westbury, first African-American president in the SUNY system
- Wilfred Reilly - Kentucky State University professor, author of "Hate Crime Hoax," and opponent of the alt-right movement

== Artists ==
- Najjar Abdul-Musawwir, artist
- Shinichi Ishizuka, manga artist
- Mary Manning, photographer
- Roberta Griffith, artist

== Business people ==
- Kenny Troutt, founder of telecommunications company Excel Communications

== Crime ==
- Timothy Krajcir, serial killer

== Entertainers ==
- Jim Belushi, actor/comedian
- Hannibal Buress, stand-up comedian, actor, writer and producer
- Don S. Davis, actor best known for role on Stargate SG-1
- Bil Dwyer, actor, comedian
- Dennis Franz, actor best known for his work on NYPD Blue
- Dick Gregory (attended), actor, author, comedian, activist
- Drake Anthony, YouTuber, best known for videos on chemistry and high voltage.
- Justin Hartley, actor, best known for role on This is Us
- Steve James, documentary director and producer of Sundance award-winning Hoop Dreams and Stevie
- Jenny McCarthy (attended), actress and Playmate of the Year, was studying nursing at SIU when she submitted her photo to Playboy
- Melissa McCarthy, actress, famous for her role in Gilmore Girls and the motion picture Spy
- Gary Miller, ESPN SportsCenter anchor
- Tom Minton, animation producer, writer, artist
- Bob Odenkirk, actor/writer/comedian
- Tim O'Malley, actor/comedian, Godshow, Second City alum
- Rick Rizzs, broadcaster for the Seattle Mariners
- Richard Roundtree, actor, Shaft
- Ken Swofford, film and television actor, best known for Thelma and Louise (1991 film), Murder She Wrote (1984 drama series)
- Robert K. Weiss, producer of The Blues Brothers
- Walt Willey, actor best known for All My Children

== Musicians ==
- Hamiet Bluiett, jazz saxophonist, clarinetist, and composer
- Shawn Colvin, musician, singer
- Lee England Jr., violinist, vocalist, arranger, and composer
- Open Mike Eagle, rapper
- Darryl Jones, bassist of The Rolling Stones
- David Lee Murphy, musician, singer
- Jason Ringenberg, musician, singer
- Mathien, singer, producer

== Politicians and government officials ==
=== Federal government ===
- Roland Burris, former U.S. Senator from Illinois (2009–2010); previously served as Illinois Comptroller and Illinois Attorney General
- Jack Davis, U.S. Congressman from Illinois's 4th Congressional District who served from 1987 to 1989
- William Enyart, U.S. Congressman from Illinois's 12th Congressional District; served from 2013 to 2013; law degree from Southern Illinois University School of Law
- Julio M. Fuentes, circuit judge of the United States Court of Appeals for the Third Circuit
- Tim Lee Hall, U.S. Congressman; represented Illinois's 15th Congressional District from 1975 to 1977
- Donald McHenry, United States ambassador to the United Nations (from 1979 to 1981)
- Brett James McMullen, Retired Brigadier General, United States Air Force
- David D. Phelps, U.S. Congressman from Illinois's 19th congressional district who served from 1999 to 2003
- Glenn Poshard, former U.S. Congressman, gubernatorial candidate, president of SIU
- Larry O. Spencer, Vice Chief of Staff, United States Air Force

=== Statewide officeholders ===
- Randy Daniels, former New York Secretary of State
- Albert E. Mead, former Governor of Washington

=== State legislators ===
- Carl Bearden, member of the Missouri House of Representatives
- Kenneth Buzbee, Democratic member of the Illinois Senate representing the 58th district (1972–1984)
- John Cavaletto, Republican member of the Illinois House of Representatives representing the 107th district (2009–present)
- Jerry Costello II, Democratic member of the Illinois House of Representatives representing the 116th district (2011–present)
- William Davis, Democratic member of the Illinois House of Representatives representing the 30th district (2002–present)
- Chad Hays, Republican member of the Illinois House of Representatives representing the 104th district (2010–present)
- Jeanette Mott Oxford, Democratic member of the Missouri House of Representatives
- Mary Nichols, Democratic member of the Missouri House of Representatives representing the 72nd district (2010–present)
- Lena Taylor, Democratic member of the Wisconsin Senate for the 4th district (since 2005)
- Art Turner, Democratic member of the Illinois House of Representatives (2010–present)
- Kathleen Vinehout, Democratic member of the Wisconsin Senate representing the 31st district (since 2007)
- Grant Wehrli, Republican member of the Illinois House of Representatives representing the 41st district (2015–present)
- Whitney Westerfield, politician
- Marty Joe Murray, Democratic member of the Missouri House of Representatives representing the 78th District (2024–present)

=== Local officeholders ===
- Howard Brookins, Chicago Alderman for the 21st ward
- Forrest Claypool, member of the Cook County Board of Commissioners for District 12 (2002–2006), CEO of Chicago Public Schools
- David Coss, Mayor of Santa Fe, New Mexico (2006–2014)
- Jason Ervin, Chicago Alderman for the 28th ward

=== International figures ===
- Muhammad Ijaz-ul-Haq, Pakistani politician and son of former President General Zia-ul-Haq
- Joe Hung (Master's degree in journalism, 1965), Taiwanese journalist (Central News Agency) and diplomat, Representative of Taiwan to Italy (1993–2000)

== Sports figures ==
=== Baseball ===
- Sam Coonrod, MLB pitcher
- Jim Dwyer, former Major League Baseball outfielder
- Steve Finley, former Major League Baseball center fielder, 5-time Gold Glove winner, 2-time All-Star
- Jason Frasor, Major League Baseball pitcher
- Joe Hall, former Major League Baseball pitcher
- Jerry Hairston Jr., Major League Baseball second baseman
- Dan Hartleb, college baseball coach at Illinois
- Duane Kuiper, former Major League Baseball second baseman, announcer, commentator for EA Sports baseball video games
- Al Levine, Major League Baseball pitcher
- Skip Pitlock, former Major League pitcher
- Derek Shelton, Major League Baseball manager, Pittsburgh Pirates
- Bill Stein, former Major League Baseball infielder
- Dave Stieb, former Major League Baseball pitcher, 7-time All Star
- Taira Uematsu (born 1983), Japanese coach for the San Francisco Giants of Major League Baseball

=== Basketball ===
- Ashraf Amaya, former NBA player
- Chris Carr, former NBA player
- Walt Frazier, Basketball Hall of Famer and named one of the 50 Greatest Players in NBA History
- Mike Glenn, former NBA player
- Bryan Mullins, current Men's Basketball Head Coach
- Nate Hawthorne, former NBA player Los Angeles Lakers and Phoenix Suns
- Troy Hudson, NBA guard
- Joe Meriweather, NBA center

=== Football ===
- Lionel Antoine, former NFL offensive tackle
- Houston Antwine, former NFL defensive lineman
- Tom Baugh, former NFL player
- Amos Bullocks, former NFL running back
- Jeremy Chinn, current NFL safety for the Carolina Panthers
- Madre Harper, current NFL cornerback for the Carolina Panthers
- Jim Hart, former NFL quarterback, 4-time Pro Bowl selection
- Kevin House, former NFL player
- Brandon Jacobs, NFL running back
- Craig James, current NFL cornerback for the Philadelphia Eagles
- Yonel Jourdain, NFL running back for the Buffalo Bills
- Deji Karim, NFL running back for the Jacksonville Jaguars
- Carl Mauck, former NFL player and NFL coach
- Ryan Neal, current NFL safety for the Seattle Seahawks
- MyCole Pruitt, NFL tight end
- Marion Rushing, former NFL linebacker
- Bart Scott, NFL linebacker
- Sam Silas, former NFL lineman
- Russ Smith, former NFL guard
- Sebron Spivey, former NFL wide receiver
- Terry Taylor, former NFL cornerback
- Ernie Wheelwright, former NFL running back
- Adrian White, former NFL safety
- Jan Quarless, former football player and head coach at the SIU Carbondale

=== Other ===
- Ron Ballatore, NCAA championship swimming coach, five-time Olympic swimming coach
- Kim Chizevsky-Nicholls, IFBB professional bodybuilder
- Roger Counsil, NCAA championship gymnastics coach
- Mick Haley, USA Olympic volleyball coach
- Frank Schmitz, four time individual NCAA gymnastics champion and silver medalist at the 1965 Trampoline World Championships
- Cameron Wright, retired high jumper; competed at the 1996 Olympic Games; Southern Illinois University Hall of Fame 2011

== Writers and journalists ==
- Jim Bittermann, CNN European correspondent based in Paris
- Chris Bury, ABC news anchor
- Bill Christine, sports writer and author
- Joan Lovett (Lovelace), CBS four-time Emmy award winner
- Adrian Matejka, poet, finalist for the Pulitzer Prize and National Book Award in poetry
- Michael Meyerhofer, poet and fantasy author
- P.S. Mueller, cartoonist for The New Yorker
- Jason Pargin, fantasy author
- Jared Yates Sexton, author, political commentator, and creative writing professor
- Chad Simpson, Micro Award-winning short and flash fiction author
- Jackie Spinner, writer at the Washington Post and author of Tell Them I Didn't Cry: A Young Journalist's Story of Joy, Loss, and Survival in Iraq

== Others ==
- Matthew F. Hale (Law School, 1998), white supremacist who solicited the murder of federal judge Joan Lefkow
- Joan E. Higginbotham, astronaut
- Rodney P. Kelly, retired Major General, U.S. Air Force
- Thomas McClelland, retired Captain, U.S. Navy
- Johnny R. Miller, Assistant Adjutant General of the Illinois Army National Guard
- Joseph Nechvatal, digital artist and art theoretician
- Michael J. Schwerin, Rear Admiral, U.S. Navy
- Dennis E. Spies, Roman Catholic Auxiliary Bishop of Diocese of Joliet
- Michael Swango, physician and serial murderer
- Mallica Vajrathon, United Nations senior staff member
