= Goyke =

Goyke is a surname. Notable people with the surname include:

- Evan Goyke (born 1982), American attorney, academic, and politician
- Gary Goyke (born 1947), American politician
