= Meyerhofer =

Meyerhofer or Meyerhöfer is a German language habitational surname. Notable people with the name include:

- Lee Meyerhofer (born 1964), American democratic politician
- Marco Meyerhöfer (born 1995), German footballer
- Michael Meyerhofer (born 1977), American writer
