= Nashville Review =

- Discipline: Literary magazine
- Language: English

Publication details
- Publisher: Vanderbilt University (United States)
- Frequency: triannual

Standard abbreviations
- ISO 4: Nashv. Rev.

Links
- Journal homepage

Nashville Review is an online, MFA student-run literary magazine at Vanderbilt University.

A triannual review, Nashville Review publishes fiction, poetry, comics, art, nonfiction, and performance art videos.

Past contributors include Anuradha Bhowmik, Sydney Freeland, Celia Rowlson-Hall, Christopher Citro, Michael Meyerhofer, and Bryan Furuness.
