= Mathien =

American musician (born 1985)

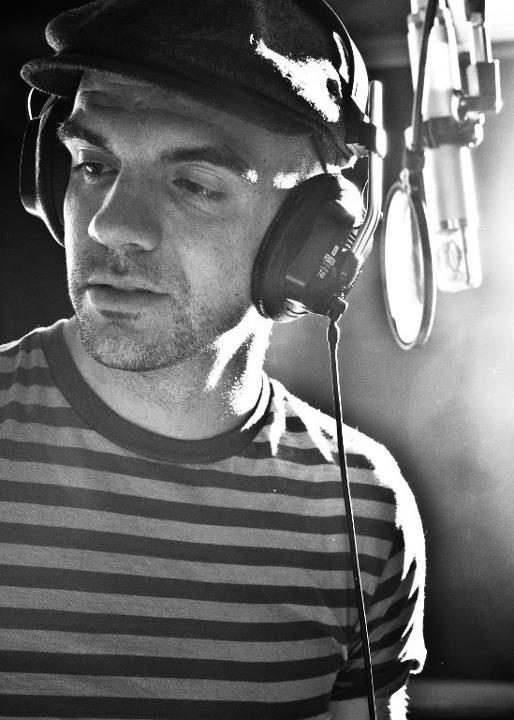
- Chris Mathien of Mathien

Background information
- Also known as: Andy From Art Class
- Origin: Chicago, Illinois
- Genres: Alternative, Pop, Funk, Soul
- Years active: 2002 to present
- Label: WURLITZER CROWLEY RECORDINGS
- Members: Chris Mathien
- Past members: Nick Williams, Brendan Greenstreet, Jason Jones, Jermaine Bollinger, Dave Williamson, Stephanie Starnes, Jake Vozel, Mike Schiff, George Jackson, Aaron Bouslog, Lee England Jr., Peter Cottontale, Erik Kaldahl, Omar Jahwar II, Anthony Perry.
- Website: www.mathien.com

Chris Mathien (born 23 February 1985), known professionally as Mathien, is an American musician from the western suburbs of Chicago.

== History ==
=== Early career ===
After making his first demos during high school on the family computer, Chris started the first live iteration of Mathien at Southern Illinois University Carbondale with trombonist Nick Williams, saxophonist Brendan Greenstreet, drummer Jermaine Bollinger, bassist Jason Jones and Geoff Turner who functioned as a business manager and occasional percussionist during shows.

Mathien wrote, produced and played all the parts on his first album Head, Heart & Hands (2007). After a few line-up changes, Chris recruited bassist Mike Schiff and drummer Aaron Bouslog to embark on multiple Midwest tours.

=== First album and tour ===
In 2009, the group was joined by keyboardist George Jackson after relocating to Chicago, where Mathien signed with Midwest Music Group. Violinist Lee England Jr. also appeared as a guest during the recording of the album Hello Again (2009). To kick off the album and tour, the band played to a packed House of Blues in Chicago. With songs like "Little Richard," "Dirt That I Do," "Goodbye," "Remember," and "We Don't Need to Make Love to Know That We've Got It," the band built a strong fan base and toured extensively throughout 2009 and 2010

2011 brought some changes to the band during the recording of The Night I Was an Alpha Male (2011). George Jackson left and Peter Wilkins joined the band on keyboards. They kicked off the album with a release party at the House of Blues and toured the Midwest. The band also gained traction on college radio stations nationwide, with support from stations like North Central College's WONC-FM in Naperville, IL and Findlay College's WLFC-FM in Findlay, OH, among many others. The title track received heavy airplay, along with songs like "Jamie's Son," "Betaman," "Rub It In," "The Hold," and the crowd favorite "Lettuce Head."

In 2012, the band changed drummers and welcomed Omar Jahwar for the recording of Darling Television. The album was released on May 3, 2013, as a limited run on pink vinyl. The House of Blues show also marked the start of a summer tour, taking the band to new cities and attracting new fans. Some of the lead tracks included "Dames on the Train", "Don't Leave the Light On", "Raw Doggin' Fool" and "Joy". These songs also received airplay on college radio stations like WONC-FM in Naperville and WLFC-FM in Findlay.

=== Solo career focus ===
After touring the Midwest and Southern states through the fall of 2013, Chris continued the project, placing more emphasis on recording albums as a solo artist. He performed at the Metro in Chicago and, shortly thereafter, relocated to Knoxville. There, he began creating material independently, opting not to re-sign with Midwest Music Group. In June 2014, he released a new album, Unique Man.

On February 21, 2016, Chris Mathien released The Freedom Tapes via Spotify, iTunes, Bandcamp and his website. The album's first single, "Wurlitzer Crowley", was accompanied by a music video shot and directed by Mike Habschmidt and it became Mathien's most successful release at the time, currently nearing 3 million streams on Spotify. Later that year, he also dropped an instrumental project titled Knoxvilluminati on Bandcamp, followed by another full-length album, C.A.L.M.. During this period, Mathien expanded his work into film and branded content, partnering with media companies like Very Taste and Two Gents Digital. This led to collaborations with major brands, including Nike, Footaction, Tiffany & Co., Ralph Lauren and Disney.

2017 was another productive year for Mathien. He released DoWhutNah?! in February and shot a video with Very Taste for the song "You Let Me Get Away with It." Later in the year, he briefly relocated to Toronto, CA, where he recorded and released the album Bad Friend. The album produced the Latin-flavored track "Pass the Vino," which went on to surpass 2 million streams on Spotify.

=== Return to Chicago ===
After the release of Bad Friend, Mathien returned to Chicago and began collaborating with local recording artists. He contributed to the debut album Catch by Peter Cottontale, Chance the Rapper's music director and a former Mathien band member. During this time, he also began recording new material while on a short tour in Amsterdam. The sessions for this material resulted in two albums: Good Friend and Shotgun Wedding, both released in 2018. With the help of fellow musician Ryan Wayne Tedder, Mathien formed another live band to perform songs from these albums.

In September 2019, Mathien was joined by the Austin, TX horn section, Soul Food Horns, for a concert opening for Stones Throw recording artist, Benny Sings. That same year, he produced 3 full-length albums; Burn the Friendly, Sincerely and the instrumental album, Opus.

=== COVID recordings ===
During the COVID-19 pandemic, Mathien relentlessly recorded songs and a slew of instrumentals under the newly formed Cole Slaw and Hushpuppy labels based in Amsterdam. This prolific period resulted in eight full-length albums released between 2020 and 2021: Ology, Mr. Charles Meets Mathien Uptown, If You Sing Loudly Enough No One Is Ever Gonna Hear You, Coverboy, Gambit Yugoslav, C'mon Let's Go... I'll Take You Home, OLOGY II and Mathien Forever. These albums spanned a wide range of genres, including reggae, folk, alternative, hip-hop, disco and house.

=== Self-titled album ===
In 2022, Mathien released a self-titled album under Hushpuppy Records. The album featured the popular single "So," a collaboration with folk-R&B artist Sam Hudgens. Following this, Mathien shifted his focus primarily to recording singles, later compiling the strongest material into full albums. One notable single was the instrumental collaboration with Dutch drummer DESH. Released under the NYC-based Etymology label, their track "Get Up and Go" racked up millions of streams on Spotify and remains Mathien's most successful single to date.

=== Return to Atlanta ===
Mathien then relocated to Atlanta, GA, where he built a recording studio in the basement of his home, The Artichoke Ranch. He continues to create albums and has also begun working as a producer for Atlanta artists such as Raury and Naoma. Additionally, Mathien started contributing sounds to Sample Lab with the Top Shelf collective founded by Milwaukee producer Halfspeed. These sounds are royalty-free and available for other producers to use. Around this time, Mathien's music was featured in a Chase Bank commercial and an episode of Grey's Anatomy. In 2024, he released two albums: CALABASAS and sue.

== Discography ==
Album name	Date	Record label
Head, Heart and Hands	November 13, 2007	Alliance Music Entertainment
Hello, Again	June 5, 2009	Midwest Music Group
The Night I was an Alpha Male	August 2, 2011	Midwest Music Group
Darling Television	May 3, 2013	Midwest Music Group
Unique Man	June 16, 2014	Mathien Music Inc
The Freedom Tapes	January 20, 2015	Mathien Music Inc
C.A.L.M.	December 11, 2016	Wurlitzer Crowley Recordings
DoWhutNah?!	February 26, 2017	Wurlitzer Crowley Recordings
Bad Friend	December 16, 2017	Wurlitzer Crowley Recordings
Good Friend	October 9, 2018	Wurlitzer Crowley Recordings
Shotgun Wedding	December 27, 2018	Wurlitzer Crowley Recordings
Opus	March 21, 2019	Wurlitzer Crowley Recordings
Burn The Friendly	June 22, 2019	Wurlitzer Crowley Recordings
Sincerely	November 2, 2019	Wurlitzer Crowley Recordings
Ology	January 12, 2020	Wurlitzer Crowley Recordings
Mr. Charles Meets Mathien Uptown	May 26, 2020	Wurlitzer Crowley Recordings
If You Sing Loudly Enough, No One Is Ever Gonna Hear You	June 6, 2020	Wurlitzer Crowley Recordings
Coverboy	February 2, 2021	Wurlitzer Crowley Recordings
Gambit: Yugoslav	February 23, 2021	Wurlitzer Crowley Recordings
C'mon, Let's Go... I'll Take You Home	March 17, 2021	Wurlitzer Crowley Recordings
OLOGY II	August 20, 2021	Wurlitzer Crowley Recordings
Mathien Forever	September 18, 2021	Wurlitzer Crowley Recordings
Mathien	November 23, 2022	Hushpuppy Records
CALABASAS	February 14, 2024	Wurlitzer Crowley Recordings
sue	September 26, 2024	Wurlitzer Crowley Recordings
