= Thomas McClelland =

United States Navy veteran

Thomas Lee McClelland
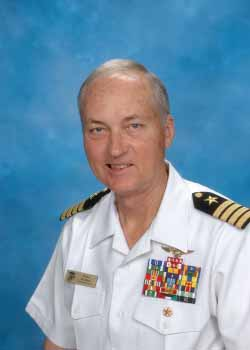
- Captain Thomas L. McClelland, USN (Ret.)
- Born: June 8, 1942 (age 84); Louisville, Kentucky, United States
- Military career
- Allegiance: USA
- Branch: United States Navy
- Service years: 1966–1998
- Rank: Captain
- Nickname: T-Mac
- Unit: NJROTC Admiral Farragut Academy
- Commands: Light Attack Weapons School; VA-97 Warhawks; Carrier Air Wing 9 Amphibious Cargo Ship, USS St. Louis (LKA-116); Amphibious Squadron 5, NJROTC Admiral Farragut Academy
- Conflicts: Vietnam War; Operation Desert Storm
- Awards: Legion of Merit (6); Distinguished Flying Cross (2); Meritorious Service Medal (4); Air Medal (27); Navy Commendation Medal (6); Combat Action Ribbon
- Other work: Admiral Farragut Academy

Thomas McClelland is a decorated U.S. Navy veteran who served in the Vietnam War and Operation Desert Storm.

== Early life and education ==
Thomas McClelland was born on November 23, 1942, in Louisville, Kentucky, and a graduate of Southern Illinois University. He earned his Officer Commission through the Aviation Officer Candidate Program in January 1966 and was designated a Naval Aviator in April 1967. He attended the Naval War College and later earned a master's degree in Business Administration from New Mexico Highlands University.

== Naval career ==
Captain McClelland's sea duty aviation assignments include tours with VA-82, CVW-14, VA-113, VA-97 and CVW-9. He has deployed aboard USS America (CVA-66), USS Coral Sea (CVA-43), USS Enterprise (CVN-65), USS Ranger (CVA-61), USS Carl Vinson (CVN-70), and USS Kitty Hawk (CV-63).

His command tours began in 1980 with the Light Attack Weapons School in Lemoore, California. He has commanded the VA-97 Warhawks, Carrier Air Wing NINE, and the Amphibious Cargo Ship, USS St. Louis (LKA-116), in Sasebo, Japan. His final operational command was during Desert Storm, where he served as Commander, Amphibious Squadron FIVE, conducting advance force operations with the 13th Marine Expeditionary Unit against the Iraqi Army.

Captain McClelland's shore duty assignments include Instructor Pilot and Safety Officer for VA-122 in Lemoore, CA; A-7 Projects Officer at the Naval Weapons Evaluation Facility in Albuquerque, NM; Director of the Technical Support Group for the Director of Naval Warfare in Washington DC; Force Readiness Officer for Commander Naval Air Force, U.S. Pacific Fleet; Deputy and Chief of Staff for the Chief of Naval Education and Training in Pensacola, FL; and his final active duty assignment as Chief of Staff for the Commander in Chief, U.S. Naval Forces Europe, in London, England.

== Post-Naval career and awards ==
Captain McClelland began his second career at Admiral Farragut Academy in 1998, after 32 years of Naval Service. He has earned the following personal awards: Five Legion of Merit Medals, the Distinguished Flying Cross, four Meritorious Service Medals, two Individual Air Medals, 25 Strike/Flight Air Medals, six Navy Commendation Medals, and the Combat Action Ribbon. He has over 4,700 flight hours in 23 different aircraft, over 1,200 carrier landings, and more than 300 combat missions.

== Personal life ==
Captain McClelland resides in St. Petersburg, Florida with his wife, Dona. His son, Charles, teaches biology in Menifee, California and his daughter, Katherine, is a Marketing Project Team Leader for website development company in San Diego, California.

== Flight information ==
Rating: Naval Aviator
Flight hours: More than 4,700
Carrier Landing: More than 1,200
Aircraft flown: 23

== Awards and decorations ==
McClelland's awards include:

== See also ==
- Admiral Farragut Academy
- United States Navy
- Naval Aviation
- List of sea captains
- Notable Alumni of Southern Illinois University
- Captain (naval)
- Captain (United States)
