= 1979 United States House of Representatives elections =

There were two special elections in 1979 to the United States House of Representatives in the 96th United States Congress. Both of them were won by Republicans, filling seats that were vacant since the January 3, 1979 beginning of the term.

== List of elections ==
Elections are listed by date and district.

District	Incumbent			This race	
District	Member	Party	First elected	Results	Candidates
California 11	Leo Ryan	Democratic	1972	Incumbent member-elect was murdered November 18, 1978. New member elected April 3, 1979. Republican gain.	▌ ✓ William Royer (Republican) 57.3%; ▌G. W. Holsinger (Democratic) 41.1%; ▌Nicholas Waeil Kudrovzeff (American Independent) 0.8%; ▌Wilson Branch (Peace & Freedom) 0.8%
Wisconsin 6	William A. Steiger	Republican	1966	Incumbent member-elect died December 4, 1978. New member elected April 3, 1979. Republican hold.	▌ ✓ Tom Petri (Republican) 50.4%; ▌Gary Goyke (Democratic) 49.6%
