= Antonio R. Riley =

American politician

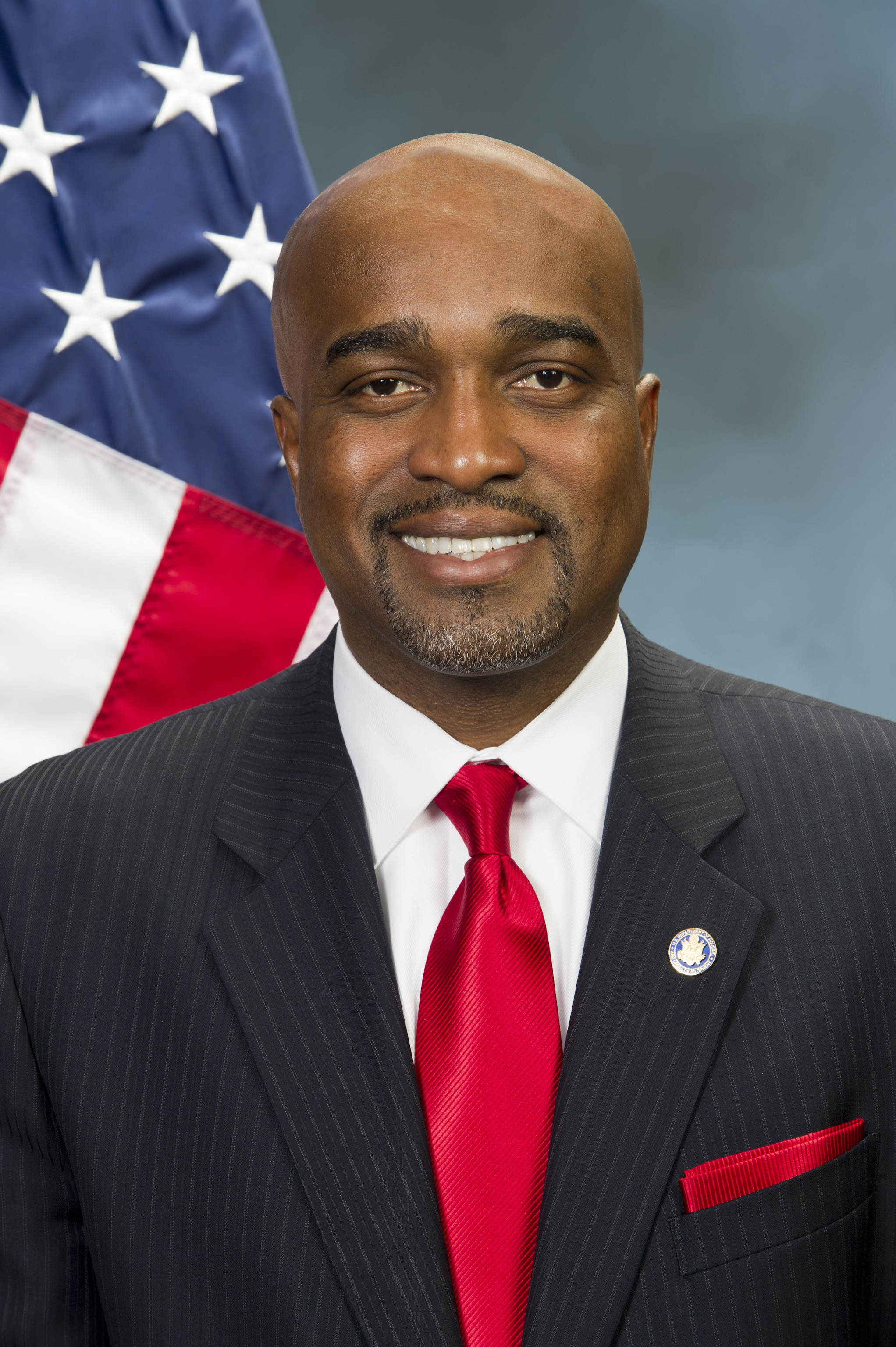
- Riley's official portrait as Midwest Regional Administrator

Midwest Regional Administrator of the Department of Housing and Urban Development
- In office October 2010 – January 2017

Member of the Wisconsin State Assembly from the 18th district
- In office January 4, 1993 – January 28, 2003
- Preceded by: Marcia P. Coggs
- Succeeded by: Lena Taylor

Personal details
- Born: August 22, 1963 (age 63) Chicago, Illinois
- Party: Democratic

Antonio R. Riley (born August 22, 1963) is an American politician from Wisconsin.

Riley served as the Midwest Regional Administrator of the United States Department of Housing and Urban Development from October 2010 through January 2017, and previously as a former member of the Wisconsin State Assembly.

== Biography ==
Riley was born on August 22, 1963, in Chicago, Illinois. He graduated from Riverside University High School in Milwaukee, Wisconsin, and Carroll College. Riley has served on the boards of the Milwaukee chapters of the YMCA and the American Red Cross.

Riley became part of Talossan history when on April 20, 1982, he facetiously signed the Treaty of Milwaukee as the "United States Ambassador to Talossa", "ceding" lands to Talossa and "recognising" its sovereignty.

== Career ==
Riley was first elected to the Wisconsin State Assembly in 1992. He served the 18th District for ten years until February 1, 2003. Prior to assuming his current role, Riley was Executive Director of the Wisconsin Housing and Economic Development Authority. Riley is a Democrat.

In November 2020, Riley was named a volunteer member of the Joe Biden presidential transition Agency Review Team to support transition efforts related to the Department of Housing and Urban Development and the Federal Housing Finance Agency.
