= 2020 Milwaukee mayoral election =

- April 7, 2020
- Turnout: 30.99%
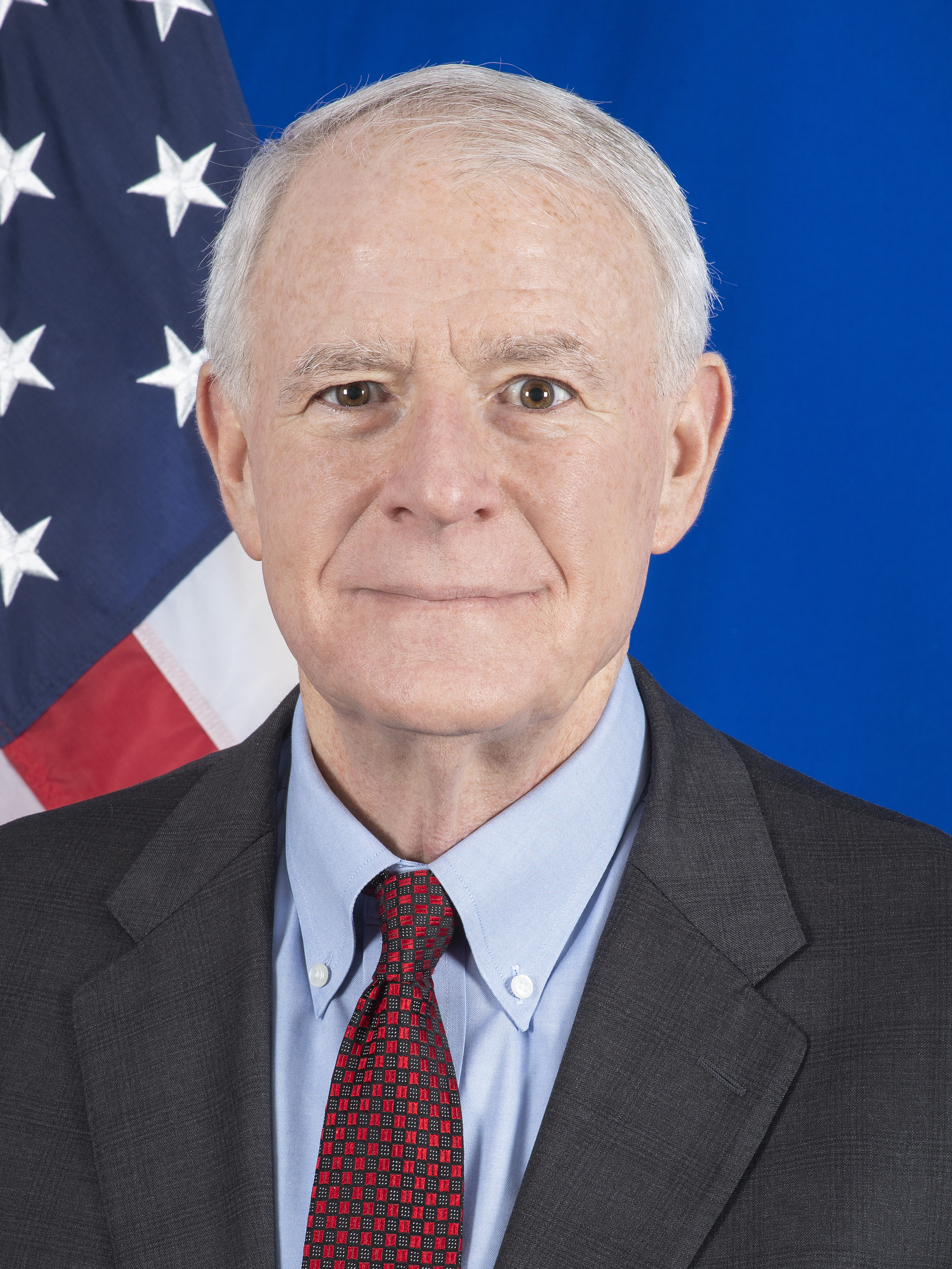

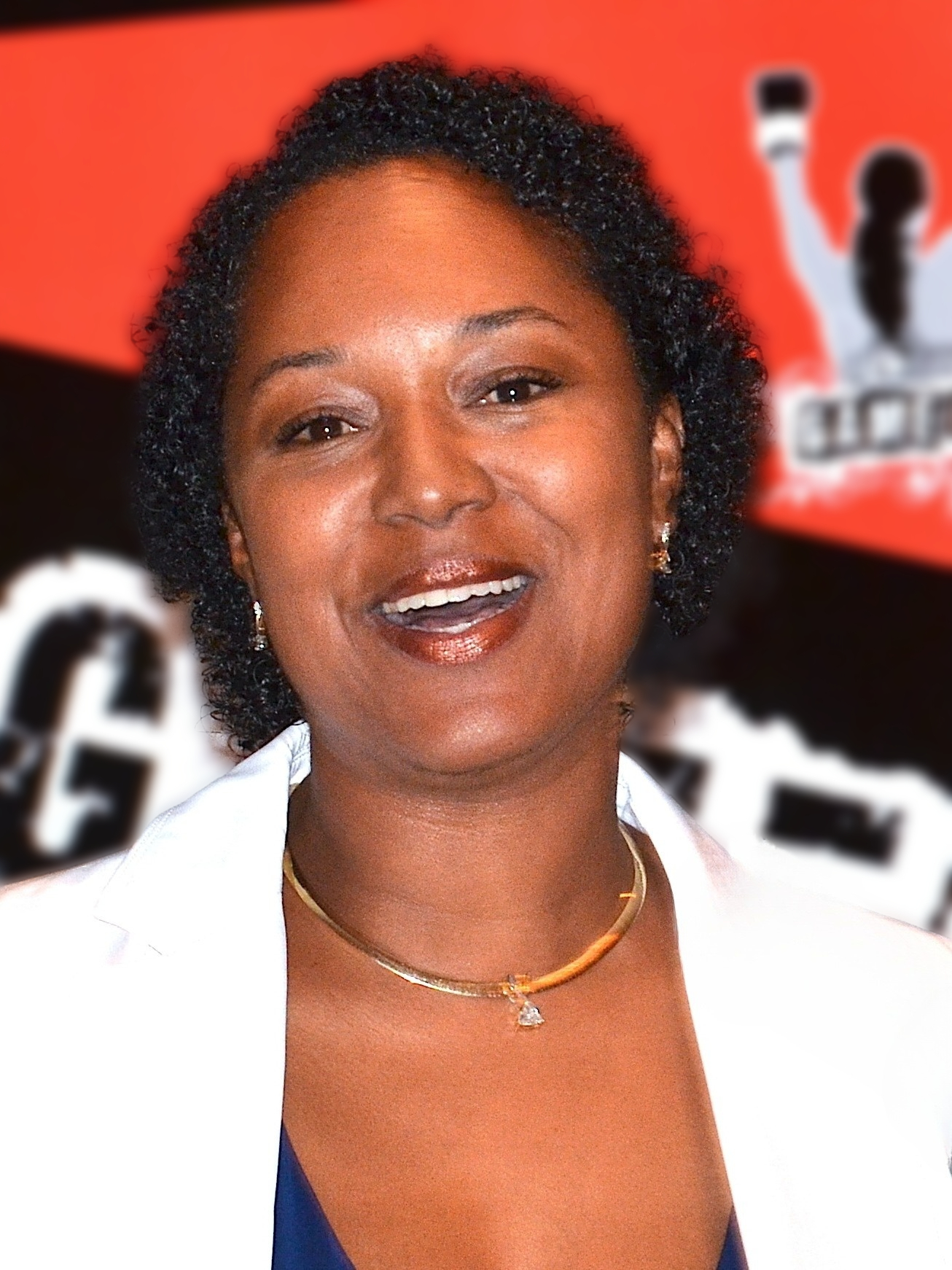
Candidate	Tom Barrett	Lena Taylor
Popular vote	57,492	33,572
Percentage	62.55%	36.87%
Mayor before election
Tom Barrett
Elected mayor
Tom Barrett

The 2020 Milwaukee mayoral election was held on Tuesday, April 7, 2020, concurrent with Wisconsin's Spring general election and presidential preference primary. Incumbent mayor Tom Barrett won his fifth four-year term as mayor of Milwaukee, receiving 62% of the vote against state senator Lena Taylor.

Municipal elections in Wisconsin are non-partisan, but both general election candidates in this case were members of the Democratic Party of Wisconsin. A non-partisan primary was held on Tuesday, February 18, 2020, in which the top two vote-getters advanced to the April general election.

This election was also significantly affected by the COVID-19 pandemic in Wisconsin.

== Primary election ==
=== Candidates ===
==== On ballot ====
- Tom Barrett, incumbent mayor
- Paul Rasky
- Lena Taylor, State Senator from the 4th District
- Tony Zielinski, alderman from the 14th district

===== Write-in candidates =====
- David D. King, candidate for District 9 Milwaukee city councilor in 2016
- Ramone Williams

==== Withdrawn or rejected ====
- Daniel Crowley
- Theresa Garner
- David D. King, candidate for District 9 Milwaukee city councilor in 2016 subsequently ran as write-in
- Tremell Noble, applicant to fill the Milwaukee County Sheriff vacancy in 2017
- Ramone Williams subsequently ran as write-in

==== Declined ====
- Ashanti Hamilton, Milwaukee Common Council president

=== Endorsements ===
Tom Barrett

Newspapers

- Shepherd Express

Organizations

- Sierra Club Great Waters Group
Tony Zielinski

Individuals

- Alexander Ayala, former president of the Milwaukee Chapter of the National Latino Peace Officers’ Association
- Dale Boremann Jr., president of the Milwaukee Police Association
- Danilo Cardenas, president of the Milwaukee Chapter of the National Latino Law Enforcement Organization
- Jerome Smith, pastor
- Ray Vahey, community activist
- Steve Williams, co-founder and publisher of the Blue Book Milwaukee

Organizations

- International Association of Firefighters Local 215
- Milwaukee Deputy Sheriffs’ Association
- Milwaukee Police Association
- Milwaukee Police Supervisors’ Organization
- National Latino Law Enforcement Organization

=== Polls ===
Poll source	Date(s) administered	Sample size	Margin of error	Tom Barrett	Paul Rasky	Lena Taylor	Tony Zielinski	Other	Undecided
Remington Research Group	November 2019			41%	–	22%	22%	–	15%

Hypothetical polling

Poll source	Date(s) administered	Sample size	Margin of error	Tom Barrett	Ashanti Hamilton	Tony Zielinski	Undecided
Remington Research Group	December 3–4, 2018	889	± 3.3%	42%	19%	23%	16%

=== Results ===
2020 Milwaukee mayoral primary
Candidate	Votes	%
Tom Barrett (incumbent)	33,151	50.01%
Lena Taylor	20,347	30.69%
T. Anthony Zielinski	10,385	15.67%
Paul Rasky	1,902	2.87%
David D. King (write-in)	225	0.34%
Ramone Williams (write-in)	10	0.02%
Others (write-in)	274	0.41%
Total votes	66,294	100%

== General election ==
A general election was held April 7 between Tom Barrett and Lena Taylor.

Taylor was the first African American woman to advance to a general election for mayor of Milwaukee, and only the second woman (after Donna Horowitz Richards, who advanced to the 1984 general election).

Barret's campaign was largely focused on his track record. Taylor challenged his track record, arguing that people of color had not sufficiently benefited from during tenure.

=== Impact of the COVID-19 pandemic ===
On March 23, citing concerns of the COVID-19 pandemic in the United States, Mayor Barrett sent a letter to Governor Tony Evers, State Senate Majority Leader Scott L. Fitzgerald and Speaker of the State House Robin Vos, requesting that the April 7 elections (including the mayoral election, as well as Wisconsin's presidential primaries and others races) be conducted using mail-in ballots only.

City officials urged voters not to vote in person and to instead vote by mail with absentee ballots. On March 31, Milwaukee Election Commission Executive Director Neil Albrecht announced that rather than the usual 180 voting sites, the election will instead have only between ten and twelve in-person voting sites. This was due to a severe lack of poll workers. By April 3, the number of in-person polling places was further reduced to only five. Ultimately, 96,712 absentee ballots were requested, and 77,729 were returned (it is not yet reported how many are valid).

On April 1, Judge William M. Conley ruled that, due to the circumstances of the elections, absentee ballots would be allowed to be returned until April 13, despite the elections taking place on April 7. Days after, the Republican National Committee urged the Supreme Court of the United States to block this ruling. He also removed the requirement for ballots to have witness signatures, citing difficulties with regards to individuals living alone during the stay-at-home order being unable to find a witness. The Supreme Court of the United States, on April 6, overturned Conley's ruling, meaning that all absentee ballots must be turned in by the election day, and ballots without witness signatures would be invalidated. However, the Supreme Court of the United States did not overturn Conley's ruling that results would not be reported until April 13.

Governor Evers, in early April, urged the state legislature to postpone the April 7 elections in Wisconsin. However, the legislature did not take the action to do this. Despite admitting that he would violate the law by doing so, on April 6, Evers issued an executive order which, if enforced, would have postponed the April 7 elections until the tentative date of June 7. Republican leaders immediately announced that they would challenge the order in the Wisconsin Supreme Court. The Wisconsin Supreme Court ruled that Evers did not have the authority to postpone the elections, thus meaning that Evers' executive order was nullified, and that the elections would be held as scheduled on April 7.

On April 4, Lena Taylor filed a lawsuit attempting to get the mayoral election moved to September 8.

By the time the Election Day voting concluded, Milwaukee Election Commissioner Neil Albrecht stated that despite some of the problems, the in-person voting ran smoothly.

=== Candidates ===
- Tom Barrett, incumbent mayor
- Lena Taylor, State Senator from the 4th District

=== Endorsements ===
Tom Barrett

Officeholders

- Tim Carpenter, Wisconsin State Senator
- John T. Chisholm, Milwaukee County District Attorney
- La Tonya Johnson, Wisconsin State Senator
- Herb Kohl, former United States Senator from Wisconsin

Individuals

- Randy Bryce, ironworker and 1st congressional district Democratic nominee in 2018

Newspapers

- Shepherd Express

Organizations

- Human Rights Campaign
- IBEW Local 494
- Milwaukee Area Labor Council
- Milwaukee Building & Construction Trades Council
- NAIOP Commercial Real Estate Development Association
- Teamsters Local 200 and Local 344
- Sierra Club Great Waters Group
- United Auto Workers SE WI CAP
- United Steelworkers District 2
- Wisconsin Muslim Civic Alliance
- Wisconsin Progress

=== Polls ===
Poll source	Date(s) administered	Sample size	Margin of error	Tom Barrett	Lena Taylor	Undecided
Remington Research Group	November 2019	–	–	51%	27%	22%

Hypothetical polling

Hamilton vs. Zielinski

Poll source	Date(s) administered	Sample size	Margin of error	Ashanti Hamilton	Tony Zielinski	Undecided
Remington Research Group	December 3–4, 2018	889	± 3.3%	39%	34%	27%

=== Results ===
77,729 mail-in ballots were returned, and 18,803 in-person votes were cast in the city of Milwaukee.

2020 Milwaukee mayoral general election
Candidate	Votes	%
Tom Barrett (incumbent)	57,492	62.55%
Lena Taylor	33,572	36.52%
Others (write-in)	852	0.93%
Total votes	91,916	100%

== See also ==
- 2020 Wisconsin elections
