= Tamara Grigsby =

American politician (1974–2016)

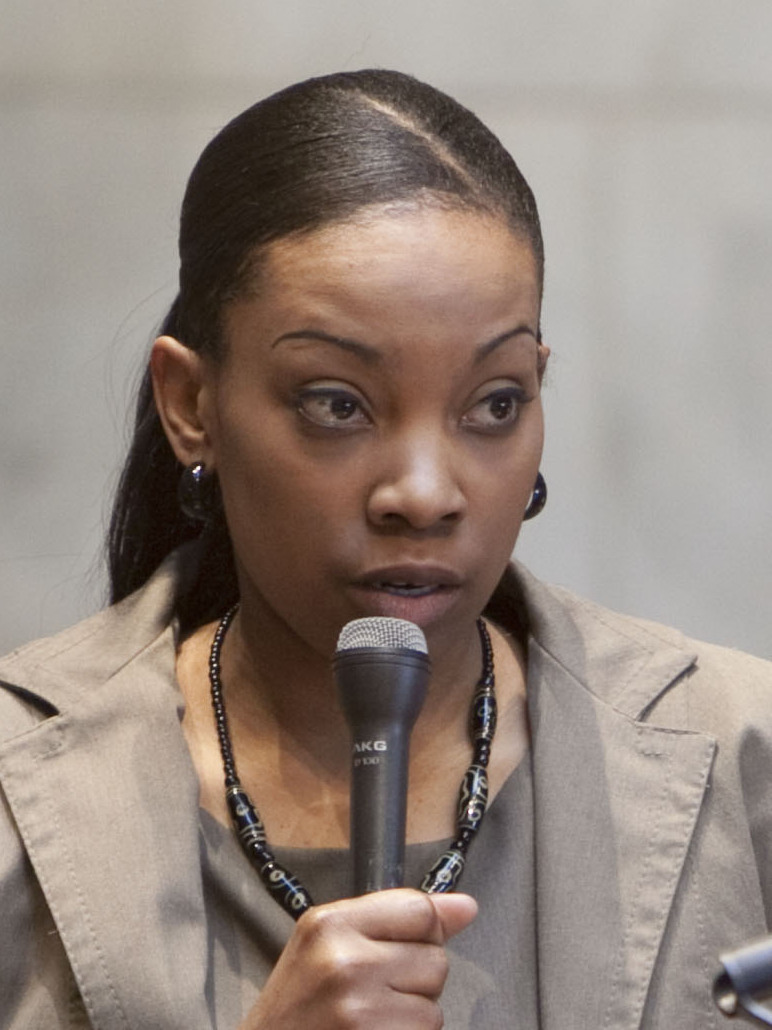
- Grigsby in 2009

Member of the Wisconsin State Assembly from the 18th district
- In office January 3, 2005 – January 7, 2013
- Preceded by: Lena Taylor
- Succeeded by: Evan Goyke

Personal details
- Born: November 19, 1974 Pullman, Washington, U.S.
- Died: March 14, 2016 (aged 41) Madison, Wisconsin, U.S.
- Party: Democratic
- Education: Howard University (BA); University of Wisconsin–Madison (MSW)
- Profession: Social worker, university professor

Tamara D. Grigsby (November 19, 1974 – March 14, 2016) was an American social worker, academic, and politician who served as a member of the Wisconsin State Assembly by representing the 18th Assembly District from 2005 until 2013.

== Early life and education ==
Born in Pullman, Washington, Grigsby graduated from James Madison Memorial High School in Madison, Wisconsin. She received her bachelor's degree from Howard University and received her master's degree from University of Wisconsin–Madison in social work.

== Career ==
Grigsby taught at University of Wisconsin–Milwaukee, Carroll University, and Cardinal Stritch University and was a social worker and family counselor.

Grigsby was first elected to the Assembly in 2004 to succeed fellow Democrat Lena Taylor, winning the September Democratic primary election by an absolute majority (3,231 votes to 1,820 for her two opponents), and facing no opposition in the general election. She was assigned to the standing committees on children and families; criminal justice and homeland security; on public health; and on tourism. 2008 and 2010.

== Illness and death ==
Grigsby's staff announced on December 22, 2011, that she was hospitalized in intensive care, battling cancer. In April 2012, Grigsby announced she would be retiring from the Assembly to recover her strength. She died on March 14, 2016, in Madison, Wisconsin.
