= Najjar Abdul-Musawwir =

American painter

- Born: 25 October 1958 (age 67); Chicago, Illinois
- Education: Southern Illinois University (MFA)
- Occupations: artist; professor
- Years active: 1992-present

Najjar Abdul-Musawwir (born October 25, 1958) is an African-American artist and professor of studio art and art history. His work has been exhibited around the world, including in the United States, Europe, Africa, and Asia. He teaches in Southern Illinois University Carbondale's School of Art and Design.

== Early life and education ==
Najjar Abdul-Musawwir grew up outside Chicago, Illinois in the suburb of Harvey. He recalls first being impressed by amateur art done by his father and cousin when he was around seven or eight years old. But the moment he fell in love with art was in fourth grade, after a school art project involving layering black over other colors in a crayon drawing, then scratching away the black to reveal colors underneath. He has compared that moment to "a scientist discovering penicillin."

In high school, Abdul-Musawwir was bussed to a majority-white school, Thornridge High School in Dolton, Illinois, where he spent his time on the gymnastics team, where he was a gold medalist, and in the library, where he read art books. However, in both these areas, he was the target of racism. His own art was sometimes destroyed, leading his teachers to believe he wasn't doing his homework. He also experienced racism on the gymnastics team, where his teammates would defecate on his clothing. Finally, he dropped out of school.

After leaving school, Abdul-Musawwir ended up committing a crime and served nine years in prison. While incarcerated, he became friends with a Muslim inmate who noticed that Abdul-Musawwir illustrated cards for fellow inmates to send their families. That man encouraged Abdul-Musawwir to study art as well as to improve his reading skills; at this time Abdul-Musawwir realized he was functionally illiterate. He realized the importance of knowledge to survival and spend his years in prison reading and studying art. He began reading the dictionary every day to improve his vocabulary and ultimately earned his GED while in prison. Some of his teachers in the prison worked at Southern Illinois University, who encouraged him to pursue his undergraduate degree there after he was released. He took their advice, and in his senior year, he earned the Rickert Ziebold Trust Award, which is the university's most prestigious award for art students, awarded to graduating seniors. He earned his Master of Fine Arts, also at Southern Illinois University Carbondale, in 1997.

== Career ==
Abdul-Musawwir's primary art forms are painting and drawing, and he works in the styles of abstract art, abstract expressionism, and realism. His art reflects his identity as a Muslim and an African-American as well as his interest in Islamic, African, and African-American art history. One of his major influences was WSIU instructor Robert Paulson. Abdul-Musawwir said, "If there was anyone who taught me how to paint, and to see, and to appreciate color, it was Bob Paulson." Another influential teacher was Larry Bernstein.

Abdul-Musawwir is a professor at Southern Illinois University Carbondale, where in 2009 he was awarded the distinguished Judge William Holmes Cook Professorship Endowment.

In 2011, Abdul-Musawwir was invited to serve on Illinois governor Pat Quinn's Muslim American Advisory Council. He has also served on the board of the Illinois Association of Museums.

== Exhibitions ==
Abdul-Musawwir's has appeared in galleries and exhibitions in the United States, Europe, Africa, and Asia, including:

- One piece in the exhibition "Visions of Our 44th President," which toured around the U.S. and became part of the permanent collection of the Charles H. Wright Museum of African American History (2012)
- Solo exhibit “Harvesting an Artist's Mind: Paintings and Drawings by Najjar” at the Surplus Gallery (2011)
- Solo exhibit, "Muhammad Speaks: Preserving an American Voice," and residency at Tuanku Fauziah Museum and Gallery, University of Science, Malaysia (2011)
- Solo exhibit "From Chains to Change," at the Carbondale Civic Center Corridor Gallery and co-sponsored by the African American Museum of Southern Illinois (2009)
- Solo exhibit at Bilkent University in Ankara, Turkey (2008)

== Media references and appearances ==
Abdul-Musawwir was the host of the television show Expressions, in which he interviewed artists such as Chintia Kirana, Craig Rhodes, Lewis Pruneau, Mike Faris about their work and lives. It aired for six seasons on PBS affiliate WSIU-TV, ending in 2017. In the December 12, 2012 episode, Abdul-Musawwir was the featured artist and was interviewed by guest host Jak Tichenor.

A short documentary, From State Prison to State Professor, about Abdul-Musawwir's life, screened at the 2018 Pan African Film Festival in California. The film was directed by Joshua Jackson and starred Abdul-Musawwir, Christopher Summers, Simeon Frierson, and Michael Key, Jr.

== Personal life ==
He has four daughters and is married to Khaleelah.
