= Margaret Arney =

21st century American politician

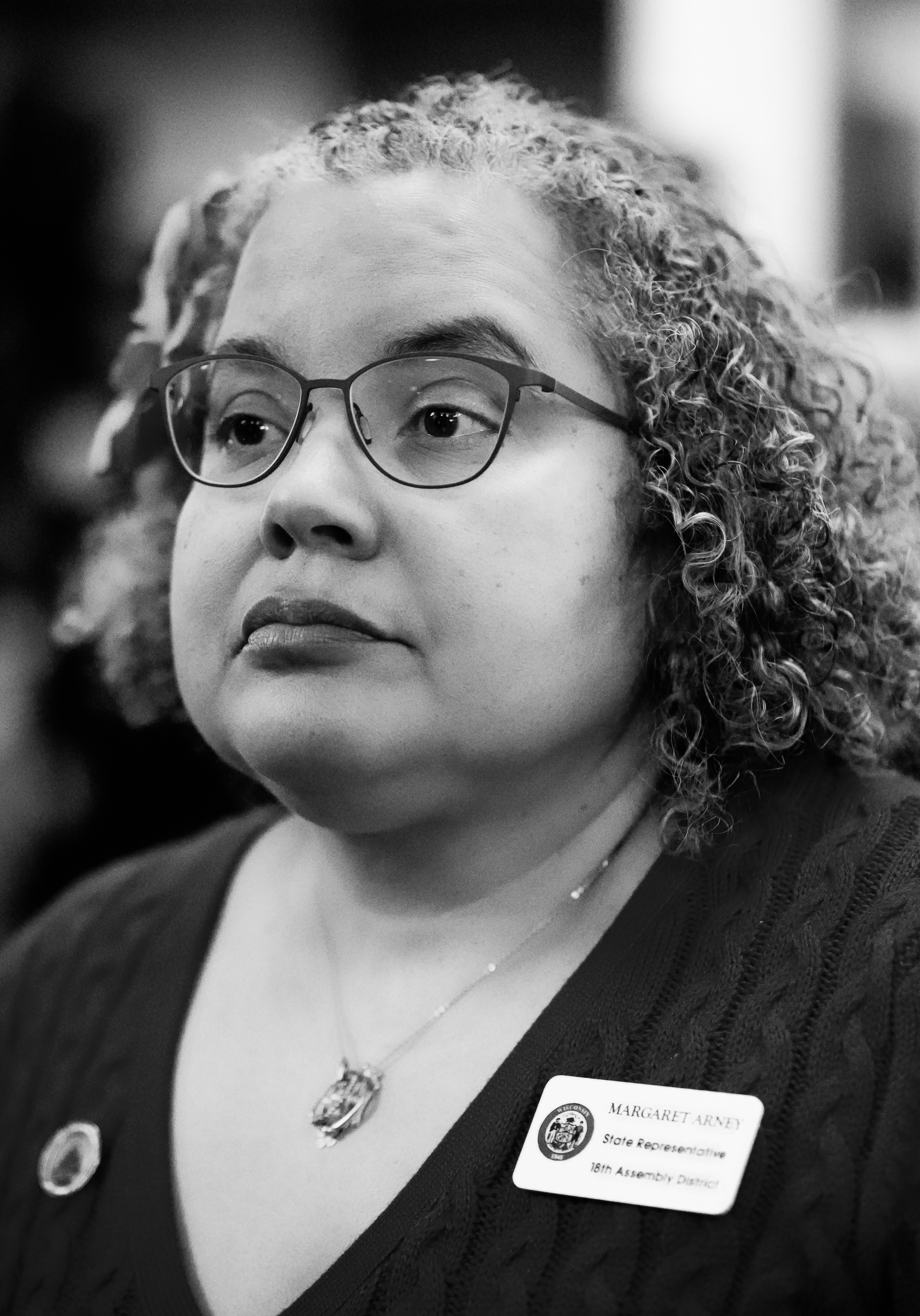
- Arney in 2026

Member of the Wisconsin State Assembly from the 18th district
- Incumbent
- Assumed office January 6, 2025
- Preceded by: Evan Goyke

Member of the Common Council of Wauwatosa, Wisconsin, from the 2nd district
- In office April 2022 – April 2026 Serving with Brad Foley
- Preceded by: Kathleen Causier

Personal details
- Born: Margaret Michele Tully; June 17, 1969 (age 57) Milwaukee, Wisconsin, U.S.
- Party: Democratic
- Spouse: Michael P. Arney
- Children: 1
- Education: Harvard University (B.A.); University of Chicago School of Social Service Administration (M.A.)
- Website: Campaign website

Margaret Michele Arney (née Tully; born June 17, 1969) is an American nonprofit consultant, educator, and Democratic politician from Milwaukee County, Wisconsin. She is a member of the Wisconsin State Assembly, representing Wisconsin's 18th Assembly district since 2025. She served on the city council of Wauwatosa, Wisconsin, from 2022 to 2026. She was Wauwatosa's first African American city councilmember.

== Biography ==
Margaret Arney was born Margaret Michele Tully in Milwaukee, Wisconsin, in June 1969. She was raised and educated in Milwaukee, graduating from Rufus King High School in 1987. She went on to attend Harvard University, and earned her bachelor's degree in government studies in 1991. She continued her education at the University of Chicago School of Social Service Administration, and completed her master's of social service administration in 1994.

After completing her graduate studies, she remained in Chicago working for Chicago Commons until 2000, when she returned to Milwaukee. Over the next decade she worked in fundraising and market research for several local nonprofits, including the YWCA and the Milwaukee Art Museum. In 2010, she was hired by Cardinal Stritch University to administer their African American Leadership Program and remained at that job for the next decade. During those years, she also began teaching a course on social work at nearby Concordia University Wisconsin, and worked as a consultant to the African American Leadership Alliance of Milwaukee.

== Political career ==
Arney made her first run for elected office in 2010, when she sought a seat on the city council of Wauwatosa, Wisconsin. She came in second in the nonpartisan primary and advanced to the general election, but lost to Kathleen Causier by a wide margin.

Arney did not run for office again until 2022. In the intervening years, Arney was active in local and civic affairs. In 2016, she was a founding member of the social justice group Tosa Together. By 2022 she had become president of the Wauwatosa Neighborhood Association Council.

In 2022, Kathleen Causier retired from the city council and Arney ran again to succeed her as 2nd district alderperson. This time she faced no opposition and took office in April 2022, becoming the first African American member of the Wauwatosa Common Council.

In 2024, Arney's state representative, Evan Goyke, was elected city attorney of Milwaukee and therefore would not run for re-election to the Wisconsin State Assembly in 2024. Arney announced in April 2024 that she would run to succeed Goyke in the 18th state Assembly district. The 18th district comprises the southeast corner of Wauwatosa along with several neighborhoods of Milwaukee's west side; it was one of only two Assembly districts left unchanged by the 2024 redistricting act. The district was heavily Democratic; Arney faced a Democratic primary against perennial candidate Angela Kennedy, but won by a substantial margin. She went on to win a landslide in the general election, defeating Republican Kevin Anderson with 82% of the vote.

== Personal life and family ==
Margaret Arney is a daughter of Andrew and Maria Tully.

Margaret Tully took the last name Arney when she married Michael Arney. They have one adult daughter.

== Electoral history ==
=== Wisconsin Assembly (2024) ===
Year	Election	Date	Elected				Defeated				Total	Plurality
2024	Primary	Aug. 13	Margaret Arney	Democratic	4,238	64.92%	Angela Kennedy	Dem.	2,274	34.83%	6,528	1,964
2024	General	Nov. 5	Margaret Arney	Democratic	20,801	82.19%	Kevin Anderson	Rep.	4,431	17.51%	25,308	16,370

Wisconsin State Assembly
Preceded by Evan Goyke	Member of the Wisconsin State Assembly from the 18th district January 6, 2025 – present	Incumbent
