= Gary Goyke =

American politician (born 1947)

Member of the Wisconsin Senate from the 19th district
- In office January 6, 1975 – January 3, 1983
- Preceded by: William Draheim
- Succeeded by: Michael Ellis

Personal details
- Born: May 9, 1947 (age 79) Oshkosh, Wisconsin, U.S.
- Party: Democratic
- Children: 2, including Evan Goyke
- Education: Saint Mary's University
- Occupation: Politician, lobbyist, nonprofit executive

Gary R. Goyke (born May 9, 1947) is an American lobbyist, nonprofit executive, and former politician from Oshkosh, Wisconsin. A member of the Democratic Party, he served eight years in the Wisconsin Senate, representing Wisconsin's 19th Senate district from 1975 to 1983. After leaving elected office, he founded a Wisconsin lobbying firm known as Goyke and Associates, and now serves as chair of the nonprofit Clean Wisconsin Action Fund.

Goyke began his political career as a volunteer and campaign staffer for Hubert Humphrey, working for his 1968 presidential campaign, his 1970 U.S. Senate campaign, and working as a national youth coordinator for his 1972 presidential campaign. He also ran unsuccessfully for U.S. House of Representatives in 1979 and 1980.

His son, Evan Goyke, also served in the Wisconsin Legislature and currently serves as city attorney of Milwaukee.

== Early life and education ==
Goyke was born and raised in Oshkosh, Wisconsin. He graduated from Oshkosh's Lourdes Academy in 1965 and went on to attend the University of Minnesota. He transferred to Saint Mary's University, in Winona, Minnesota, where he obtained his bachelor's degree in 1970.

== Political career ==
While in college at Saint Mary's, Goyke became active in politics with the Minnesota Democratic–Farmer–Labor Party; he served as chairman of the Young Democrats of Minnesota's 1st congressional district and was student body president at Saint Mary's. He was a supporter and campaign volunteer for Vice President Hubert Humphrey in his 1968 presidential campaign, then worked for Humphrey's successful 1970 United States Senate campaign.

After graduating from college in 1970, Goyke moved back to Oshkosh, Wisconsin, and worked as an assistant manager of a pizza restaurant. But when Humphrey made another bid for the presidency in 1972, Goyke was hired as the national director of Youth for Humphrey, and worked for Humphrey in several of the 1972 Democratic primary states.

Goyke was elected to the Senate in 1974 and was re-elected in 1978. In 1979, he was a candidate for the United States House of Representatives from Wisconsin's 6th congressional district in a special election following the death of William A. Steiger. He lost to Tom Petri. The following year, he ran again and lost again to Petri. Goyke remained in the Wisconsin Senate until 1983. During his time in office, Goyke served as the chair of several committees and subcommittees, including Education and State Institutions and Banking and Insurance.

== Later years ==
After leaving office, Goyke founded a lobbying firm in Madison known as Goyke and Associates, and had a successful lobbying career. Later he became chair of the environmentally-focused nonprofit Clean Wisconsin Action Fund.

== Personal life ==
Goyke is a member of the Fourth Degree of the Knights of Columbus. Additionally, he is a member of the Benevolent and Protective Order of Elks, the Fraternal Order of Eagles, the League of Women Voters, the Sierra Club and the Young Men's Christian Association. He is married with two sons. In November 2012, one of his sons, Evan Goyke, was elected to the Wisconsin State Assembly from the 18th district.

== See also ==
- The Political Graveyard
