= Ron Ballatore =

American swimming coach (1941–2012)

Biographical details
- Born: 1941; Chicago, Illinois, U.S.
- Died: April 27, 2012 (aged 70–71); Gainesville, Florida, U.S.
- Education: Southern Illinois University

Playing career
- 1958–1962: Southern Illinois University (All American Honors)
- Position: Breaststroke

Coaching career (HC unless noted)
- 1967–1978: Pasadena City College
- 1978–1994: UCLA
- 1994–1996: Brown
- 1996–1999: Florida

Accomplishments and honors

Championships
- NCAA Championship (1982)

Awards
- Pac-10 Coach of the Year (1981, 1982, 1984, 1994)

Ron "Stix" Ballatore (1941 – April 27, 2012) was an American college and international swimming coach. From 1978 to 1994, Ballatore was the head coach of the men's swimming and diving team at the University of California, Los Angeles (UCLA), where he coached his UCLA Bruins swimmers to an NCAA national championship in 1982.

== Education ==
Graduating Southern Illinois University in 1962, he earned a bachelor of science degree. As a college swimmer, he received All-American honors competing in the backstroke for the Southern Illinois Salukis swimming team. In 1975, he completed a master's degree in educational psychology from Azusa Pacific University.

== Early coaching, and UCLA ==
His first coaching job was at Toledo Swim Club, where he worked from 1965 to 1967, moving to Pasadena City College from 1967 to 1978.

In sixteen years at UCLA, Ballatore's Bruins never won a Pacific-10 Conference team championship, but finished second in the conference ten out of sixteen seasons. Nevertheless, he was chosen as the Pac-10's Coach of the Year four times. Nationally, however, his Bruins teams were perennial top-ten contenders in NCAA competition. Ballatore's swimmers won twenty-six NCAA championships in individual events, plus another two NCAA championships in relay events. His UCLA swimmers also compiled a 98 percent graduation rate.

A combination of Title IX compliance problems and the weak financial condition of the UCLA athletic department in the early 1990s forced UCLA to disband the Bruins men's swimming program after the 1993–94 season. Ballatore became the head coach of the Brown Bears swimming team at Brown University from 1994 to 1995, and the Florida Gators swimming and diving team at the University of Florida from 1996 to 1999. Before UCLA, he coached the Lancers swim team of Pasadena City College from 1967 to 1978.

== Olympic coaching ==
While leading the UCLA Bruins swimming program, Ballatore coached twenty-eight Olympians, including gold medalists Brian Goodell and Tom Jager. Four-time Olympic gold medalist Tom Jager, still holds the record in the 50-meter freestyle.

Ballatore served as a coach for five Olympic swimming teams, including the United States team at the 1984 Summer Olympics and 1988 Summer Olympics, the Peruvian team in 1968, the Ecuadorian team in 1972, and the Israeli team in 1976. He was the head coach of the U.S. national swimming team at the 1975 Pan American Games, where his American men's swimmers won twenty-six medals in individual and relay events.

== Honors ==
He was inducted into the American Swimming Coaches Association Hall of Fame in 2009, and the UCLA Athletics Hall of Fame in 2012.

Ballatore and his first wife, Sandra Lee had two children, a daughter and a son. With his second wife, Ann Claire he had three children two girls and a boy. He died in Gainesville, Florida, from cancer; he was 71 years old.

== See also ==
- American Swimming Coaches Association
- List of Southern Illinois University alumni
- List of University of Florida Olympians
- UCLA Bruins
