= Goodfield, Illinois =

Village in central Illinois, USA

Goodfield
- Village
- Location of Goodfield
- Coordinates: 40°37′38″N 89°16′21″W
- Country: United States
- State: Illinois
- County: Woodford

Area
  - Total: 1.63 sq mi (4.22 km^{2})
  - Land: 1.62 sq mi (4.20 km^{2})
  - Water: 0.0077 sq mi (0.02 km^{2})
- Elevation: 702 ft (214 m)

Population (2020)
  - Total: 936
  - Density: 577.1/sq mi (222.81/km^{2})
- Time zone: UTC-6 (CST)
  - Summer (DST): UTC-5 (CDT)
- ZIP code: 61742
- Area code: 309
- FIPS code: 17-30445
- GNIS feature ID: 2398176
- Website: goodfieldil.gov

Goodfield is a village in Tazewell and Woodford counties in Illinois. The population was 936 at the 2020 census, up from 686 at the 2000 census. Goodfield is part of the Peoria, Illinois, Metropolitan Statistical Area.

== History ==
The site of Goodfield was surveyed for John Guth of Washington, Illinois, on August 29, 1888. The name Goodfield is believed to derive from Guthville (via Goodville), named after John Guth.

=== 2019 Fire ===
The area of the village gained local, national, and global notoriety when a 9-year-old boy allegedly set fire to a trailer that contained his mother and several other relatives, killing five, including at least one or two young children who were relatives. The fire was, after some time, determined to be suspicious by the coroner and fire investigators and area police. The boy, who as a young juvenile cannot be named (there is, after the mother gave an interview, also a court-imposed gag order on all parties), is subsequently being prosecuted on five first degree murder charges and aggravated arson resulting in death. The boy, taken from his mother after the fire, is a ward of the state, and his grandparents are now his legal guardians. His initial appearance was before Judge Charles Feeney, who took careful time to explain the charges and their meaning. Under Illinois law, those under 10 cannot be detained except for brief questioning, and those under 13 cannot be detained in a juvenile facility or juvenile detention center. They must be at least 16 to be transferred to adult court. He will face probation for a minimum of five years but not after age 21, restitution and/or some form of service, and intensive therapy, counseling, and rehabilitation. He is the youngest to be charged in central Illinois since at least 2006, especially for such a serious offense that in adult could bring life without parole in the non-death penalty state.

== Geography ==
According to the 2010 census, Goodfield has a total area of 1.698 square miles (4.40 km^{2}), of which 1.69 square miles (4.38 km^{2}) (or 99.53%) is land and 0.008 square miles (0.02 km^{2}) (or 0.47%) is water.

== Demographics ==
Historical population
Census	Pop.	Note	%±
1960	286		—
1970	329		15.0%
1980	500		52.0%
1990	454		−9.2%
2000	686		51.1%
2010	860		25.4%
2020	936		8.8%
U.S. Decennial Census

As of the census of 2000, there were 686 people, 229 households, and 199 families residing in the village. The population density was 474.2 inhabitants per square mile (183.1/km^{2}). There were 235 housing units at an average density of 162.4 per square mile (62.7/km^{2}). The racial makeup of the village was 99.13% White, 0.15% African American, 0.29% from other races, and 0.44% from two or more races.

There were 229 households, out of which 42.8% had children under the age of 18 living with them, 79.9% were married couples living together, 5.2% had a female householder with no husband present, and 13.1% were non-families. 10.0% of all households were made up of individuals, and 5.2% had someone living alone who was 65 years of age or older. The average household size was 3.00 and the average family size was 3.24.

In the village, the population was spread out, with 32.4% under the age of 18, 7.7% from 18 to 24, 29.3% from 25 to 44, 20.0% from 45 to 64, and 10.6% who were 65 years of age or older. The median age was 33 years. For every 100 females, there were 98.8 males. For every 100 females age 18 and over, there were 93.3 males.

The median income for a household in the village was $60,069, and the median income for a family was $61,736. Males had a median income of $46,042 versus $26,125 for females. The per capita income for the village was $20,099. About 2.1% of families and 3.2% of the population were below the poverty line, including 2.6% of those under age 18 and 2.4% of those age 65 or over.

== Economy ==
CNH (company) has a plant located in Goodfield that manufactures branded (Case IH, New Holland, and DMI) crop production, fertilizer and tillage equipment. Goodfield also has local businesses including EarlyBird Feed and Fertilizer and a diner named Busy Corner.

== Notable people ==
- Styropyro, YouTube personality
