= Chintia Kirana =

American painter (born 1987)

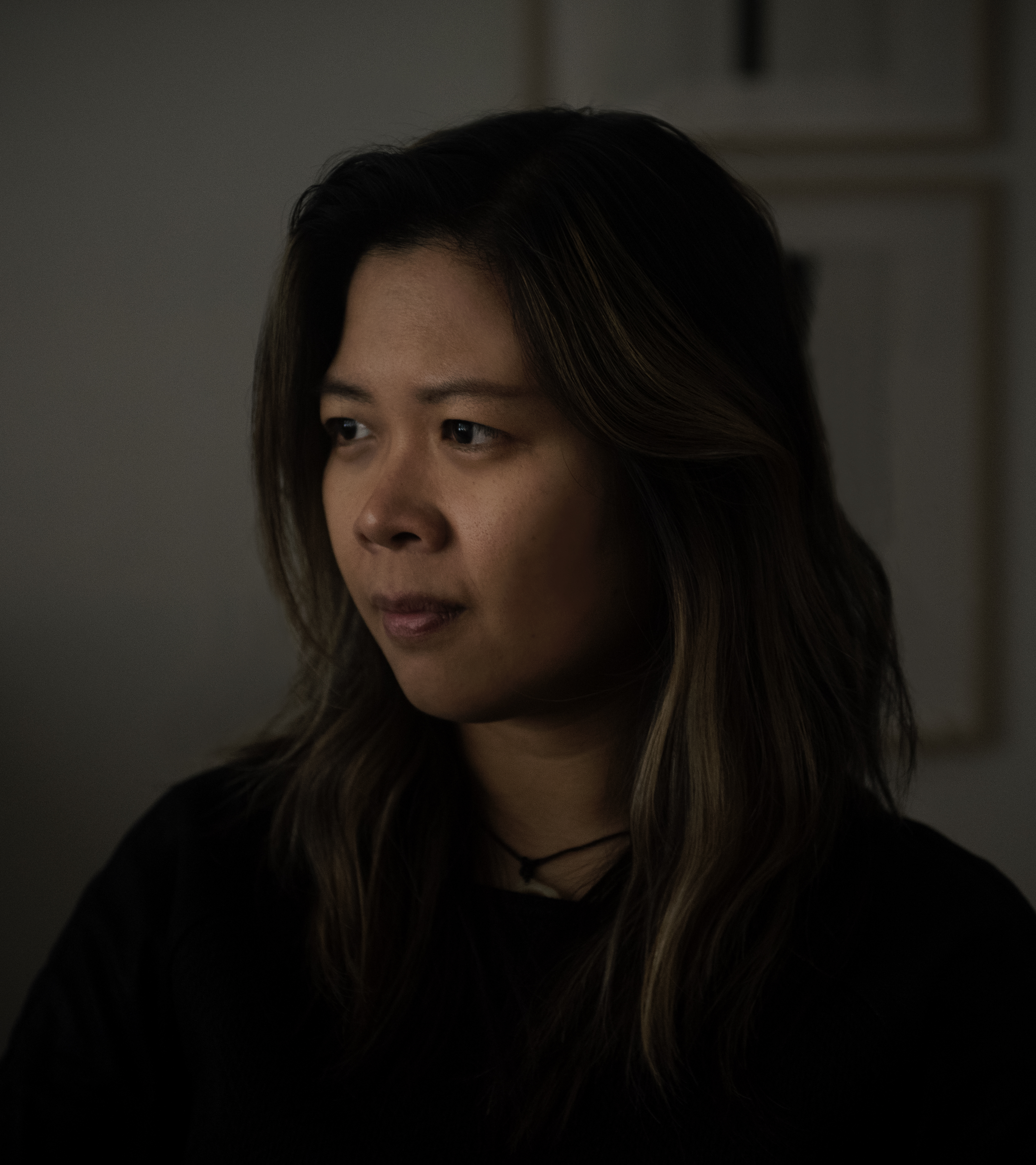
- Chintia Kirana, artist photo
- Born: Chintia Agustina Kirana; 11 August 1987 (age 38); Jakarta, Indonesia
- Education: Southern Illinois University (MFA)
- Years active: 2011-present
- Awards: Verdant Fund/ Andy Warhol Regranting Program Grant (2022), Alabama State Art Council Fellowship (2019), Elizabeth Greenshield Foundation Grant(2011),
- Known for: Painting, drawing, socially engaged projects, installation
- Website: chintiakirana.com

Chintia Kirana is a Chinese Indonesian-born American artist. She is best known for her abstract and minimalistic work exploring identity, the passage of time, and spirituality. Her practice also includes curatorial and community-based projects that emphasize collaboration and public engagement.

== Education ==
Kirana was born in Jakarta, Indonesia. She received a Bachelor of Arts in painting and drawing from Auburn University Montgomery, graduating magna cum laude, and later earned a Master of Fine Arts in painting and drawing from Southern Illinois University Carbondale.

She served as the art director for the 2024 Indonesian film The Architecture of Love.

== Career ==
Kirana began her career in academia, teaching as an instructor of record at Southern Illinois University Carbondale between 2013 and 2015. From 2016 to 2019, she was a visiting lecturer at Auburn University Montgomery, where she taught drawing, painting, and foundational art courses. She later worked as a visual arts teacher at Booker T. Washington Magnet High School from 2019 to 2022, teaching introductory through Advanced Placement-level courses.

Kirana has played a role in cultural organizing. She is the founder of Expose Art, an art magazine, and Expose Art House, an artist-run residency program. She also co-founded the Montgomery Arts Project (MAP), which brought French artist JR’s Inside Out Project to Dexter Avenue in Montgomery in 2019. She later served as creative director for the Alabama leg of the international Walk With Amal tour in 2023.

Her curatorial projects include Path of Entry at the Wiregrass Museum of Art (2021) and Road Less Traveled at the Montgomery Museum of Fine Arts (2022). She has served as a juror for exhibitions, participated in grant review panels, and spoken at conferences such as the Southeastern Museum Conference and the Georgia Art Museum Association’s “New Voices” program. She is currently a member of the board of trustees at the Montgomery Museum of Fine Arts.

== Exhibitions ==
- Eling/Awakening, Taman Budaya Jogjakarta, Jogjakarta, Indonesia (2025)
- In Time (solo), Johnson Center of the Arts, Troy, Alabama (2024)
- Frequent Goodbyes, H-Space, Washington, D.C. (2023)
- Echoes of Time, WhiteSpace Gallery, Atlanta, Georgia (2023)
- Alabama Triennial Invitational Exhibit, Abroms-Engel Institute for the Visual Arts (2022)
- Gravitational Pull (solo), Lowe Mill Arts, Huntsville, Alabama (2022)
- Between Heaven and Earth (solo), Wiregrass Museum of Art, Dothan, Alabama (2021)
- This is Me, curated by Dashboard, Kress on Dexter, Montgomery, Alabama (2021)
- Uncommon Territory, Montgomery Museum of Fine Arts (2017)
- Debtfair, Occupy Museums project, Whitney Biennial, Whitney Museum of American Art, New York (2017)

== Awards ==
- Elizabeth Greenshield Foundation Grant (2016)
- Vermont Studio Center Artist Merit Grant (2019)
- Alabama State Council on the Arts Artist Fellowship (2019–2020)
- Verdant Fund/Warhol Foundation Regranting Program (2022)
- Nexus Grant (2023)
- ArtAffect Camel Grant (2024)
- Alabama Arts and Humanities Grant (2024)

== Media references and appearances ==
Kirana had a television guesting on a show called Expressions. She is also featured in the Alabama Public Television Show called Monograph winter 2021 Edition.
