= Evan Goyke =

21st century American politician

City Attorney of Milwaukee
- Incumbent
- Assumed office April 16, 2024
- Preceded by: Tearman Spencer

Member of the Wisconsin State Assembly from the 18th district
- In office January 7, 2013 – January 6, 2025
- Preceded by: Tamara Grigsby
- Succeeded by: Margaret Arney

Personal details
- Born: November 24, 1982 (age 43) Neenah, Wisconsin, U.S.
- Party: Democratic
- Parent: Gary Goyke (father)
- Education: St. John's University (BA); Marquette University (JD)
- Profession: Lawyer, politician
- Website: Official website

Evan Goyke (born November 24, 1982) is an American lawyer, academic, and Democratic politician from Milwaukee, Wisconsin. He is the city attorney of Milwaukee, since April 2024, and previously represented western Milwaukee for six terms in the Wisconsin State Assembly, from 2013 to 2025.

His father, Gary Goyke, was a member of the Wisconsin Senate in the 1970s and 1980s.

== Early life and education ==
Goyke was born in Neenah, Wisconsin, the son of former state senator Gary Goyke. He earned a Bachelor of Arts in political science from St. John's University and a Juris Doctor from the Marquette University Law School.

== Career ==
After graduating from law school, Goyke worked as an attorney in the Milwaukee office of the State Public Defender. He also became an Adjunct Assistant Professor at Marquette University Law School, where he has worked on the Milwaukee Street Law Project, in which Marquette second- and third-year law students participate in a weekly seminar; go on to teach an "introduction to law" course at local high schools; and finally conduct a citywide mock trial competition.

When incumbent Grigsby was forced to decline re-nomination in the wake of her cancer problems, this heavily-Democratic district saw an eight-way primary election. Goyke faced seven opponents in the crowded Democratic primary field. His opponents included Jarett Fields, an employee of the University of Wisconsin–Milwaukee and brother of Democratic incumbent Jason Fields of the neighboring 11th District. With 1,637 votes out of 4,399 (more than twice that of Fields, his nearest competitor), he achieved a plurality of 37.2%. In the November general election, he faced only Libertarian Melba Morris-Page, winning with 16,245 to Morris-Page's 2,133. Goyke went on to win re-election five times in this Assembly district.

His tenure in the legislature was known for his advocacy on criminal justice reform and style of seeking bi-partisan engagement when possible, including traveling to rural and suburban districts to building stronger understanding of Milwaukee’s value to the broader state. He also served on the state’s powerful Joint Finance Committee.

In the 2024 Spring election, Goyke was elected city attorney of Milwaukee with 63% of the vote. He defeated incumbent Tearman Spencer, whose one term as city attorney was plagued by scandal and controversy. Goyke took office April 16; he announced that he would not run for re-election to the State Assembly but would serve out the remainder of the 2023–2024 term. He was succeeded by fellow Democrat Margaret Arney.

== Electoral history ==
=== Wisconsin Assembly (2012–2022) ===
Year	Election	Date	Elected				Defeated				Total	Plurality
2012	Primary	Aug. 14	Evan Goyke	Democratic	1,637	37.11%	Jarett Fields	Dem.	808	18.32%	4,411	829
2012	Primary	Aug. 14	Evan Goyke	Democratic	1,637	37.11%	Lashawndra Vernon	Dem.	639	14.49%	4,411	829
2012	Primary	Aug. 14	Evan Goyke	Democratic	1,637	37.11%	James Dieter	Dem.	355	8.05%	4,411	829
2012	Primary	Aug. 14	Evan Goyke	Democratic	1,637	37.11%	Andrew Parker	Dem.	335	7.59%	4,411	829
2012	Primary	Aug. 14	Evan Goyke	Democratic	1,637	37.11%	Ty Jackson	Dem.	317	7.19%	4,411	829
2012	Primary	Aug. 14	Evan Goyke	Democratic	1,637	37.11%	Michael L. Glabere	Dem.	169	3.83%	4,411	829
2012	Primary	Aug. 14	Evan Goyke	Democratic	1,637	37.11%	Lisa Erin Brown	Dem.	139	3.15%	4,411	829
2012	General	Nov. 6	Evan Goyke	Democratic	16,276	87.93%	Melba Morris-Page	Ind.	2,140	11.56%	18,510	14,136
2014	General	Nov. 4	Evan Goyke (inc)	Democratic	16,522	98.50%	--unopposed--				16,773	16,271
2016	General	Nov. 8	Evan Goyke (inc)	Democratic	18,006	98.87%	--unopposed--				18,212	17,800
2018	General	Nov. 6	Evan Goyke (inc)	Democratic	17,426	98.99%	--unopposed--				17,603	17,249
2020	General	Nov. 3	Evan Goyke (inc)	Democratic	18,775	99.00%	--unopposed--				18,964	18,586
2022	General	Nov. 8	Evan Goyke (inc)	Democratic	17,306	98.45%	--unopposed--				17,863	17,034

=== Milwaukee City Attorney (2024) ===
Year	Election	Date	Elected				Defeated				Total	Plurality
2024	General	Apr. 2	Evan Goyke	Nonpartisan	46,413	63.32%	Tearman Spencer (inc)	Nonpartisan	26,518	36.18%	73,296	19,895

Wisconsin State Assembly
Preceded by Tamara Grigsby	Member of the Wisconsin State Assembly from the 18th district January 7, 2013 – January 6, 2025	Succeeded by Margaret Arney
Legal offices
Preceded by Tearman Spencer	City Attorney of Milwaukee; April 16, 2024 – present	Incumbent
