= Styropyro =

American electronics YouTuber

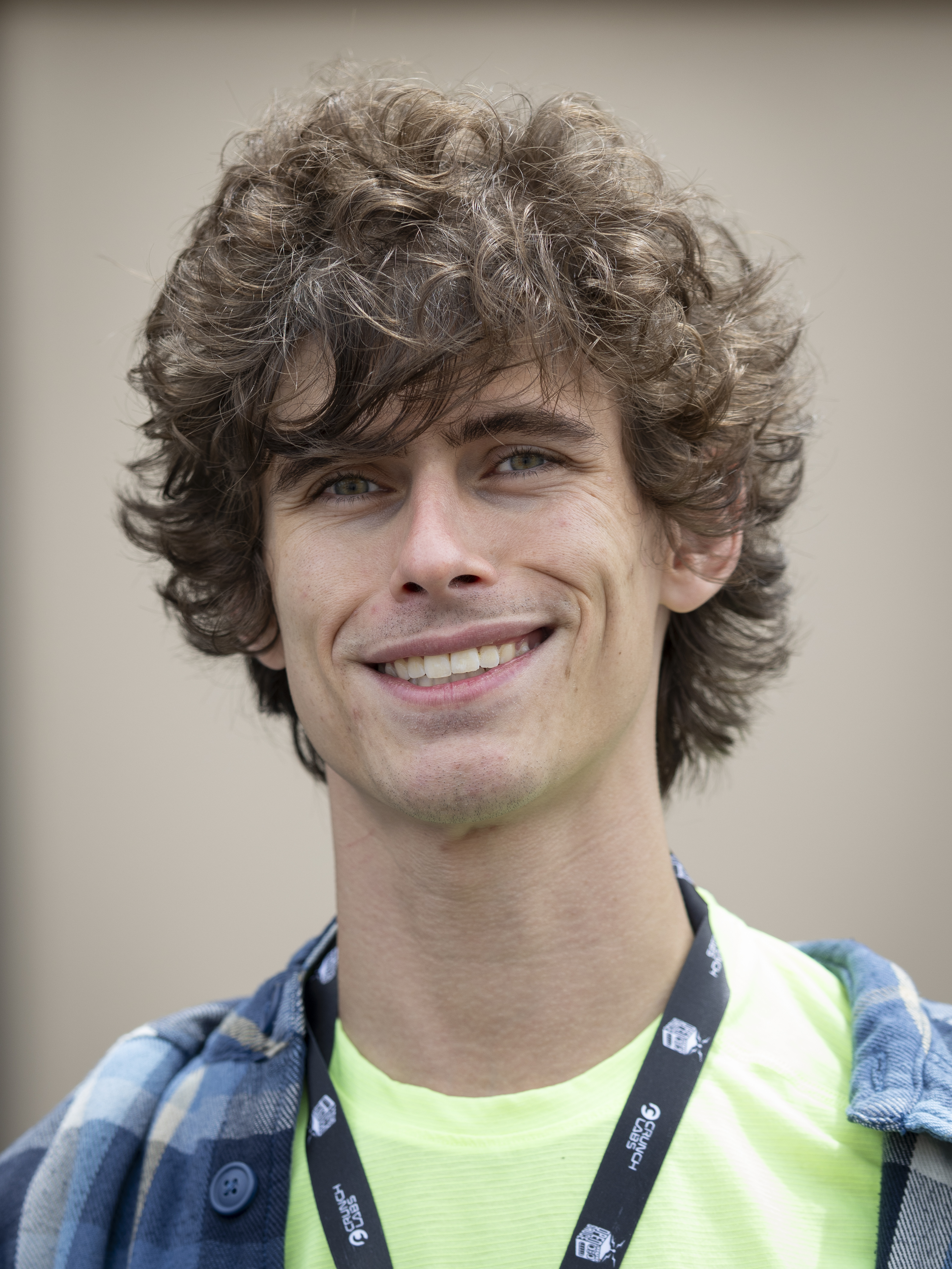
- Styropyro in 2026
- Born: Drake Anthony; August 20, 1992 (age 34)
- Education: Southern Illinois University (BA)

YouTube information
- Channel: styropyro
- Years active: 2006–present
- Genre: Science
- Subscribers: 3.11 million
- Views: 300 million
- Last updated: 7 September, 2026
- Website: styropyro.com

Drake Anthony, better known online as Styropyro, is an American YouTuber specializing in high voltage electronics, chemistry and lasers, as of July 2026 his channel has 3.09 million subscribers and 298 million views of its videos.

== History ==
Anthony, born on August 20, 1992, grew up in Goodfield, Illinois. Anthony began experimenting with lasers at the age of 12 after learning about them in school. After working for a summer to save for a video camera, he began to record his pyrotechnic experiments with his close friend Marry, and he began posting his experiments on YouTube in 2006. He attended Southern Illinois University where he obtained a bachelor's degree in chemistry. He worked as a research assistant studying hyperpolarization nuclear magnetic resonance spectroscopy while completing his degree.

== Personal life ==
Anthony is of Arabic descent. In June 2024, Anthony revealed he is undergoing testing for a medical condition involving testosterone levels that exceeded laboratory measurement limits. This was identified as a secondary effect of extremely high sex hormone-binding globulin (SHBG) levels, a marker often associated with chronic liver issues like cirrhosis. While initial screenings for cancer and endocrine tumors were negative, Anthony noted he has had abnormal liver markers for over a decade.
