= Lena Taylor =

American politician (born 1966)

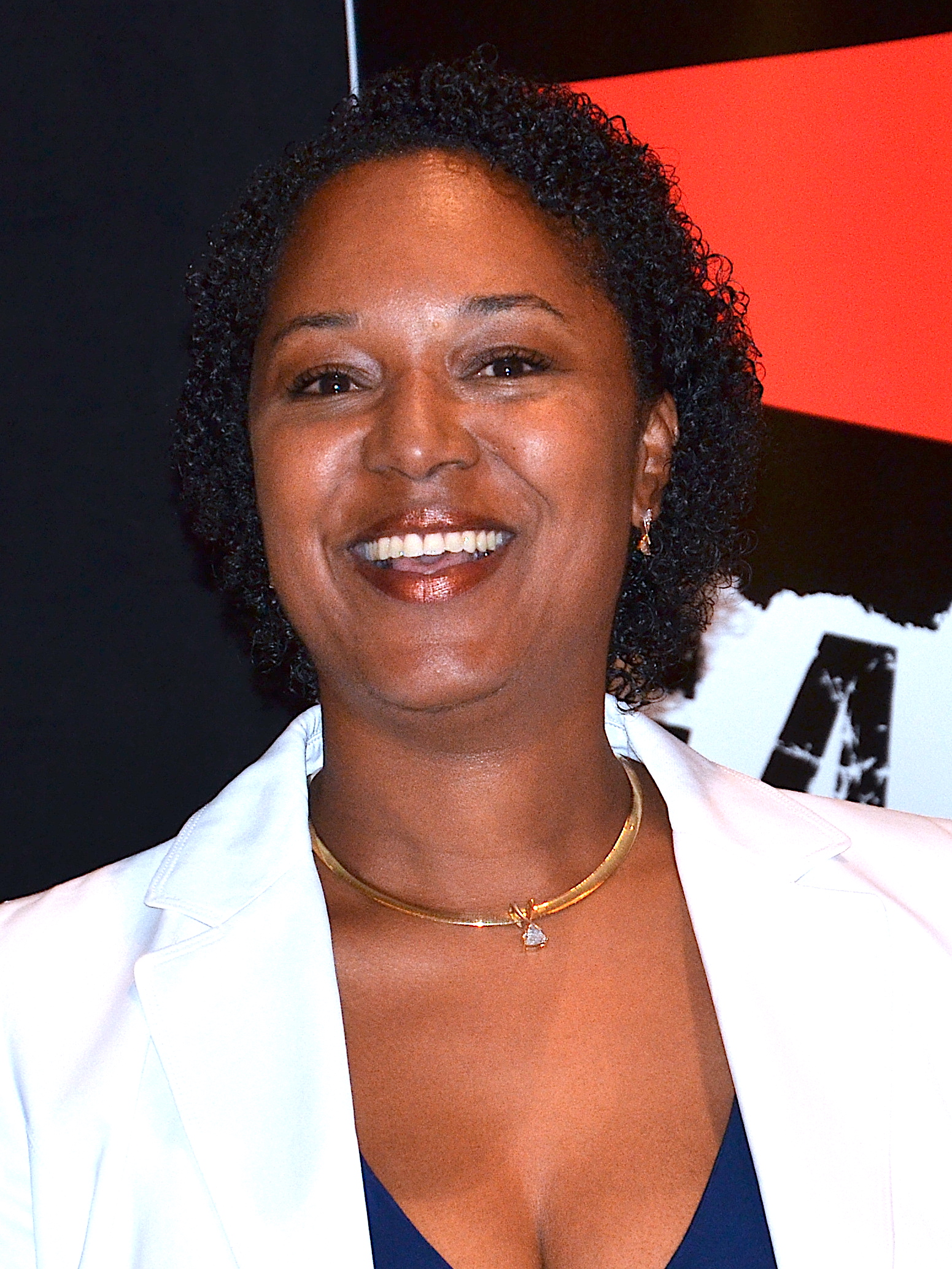
- Taylor in 2013

Wisconsin Circuit Judge for the Milwaukee Circuit, Branch 41
- Incumbent
- Assumed office January 30, 2024
- Appointed by: Tony Evers
- Preceded by: Audrey Skwierawski

Member of the Wisconsin Senate from the 4th district
- In office January 3, 2005 – January 26, 2024
- Preceded by: Gwen Moore
- Succeeded by: Dora Drake

Member of the Wisconsin State Assembly from the 18th district
- In office April 30, 2003 – January 3, 2005
- Preceded by: Antonio R. Riley
- Succeeded by: Tamara Grigsby

Personal details
- Born: July 25, 1966 (age 60) Milwaukee, Wisconsin, U.S.
- Party: Democratic
- Education: University of Wisconsin–Milwaukee (BA); Southern Illinois University (JD)
- Profession: Lawyer

Lena C. Taylor (born July 25, 1966) is an American lawyer, judge, and former politician serving as a Wisconsin circuit court judge in Milwaukee County, since January 2024. She previously served 19 years as a Democratic member of the Wisconsin Senate, representing the 4th Senate district from 2005 to 2024, and was a member of the Wisconsin State Assembly for one term before that.

Taylor previously ran unsuccessfully for Milwaukee County executive in 2008 and mayor of Milwaukee in 2020 and 2022.

== Early life and education ==
Lena Taylor was born and raised in Milwaukee, Wisconsin. She graduated from Milwaukee's Rufus King High School in 1984 and went on to attend the University of Wisconsin–Milwaukee, where she earned her bachelor's degree in English in 1990. As an undergraduate, she became a member of the Alpha Kappa Alpha sorority. She continued her education after graduation, earning her J.D. from Southern Illinois University School of Law in 1993.

== Early legal career ==
After graduating from law school, Taylor went to work as a public defender for more than two years, representing indigent citizens in need of legal services. In 1996, she opened Taylor and Associates Law Office, a general practice firm on the north side of Milwaukee.

== Wisconsin legislature ==
=== State Assembly (2003-2005) ===
Taylor made her first run for public office in the Spring of 2003, in a special election for Wisconsin State Assembly necessitated by the resignation of state representative Antonio R. Riley. In the Democratic primary, she faced Ted Kraig, then co-chair of the health care task force for Citizen Action. Taylor prevailed in the primary with 68% of the vote, and faced no other opposition for the special general election in the heavily Democratic district.

=== State Senate (2005-2024) ===
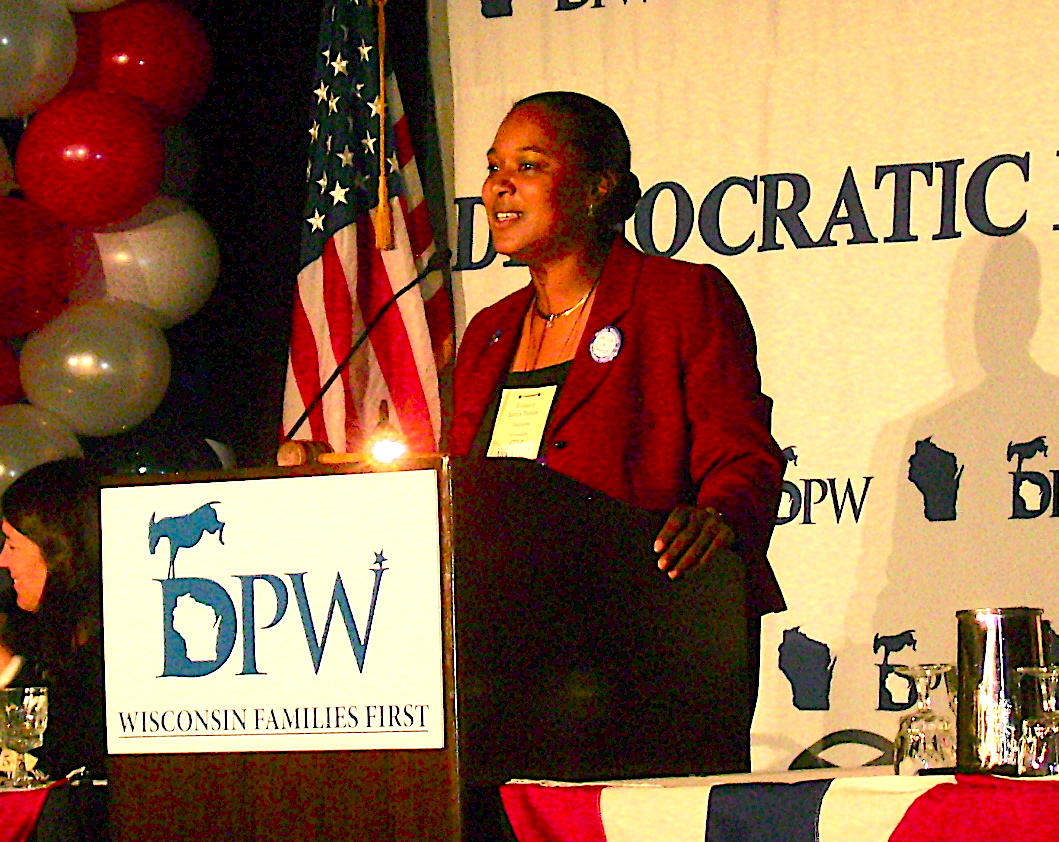
Taylor speaking at the 2007 Wisconsin Democratic Party State Convention

About a year after Taylor joined the Assembly, her district's state senator, Gwen Moore, announced a run for United States House of Representatives, creating an open seat in the 4th state Senate district for the fall 2004 election. Taylor declared for the state senate, and faced a competitive primary against six-term incumbent state representative Johnnie E. Morris-Tatum from the neighboring 11th Assembly district. She prevailed with 47% of the vote; Morris-Tatum received 36%, and a third candidate received 17%. She faced no opponent in the general election. When Democrats won the Senate majority in 2006, Taylor was named chair of the Senate committee on judiciary and corrections, and was also appointed to a seat on the powerful budget-writing Joint Finance Committee.

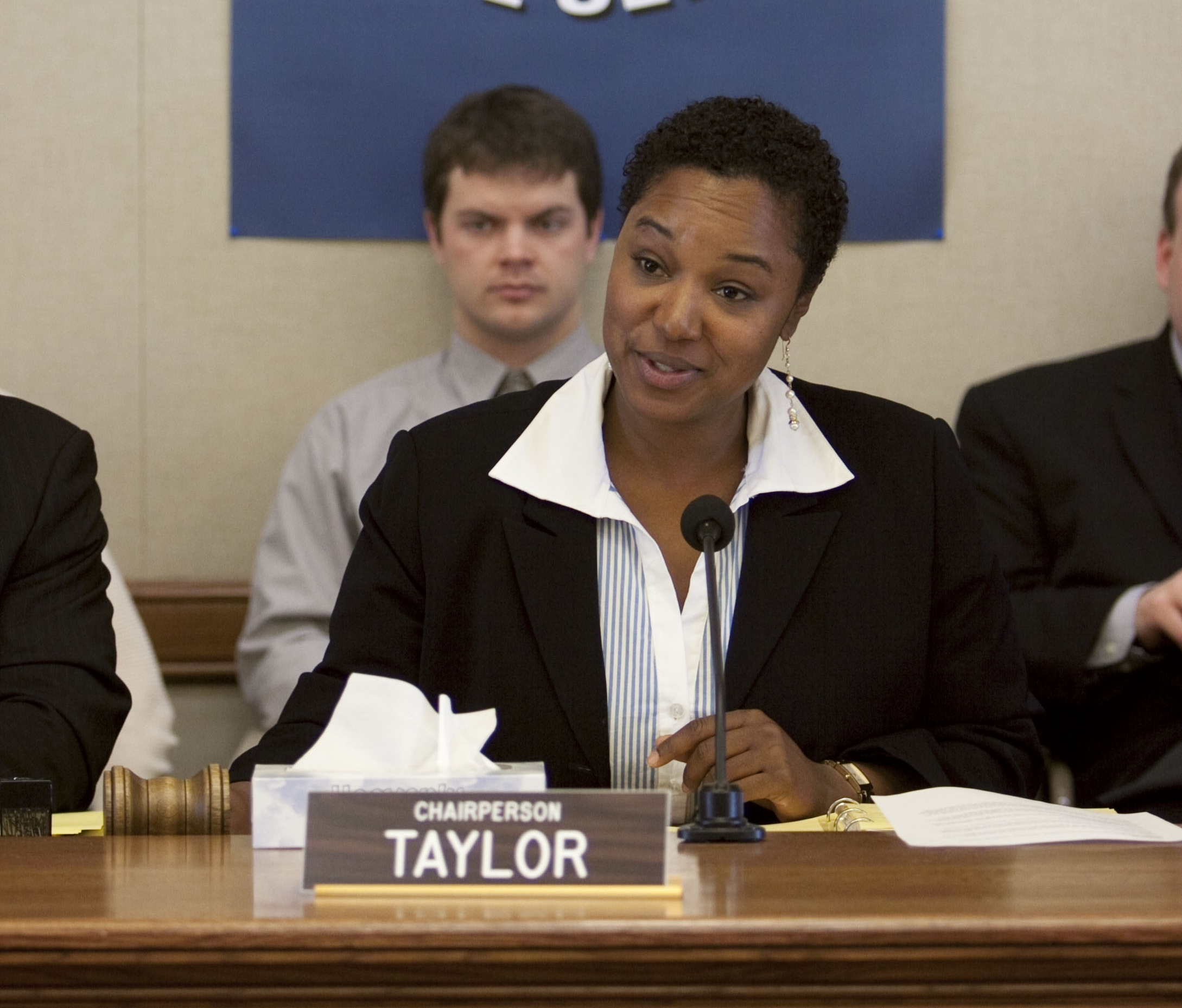
Taylor chairing a committee meeting in 2009

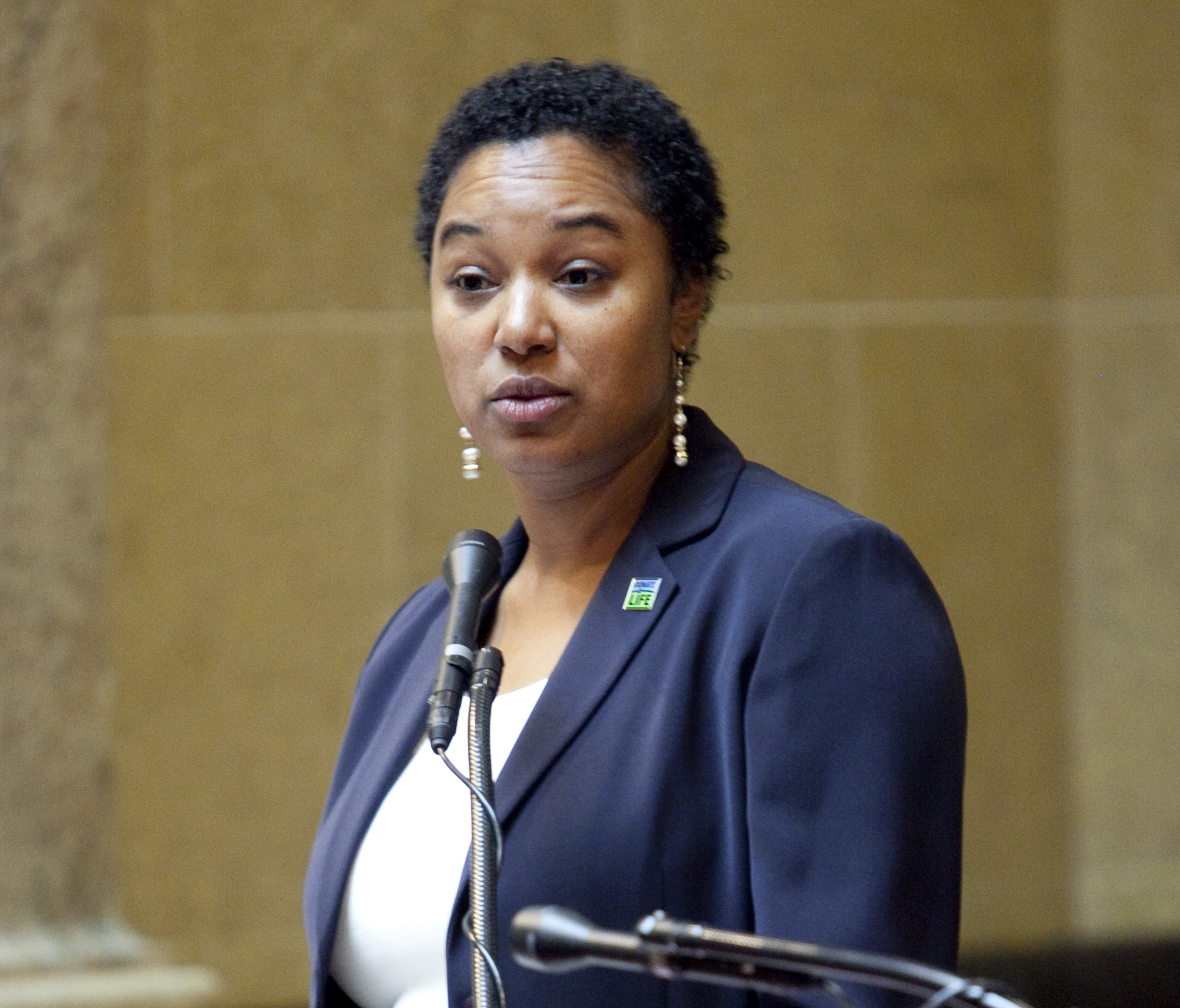
Taylor in 2009

Taylor was re-elected without opposition in 2008, and retained her committee positions as Democrats continued in the majority. As chair of the judiciary and corrections committee, she expanded the committee's work on criminal justice reforms and implemented the "State of Justice" tour, bringing committee hearings to several different locations around the state of Wisconsin.

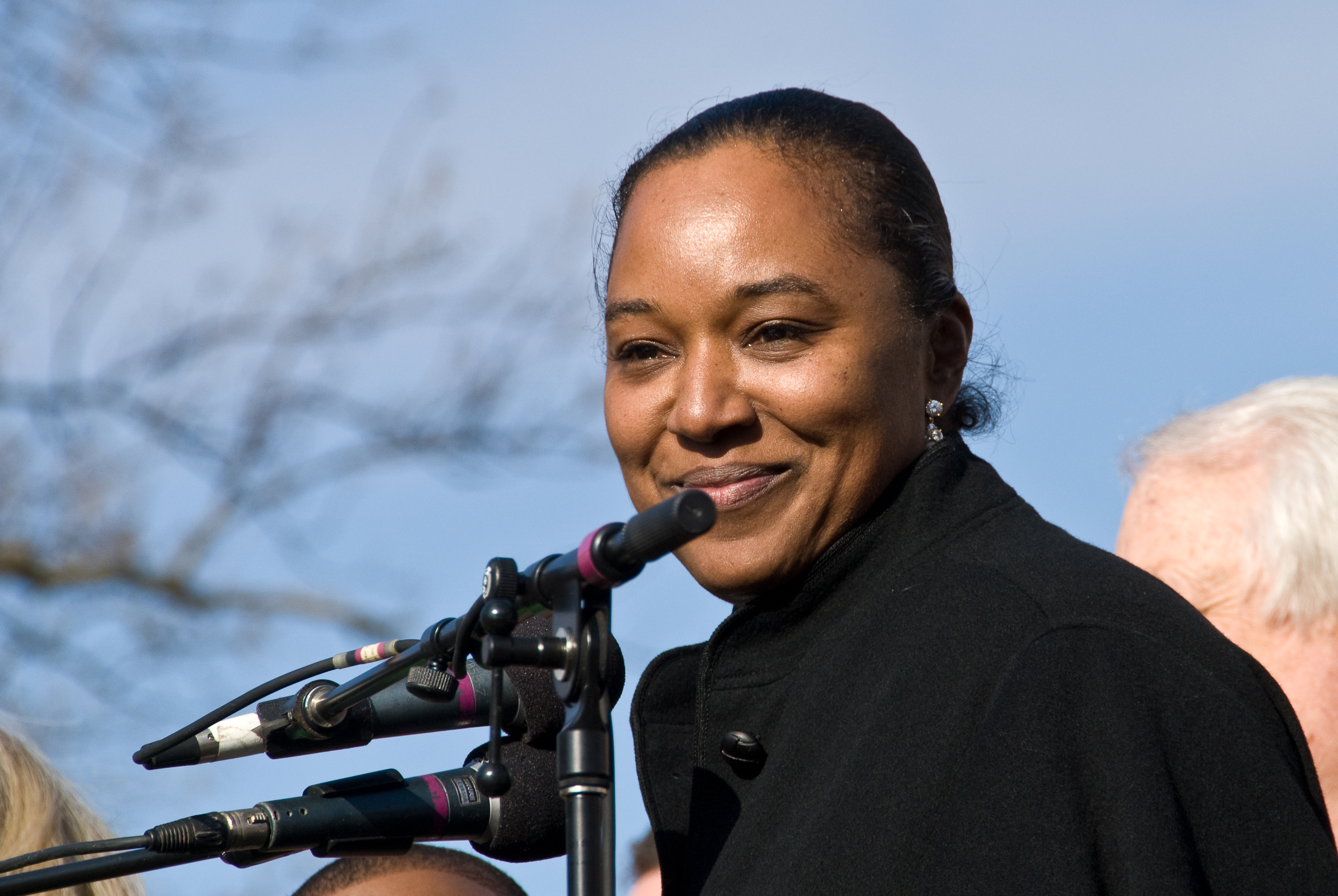
Taylor speaking at the May 12, 2011, protest at the Wisconsin State Capitol

After the 2010 election, Republicans gained full control of state government, winning both chambers of the Legislature and the governor's office. Shortly into the start of the 2011 legislative term, Walker proposed his controversial "Budget Repair Bill", which would eliminate collective bargaining rights for Wisconsin's public-sector unions. This resulted in mass protests at the Wisconsin State Capitol, which continued for months. Responding to public pressure and unable to slow down the legislative consideration of the bill, Taylor fled the state with 13 other Democratic state senators in order to deny a quorum. The situation received national attention, and Taylor was a frequent guest on progressive political talk shows, appearing several times on The Ed Show. During the course of debate, Taylor made statements comparing Walker's proposed legislation to Adolf Hitler's plan to eliminate unions. On her Twitter account she wrote "LIKE HITLER in 1933, WALKER is busting unions."

In the 2011 Wisconsin Senate recall elections, three Republican state senators were removed from office, which gave the Democrats a brief return to being the majority party in the state senate. During this time, Taylor served as co-chair of the Joint Finance Committee.

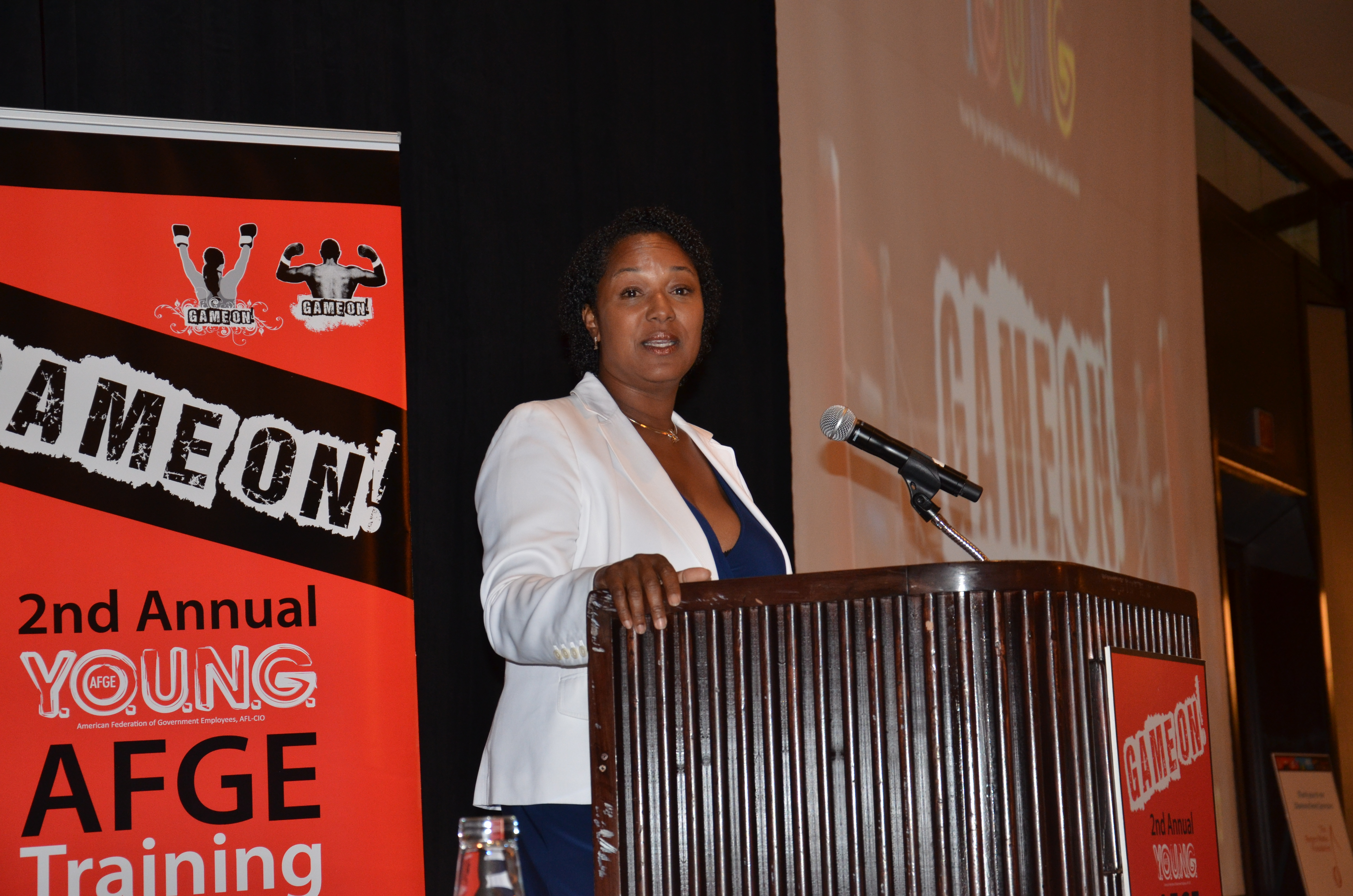
Taylor in 2013

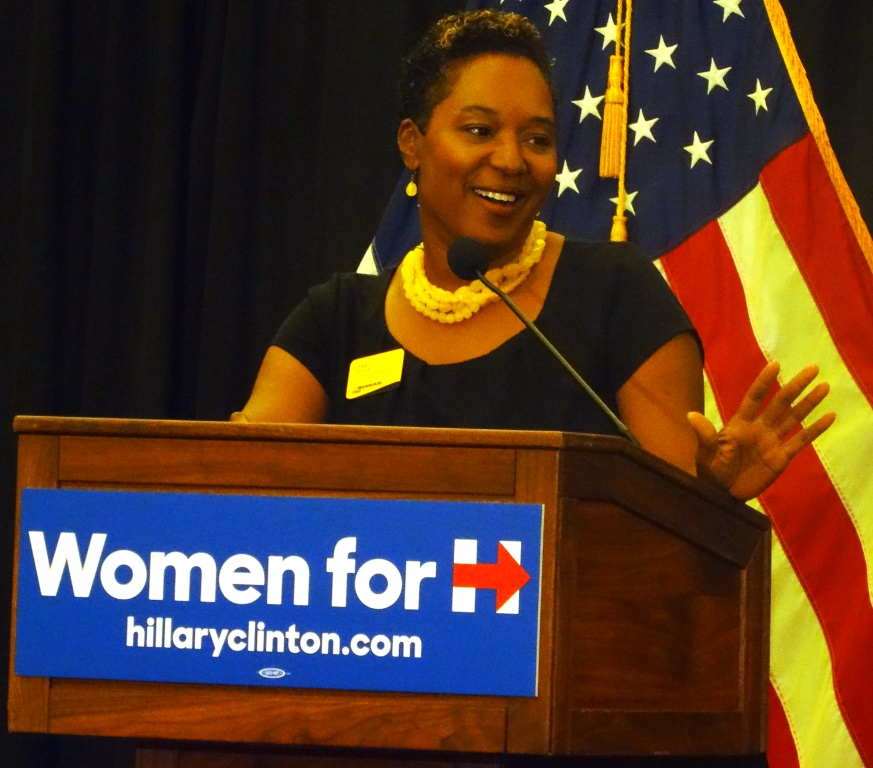
Taylor speaking at a September 2015 event for Hillary Clinton's 2016 presidential campaign

Prior to losing their senate majority in the recall elections, Republicans passed redistricting legislation. The 2012 Wisconsin elections were the first to use the new map. Under the new map, Taylor's district remained overwhelmingly Democratic. She faced only an independent opponent in 2012, winning her third term with 86% of the vote.

In her 2016 re-election campaign, Taylor faced a primary challenge from state representative Mandela Barnes, but she managed to prevail with 60% of the vote.

In April 2018, Taylor generated controversy and received a citation for disorderly conduct after an incident in which she used the term "house nigga" (a combination of "house slave" and "nigga") during a dispute with a bank teller who had refused to cash a check (citing insufficient funds). Both Taylor and the teller involved are African Americans.

In 2020, Taylor was re-elected to a fifth term.

== Other political campaigns ==
=== 2008 county executive campaign ===
Taylor ran for Milwaukee County executive, challenging Republican incumbent Scott Walker in the Spring 2008 election. Walker was already widely perceived as a likely candidate for governor in 2010, and Wisconsin Democrats saw the campaign as a chance to derail him, while Republican donors—both in the state and around the country—funneled money into his campaign. Taylor was badly outspent in the election, with Walker raising more than $500,000 for the campaign. Walker prevailed, taking 58% of the vote, and he went on to win the 2010 gubernatorial election two years later.

=== 2020 mayoral campaign ===
In the fall of 2019, Taylor launched a campaign for mayor of Milwaukee, challenging four-term incumbent Democratic mayor Tom Barrett in the 2020 Milwaukee mayoral election. She survived the February non-partisan primary, which narrowed the field to the top two vote-getters, but was defeated by Barrett in the general election, receiving 36% of the vote.

=== 2022 lieutenant governor and mayoral candidacies ===
After incumbent Democratic Lieutenant Governor of Wisconsin Mandela Barnes announced he would not run for re-election, Taylor briefly entered the race to succeed him, announcing her candidacy in October 2021. She ended her campaign just two months later, on December 25, 2021, choosing instead to focus on the upcoming Milwaukee mayoral election.

In 2020, incumbent mayor Tom Barrett received an ambassadorial appointment, necessitating a special election in 2022. Taylor ran again, but fell to third place in the non-partisan primary, behind acting mayor Cavalier Johnson and long-time city council member Bob Donovan.

=== 2023 municipal judge candidacy ===
In the 2023 Spring election, Taylor sought election to a municipal judge seat in Milwaukee. She was defeated in the April 4 general election by Molly Gena, the managing attorney of a pro bono legal services provider.

== Judgeship (2024–present) ==
On January 26, 2024, Governor Tony Evers appointed Taylor to fill the Wisconsin circuit court judgeship in Milwaukee County left vacant by the resignation of judge Audrey Skwierawski. Taylor resigned from the state senate later that day, and was sworn in as judge on January 30.

== Electoral history ==
=== Wisconsin Assembly (2003) ===
Wisconsin Assembly, 18th District Special Election, 2003
Party	Candidate	Votes	%	±%
Special Democratic Primary, April 1, 2003
Democratic	Lena C. Taylor	2,640	67.88%	
Democratic	Ted Kraig	1,249	32.12%	
Plurality		1,391	35.77%	
Total votes		3,889	100.0%	
Special General Election, April 29, 2003
Democratic	Lena C. Taylor	475	95.96%	
Write-in		20	4.04%	
Plurality		455	91.92%	
Total votes		495	100.0%	

=== Wisconsin Senate (2004–2020) ===
Year	Election	Date	Elected				Defeated				Total	Plurality
2004	Primary	Sep. 14	Lena C. Taylor	Democratic	10,042	46.80%	Johnnie Morris-Tatum	Dem.	7,735	36.05%	21,456	2,307
2004	Primary	Sep. 14	Lena C. Taylor	Democratic	10,042	46.80%	James White	Dem.	3,633	16.93%	21,456	2,307
2004	General	Nov. 2	Lena C. Taylor	Democratic	62,689	99.16%	--unopposed--				63,223	62,155
2008	General	Nov. 4	Lena C. Taylor (inc)	Democratic	66,751	98.82%	--unopposed--				67,551	65,951
2012	General	Nov. 6	Lena C. Taylor (inc)	Democratic	67,064	86.62%	David D. King	Ind.	10,154	13.11%	77,426	56,910
2016	Primary	Aug. 9	Lena C. Taylor (inc)	Democratic	11,454	60.56%	Mandela Barnes	Dem.	7,433	39.30%	18,913	4,021
2016	General	Nov. 8	Lena C. Taylor (inc)	Democratic	62,099	98.33%	--unopposed--				63,153	61,045
2020	General	Nov. 3	Lena C. Taylor (inc)	Democratic	62,405	98.34%	--unopposed--				63,458	61,352

=== Milwaukee County executive (2008) ===
Milwaukee County Executive Election, 2008
Party	Candidate	Votes	%	±%
General Election, April 1, 2008
Republican	Scott Walker (incumbent)	98,039	58.66%	+1.38pp
Democratic	Lena C. Taylor	68,785	41.16%	−1.35pp
Write-in		294	0.18%	
Plurality		29,254	17.50%	+2.73pp
Total votes		167,118	100.0%	-29.65%

=== Milwaukee mayor (2020, 2022) ===
Milwaukee Mayoral Election, 2020
Party	Candidate	Votes	%	±%
Nonpartisan Primary, February 18, 2020
Nonpartisan	Tom Barrett (incumbent)	33,151	50.01%	
Nonpartisan	Lena C. Taylor	20,347	30.69%	
Nonpartisan	Tony Zielinski	10,385	15.67%	
Nonpartisan	Paul Rasky	1,902	2.87%	
Write-in		509	0.77%	
Total votes		66,294	100.0%	
General Election, April 7, 2020
Nonpartisan	Tom Barrett (incumbent)	57,492	62.55%	
Nonpartisan	Lena C. Taylor	33,572	36.52%	
Write-in		852	0.93%	
Plurality		23,920	26.02%	
Total votes		91,916	100.0%	
Nonpartisan hold				

Milwaukee Mayoral Special Election, 2022
Party	Candidate	Votes	%	±%
Special Nonpartisan Primary, February 15, 2022
Nonpartisan	Cavalier Johnson (incumbent)	25,779	41.79%	
Nonpartisan	Bob Donovan	13,742	22.28%	
Nonpartisan	Lena C. Taylor	7,877	12.77%	−17.92pp
Nonpartisan	Marina Dimitrijevic	7,521	2.87%	
Nonpartisan	Earnell Lucas	5,886	9.54%	
Nonpartisan	Michael Sampson	514	0.83%	
Nonpartisan	Ieshuh Griffin	315	0.51%	
Write-in		56	0.09%	
Total votes		61,690	100.0%	-6.94%

=== Wisconsin circuit court (2025) ===
Year	Election	Date	Elected				Defeated	Total	Plurality
2025	General	Apr. 1	Lena C. Taylor (inc)	Nonpartisan	195,351	97.67%	--unopposed--	200,015	

Wisconsin State Assembly
Preceded by Antonio R. Riley	Member of the Wisconsin State Assembly from the 18th district 2003–2005	Succeeded by Tamara Grigsby
Wisconsin Senate
Preceded by Gwen Moore	Member of the Wisconsin Senate from the 4th district 2005–2024	Succeeded by Dora Drake
Legal offices
Preceded by Audrey Skwierawski	Wisconsin Circuit Judge for the Milwaukee Circuit, Branch 41; January 30, 2024 – present	Incumbent
