= Wisconsin's 18th Assembly district =

American legislative district in Milwaukee County, Wisconsin

Wisconsin's 18th State Assembly district
- 2024 map defined in 2023 Wisc. Act 94; 2022 map defined in Johnson v. Wisconsin Elections Commission; 2011 map was defined in 2011 Wisc. Act 43
Assemblymember
Margaret Arney; D–Milwaukee
since January 6, 2025 (1 years)
- Demographics: 36.07% White; 52.57% Black; 6.32% Hispanic; 4.41% Asian; 1.85% Native American; 0.14% Hawaiian/Pacific Islander
- Population (2020) • Voting age: 59,346; 43,972
- Website: Official website
- Notes: Milwaukee's west side

The 18th Assembly district of Wisconsin is one of 99 districts in the Wisconsin State Assembly. Located in southeast Wisconsin, the district is contained within central Milwaukee County, including parts of near-west Milwaukee and southeast Wauwatosa. It contains the Milwaukee neighborhoods Washington Heights and Sherman Park and includes landmarks such as the Miller Brewing Company and Washington Park. The district is represented by Democrat Margaret Arney, since January 2025.

The 18th Assembly district is located within Wisconsin's 6th Senate district, along with the 16th and 17th Assembly districts.

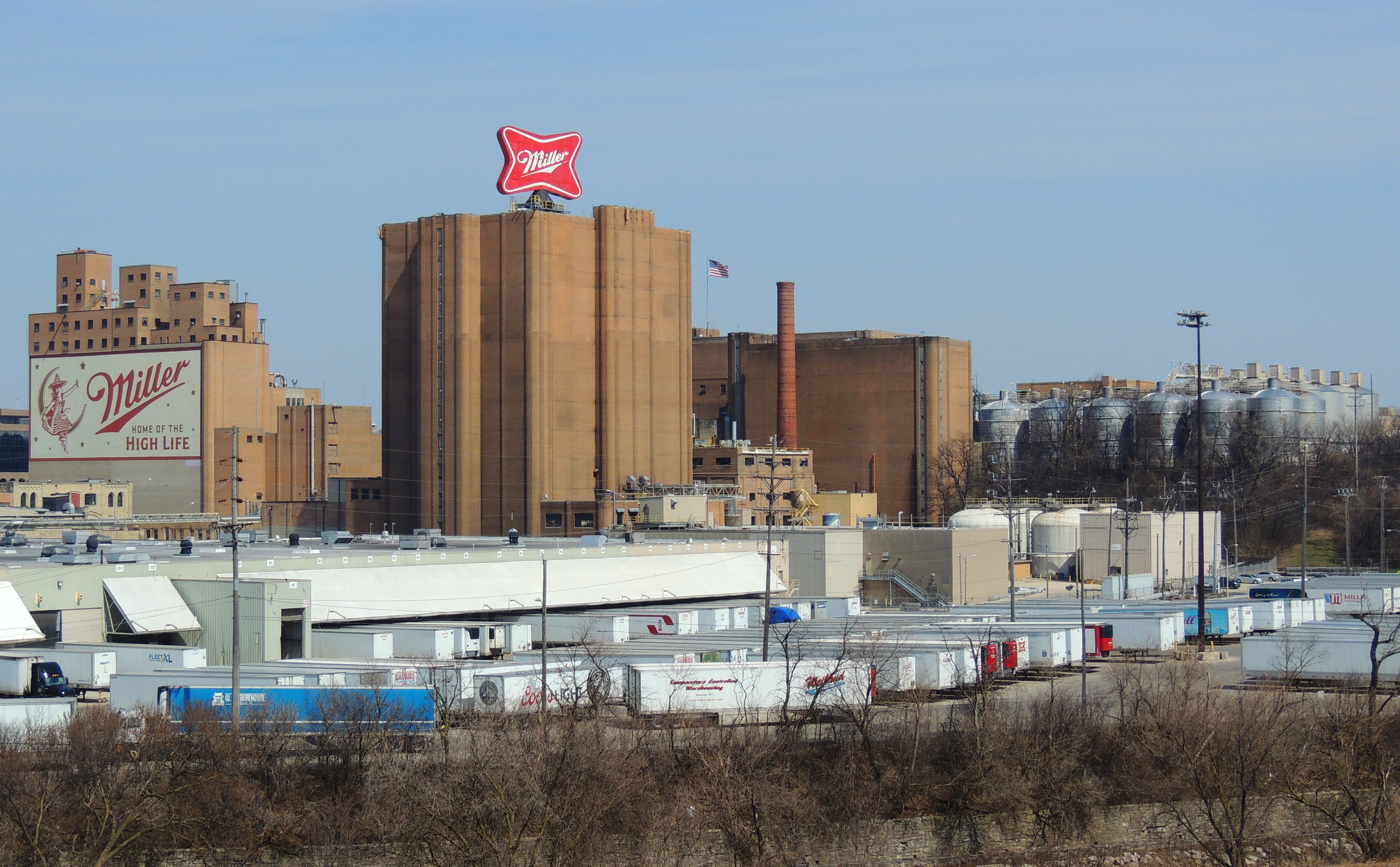
Miller Brewing Company

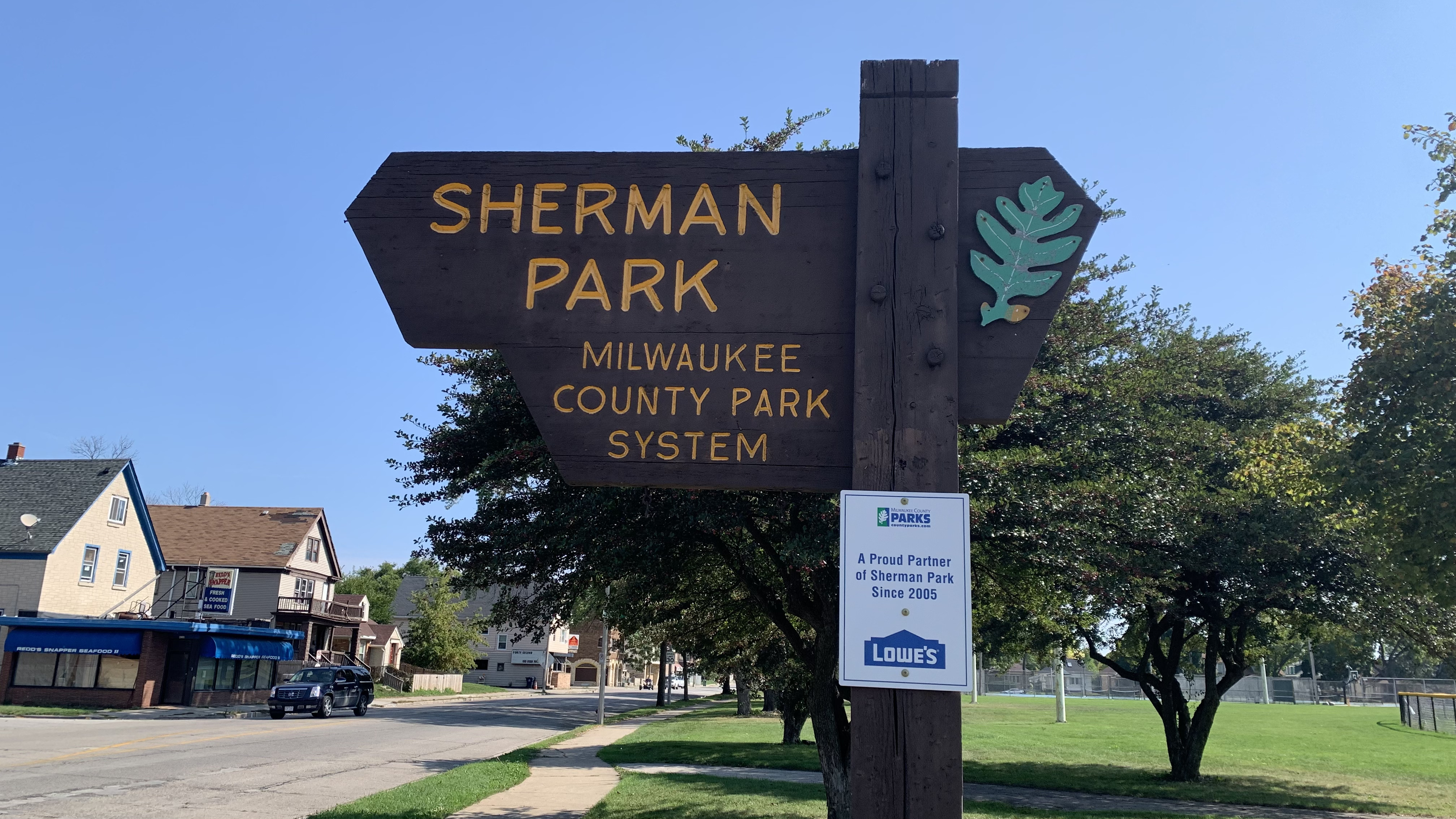
Sherman Park

== History ==
The district was created in the 1972 redistricting act (1971 Wisc. Act 304) which first established the numbered district system, replacing the previous system which allocated districts to specific counties. The 18th district was drawn within the city of Milwaukee's north side with novel boundaries—the new district's boundaries did not resemble any Milwaukee County assembly district from the pre-1972 scheme, and contained pieces of four different districts from that map (the 1st, 6th, 7th, and 13th). The last representative of the Milwaukee 6th district, Lloyd Barbee, was elected the first representative of the new 18th Assembly district in the 1972 election.

The district has remained in the same vicinity, but has crept slightly south and west in redistrictings since 1972. Though, with the exception of the court-ordered 1982 redistricting, which stretched the district into West Allis and Greenfield, it has otherwise remained entirely within the city limits of Milwaukee on the north side of Interstate 94.

== List of past representatives ==
List of representatives to the Wisconsin State Assembly from the 18th district
Member	Party	Residence	Counties represented	Term start	Term end	Ref.
District created
Lloyd Barbee	Dem.	Milwaukee	Milwaukee	January 1, 1973	January 3, 1977	
Marcia P. Coggs	Dem.	Milwaukee	Milwaukee	January 3, 1977	January 3, 1983	
Thomas A. Hauke	Dem.	West Allis	Milwaukee	January 3, 1983	January 7, 1985	
Marcia P. Coggs	Dem.	Milwaukee	Milwaukee	January 7, 1985	January 4, 1993	
Antonio R. Riley	Dem.	Milwaukee	Milwaukee	January 4, 1993	February 1, 2003	
--Vacant--			Milwaukee	February 1, 2003	April 30, 2003	
Lena Taylor	Dem.	Milwaukee	Milwaukee	April 30, 2003	January 3, 2005	
Tamara Grigsby	Dem.	Milwaukee	Milwaukee	January 3, 2005	January 7, 2013	
Evan Goyke	Dem.	Milwaukee	Milwaukee	January 7, 2013	January 6, 2025	
Margaret Arney	Dem.	Milwaukee	Milwaukee	January 6, 2025	Current	
