= Lee England Jr. =

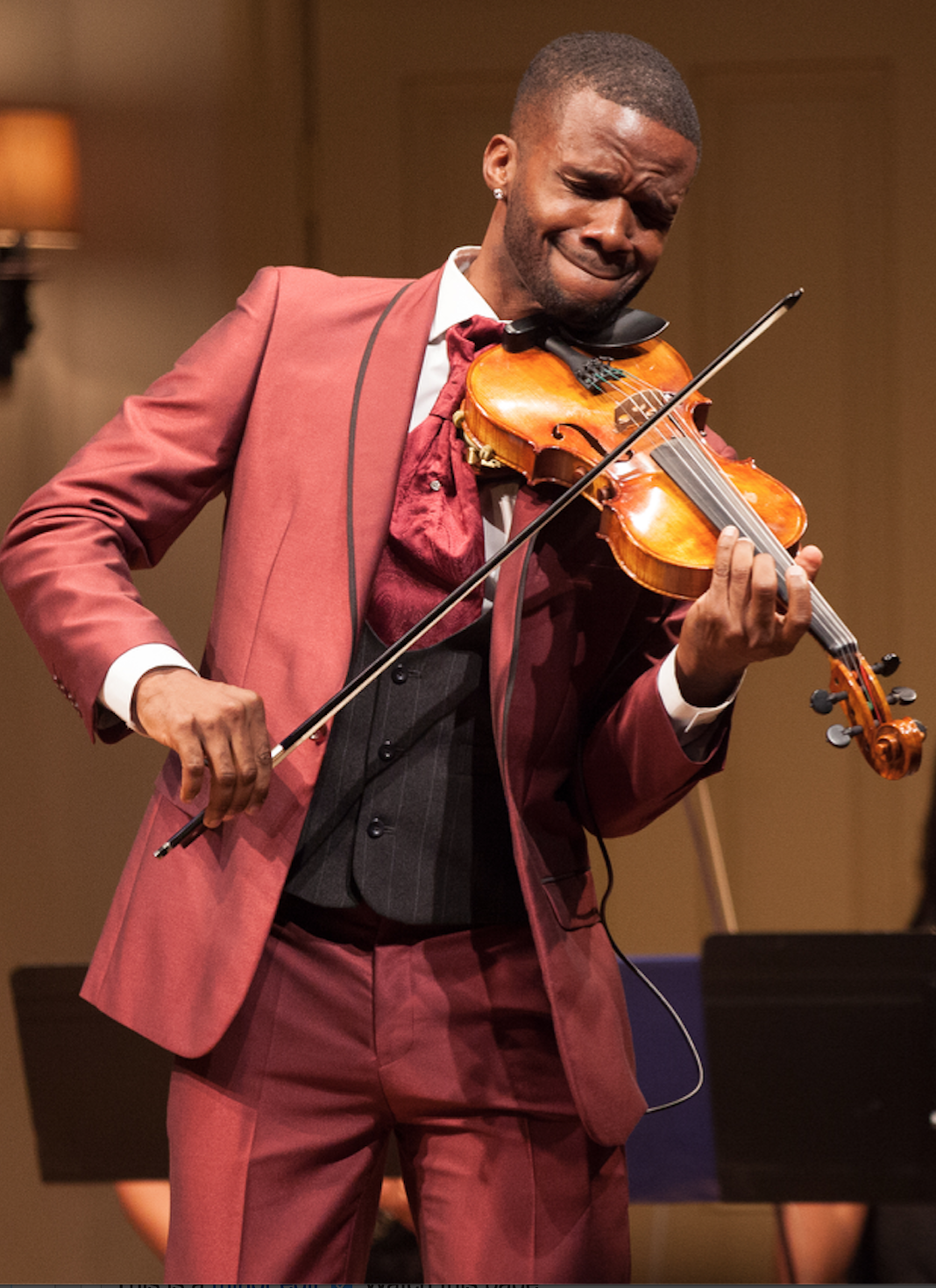
- England performing at the Geffen Playhouse Theatre

Background information
- Born: March 15, 1984 (age 42); Waukegan, Illinois, United States
- Genres: Jazz; Hip hop; Gospel
- Occupations: Violinist; arranger; singer; composer
- Instruments: Violin; vocals; viola; cello; bass; guitar; drums; piano
- Years active: 2009–present
- Website: leeenglandjr.com

Lee England Jr. (born March 15, 1984), is an American violinist, vocalist, arranger, and composer based in Los Angeles, California.

He gained recognition in 2009 after his audition for MTV's Making His Band impressed executive producer Sean Combs and landed him a spot on the show as the only "non-traditional" instrumentalist. Since then, he has been featured on shows like Jimmy Kimmel Live! and The Mo'Nique Show, and has shared the stage with musicians like Stevie Wonder, Beyoncé and Jay-Z. In 2010, England performed at a private party for Michael Jordan. Jordan was so impressed with England's abilities that he offered him an endorsement deal with his shoe brand. In 2016, England performed at the Geffen Playhouse and attracted the attention of legendary music producer, Quincy Jones; he was subsequently signed to Jones's management company: Quincy Jones Productions.

== Life and career ==
England was born and raised in Waukegan, Illinois, the home of Jack Benny, to parents Sylvia and Lee England Sr. He was first exposed to the violin at the age of 6 during a class demonstration of stringed instruments. When he first attempted to play however, he assumed his violin was broken because it didn't sound like the one shown to him in class and wanted to quit. At the request of his father, England continued to practice his instrument for just 15 minutes a day, despite his resistance.

As England continued to practice, his initial reluctance to practice was overcome by a passion for learning and growing as a musician. In 2008, he furthered his studies by attending Southern Illinois University, where he earned three separate music degrees: a BA in Violin Performance, a BS in Music Education, and a BS in Audio Engineering. After graduating, he began teaching violin to elementary students in the Chicago Public Schools system. He quickly realized, however, that he wouldn't be able to inspire children to pursue their dreams if hadn't ever tried himself. At the age of 25, England left his teaching position to pursue a performance career in music.

=== 2009–2016: Performance career ===
After leaving his teaching role, England auditioned for the MTV's Making His Band, a talent show in which performers competed to be a part of a new band. His audition was so impressive that the production team actually changed the rules to allow "non-traditional" instruments to be considered. As a result, England was dubbed the "secret weapon" of the group. England capitalized on the success following Making His Band by appearing on shows like Jimmy Kimmel Live! and The Mo'Nique Show, performing in concert with stars like Stevie Wonder, Babyface, and K'Jon, and opening for rappers like Ludacris, Jermaine Dupri, and Akon. Additionally, he produced, composed, and starred in several BET commercials.

While touring with RnB singer K'Jon, England found himself performing at a private party for Michael Jordan, Spike Lee, Russell Simmons, Dwyane Wade and Gabrielle Union in Dallas for the NBA's 2010 All-Star Weekend. Jordan was so impressed with the performance that he offered England an endorsement with his shoe brand. England became one of the first non-athletes to be sponsored by the brand. Following Jordan's endorsement, England became a popular entertainer for a variety of athletic events. He performed at shoe releases for Chris Paul and Dwyane Wade, camps for LeBron James, and halftime shows in 26 NBA arenas. Most notably, he was commissioned to compose music for, and star in, a Super Bowl XLVII commercial.

In early 2016, England performed John Legend's "All of Me" at the Geffen Playhouse in Los Angeles for an audience that included George Lucas, Elton John, Lady Gaga, and Quincy Jones. After the show, Jones approached him to discuss working together. Following the meeting, Jones produced a showcase performance for England at the Geffen's Gil Cates Theatre. Subsequently, Jones signed England to his management company: Quincy Jones Productions.

=== 2016–present: WWE performances ===
On August 20, 2016, England appeared at WWE's NXT TakeOver: Brooklyn II and played the entrance theme of wrestler Shinsuke Nakamura, "The Rising Sun" by CFO$, as he made his ring entrance for the main event against reigning NXT Champion Samoa Joe. England also appeared on the April 4, 2017, episode of SmackDown Live for Nakamura's main roster debut. England returned to WWE on August 20, at SummerSlam performing Nakamura's entrance prior to his match against Jinder Mahal, for the WWE Championship.

England performed "The Rising Sun" for Nakamura's WWE-sanctioned special appearance for Pro Wrestling Noah's Noah The New Year 2023 event on January 1, 2023.

== Discography ==
- Cover Art (2016)
