= Michael Meyerhofer =

American poet and writer (born 1977)

Michael Meyerhofer is a contemporary poet and fiction writer. He was born in Iowa in 1977, received his Bachelor of Arts in English from the University of Iowa in 2000, and his Master of Fine Arts in Creative Writing from Southern Illinois University Carbondale in 2006. He currently teaches as a visiting professor at DeVry University in Fresno, California Retrieved on December 18, 2014.

His debut novel, Wytchfire, was released in 2014 from Red Adept Publishing.

== Work ==
Poetry

Meyerhofer’s first book of poems, Leaving Iowa, won the Liam Rector First Book Award from Briery Creek Press in 2006. The book was hailed by notable poets and critics including Rodney Jones, Allison Joseph, and Karen Craigo. Said Rodney Jones: "Meyerhofer has the inner resources and the craft to address worlds imagined and ideal, but he insists on writing chiefly of this one, and he does it fearlessly, making neither warmth nor anger…. He reminds me of a young James Wright. He reveals the heart as do few other poets who have suffered an education." Joseph called Leaving Iowa "…the start of a career that will mean much to those readers of poetry in search of a writer who will never falter in telling them the hard yet gorgeous truths of life." Said Craigo, "What is striking about [Leaving Iowa] is its unabashed confessionalism. But it is confessionalism that has an effect on the reader—not just the effect of catharsis for the writer, like so many poems that tread into personal black waters."

Meyerhofer’s second book of poems, Blue Collar Eulogies, was published by Steel Toe Books in 2009. The book won the praise of poets George Bilgere and Dorianne Laux. Said Bilgere, "Meyerhofer’s tough, lovely poems remind us that the aim of being human… is to rise above ourselves, to take this sorry predicament and turn it into something shining and valuable." Added Laux, "I like these poems, kinetic and half-crazed, they remind me that poetry is an explosion, that energy plus mass equals a dark magic."

Meyerhofer's third book of poems, Damnatio Memoriae, was published by Brick Road Poetry Press in June, 2011. The title refers to the ancient Roman practice of "condemning memory"—that is, formally voting to erase traitors to Rome from memory. "These poems wake you up with their surprising twists, with the intensity of their speakers, and with the inventiveness of their lines and concepts. Sometimes these poems even risk offending the reader by tampering with archetypes, as in "Hansel’s Redemption" where the question of what ever happened to Hansel and Gretel is answered with a scandalous narrative. As you may have guessed, Damnatio Memoriae easily asserted itself as the winner of our inaugural Brick Road Poetry Prize." [Keith Badowski & Ron Self Brick Road Poetry Press Columbus, GA; https://www.amazon.com/Damnatio-Memoriae-Michael-Meyerhofer/dp/0984100555/ref=sr_1_fkmr0_1?ie=UTF8&qid=1418903287&sr=8-1-fkmr0&keywords=Damnatio+Memoriae.+Brick+Road+Poetry+Press.+June+2011] Retrieved on December 18, 2014.

Meyerhofer's fourth book of poems, What To Do If You're Buried Alive, is forthcoming in April, 2015 from Split Lip Press. Retrieved on December 18, 2014.

Meyerhofer has also published four poetry chapbooks, all through contests. His first, Cardboard Urn, won the Copperdome Chapbook Contest from Southeast Missouri State University Press in 2005. His second, The Right Madness of Beggars, won the 3rd Annual Uccelli Press Chapbook Competition from Uccelli Press in 2006. His third, Real Courage, won the Terminus Magazine and Jeanne Duval Editions Poetry Chapbook Prize in 2007. His fourth, The Clay-Shaper’s Husband, won the Codhill Press Chapbook Award from Codhill Press in 2008.

Meyerhofer has also won numerous other poetry awards, including the Annie Finch Prize for Poetry from National Poetry Review in 2006, the James Wright Poetry Award from Mid-American Review in 2006, the Laureate Prize for Poetry (also from National Poetry Review) in 2007, and the Marjorie J. Wilson Best Poem Contest from MARGIE in 2009.

Meyerhofer’s work has also been praised by other poets, including Thomas Lux and Djelloul Marbrook. Said Thomas Lux, "Sometimes, Michael Meyerhofer’s poems are excruciatingly tender, the next moment (or poem) blistering satire, the next walk-into-a-wall funny. The one thing that’s predictable about his poems is that they are unpredictable. I think it’s almost time for the poets of my generation to start picking out chairs on the rest home porch. There’s a whole new generation coming up, and they mean business, and Meyerhofer is one of them. I will read every word he writes until I can read no more." Said Marbrook, "…Meyerhofer is always the poet who sees what we don’t want to see precisely when we least want to see it. If there is a thing to be said that decorum would rather skirt, he is going to say it, and yet, curiously, he is not a poet you have to be up to. He comes upon you like weather."

Meyerhofer’s poems have appeared in nationally recognized journals like Ploughshares, Rosebud, Atlanta Review, North American Review, Modern Haiku and Verse Daily.

Fiction

His first novel, "Wytchfire", is currently available from Red Adept Publishing. It can be purchased through Amazon as well. The first novel in the Dragonkin Trilogy, "Wytchfire" will be followed by two sequels, "The Knight of the Crane" and "The War of the Lotus," both finished and forthcoming by Red Adept Publishing. Retrieved on December 18, 2014.

Meyerhofer has also published science fiction, fantasy, and literary fiction pieces in Asimov’s Science Fiction Magazine, Quick Fiction, Sentence, Planet Magazine, Absent Willow Review, Scythe Literary Review and other journals. He also published speculative fiction novellas.

== Bibliography ==
=== Poetry ===
Collections

- Leaving Iowa.
- Blue Collar Eulogies. Steel Toe Books. 2009.
- Damnatio Memoriae. Brick Road Poetry Press. 2011.

List of poems

Title	Year	First published	Reprinted/collected
If Horror Movies Have Taught Me Anything	2014	Meyerhofer, Michael (October–November 2014). "If Horror Movies Have Taught Me Anything". Asimov's Science Fiction. 38 (10–11): 97.	

=== Novels ===
- Wytchfire. Red Adept Publishing. 2014.
