= List of killings by law enforcement officers in the United States, February 2026 =

This is a list of people reported killed by non-military law enforcement officers in the United States in February 2026, whether in the line of duty or not, and regardless of reason or method. The listing documents the occurrence of a death, making no implications regarding wrongdoing or justification on the part of the person killed or officer involved. Killings are arranged by date of the incident that caused death. Different death dates, if known, are noted in the description. The table below lists 108 people.

== February 2026 ==
Date	Name (age) of deceased	Race	Location	Description
2026-02-28	Willie Felton Foster Jr. (69)	Black	San Luis Obispo, California	A man was killed in an officer-involved shooting after holding up a replica firearm while actively yelling. The shooting happened after officers confronted the man. The footage was released.
2026-02-27	Steven "Stevie" Jones (55)	Black	Hartford, Connecticut	Jones called police to report he was experiencing a mental health crisis and was going to harm himself. One officer attempted to use a taser, but it was ineffective. A group of police officers spoke to Jones and asked him to calm down. Another officer then arrived and, within 30 seconds, shot Jones as he kept approaching the officer with a knife. Jones died of his injuries a few days later. The footage was released. Mayor Arunan Arulampalam later fired the officer who shot Jones.
2026-02-27	Jesus A. Gonzalez (41)	Hispanic	Phoenix, Arizona	Phoenix Police came to assist DPS troopers. During the encounter, Gonzalez refused to surrender and kept accelerating his vehicle despite it was attached to a grappler device on a DPS Police cruiser. When officers attempted to break the window, an officer fired his rifle after yelling "don't reach for it", though no firearm was recovered.The footage was released.
2026-02-27	unidentified male	Unknown	Galt, California	During the morning hours, Sacramento County Sheriff's deputies responded to a report of a woman in distress. After arriving on scene, deputies contacted both a man and a woman. After speaking with the woman, who said she was not safe, she was brought to a patrol vehicle for her safety. The man pulled out a shotgun from his vehicle and officers demand to drop it. One deputy fatally shot the man, killing him on-scene.
2026-02-26	Raevon Milton (26)	White	Greensboro, North Carolina	During a domestic disturbance investigation, Milton shot at officers before leaving in a car. He eventually returned and was shot by GPD officers when he fired at them. Milton suffered injuries and died on March 2, 2026. The officers' actions had been justified by district attorney's office in July. No body camera footage of the incident has been shared with the public.
2026-02-26	Bonnie Bouffard (70)	White	Plantation, Florida	Multiple agencies were pursuing a driver fleeing officers in a suspected stolen vehicle. After several crashes, an officer performed a PIT maneuver to terminate the chase. The suspect's vehicle then collided with the victim's vehicle, killing Bouffard.
2026-02-26	Joaquin Anthony Pereya (46)	White	Walnut Creek, California	WCPD responded to a call about a man wearing dark clothing looking into homes and parked cars with a flashlight. Upon arrival, officers ordered him to drop his weapon but he did not comply before officers opened fire. The weapon was later confirmed as a pellet gun. His mother claimed he had mental health issues and wasn't allowed to purchase a gun. WCPD released the footage.
2026-02-25	Eslam Ahmed Hegazy (38)	Middle Eastern (Asian)	Vestal, New York	Vestal Police responded to a mental health crisis call regarding a man. During the encounter, Hegazy was armed with a knife and threatening self-harm and threwing a television at officers. They shot him when Hegazy approached them with the knife. The footage had been released.
2026-02-25	Charles Curtis McCloud Jr. (44)	Black	Pahokee, Florida	Palm Beach County Police initially responded to a shooting. At the scene, they found two men dead from gunshot wounds. Moments later, they received another call about a shooting at a residence, nobody was injured and police learned the suspect drove a black SUV. The suspect then drove to a convenience store and shot another man, whom is expected to survive. A deputy who was placing crime scene tape at the second crime scene location encountered the suspect, McCloud Jr.. McCloud Jr. subsequently struck the deputy with his vehicle, knocking the deputy 40 feet back. He would then exit his vehicle and attempted to shoot the deputy. The deputy managed to retrieve his service weapon and shot McCloud Jr. to death. A detective at the scene also fired his weapon.
2026-02-25	Francis Collier (38)	White	Bala Cynwyd, Pennsylvania	Police attempted to arrest Collier, a former Morton Police officer, on charges that he raped a female family member when she was a child. After locating Collier near the Saint Joseph's University campus, officers killed Collier in a shoot-out.
2026-02-25	Richard Sheppard (47)	Unknown	Spokane, Washington	SPD initiated a SWAT operation on a suspect who killed a man in a stabbing over the weekend. Officers shot the suspect as the suspect was armed and non-cooperative.
2026-02-24	Nurul Amin Shah Alam (56)	Rohingya	Buffalo, New York	Shah Alam was a nearly blind Rohingya refugee who died after CBP agents dropped him off on the streets of Buffalo in the night. He was found dead on February 24. The county medical examiner found his death resulted from complications brought on by hypothermia and dehydration and ruled his death a homicide on April 1, 2026, which means the death was resulted from another person's actions or inaction but is not a determination that it was a crime.
2026-02-24	Calixto Felix Mendoza (49)	Unknown	Porterville, California	A man was killed by a Tulare County deputy after refusing to talk, fleeing from police, and attacking an officer with a long piece of wood while conducting a routine patrol on the northeast side of the Tule River.
2026-02-24	Dwight Hawkins (38)	Black	Baltimore, Maryland	Police encountered a man in a Belair-Edison liquor store who they believed was in possession of a firearm despite being prohibited to own one. Officers pursued the man out of the store and shot him as he ran, holding the gun in his right hand. One of the officers involved in this incident, Omar Rodriguez, had involved in a fatal shooting of another man, Bilal Abdullah, in June, 2025 and just returned to duty after being cleared in January. The footage was released.
2026-02-24	Ricardo Davis (29)	Black	Parma, Ohio	Parma Police initiated a traffic stop on a reported suicidal male for a welfare check. At some point, he reached toward backseat and approached officers while armed. The officers then fatally shot him. The following footage was released.
2026-02-24	Aleksander Shablykin (32)	White	Gig Harbor, Washington	Police were called on Shablykin for violating a no-contact order, though it was not yet valid as it not had been served on him. While deputies were en route, additional calls were made saying Shablykin had begun stabbing people outside the home. Deputies arrived and shot him. Three stabbing victims died at the scene, and a fourth died on the way to the hospital.
2026-02-23	Ty Jacob Doolen (39)	White	Decatur, Illinois	Decatur Police officers responded to Doolen’s home to conduct a welfare check on Doolen. Doolen refused to go into non-arrest police custody and the situation escalated. Police used force to arrest him before he started showing respiratory distress, which later led to his death.The footage was released.
2026-02-23	Dylan Rockford Fohrenkam (34)	Unknown	Phoenix, Arizona	Phoenix Officers responded to a call about a man pointing a gun at his daughters. After a brief pursuit, the officers tried to subdue him with less-lethal means but failed. Another officer then got behind the suspect and tackled him. When they fell on the ground, the suspect's gun went off, killing the suspect and injuring the officer.The footage was released.
2026-02-23	Richard Dean Bird (45)	White	Reeds Spring, Missouri	A manhunt was issued for Bird after he killed Christian County Sheriff's Deputy Gabriel Ramirez on February 23 in Highlandville. Bird was located near Reeds Spring, and in the ensuing shoot-out, during which Deputy Michael Hislope and Bird were killed, and two other deputies were injured. The sheriff's office said the footage was released on YouTube channel Midwest Safety due to human error. The footage was on the website.
2026-02-23	Joel Cortez (48)	Unknown	Irving, Texas	During the evening hours, officers stopped a vehicle before attempting to take the driver into custody for possession of narcotics, but the man resisted and started a fight with the officers. The man sustained injuries during the fight and was taken to a nearby hospital where he was pronounced deceased. It was unknown if a weapon was used.
2026-02-23	Jason Alexander Trexley (43)	White	Albemarle, North Carolina	A man was killed by Stanly County Sheriff while attempting to serve multiple warrants that ended with shots being fired at a house located four miles west of Albemarle.
2026-02-23	David Morales (30)	Unknown	Big Spring, Texas	A vehicle fled the scene after DPS troopers attempted to conduct a traffic stop. Police later performed a PIT maneuver on the vehicle to end the chase. A gunfight would ensue between a trooper and two suspects, during which, a suspect was shot and killed while the trooper was injured. The second suspect fled and was arrested a day later.
2026-02-23	Eddie Darren Duncan (24)	Black	Brooklyn Center, Minnesota	A man who was recently released from jail shot and killed two of his cousins, an adult and a teenager, in a Minneapolis home. Brooklyn Center Police later killed the man in a shootout.
2026-02-23	Chhatra Thapa (50)	Asian	Mantua, Virginia	Fairfax County officers responded to a domestic disturbance call at an apartment. The suspect's son-in-law, who was cleaning snow off his car, heard the commotion and called 911, saying that the man had stabbed his wife and daughter to death with a 10-inch curved dagger. When officers arrived, the man was found stabbing his son-in-law before officers fatally shot the man to death. The son-in-law was taken to a nearby hospital.FCPD released the footage.
2026-02-22	Luis Guerrero	Hispanic	Houston, Texas	HPD officers shot an armed man following a call about someone firing a gun inside a Southwest Houston Comfort Inn and Suites hotel.The footage was released.
2026-02-22	unidentified male (45)	Unknown	Houston, Texas	METRO police officers fatally shot a man who went off the train and drew a weapon on the Bell Station platform. Police said the incident stemmed from a domestic dispute on the train.
2026-02-22	unidentified male	Unknown	Heidelberg, Pennsylvania	Police responded to a 911 call from a person claiming to be armed and threatening to harm themselves inside a home. When police officers arrived, the man charged at them with a knife before they tased him. A Scott Township officer shot him when he continued to approach.
2026-02-22	Austin Tucker Martin (21)	White	Palm Beach, Florida	The United States Secret Service and one Palm Beach County deputy fatally shot an armed man from Cameron, North Carolina after an "unauthorized entry" into the secure perimeter at President Donald Trump's Mar-a-Lago estate.
2026-02-21	Patrick Rowe (54)	Unknown	Lawrence County, Alabama	Police responded to a report about a suicidal man armed with a gun. Upon arrival, Rowe can be seen sitting in a chair through an open door. He pointed a gun at Lawrence County deputies before they opened fire.
2026-02-20	Jefferson Josue Rodas	Unknown	Pflugerville, Texas	A gunman opened fire on patrons and employees inside the Seven Fades Hair Studio barber shop. An off-duty Austin officer, who was a patron, returned fire and shot the man dead. An employee was injured by gunfire.
2026-02-20	Matthew Leija (26)	Hispanic	Dallas, Texas	Both Dallas Police and SWAT were executing a search warrant at a West Dallas home. After the SWAT made entry, the man pulled out a gun and aimed it at officers. Officers discharged their weapons, killing him on-scene. The footage was released by police.
2026-02-19	unidentified male	Unknown	Poinciana, Florida	An Osceola County Sheriff's deputy shot and killed an armed shoplifter inside the Cypress Parkway Walmart in Poinciana during the evening hours. Osceola County officials confirmed that a Walmart loss prevention officer notified a deputy about three men inside with concealed merchandise. Both the officer and the deputy attempted to meet the men, but all three took off running. One man had a gun in his hand and the deputy fatally shot him. An officer would later confirm that the man ran through the store with a gun in his hand and was approaching other customers, and the other two men left the store. The officer who fatally shot the man was immediately placed on administrative leave afterward. A few seconds from the bodycam was released.
2026-02-19	Everard Walker (53)	Black	Hartford, Connecticut	Officers responded to an apartment during the late morning hours to assist with a mental health evaluation. During the evaluation, the man pulled out a knife, and was fatally shot by an officer. The footage was released.
2026-02-19	Hunter Munoz (24)	White	Des Moines, Iowa	Police responded to a mental health clinic where a security officer was stabbed. When they located the suspect, he approached officers with a knife despite being tased. Two officers fired shots and killed him. The injured security officer remains in critical condition. The footage was released.
2026-02-19	Fabian Leon (44)	Hispanic	Henderson, Nevada	HPD shot a man who was chasing his ex-girlfriend with a knife following a domestic disturbance call. The footage was released.
2026-02-19	Nawras Mahmud (31)	Unknown	Lawrenceville, Georgia	Police responded to a domestic violence call in regard of a stabbing. The caller was injured. When officers arrived, the suspect approached them with a knife. They shot him in defense.
2026-02-18	Gerlinde Spring Lynch (47)	White	Oregon City, Oregon	A woman who was arrested by Oregon City Police was transported to jail. While the woman was being booked into the a jail, she was uncooperative before Clackamas County deputies attempted to retrain her. At some point, she suffered a cardiac arrest caused by a combination of methamphetamine toxicity, physical restraint, obesity and hypertensive cardiovascular disease before dying. During the struggle, Lynch was heard shouting "I can't breathe" and one deputy told others to "lean her forward" when she was on a restraint chair before they began using body weight to force Lynch into a forward position, which is an inappropriate conduct. Her death was ruled a homicide in August and the footage was released. The district attorney declined to file charges against the deputies and ruled that they weren't criminally negligent.
2026-02-18	Da'Quain Johnson (32)	Black	Grand Rapids, Michigan	A GRPD K9 unit followed an evading bicyclist to a parking lot of an apartment complex on the suspicion that he was armed. After restraining the man with a police dog, an officer alleged the man was reaching for a gun. An officer then shot the man three times, including in the back of the head. Bodycam and witness footage was released.
2026-02-18	Andre Mendez (33)	Hispanic	San Marcos, California	A traffic stop involving a red late-2000s Hyundai Sonata turned deadly after a man opened fire at deputies despite being ordered to drop the gun for minutes, before the man was fatally shot and killed by several deputies.The footage was released.
2026-02-18	unidentified male	Unknown	Pensacola, Florida	Police were called to reports of a man firing a gun in an apartment building at the Carlton Palms Condominiums. Officers located the suspect in the parking lot and shot him after he allegedly refused to drop his gun.
2026-02-17	Miguel Bravo Gonzalez (47)	Hispanic	Lancaster, California	Los Angeles County deputies were pursuing a vehicle connected to a murder investigation. They deployed spike strips before vehicle lost control and crashed. A passenger was killed in the crash.
2026-02-17	Robert Lewis (71)	Unknown	Overland, Missouri	A search warrant in Overland turned into a standoff with Woodson Terrace Police. After all but one person in the home surrendered, police shot and killed the last man after he allegedly refused to drop a gun.
2026-02-17	Christopher Allen Smith (52)	Unknown	Abingdon, Virginia	Washington County Sheriff’s Office attempted to serve an Emergency Custody Order on Smith. During the encounter, he reportedly fought with deputies and threatened them with a knife. The deputies then shot him in respond.
2026-02-17	Dylan Leonard	White	Las Cruces, New Mexico	First responders responded to a fire, where they found a man in a garage. They encountered resistance so they turned the scene to the sheriff's office. The man cut a deputy when Doña Ana County Sheriff's Office deputies opened fire.
2026-02-16	Samuel Brown (56)	Black	Woodlawn, Maryland	An officer found Brown asleep in a vehicle at a stoplight. The two got into an argument, leading to a scuffle in which the officer punched Brown twice. Brown hit his head on the concrete. He died of his injuries on February 27. The footage had been released.
2026-02-16	Ronald Wilbert Wilson (73)	Black	Tamarac, Florida	During a pursuit of an unrelated suspect, a Broward County deputy attempted to perform a PIT maneuver but failed. He lost control and collided with a civilian vehicle, killing Wilson and injuring another person.
2026-02-16	Hermelindo Morete-Dista (27)	Hispanic	Marietta, Georgia	Cobb County Police responded to a report regarding an armed man when gunshots were heard upon arrival. When they found the man, he reportedly did not comply to drop his gun before being fatally shot.
2026-02-16	Aaron Ammann (33)	White	Moses Lake, Washington	Grant County Sheriff’s Office deputies and Moses Lake Police Department officers went to the site of the incident in association with an open investigation. A man was seen walking around the property and was suicidal. When deputies search the property, the man who was armed with his rifle, said he don't want to harm law enforcement officers while making suicidal statements, and yelled "center mass". Five deputies opened fire. The initial report said he pointed the rifle at deputies, though the later released footage disputes this.
2026-02-16	Alfredo Alves (23)	Hispanic	Brockton, Massachusetts	Off-duty HPD Officer Thomas Hayes was accused of fatally striking someone with his vehicle and fleeing the scene after a night of drinking. Alves' body was found on Monday morning. Hayes pleaded not guilty to charges of leaving the scene of an accident following personal injury or death and motor vehicle homicide.
2026-02-15	unidentified male (37)	Hispanic	Palos Hills, Illinois	Officers responded to a domestic disturbance call. A 911 caller said a male suspect had a shotgun and was going to harm his girlfriend and her children. Officers met the man at their home. Something happened and they opened fire and fatally shot the man.
2026-02-14	unidentified male (33)	Unknown	Tuscaloosa, Alabama	
2026-02-14	Alexis E. Skoczylas (35)	White	Sanborn, New York	Off-duty Buffalo officer Lance Woods shot and killed his wife under unclear circumstances and was charged with second-degree murder.
2026-02-14	Luis Felipe Londono Ospina (43)	Hispanic	Fort Lauderdale, Florida	During an unrelated call in the South Middle River neighborhood, a man approached police while armed and fired a shot, leading three officers to return fire. The footage was released.
2026-02-14	unidentified male (35)	Unknown	Roswell, New Mexico	During a domestic disturbance investigation, a man approached RPD officers with a knife before being shot.
2026-02-13	Jeffery Foster (45)	Black	Madison County, Texas	Foster, a man who shot and killed two coworkers at an oil pad site off FM 2346 and critically injured a woman in a convenience store, was being pursued by DPS troopers. Troopers later flip the car and tased him to take him into custody. He lost conscious in a DPS patrol car and was pronounced dead at the county jail.
2026-02-13	Charles Back (69)	Unknown	Apache Junction, Arizona	Police were called to a disturbance involving an armed man in a vehicle. Police located the man and shot him during the ensuing interaction. Police said officers shot Back after he pointed a BB gun resembling a real handgun at them.
2026-02-13	Cody Joe Henderson (45)	White	Yantis, Texas	Wood County deputies along with DPS troopers were trying to serve six felony warrants on a man. During the hours-long standoff, a shootout occurred when officers breached the home, which left the suspect dead. A deputy and a trooper are in critical but stable condition after being shot by the suspect.
2026-02-13	Rosia Williams (39)	White	Collins, Mississippi	CPD responded to a call regarding a subject armed with a weapon. The subject approached officers with the weapon when the subject was fatally shot.
2026-02-13	Jorge Narvaez (52)	Hispanic	Villa Rica, Georgia	Police responded to a road rage following a domestic dispute involving the man's wife and another person. As the pair attempted to flee, the man, from Carrollton, Georgia, followed them. Officers located both vehicles on Interstate 20 eastbound near mile marker 30. The man exited his vehicle holding a firearm and walked toward his wife's car and a responding officer. Two officers fatally shot the suspect, and the man was pronounced dead on-scene.
2026-02-13	Jose Cabrera (62)	Hispanic	Jacksonville, Florida	JSO officers responded to a domestic disturbance where they encountered Cabrera, who exited his car armed with a knife, approached officers and made statements indicating suicide by cop. Three officers shot him. The footage had been released.
2026-02-12	Christopher Bowman (62)	Unknown	Seattle, Washington	SPD were responding to a domestic violence call from a woman who said her ex-boyfriend was following her. Upon arrival, Bowman pointed a gun at them and officers fired back. Bowman died on Feb. 25. Bowman had an active warrant out of Kansas for rape, aggravated kidnapping, aggravated robbery and criminal possession of a firearm, the documents said in 1994. SPD released the report and the footage.
2026-02-12	unidentified male	Unknown	Waldorf, Maryland	An on-duty Maryland state trooper was driving north on Crain Highway in Waldorf when they struck a man walking in the road. The man was the hit by other vehicles and died.
2026-02-12	Sanjuanita Coronado (44)	Unknown	Mobile, Alabama	An off-duty Prichard officer shot and killed his roommate during an altercation. The officer called the police following the incident.
2026-02-11	Demarcus Irish (36)	Black	White Plains, Maryland	Officers attempting to arrest a man who had an active arrest warrant and protective order stemming from escalating domestic-related incidents when the man pulled out a large machete and advance towards them. Two officers fatally shot the suspect. The footage was released.
2026-02-11	Julian Marquette Bailey (43)	Black	Washington, D.C.	A US Marshal shot a man who reportedly had robbed a Northeast D.C. convenience store.
2026-02-11	Jadarrian O'Neal Clemons (25)	Black	Montgomery, Alabama	Officers with the Metro Area Crime Suppression (MACS) Unit conducted a traffic stop on Clemons for reasons unknown, but he fled the scene. He would subsequently exit the vehicle, flee into a nearby shed, and shoot an ALEA agent multiple times before being killed by returned fire. The assisted agencies include FBI, ATF, US Marshals, Alabama Attorney General’s Office, Montgomery County Sheriff’s Office, and MPD.
2026-02-10	Floriberto Perez-Nieto (34)	Hispanic	Johns Island, South Carolina	Charleston County deputies spotted a suspected vehicle at a gas station following a shots fired call on Johns Island. After attempting a traffic stop on the vehicle, the suspect fled and drove back to a home and fled into a wooded area on foot armed with a handgun. The deputies tased him before a gunfight ensued, during which, they fatally shot him.
2026-02-10	Michael Wayne Jones (52)	White	Jacksonville, Florida	JSO officers attempted to stop a stolen vehicle but the driver fled on foot. When officers stunned him with a taser, he pulled out a gun before they opened fire. Jones had fled from police during the other encounter with officers on Jan. 30. Police released the footage.
2026-02-10	Donald Felver III (30)	White	Duluth, Minnesota	Deputies stopped a man for reckless driving. After fleeing the traffic stop, the man stopped again. The man fired at police, and two deputies shot him. Police believe that the man was a homicide suspect. The footage was released.
2026-02-10	Michael Hopkins Smith (61)	White	Broadway, Virginia	BPD officers responded to the scene where a man reportedly threatened patrons inside a 7-Eleven with the knife. He was shot when he came toward one of the officers.
2026-02-10	Dominic Diaz (32)	Hispanic	Goodyear, Arizona	Police were called to a reported retail theft. An officer got into a scuffle with the suspect, during which the officer's gun went off, grazing his calf. The officer shot and killed the suspect after he allegedly continued reaching for the gun.
2026-02-10	Gaven Johnson (23)	Unknown	Queen Creek, Arizona	A hit-and-run suspect was shot dead by Queen Creek Police after he fired at them and injured two officers.
2026-02-09	Arben Pilici (49)	Unknown	Dekalb County, Georgia	
2026-02-09	Anthony Anderson (40)	White	San Leandro, California	A man called police to report he was armed with a gun and wanted to harm others. Alameda County Deputies shot and killed the man when he approached them holding a pipe, which deputies mistook for a gun.
2026-02-08	Ruben Cordova Ramirez (60)	Hispanic	Amarillo, Texas	
2026-02-08	James Thomas (22)	Hispanic	Dallas, Texas	Police responded to a call regarding a suicidal person. When they encountered the man, he was initially armed with a boxcutter before lunging at an officer, reaching for the officer's gun. The officers then shot him. Dallas Police released the footage.
2026-02-08	Johnny Ray Morales (28)	Hispanic	Las Cruces, New Mexico	An off-duty LCPD officer working at a Walmart was flagged down regarding a bicycle theft. When he attempted to arrest the suspect, Morales, Morales fired at him. The officer and four responding officers returned fire. LCPD released the footage.
2026-02-08	Bryan Axel Ramirez Gomez (17)	Hispanic	Elkhart, Indiana	At around 1:30 am, an Elkhart police officer reported seeing a suspicious vehicle at the High Dive Park Pavilion which was closed at the time. The officer subsequently made contact with the individuals in the car including an adult driver and various passengers, some of whom were juveniles. At 1:50 am the officer and his backup fired upon the 17 year old, as the juvenile pulled out a gun from the car and raised toward an officer. Police later found a gun beside Gomez and another on the front passenger floorboard of the car, with a switch making it fully automatic. The footage was released after multiple requests and the two officers' actions were ruled justified by the prosecutors' office.
2026-02-08	unidentified male	Unknown	Philipsburg, Montana	Deputies responded to a report about a suspect had threatened bar patrons with a gun. When they located him, a brief pursuit ensued on Montana Highway 1. An officer shot the suspect when he pointed a gun at the officer.
2026-02-08	Steven Pence (74)	White	Lincoln County, Oklahoma	Police shot and killed Pence during a report of a suicidal person after he allegedly pointed a gun at police. Pence was a former Oklahoma County Sheriff's deputy who retired in 2018.
2026-02-08	Michael Glunt (33)	White	Tulsa, Oklahoma	TPD were dispatched to conduct a welfare check on a man after receiving a call from his family. When officers confronted him on a sidewalk, he drew a revolver and shot at them before the officers shot back. The officer's bodycam wasn't activated during the encounter so the shooting wasn't recorded. Other officers bodycam showed the aftermath of the shooting. On April 10, the Tulsa County District Attorney’s Office determined that the fatal police shooting of Michael Glunt was justified under Oklahoma law.
2026-02-08	Nigel Vaughn (40)	Black	Fall River, Massachusetts	During the midnight hours, Fall River officers questioned Vaughn after being released at a gas station after officers investigated a reckless driving complaint. The suspect pulled out a gun, wounding two officers, before being fatally shot by them. The footage had been released and the officers' actions were justified by the district attorney.
2026-02-07	Karen Ivette Gomez (52)	White	Miami Gardens, Florida	Police were called to a report that Gomez was harming herself with a knife. During the call, one deputy used a taser and another shot Gomez.
2026-02-07	Kenneth Ortega (30)	Hispanic	Skowhegan, Maine	A New York man was shot dead by a Skowhegan police officer after he reportedly fired a gun in the air before pointing it at them.
2026-02-07	Alicia Shelton (43)	White	Grants Pass, Oregon	Grants Pass Police shot Shelton, who was reportedly holding a gun.
2026-02-07	Glenn Eugene Reed (44)	White	Tulsa, Oklahoma	TPD officers were flagged down by a woman because a man threatened her with a machete. Despite less-lethal efforts, two officers fatally shot him when he charged toward them with the weapon.
2026-02-07	Ricardo Delafuente (58)	Hispanic	Waukegan, Illinois	A man was shot and killed by a Waukegan officer in a call involving the individual attempting to commit suicide. Only a few details were released.
2026-02-06	James Bennett (45)	Native American	Billings, Montana	Police tried to stop an apparent stolen vehicle with weapons inside before the vehicle fled. Yellowstone County deputies at Blue Creek area deployed spike strips and MHP troopers conducted a PIT maneuver on a suspected vehicle, ending the pursuit. A suspect reportedly pointed a gun at them before being fatally shot during the standoff.
2026-02-06	Rudy Eswin Rosario (38)	Hispanic	San Jacinto, California	When Riverside County Sheriff's deputies found a hit-and-run suspect and attempted to arrest him, he produced a gun. The deputies then fatally shot him. The footage had been released.
2026-02-06	unidentified male	Unknown	Federal Way, Washington	FWPD responded to an intersection where a car was blocking the roadway. The officers then attempted to contact the driver, who then fled on foot and attempted to carjack someone driving by. An officer subsequently shot him.
2026-02-05	Francisco Canales Aguilar (54)	Unknown	Coolidge, Arizona	CPD officers responded to a domestic disturbance in front of their police station. Upon arrival, the suspect, the caller's estranged husband, displayed a machete and refused to drop it. At least one officer shot him when he ran toward them. The footage was released.
2026-02-05	Daniel Kennedy (60)	White	Lowell, Massachusetts	Kennedy, a retired Gloucester Fire Department lieutenant, died several days after being struck by a Lowell police cruiser.
2026-02-05	Holman Gomez (39)	Hispanic	Los Angeles, California	LAPD responded to the parking lot of the California Science Center after a motorcycle officer spotted Gomez, who appeared to be armed with a rifle. The officers fatally shot him. Gomez was holding an air rifle. The footage was released.
2026-02-05	Erik D. Sherrer (57)	Unknown	Portland, Oregon	Sherrer pulled out a gun and pulled the trigger on a security guard on January 31, but the gun did not go off. A shotgun was found in his backpack but he fled the scene. Police also said they found threatening messages written on shotgun shells that specifically named President Donald Trump. Portland Police served a warrant on him, deploying tear gas. Sherrer exited the apartment and pointed a gun at a detective before two officers shot him. Multnomah County District Attorney ruled the shooting justified. The footage was released.
2026-02-04	Christopher Erb (44)	White	Nashville, North Carolina	Nash County Police responded to domestic dispute outside of Nashville regarding Erb, who reportedly wielded a knife, struck his wife in the mouth, threatened to kill her, and tried to commit suicide by cop. Deputies attempted to negotiate with him but he threatened them and confronted them with a rifle. A sergeant shot him when he walked toward them while raising his weapon.
2026-02-04	Saber Bernard (18)	Black	Marion, Iowa	Bernard asked a neighbor to call the police so that he could speak to them. When MPD arrived, Bernard advanced toward them after pulling out a concealed machete. An officer shot him after unsuccessfully tasing him. The footage was released.
2026-02-03	Brooks Plemmons (40)	White	Lexington, Kentucky	Lexington Police were trying to execute a felony arrest warrant on Plemmons during a traffic stop and shot him in the encounter. A gun was recovered at the scene. He died at a hospital a few days later. He was wanted on first-degree kidnapping, assault by strangulation, discharge of a weapon on occupied property, possession of firearm by convicted felon and other charges in North Carolina.
2026-02-03	Jason Todd Shaw (43)	White	Tooele, Utah	TPD officers were conducting a shooting investigation at a dirt parking lot when a man armed with a gun arrived. The officers fired at the man, killing him.
2026-02-03	Joshua Wippert (38)	White	Milwaukee, Wisconsin	Milwaukee officers briefly pulled over a man for a registration violation in the Sherman Park neighborhood before driving away. After arriving in the Golden Valley neighborhood, the man (armed with a gun) and his passenger got out of the vehicle and ran off on foot. Two officers fatally shot the man after giving verbal commands and the officers were placed on administrative leave. The footage and police report were released.
2026-02-03	Roman Kirby (51)	White	Albuquerque, New Mexico	APD officers responded to reports of a reckless driving before locating the suspect in an arroyo near I-40, who they said was armed and had an extensive criminal history. Despite negotiating for six hours, the suspect shot the drone and pointed a gun at officers. The officers opened fire.
2026-02-03	Evelyn Alexander (75)	Black	Shreveport, Louisiana	A woman was hit by a SPD cruiser which was responding to a call for service.
2026-02-03	Michael J. Johnson (27)	Black	Reno, Nevada	Reno Police were called for a welfare check and encountered Johnson, who was homeless. Officers shot him when him lunged toward them and produced a large metal tow-style chain from his jacket pocket. An officer was struck by friendly fire. Police released the footage.
2026-02-03	Quinton Baker	White	Las Vegas, Nevada	Metro Police responded to a residence regarding a domestic dispute. Upon arrival, officers encountered Baker, who was holding his son 3-year-old Kentre Baker hostage. He would then approached the officers with the hostage before officers shot him. Simultaneously, Baker, while pointing his firearm in the direction of the juvenile, opened fire, fatally striking his son. Both Baker and his son died in the incident. The footage was released.
2026-02-03	Patrick Madison (35)	Unknown	Spencer, Massachusetts	A man was killed by a Millbury police officer after wounding him in a Family Dollar shootout at the Big Y Shopping Plaza in Spencer. Police reported that the officer spotted the man after confirming his identity, but fled to the Family Dollar before the shootout.
2026-02-02	Thomas Bush (72)	Unknown	Atlanta, Georgia	MARTA Police Officer Deion Alexander, who was responding to a call for assistance with lights and sirens on, collided with another car at an intersection, several people were injured and a pedestrian died from their injuries. Alexander was fired and he turned himself in to the Fulton County Jail. He was charged with vehicular homicide.
2026-02-01	Jermaine Cole (41)	Black	Jackson, Tennessee	Jackson officers responded to a call regarding a man armed with a gun before shooting and killing him upon arrival.
2026-02-01	unidentified male (60s)	Unknown	St. Louis, Missouri	St. Louis County Police chased a man in a mid-2000s Dodge Ram who was wanted in connection with shots fired in their jurisdiction, the man exited his vehicle at a railroad crossing that was activated for an oncoming train in the Near North End area, then pulled his firearm before being shot and killed by officers.
2026-02-01	David Works (62)	White	Independence, Kentucky	Police responded to the call from Works, who was threatening self-harm. Officers shot and killed Works after he exited the residence with a firearm.

== See also ==
- Death in custody § United States
- Henry A. Wallace Police Crime Public Database
- List of cases of police brutality
- List of countries with annual rates and counts for killings by law enforcement officers
- List of law enforcement officers killed in the line of duty in the United States
- List of law enforcement officers convicted for an on-duty killing in the United States
- List of shootings by US immigration agents
- List of police reforms related to the George Floyd protests
- List of unarmed African Americans killed by law enforcement officers in the United States
- Lists of killings by law enforcement officers
- Police brutality in the United States
- Police misconduct § United States
- Police riot § United States
- Police use of deadly force in the United States
