= Albuquerque Police Department =

Municipal police in New Mexico, U.S.

- Patch
- Abbreviation: APD
- Motto: "In step with our community"

Agency overview
- Formed: 1880
- Annual budget: $281 million (2025)
- Legal personality: Governmental: Government agency

Jurisdictional structure
- Operations jurisdiction: Albuquerque, New Mexico, U.S.
- Map showing jurisdictional area
- Area: 181.3 sq mi (469.5 km^{2})
- Population: 560,234 (2018)
- Legal jurisdiction: As per operations jurisdiction
- General nature: Civilian police

Operational structure
- Police officers: ▼885 of 1,000 (2024)
- Agency executive: Cecily A. Barker, Chief of Police
- Bureaus: 5: Field Services Bureau; Administrative Support Bureau; Support Services Bureau; Investigative Bureau; Compliance Bureau

Facilities
- Area commands: 6: Northwest; Southwest; Valley; Southeast; Northeast; Foothills
- Helicopters: 2 – Air 1 Air 2 Eurocopter EC120
- Plane / fixed wings: 1 – Air 5 (Cessna 182)

Website
- www.cabq.gov/police

The Albuquerque Police Department (APD) is the municipal law enforcement agency of Albuquerque, New Mexico. It is the largest police force in the state, with approximately 1,000 sworn officers in 2022.

In addition to serving as the primary police force of Albuquerque, APD officers are sworn in as special deputy sheriffs by the Bernalillo County Sheriff's Office, which grants jurisdiction over Bernalillo County.

APD has a history of police brutality and misconduct, and between 2010 and 2016 reportedly had the highest rate of police-involved fatal shootings in the United States. Since 2014, an ongoing consent decree with the U.S. Department of Justice has resulted in significant but incomplete progress in training and the reduction excessive use of force.

== History ==
=== Founding ===
Starting in 1881, the unincorporated town of Albuquerque was patrolled by a succession of marshals, aided by volunteer watchmen. (Note: Albuquerque's first Marshall, Milton J. Yarberry, was hanged for murder.) The city's first police chief, J.R. Galusha, was appointed in 1916.

=== Twentieth century ===
The Albuquerque Police Department underwent significant changes under Chief Paul Shaver (1948–1971) who remains the city's longest-serving police chief. During his tenure, Albuquerque's population more than doubled from 96,000 to 250,000 residents, resulting in Albuquerque Police Department growing from 30 police officers to 380. Chief Shaver administration saw the establishment of a permanent police academy and range, and the creation of the Records Unit and Juvenile Division; police communications, patrol strategies, and investigative procedures were likewise professionalized and modernized.

After Shaver's retirement, the city was rocked by rioting following the arrest of several students by police for public intoxication. The ensuing three-day melee was brought under control only after the deployment of the New Mexico National Guard. Thirteen civilians were shot during the disorder, some by police officers and some by private citizens repelling the sporadic looting that accompanied the unrest.

In 1973, the Chicano Police Officers' Association of Albuquerque and twelve Albuquerque police officers led by Refugio Beserra sued the city in federal court, alleging that Hispanic-surnamed applicants were discriminated against in hiring and promotion practices of the police department. The lawsuit survived adverse testimony and several motions to dismiss and even went up to the Supreme Court of the United States before being scheduled for trial in March 1978. On May 15, 1978, the parties agreed to a stipulated judgment that required the city to pay $8,000 to Beserra and $8,000 to the Chicano Police Officers' Association, meet an affirmative action goal of 34% Hispanic-surnamed people in the police department by July 1, 1981, and complete an affirmative action internal audit of the police department to verifiably validate the testing procedures for promotion. APD was also to assign a Chicano police officer to the police academy; and expand department language and cultural awareness training. After the settlement was approved, the lawyers for the Chicano Police Officers' Association requested more money from the city for attorney's fees, and over the dissent of Chief Judge Seth, the U.S. Tenth Circuit Court ordered them to be paid. Despite the settlement, complaints continued even into the 1990s. However, the 34% target had been exceeded by 1993 with a 39.4% Hispanic-surnamed force.

In 1976, Albuquerque police coordinated with the Federal Bureau of Investigation in Operation Fiesta. The year-long series of undercover investigations and stings, funded by the Law Enforcement Assistance Administration, targeted the fencing operations then prolific in the Albuquerque area, resulting in 79 arrests.

=== Twenty-first century ===
Albuquerque's police department faced mounting public controversy due to increasing violent encounters between police and residents, including a series of high-profile police-involved shootings that attracted statewide and often national attention. This was exacerbated by reports that the police union had been routinely providing cash payments to officers involved in shootings to help them recover emotionally from the event.

In an incident that attracted nationwide attention, on April 12, 2011, two APD police officers in civilian clothing hopped a fence into the backyard of Christopher Torres, who had schizophrenia, in an attempt to serve a warrant. One of the officers, Christopher J. Brown, shot Torres to death following an altercation; a witness testified that the plainclothes officers appeared to be robbers. Stephen Torres, the victim's father, won a wrongful death lawsuit against APD.

By the end of 2012, APD officers had been involved in 25 shootings, of which 17 resulted in at least one fatality. In November 2012, a union-sponsored survey of Albuquerque police officers found that all but three of 456 respondents characterized morale as "low", with 18% saying the U.S. Department of Justice (DOJ) should be asked to initiate an inquiry into the department. Faced with declining morale, as well as pay cuts imposed by the city for budgetary purposes, between 2010 and 2013, the number of police employed by the city of Albuquerque plummeted by more than 15% due to officer resignations.

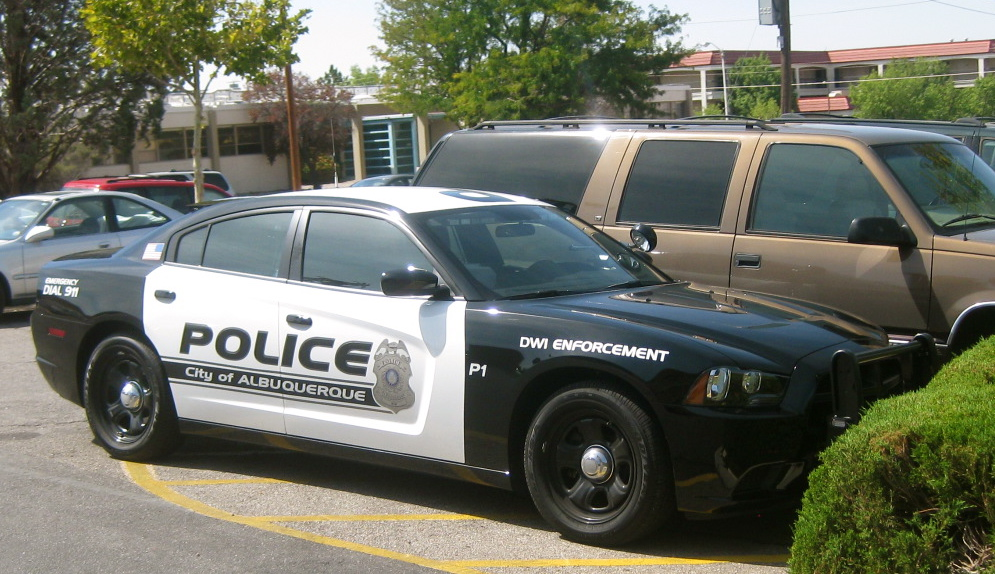
An Albuquerque DUI unit police car in 2012

==== Department of Justice investigation (2012-2014) ====
In response to the spate of police-involved shootings that began in 2010, on November 27, 2012, the DOJ launched an investigation into APD's policies and practices to determine whether the department engaged in a pattern or practice of using excessive force in violation of the Fourth Amendment and the Violent Crime Control and Law Enforcement Act of 1994. As part of its investigation, the DOJ consulted with police practices experts and conducted a comprehensive assessment of officers' use of force and APD policies and operations. The investigation included tours of APD facilities and area commands; interviews with Albuquerque officials, APD command staff, supervisors, and police officers; a review of numerous documents; and meetings with the Albuquerque Police Officers Association, residents, community groups, and other stakeholders.

Amid the investigation, Albuquerque's KOAT-TV conducted a survey finding that 42% of city residents trusted police, 22% distrusted them, and the remainder "fell somewhere in the middle". City council member Rey Garduño characterized these results as "not good"; Mayor Richard J. Berry said he continued to "stand behind" the police department. In February 2014, Chief Ray Schultz stepped down due to ongoing controversy; he was replaced by Gorden Eden. The following month, approximately 300 Albuquerque residents protested against police in a tumultuous demonstration that ended with tear gas being deployed amid scattered clashes between police and protesters. Mayor Berry stated the protest was sidelined by a small group within the larger demonstration that was determined to create havoc. A counter-protest the following week drew a crowd of several hundred in support of the police.

On March 16, 2014, several Albuquerque police officers were involved in the shooting death of James Boyd, a mentally ill homeless man who was illegally camping on the Sandia Mountains foothills. Following a five-hour standoff, Boyd, who was carrying two camping knives in his hands, was shot three times, in the back and both arms, from at least ten feet away with a semi-automatic rifle. Officers also fired a Taser shotgun, beanbag shotgun, and flashbang grenade. Footage captured on body mounted cameras shows one officer unleashing his K-9 German shepherd against Boyd as he lay on the ground wheezing. Boyd later died at UNM Hospital. The incident drew national attention to Albuquerque's struggles with police-related violence; protests erupted against the excessive use of force, and the Federal Bureau of Investigation opened an investigation. Boyd's brother filed a wrongful death suit against the city, which was settled in July 2015 for $5 million.

Within a month of the Boyd shooting, the DOJ released its report, concluded that the Albuquerque Police Department had a "culture of acceptance of the use of excessive force", frequently not justified by the circumstances, which undervalued civilian safety, discounted the importance of crisis intervention, and caused significant harm or injury to people who posed no threat; the report also found that APD engaged "in a pattern or practice of violating residents' Fourth Amendment rights" and of using deadly force "in an unconstitutional manner". The DOJ called for an extensive series of reforms, including a nearly complete overhaul of the department's use-of-force policies. Following the report, the city and the DOJ negotiated a court-enforceable consent decree which set forth 106 pages of provisions, including the dismantling of the Repeat Offender Project and the reining in of the SWAT team, which had operated outside the command structure for years.

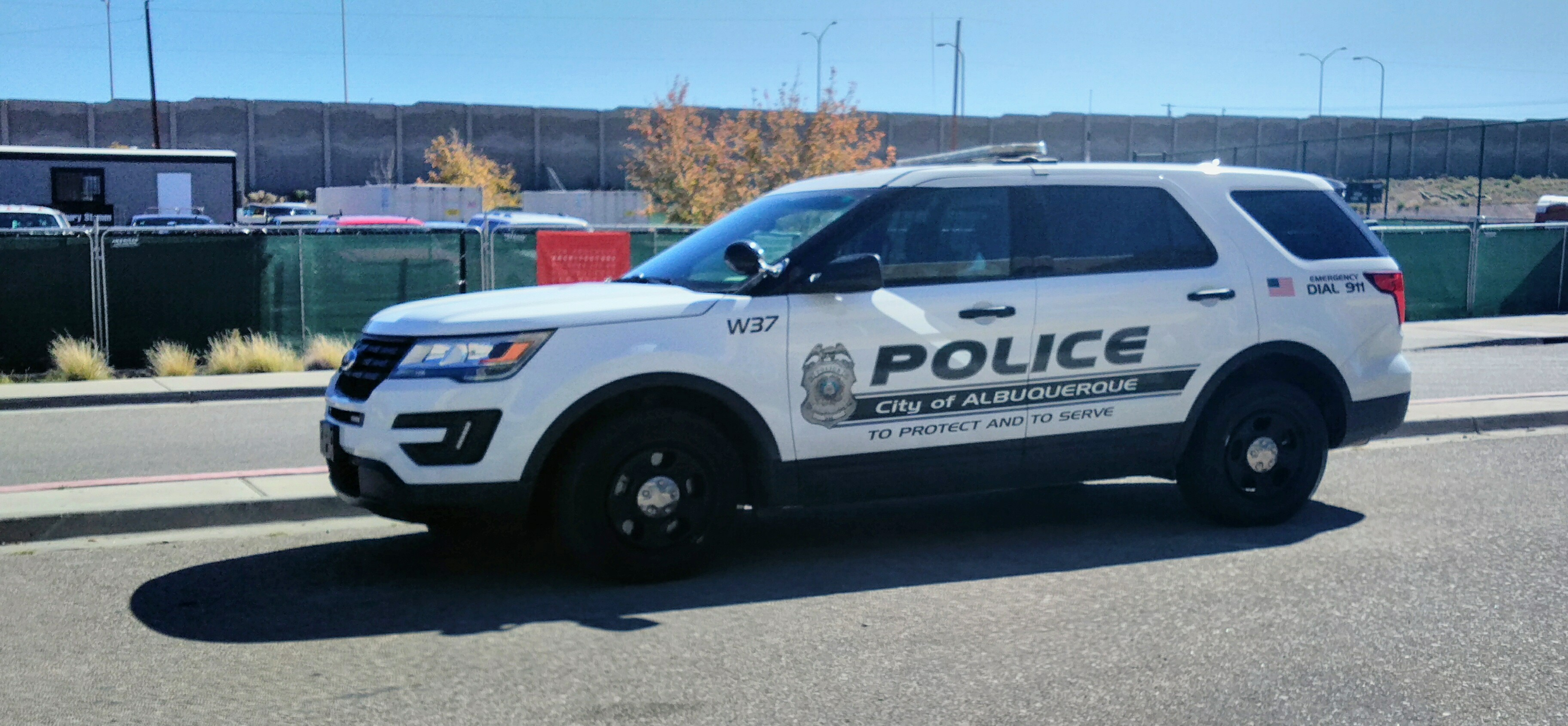
A Ford Police Utility in 2017

On May 3, 2014, police shot and killed Armand Martin following a six-hour standoff between police and Martin, whose wife had called 911 after he allegedly stated an intention to kill his children. According to police, officers opened fire after Martin exited his home shooting wildly at nearby houses with two handguns. Two days later, in response to the shooting, several dozen protesters—led by activists Andres Valdez and David Correia—descended on Albuquerque city council chambers, presenting a self-styled "arrest warrant" for Chief Eden and forcing the premature adjournment of the council meeting. Valdez subsequently declared that he and protesters had successfully deposed the city government in a coup d'état, although the council reconvened normally two days later. Correia, a University of New Mexico professor, stated that the attempted "citizen's arrest" of officials was inspired by the 1967 Reies Tijerina courthouse raid, in which protesters supporting land redistribution stormed a courthouse, gunned down police who attempted to resist the takeover, and took the sheriff and a journalist hostage.

==== Recent developments ====
On January 12, 2015, two Albuquerque PD officers involved in the death of James Boyd, Keith Sandy and Dominique Perez, were charged with open counts of murder, marking the first time since 1977 that city police officers involved in a deadly shooting were prosecuted.

An April 2016 investigation by Al Jazeera, which included interviews with former officers, local lawyers, and journalists, found that reforms initiated under the consent decree had only "scratch[ed] the surface" of APD's "corrupt and violent culture", which had allegedly "continued unabated". The investigators described the city's police department as the most violent in the country, with the highest rate of fatal shootings by officers in the United States, eight times that of the police in New York City, and nearly double that of Chicago police.

In October 2016, Albuquerque's Civilian Police Oversight Agency (CPOA) reported receiving 125 police complaints and 93 "job well done" responses by residents in the first half of the year. After investigating allegations of police officers violating APD policy, CPOA found that the police chief disagreed with its findings or disciplinary recommendations in about 7 percent of cases, albeit without explanation. The following month, the independent monitor enlisted to oversee implementation of the consent decree, Dr. James Ginger, raised doubts about APD's commitment to reform, questioning whether the department was taking into account prior reports and recommendations. Dr. Giner's review determined that APD lacked "tight, executive-level command and control" that could effectively implement reforms. Amid resistance to the ongoing consent decree, in April 2021, the Albuquerque Police Officers' Association, the local police union, launched a billboard campaign against "endless DOJ oversight"; Dr. Ginger challenged the union's claim that rising crime was related to the decree and claimed the court-approved settlement could be completed in two to three years if the city continued implementing reforms.

Despite sustained opposition to the federally mandated reforms, as well as continued issues with the department, police shootings have reportedly dropped since the DOJ report was released. As a result of the consent decree, APD officers now receive training on how to minimize the use of force in high stress situations. The SWAT unit, which had been explicitly cited by the DOJ for its abuse of power, was identified as "one of the strongest teams within the department." Officers have used their guns less since the new training was implemented: In 2013, officers used their guns 15 times, resulting in eight deaths or injuries; in 2015, guns were drawn 10 times and five people were killed. Although there were record police shootings in 2022, the trend of fewer fatalities persisted: From 2020 to early November 2022, there were a total of 35 police shootings, of which 18 of were fatal, constituting a fatality rate of 51%; by comparison, there were a total of 25 shootings, and 17 fatalities, from 2010 to early November 2012, a fatality rate of about 68%.

==== Progress and proposed revision of Consent Decree ====
A December 2022 report by the External Force Investigations Team (EFIT), another monitoring body of the settlement agreement, found that APD has made a "dramatic reduction" in the percent of forceful interactions that are "out of policy". In July 2021 almost 10 out of every 100 forceful interactions were out of policy; by the end of September 2022, this had declined by half, to five out of every 100. The EFIT report also found a "noticeable improvement" in APD's Internal Affairs Force Division (IAFD), which undertakes investigations of officer involved shootings. Nevertheless, the EFIT concluded that there remained "concerns" about compliance among first line IAFD supervisors.

In addition to reforms of the police department, in June 2020, Mayor Tim Keller announced the creation of the Albuquerque Community Safety (ACS) Department, an alternative to law enforcement that responds to calls related to nonviolent matters such as intoxication, homelessness, addiction, and mental health. Described as a "huge success" by the Seattle Times, the ACS had a budget of approximately $6 million in 2022 and responded to 16,000 calls, nearly half of which never required policy intervention. The program's budget for 2023 is slated to nearly double in order to add 75 additional responders.

On April 12, 2023, the Justice Department announced that the City of Albuquerque and APD had made "notable progress in implementing the consent decree", and that it would file a joint motion with the city to modify the consent decree accordingly. The announcement noted that the police department had achieved compliance with 80% of the consent decree, including equipping all officers with body cameras, launching a new civilian unit for investigating low-level uses of force, increased crisis intervention training, improved police training, and creating a "Bureau of Police Reform" to further advance reform efforts. The DOJ noted that there remained several areas of improvement, namely regarding officer-involved shootings, response times, and recruitment numbers.

== Rank structure ==
Title	Insignia
Chief of Police	
Deputy Chief of Police	
Chief of Staff	
Commander	
Major	
Deputy Commander	
Lieutenant	
Sergeant	
Police Officer/Detective	No insignia

== Operations and organization ==
As of June 2022, APD reportedly employed roughly 1,000 personnel, out of an approved strength of 1,400. Since 2010, the department has consistently struggled with retention and recruitment; the Albuquerque city budget for 2018 sought to raise officers pay by 2-3% in hopes of retaining experienced officers. The city's planned budget for 2023, which will be a record-breaking $1.4 billion, allocates approximately $225 million (one-third of the total) to APD in order to fill vacancies and stem resignations.

Officers operate out of six area commands. An air unit operates a Eurocopter EC120, and a Cessna 182.

In September 2008 the Bureau of Statistics the U.S. Department of Justice reported that the Albuquerque Police Department was the 49th largest police department in the United States. The crime rate in Albuquerque is 53% higher than the U.S. average, with notably high levels of drunk driving and gun violence.

== In popular culture ==
The Albuquerque Police Department and fictional Albuquerque police officers are portrayed at various times in the television series Breaking Bad and its spin-off prequel Better Call Saul, which are set in a version of the city.

In the late 1990s and early 2000s, the department appeared in several episodes of the television show Cops. However, in 2001 Mayor Martin Chávez refused to allow the program to shoot additional episodes, explaining that "the city's police officers are portrayed in a good light, but the rest of the city looks horrible." A newspaper report on the Cops ban noted a post made to a television enthusiast website commented "How much crime can there be in Albuquerque, New Mexico? They taped so many shows in that town, I'm ready never to visit." In 2014, the mayor's office reiterated its refusal to allow the television show access to the city police.

In Plain Sight (2008–2012) is a series that revolves around officers attached to the Albuquerque, office of the Federal Witness Security Program (WITSEC). One character is an APD detective.

APD came under heavy fire in two articles in early 2015, one in Rolling Stone and one in The New Yorker. Both articles lambasted the Police Department for use of force and lack of accountability in officer-involved shootings. Despite the Albuquerque Police Department paying one of the highest starting salaries in the state and nation, the department is still struggling to obtain above 1,000 officers.

== See also ==
- List of law enforcement agencies in New Mexico
- Alfred Redwine shooting
- Shooting of James Boyd
- Parrish Dennison
- List of Albuquerque police shootings
- Kendall Carroll
- Darren White
- David Correia
