= Killing of Parrish Dennison =

Victim of a police shooting in the U.S. in 2013

Parrish Dennison was shot and killed by police in New Mexico in 2013. There was disagreement over the justification for the fatal shooting.

== Fatal shooting ==
On March 5, 2013, Parrish Dennison was shot and killed by Albuquerque police officers Perdue, Dedler and Aragon. Dennison was suspected of being one of three people attempting to sell a stolen banjo from the robbery of a local music store.

Police alleged that Dennison pointed a revolver at them before they shot him. Dennison's mother, Charlotte Ingraham, asserted that footage from a helicopter camera showed otherwise. Police video from after the shooting showed Dennison on the ground with a gun in his hand. The shooting was ruled as justified by the Bernalillo County District Attorney's Office. After the incident, Dennison’s family filed a lawsuit for wrongful death.

A witness to the incident stated that Dennison did not point a gun at officers before the shooting, and that Dennison tried to break through a window but bounced off before police fired upon him. The witness said, "He never once pointed the gun at them, nothing… He just hit that window and just bounced back and then boom, boom, boom."

== See also ==
- Kendall Carroll
- Shooting of James Boyd
- Alfred Redwine shooting
- List of Albuquerque police shootings
