= List of Albuquerque police shootings =

The police force of Albuquerque, New Mexico has been involved in a number of shooting incidents and has used other forms of force, many of these involving the use of SWAT teams. The city's police department was the subject of a Department of Justice Investigation in 2014 which found that the department "engages in a pattern or practice of use of excessive force, including deadly force, in violation of the Fourth Amendment". The report also stated that the department suffered from "structural and systemic deficiencies-including insufficient oversight, inadequate training, and ineffective policies". As of 2025, New Mexico had the second highest rate per capita of killings by police officers, after Alaska. Additionally, a 2021 study by the Lancet medical journal found that official statistics under-reported Albuquerque police killings from 1980-2018, with approximately 26.4% of deaths having been misclassified.

== Incidents of police shootings ==
=== Pre-2010 ===
Date	Officer name(s)	Civilian name(s)	Outcome	Notes	Officer Outcome
September 22, 2004	Sean Wallace	Leo Lopez	Lopez killed	shot during traffic stop after officer feared vehicle threat during heroin investigation	Acquitted
June 5, 2007	Russell Carter	Jay Martin Murphy	Murphy killed	barricaded self in home; Jay Murphy Jr., 19, tried to calm police down	
November 6, 2009	Brandon Carr	Roderick Jones	Jones killed		Carr fired 18 months later

=== 2010 ===
Date	Officer name(s)	Civilian name(s)	Outcome	Notes	Officer Outcome
January 9, 2010	Andrew Cooke	Aaron Renfro	Renfro killed	passenger in car stopped for speeding	Cooke cleared by grand jury
January 13, 2010	Brett Lampiris-Tremba, Sean Wallace also present	Kenneth Ellis III	Ellis killed	Ellis holding gun to his own head	Judge in civil suit ruled Ellis' rights violated; Brett Lampiris-Tremba sued APD for promotion and back pay; Family awarded $7.95 million settlement
January 29, 2010	Sean Wallace	Wayne Cordova	Cordova killed	Cordova suspected of fleeing after possibly stealing a car	Wallace now a K-9 officer who works with SWAT; Wallace later shot Alan Gomez; the District Attorney ruled this a justifiable homicide
March 4, 2010	Roger Legendre	Jose Castillo, Tanya Martinez, Raymond Carillo	Castillo charged with assaulting a police officer	Police shot at car after beer shoplifting incident, Giant gas station, Coors, and Quail; Castillo driving	Legendre was later promoted to sergeant
March 29, 2010	Kevin Sanchez	Mickey Owings	Owings killed	Sanchez shot at moving vehicle in Walmart parking lot, I-40 and Quail; Pregnant female in Owings vehicle unharmed 40+ witnesses	*The city's independent review officer ruled the shooting was justified The DoJ used this shooting as an example of "Albuquerque police officers' own recklessness" leading to use of violence Wrongful death lawsuit filed
April 14, 2010	Zach Stephenson	Benjamin Marquez	Marquez shot 3-4 times in upper body	Marquez smoking a cigarette while pumping gas at Broadway and Gibson	
June 10, 2010	Eric Brown, Anthony Sedler	Chris Hinz; Northeast Heights near Juan Tabo Boulevard and Spain Avenue	Hinz killed	Hinz intoxicated at home. Police said he was firing his weapon inside his home	Sedler later shoots Parrish Dennison
June 14, 2010	Aaron Zwicky	Julian Calbert	Calbert killed	Calbert had kidnapped two women; One called 911 from Calbert's car trunk	A grand jury found the shooting justified
July 27, 2010	Jeremy Hollier, Anthony Glodon	Len Fuentes, a diagnosed schizophrenic, was reportedly unable to access treatment	Fuentes killed 3400 block Crest SE	domestic violence call	Hollier arrested in 2012 for felony domestic violence, still with APD
August 17, 2010	Josh Brown	Enrique Carrasco	Carrasco shot at Montgomery and San Mateo after slashing his girlfriend's tires	Carrasco jumped on Brown's hood and repeatedly stabbed officer's driver-side window with a knife and broke it, then tried to open the door, said Public Safety Director Darren White	
September 14, 2010	Leah Kelly	Chandler Barr	Barr hospitalized, survived being shot, 2nd and Central	Police called because Barr was cutting his arm with a "butter knife"; Kelly was smoking a cigar as she pulled trigger	Barr filed suit for $340,000 in medical bills and pain and suffering A federal jury found no liability.
October 19, 2010	Drew Bader, Ramon Ornelas	Daniel Gonzales	Tucumcari police asked NM State Police for help, State Police call in Albuquerque SWAT	Gonzales came to door with two rifles	APD SWAT officers cleared
October 31, 2010	David Sprague	Alexei Sinkevitch; 6500 block of Tierra Prieta NW	Sinkevitch had rifle, and bled to death on floor of his home	911 reports of hit-and-runs on Estrella Brillante NW; Callers took plate Police traced to Sinkevitch	
November 11, 2010	Brian Pitzer, Doug Moore	Russell Tenorio; 1400 block Alamo SE	Tenorio survived, in hospital 2½ months, lost a kidney.	Tenorio had fetal alcohol symptom, was threatening to hurt himself	Pitzer announced he was "going lethal" before entering the home, resulted in a federal lawsuit

=== 2011 ===
Date	Officer name(s)	Civilian name(s)	Outcome	Notes	Officer Outcome
February 9, 2011	Byron "Trey" Economidy (Detective)	Jacob Mitschelen	Mitschelen killed	traffic stop	wrongful death lawsuit settled for $300,000
April 12, 2011	Christopher J. Brown	Christopher Torres	Torres shot in his parents' back yard	father says police used a battering ram to enter the house even though he was present and offered to let them in	Jury award over $10 million, later settled for $6 million
May 10, 2011	Sean Wallace	Alan Gomez	Gomez killed while holding spoon. Wrongful death suit settled in December 2013 for $900,000	"the officer shot Gomez without verifying a threat, and after receiving information that Gomez could not have been a threat because he was no longer armed."	Earlier wrongful death suit settled for $235,000. Wallace first shot a civilian on September 22, 2004, in Chimayó when he was an NMSP narcotics agent; tort claim notice filed late December 2004; Shot and killed second civilian January 29, 2010.
June 4, 2011	Troy Nikko, William Thomas, Michael Oates	Raymond Garcia	Garcia killed Lomas and Palomas	Garcia caught carjacking, officers pinned his car in near a chainlink fence in front of Cross Country Auto Sales	
June 26, 2011	Damian Lujan	Orlando Paisano	Paisano tased, shot eight times, Bell and Dallas SE	Paisano holding bayonet, police say	
August 30, 2011	Jim Perdue	Michael Marquez	Marquez shot in field, 60th and Central	Michael Marquez an armed robbery suspect	District Attorney ruled shooting justified; First shooting under new system

=== 2012 ===
Date	Officer name(s)	Civilian name(s)	Outcome	Notes	Officer Outcome
January 4, 2012	Mario Perez	Mark Macoldowna, James Kellogg, Kymberly Bates	Macoldowna killed, Bates and Kellogg arrested	armed robbery of St. Pius X complex	
March 19, 2012	Martin Smith	Daniel Tillison; Marquette and Texas	Tillison killed	wrongful death lawsuit alleges Smith was diagnosed with PTSD and APD knew of it	DA found no probable cause for charges
March 21, 2012	Russ Carter	Gary Atencio	Atencio shot on Laguna Pueblo after pursuit	Carter's 3rd shooting	wrongful death lawsuit dismissed
April 19, 2012	Mike Hill	Dennis Aragon	Aragon shot three times but was expected to survive	police say Aragon fired shots in the air then pointed rifle at police	
August 6, 2012	Jason Peck (APD sgt)	Dominick Solis-Mora	Solis-Mora shot in stomach then recovered	Solis-Mora said to sell $240 worth of meth to undercover Peck	DA and APD Internal Affairs clear Peck of wrongdoing Solis-Mara subsequently involved a number of other criminal incidents

=== 2013 ===
Date	Officer name(s)	Civilian name(s)	Outcome	Notes	Officer Outcome
March 5, 2013	Perdue, Sedler and Aragon	Parrish Dennison	Dennison killed Menaul and Louisiana	Dennison driver of woman trying to sell stolen banjo	Sedler had previously shot Chris Hinz; Sedler cleared of wrongdoing
March 19, 2013	APD	Kendall Caroll; 13000 block Constitution	killed by State Police, APD also fired	Carroll had previously shot and wounded a police officer	
July 5, 2013	Jeff Bludworth, Katherine Wright	Vincent Wood	convenience store Montgomery and San Mateo	previously transported to mental health facility	Shooting ruled justified Wrongful death lawsuit settled for $55,000
October 26, 2013	Officer Luke McPeek and others	Christopher Chase	Chase killed	Chase had "cop killer" tattooed on his knuckles	award ceremony
October 28, 2013	Brian Pitzer	Joaquin Ortega shot Jefferson and Central	Ortega hospitalized then jailed on charges of robbery and carjacking		Prosecutors found no probable cause to charge Pitzer; Pitzer involved in two prior shootings, neither fatal
November 15, 2013	Peter Romero	Robert Garcia Sr.	Garcia shot but survived, received 3-year sentence Traffic stop, San Mateo; Carlisle	Garcia had rifle, had been drinking Later admitted he was attempting suicide by cop	Garcia apologized to Romero
December 1, 2013	Luke McPeek, David Munoz and Jim Edison	Shane Sherrill	Sherrill had felony warrants, holding brake pad	No charges filed against police	
December 8, 2013	Hector Marquez, Nathan Cadroy-Croteau	Andy Snider	Snider killed	Snider said to charge officers with hammer	Wrongful death lawsuit filed 2015; Both officers still on active duty

=== 2014 ===
Date	Officer name(s)	Civilian name(s)	Outcome	Notes	Officer Outcome
January 9, 2014	Russell Carter (Detective, Sedler and Ornelas also present	Jeremy Robertson's tires, Walgreens in Rio Rancho	Robertson uninjured Robertson charged with fleeing, assaulting officer/	Robertson wanted for parole violations	Both Sedler and Ornelas on SWAT team Sedler's 2nd shooting, Ornelas' 3rd
March 16, 2014	Keith Sandy (Detective), Officer Dominique Perez	James Boyd	Boyd killed	camping without a permit displaying knife to officers who tried to frisk him	Both charged with open count of murder. Boyd's family awarded $5 million settlement.
March 25, 2014	James Eichel	Alfred Redwine	Redwine killed	Redwine was upset because he had just lost custody of his 5-year-old son	
April 21, 2014	Jeremy Dear	Mary Hawkes	Hawkes killed	Hawkes suspected of having been in a stolen car. Car's owner later told police Hawkes had dated his room-mate	Police claim 5 body cameras malfunctioned; Dear fired for repeatedly not turning on his camera, particularly in use of force incidents.; Dear appeals firing and is reinstated. City appeals his reinstatement.; Family files wrongful death lawsuit.
May 3, 2014	Daniel Hughes	Armand Martin	Martin killed in his Ventana Ranch home	Martin suffered from depression, "just went crazy," wife said. Martin ran out of his home while discharging his handgun.	DA and APD Internal Affairs clear Hughes of wrongdoing
May 22, 2014	Ryan Graves, Brian Fuchs	Ralph Chavez	Chavez killed, 2nd at I-40	Chavez suspected of rape; Fuch's camera not on; Graves' blocked by uniform, but did record audio; Chavez said to pull knife, advance on officers	DA declined to press charges

=== 2015 ===
Date	Officer name(s)	Civilian name(s)	Outcome	Notes	Officer Outcome
January 9, 2015	Greg Brachle	Jacob Grant (APD detective)	Friendly fire incident, Jacob was working undercover and the other cops thought that he was a criminal. The criminal complaint describes a meth purchase. Charges were filed against Damian Bailey and Edmond Vester for trafficking cocaine, and conspiracy to commit trafficking	Officer Brachle's 2nd shooting Grant will need medical for the rest of his life, settled lawsuit for $6.5 million and medical expenses	police oversight board recommended firing but Brachle had already retired "APD said since that shooting, the department has improved supervision, training and equipment for undercover officers. In addition, it is now mandatory to attend all briefings before each operation.

=== 2016 ===
Date	Officer name(s)	Civilian name(s)	Outcome	Notes	Officer Outcome
May 29, 2016	unknown	Dennis Humphrey	Humphrey shot in his garage Morningside and Goodrich	911 call reported he was drunk and walking around outside his house with a rifle	

=== 2018 ===
In 2018, there were 10 officer-involved shootings in Albuquerque, 7 of which were fatal.

=== 2019 ===
In 2019, there were 8 officer-involved shootings in Albuquerque, 4 of which were fatal.

Date	Officer name(s)	Civilian name(s)	Outcome	Notes	Officer Outcome
July 3, 2019	One Albuquerque detective	Unidentified man	Unidentified man killed in apparent shootout with detective		
August 22, 2019	Paul Durham, Kyle King and Randy Serrano, accompanied by two other officers	Roger Schafer	Schafer shot at a bus stop at Eubank and Copper NE	"Multiple 911 calls" reported Schafer was tossing a gun from hand to hand, "pulling the action back" and pointing the gun at traffic. It was a BB gun.	
October 14, 2019	APD and SWAT	Daniel James Wood	Wood killed		
October 25, 2019	At least three officers	Unidentified man	Unidentified man killed after confronted by officers accusing him of attempted carjacking		

=== 2020 ===
In 2020, there were 10 officer-involved shootings in Albuquerque, 6 of which were fatal.

Date	Officer name(s)	Civilian name(s)	Outcome	Notes	Officer Outcome
January 6, 2020	Two Albuquerque detectives	Orlando Abeyta	Abeyta killed		
March 30, 2020	Joseph Bush, Edgar Sandoval	Valente Acosta-Bustillos	Acosa-Bustillos killed		
August 11, 2020	Unknown APD officers	Ken Reiss	Reiss killed	Reiss had called 911 to report multiple people breaking into his house. When police arrived, they saw a man running in the alleyway. They say he shot at them. They fired multiple times according to neighbors. As Reiss lay screaming they shot four more times according to neighbors, then the screaming stopped. According to body camera footage released by the police, Reiss was indeed holding a gun but the footage does not show him shooting at the police. -second police shooting resulting in death in less than 6 hours	

=== 2021 ===
In 2021, there were 9 officer-involved shootings in Albuquerque, 3 of which were fatal.

Date	Officer name(s)	Civilian name(s)	Outcome	Notes	Officer Outcome
July 5, 2021	Curtis Hoffman, Nathaniel Matheson	Dalton Cunningham	Cunningham injured		
July 31, 2021	Unidentified officer	Robert Savelli	Savelli killed	Officer pulled Savelli over because he did not have a license plate on his moped-style scooter.	
August 15, 2021	Max Denerstein, Christopher Mings	Eric Padilla	Padilla killed.		
August 19, 2021	Mario Verbeck, James Eichel, Harry Gunderson, Sean Kenny	James Ramirez	4 officers and Ramirez injured.		Officers received awards for their actions.
August 20, 2021	Josh Richards, L. McPeek	David Martinez	Martinez critically injured	Richards involved in one prior shooting; McPeek involved in two prior shootings.	

=== 2022 ===
In 2022, there were a record number of 18 officer-involved shootings in Albuquerque.

Date	Officer name(s)	Civilian name(s)	Outcome	Notes	Officer Outcome
February 25, 2022	Unidentified APD detectives	Raphael Marquez	Marquez killed		
March 14, 2022	At least 2 unidentified APD officers	Unidentified man	Subject killed; 2 officers injured; 1 bystander killed and 2 bystanders injured by subject		
March 14, 2022	Randy Serrano, Derek Taylor, Greg Doose	John Dawson Hunter	Hunter killed; 1 bystander injured by Hunter	Hunter was shooting at cars on the road from his home prior to incident. Officers discharged a total of 12 rounds at Hunter. Serrano involved in one prior shooting.	
March 19, 2022	William Young, Jonathan Mares	Collin Neztsosie	Neztsosie killed	Neztsosie stated that he intended to shoot passersby in cars, and then himself.	
March 29, 2022	Justin Collins, Andrew Herpolsheimer	Donovan Bookout	No injuries		
April 12, 2022	Damian Lujan, Jerry Arnold	Shannon Candelario	Candelario injured	Lujan involved in three prior shootings.	
June 19, 2022	Tristan Garcia	Frank Baty	Baty killed	Baty had an airsoft gun in his truck.	Put on temporary administrative leave.
July 5, 2022	Matthew Silva	James Kevin Langlois	Langlois dead of apparent self-inflicted gunshot wound.	None of Silva's shots hit Langlois.	
July 21, 2022	Robert Sanchez	Wendel Bryan Tagle	Wendel killed	Wendel involved in a DV incident prior to officers' arrival. Sanchez involved in another OIS in 2018.	
August 22, 2022	Harold Sennett	Unidentified man	No injuries	Subject shot and killed a woman as officers arrived.	
August 28, 2022	Dustin Ketchum, Marcos Flores, Kenneth Skeens	Keshawn Thomas	Thomas killed	Thomas had been sleeping in his vehicle which was parked at a gas station. A passer-by called for a welfare check, as the vehicle had not moved for several hours. APD officers made contact with Thomas, the sole occupant of the vehicle. They questioned Thomas, who was intoxicated, outside of his vehicle. During questioning Thomas mentioned to them he had a firearm in the vehicle. They allowed him to return to his vehicle in order to retrieve his cellphone. Officers claim that he then pointed a firearm at them, causing them to open fire on Thomas. Thomas was transported to a local trauma center where he later died.	The officers involved received verbal and written reprimands, Skeens was fired due to a matter unrelated to this case. Lawsuit settlement was later granted to Thomas' family in March 2025. Retrial against Skeens related to wrongful arrest of Matthew McManus gets underway starting April 1, 2025.
September 21, 2022	Quan La	Gabriel Garcia	Garcia injured		
September 27, 2022	Adam Portillos, Benjamin Daffron	Oron Newson	Newson injured		
October 6, 2022	Unidentified detective	Daniel Rodriguez	No injuries		
November 5, 2022	Nicholas Steward	Julian Sanchez	Sanchez killed	Steward believed that Sanchez had fired his gun, but an investigation found that Sanchez's gun was not fired.	
November 10, 2022	Five officers, including Chance Gore and Alex Couch	Jesús "Jessie" Crosby	Crosby killed	Five officers approached Crosby, who was diagnosed with schizophrenia and experiencing a crisis. The officers intended to arrest Crosby for trespassing. when Crosby would not surrender, two officers opened fire at Crosby and two shot him with Tasers.	Crosby's family received a $6.5 million settlement.
November 25, 2022	Arniel Sampang, Christopher Taddoni, Jacob Muñoz	Blaine Denetdele	Denetdele killed		

=== 2023 ===
Date	Officer name(s)	Civilian name(s)	Outcome	Notes	Officer Outcome
March 29, 2023	Anthony Guerrera, Ralph Rodriguez, Garrett Maxson, Eduardo Munoz, Angel Ortiz-Arviso	Francisco Macias			
May 10, 2023	Alex Castellano, Francisco Hernandez	Kevin Trujillo	Trujillo injured	Hernandez involved in one prior shooting.	
May 16, 2023	Unidentified Investigative Support detective	Isaac Reyes	Reyes injured	Detective involved in two prior shootings.	
May 19, 2023	Richard Lakey, Steven Raschke	David Gaylor	Gaylor killed		
June 24, 2023	Gianfranco Di Paolo, Brandon Perez, Anthony Trujillo, Damian Dudnow	Mark Peter	Peter killed		
June 29, 2023	Brenda Johnson, Eric Wilensky, Violeta Baca, Christian Cordova	Jeramiah Salyards	Salyards killed; 2 bystanders injured by police gunfire	Salyards was wanted as a suspect in a stabbing incident earlier that evening. Cordova was involved in a prior OIS.	
July 20, 2023	Zachary Herbst	Emmanuel Galaviz Campos	Galaviz killed; 1 officer injured		
August 17, 2023	Garrett Howington	Pablo Abreu-Peña	Abreu-Peña injured and escaped; captured 2 days later.		
November 16, 2023	Jason Allred, Beau Wright-Brown, Daniel Yurcisim, Adrian Miranda	Efren Ramirez	Ramirez injured	Officers shot Ramirez 8 times.	
November 21, 2023	Zachary Earles	Pablo Pacheco	Pacheco injured		
November 25, 2023	Angelo Lovato	Pete Martinez	Martinez killed	Officer was involved in one prior shooting.	
December 8, 2023	Justin Jones, Raymond Marquez, Phillp Meier	Mark Colson	Colson killed	Officers pursued Colson after identifying him as a suspect in recent armed robberies. Colson fled on foot from officers while holding a handgun, and officers shot and killed him.	
December 30, 2023	APD Officers Zachary Garris, Isaiah Relaford, and Howard Perry	Santiago Perez	Perez and Garris injured.	Officers were looking for a vehicle that was reported stolen, and found Perez with the vehicle. When confronted, Perez allegedly fired two shots at officers, hitting Garris' hands. Relaford and Perry returned fire at Perez, with Perry striking Perez in the arm and leg.	

=== 2024 ===
In 2024, there were 13 officer-involved shootings in Albuquerque.

Date	Officer name(s)	Civilian name(s)	Outcome	Notes	Officer Outcome
January 25, 2024	Tristan Garcia	Joseph Baca	Baca killed	Baca was allegedly pointing a gun at bystanders. Baca's gun was later found to be unloaded. Garcia was involved in a prior shooting in 2022.	Placed on leave and then reinstated.
February 1, 2024	2 unidentified APD officers	Unidentified man	Unidentified man dead	The unidentified man was experiencing a mental health crisis. Two officers opened fire, but the man may have died from a self-incflicted gunshot wound.	Officers placed on administrative leave.
March 6, 2024	2 unidentified New Mexico State Police officers	Francisco Hernandez	Hernandez killed.	Hernandez was involved in an altercation with Sandia PD a few days before. He attempted to flee from officers and drew a gun, and two officers shot and killed him.	Officers placed on administrative leave.
March 17, 2024	Unidentified BSCO and/or NMSP officer(s)	Jaremy Smith	Smith injured	Smith was wanted for killing a NMSP officer 2 days beforehand.	
March 17, 2024	Unknown Bernalillo County Sheriff officers	Two unidentified men	No injuries	Officers fired at least one shot at two men in a "suspicious" car.	
March 19, 2024	David Nix	Mariah Voigt	Voigt killed	Officers allegedly mistook Voigt's cellphone for a gun.	Placed on leave and then reinstated.
March 30, 2024	Nathien Apodaca, Hernan Conchas	Alijah Archuleta	Archuleta injured	Officers responded to a call about a domestic dispute from Archuleta's girlfriend's mother. Officers saw Archuleta with a gun and shot multiple times at his fleeing vehicle. Suspects apprehended Archuleta after he fled on foot.	
April 11, 2024	2 unidentified APD officers	Mark Benavidez	Benavidez killed	Benavidez's girlfriend was wanted for armed robbery. When APD arrested her, Benavidez took an officer's gun and fired at officers. two officers shot Benavidez 5 times. The officers were later found to have used racial slurs and language glorifying violence after the incident.	
April 30, 2024	Unidentified officer(s)	Nicolas Roach	Roach injured		
June 20, 2024	Unknown APD officer(s)	Dale Meador	Meador killed	Meador and an unidentified woman had warrants out for their arrest, and were stopped for driving a stolen car. Meador threatened the woman with a gun, officers administered less lethal munitions, and then one officer shot Meador and killed him.	
August 17, 2024	Truitt Bushnell, Robert Sanchez	Derek Pickett	Pickett killed.	Sanchez, who was involved in 2 prior fatal shootings, fired the fatal shot at Pickett.	
October 13, 2024	Jeff Schwarzel, Reanna Torres, Vanesa Zuniga	Matthew Sanchez	Sanchez killed; Schwarzel injured by friendly fire	Sanchez drew a gun, that was later found to be unloaded, in a confrontation with officers. Officers fired eight bullets at Sanchez, killing him and injuring Schwarzel.	All three officers placed on leave.
October 18, 2024	Precious Cadena, Zachary Earles	Matthew "Solo" Garcia	Garcia killed.	Garcia killed while handcuffed in the back of a police car.	Officers' conduct ruled in violation of policy. The officers involved were placed on leave until cleared by a mental health professional. Garcia's family sued the city of Albuquerque.
November 11, 2024	Zachary Herbst, Miguel Rodriguez, Derek Maines	Anthony Hernandez	Hernandez killed; 3 bystanders injured.	Hernandez was pointing a gun at a child. Officers told him to drop the gun, but he fired at them. It is unclear whose bullets injured the bystanders. Herbst was involved in 2 prior shootings.	

=== 2025 ===
In 2025, there were 15 officer-involved shootings in Albuquerque, 12 of which were fatal.

Date	Officer name(s)	Civilian name(s)	Outcome	Notes	Officer Outcome
January 24, 2025	Brandon Watts	Anthony James Williams	Williams killed; Watts and one bystander injured	Officers had questioned Williams the previous night for scaring his neighbors; they responded to a call about a break-in, and Williams threatened them. Williams and Watts exchanged gunfire and Watts died on the scene.	
January 30, 2025	Unknown APD officers	Matthias Wynkoop	Wynkoop dead of self-inflicted gunshot wound.	Police responded to Wynkoop's 911 call reporting suicidal thoughts. Crisis counselors were able to speak with Wynkoop, but he eventually pointed his weapon at officers and was shot at several times. Wynkoop got back into his vehicle and shot himself.	
February 23, 2025	Unknown APD officers	Benjamin Raymond	Raymond killed.	Police responded to a domestic violence call from Raymond's wife. Raymond, a member of the Aryan Brotherhood, attempted to flee from police and was tackled. Raymond threatened to shoot the officers, and they fired at least 9 shots at him.	
February 28, 2025	Jonathan Barela and Amanda Marquez	David McElvain	McElvain killed	Officers entered McElvain's home without permission while doing a wellness check on McElvain, who was suicidal. McElvain emerged, holding a gun, and Officer Barela shot him 3 times. McElvain's gun was later found to be unloaded.	A representative of McElvain's estate sued APD for wrongful death in 2026. Both officers are still employed by APD and have not been involved in a shooting since.
March 20, 2025	1 unidentified APD detective	Julian Garcia	Garcia injured	Garcia was wanted in connection with a shooting in 2024 and was charged with murder. Officers used less lethal munitions. the detective who shot Garcia was involved in 5 prior shootings.	
May 29, 2025	Christopher Brito, Joshua Lerma	Jorge Dominguez	Dominguez and police K-9 killed, both by police gunfire.	Dominguez was being pursued for violating parole. Dominguez had a loaded gun, but there was no evidence that it was fired in the altercation.	
June 15, 2025	One unknown APD officer	Gabriel Moralez	Moralez injured	Officers responded to a call about a robbery at a gas station. They used less lethal munitions on Moralez but opened fire after he drew a gun.	Officer remained on-duty.
June 17, 2025	Jonathan Kreamer, Michael Morales, Angel Avalos	Desiree Herrera	Herrera killed	Police responded to a call about Herrera trespassing. Herrera, who was believed to be experiencing a mental health crisis, stole a gun from a security guard and later began firing it into the air. Officers returned fire and killed her when she struck a car near officers.	
July 4, 2025	Dominic Sanchez	Jerry Baldonado	Baldonado injured	Baldonado, an autistic man, pointed an airsoft pellet gun at officers, and Sanchez shot him three times.	
July 15, 2025	Four unknown APD officers, one of whom was involved in a prior shooting, including Matthew Silva.	Sammy Jenkins	Jenkins killed	APD responded to a call from Jenkins' wife, reporting that he was suicidal. Jenkins shot at APD officers from an upstairs bedroom, and they returned fire and killed him.	
August 2, 2025	Two unknown APD officers	Martin Hernandez	Hernandez killed; 1 bystander injured	Officers responded to a domestic violence call in the area. One officer shot a less-lethal round at the suspect. The suspect shot at least 1 bullet at the officers, and one officer shot a lethal round.	Officer who shot lethal round placed on standard administrative leave.
August 19, 2025	Christopher Vaughn	Leilani Tripp	Tripp killed	A woman, who was allegedly holding a knife and had a history of mental illness, was shot by APD officers at an affordable housing complex.	
September 29, 2025	Diego Tena	Brian Womack	Womack killed	Officers responded to Womack's 911 call about a woman trying to enter his apartment. When officers arrived, they heard screaming inside the apartment and entered. They saw Womack hit a woman in the head with a hammer, fired at him, and then attempted to administer first aid, but Womack died on the scene.	
November 3, 2025	Zackary Herbst	Claude Laska	Laska critically injured	Officers responded to a call about Laska abusing his girlfriend and shooting someone in an apartment building. Laska told officers that he would shoot them if they tried to arrest him. Laska fired at least 4 shots at officers, and Herbst shot him once in the neck.	Herbst was involved in 4 shootings prior to this one, one of which was fatal.
December 21, 2025	Officers Michael Golden and Christopher Cooke	Luis Arreola-Palma	Arreola-Palma killed; Officer Golden shot but uninjured.	Police attempted to arrest Arreola-Palma, who had two outstanding warrants. When Arreola-Palma shot at an officer and fled, the officers shot him "roughly 5 or 6 times". The bullet that Arreola-Palma shot struck the officer's radio, which "saved his life".	

=== 2026 ===
So far, there have been 8 shootings by APD in 2026, with 6 resulting in deaths.

Date	Officer name(s)	Civilian name(s)	Outcome	Notes	Officer Outcome
January 10, 2026	Several officers including Brad Hess	James Litteral	Litteral killed.	Officers shot and killed Litteral, who was suspected of robbery, during a foot chase.	
February 3, 2026	APD and SWAT officers including Eric Brown	Roman Kirby	Kirby killed	An officer shot Kirby after a standoff nearly six hours long, in which Kirby pointed his gun at civilians and officers and a crisis negotiator called Kirby nearly 100 times.	
May 24, 2026	Unknown APD officers	Dwayne Wilson	Wilson injured.	Police responded to a domestic violence call by Wilson's girlfriend, who was later able to flee the scene. When police arrived, Wilson was seen with a gun in his waistband. Police fired at Wilson when he allegedly drew the gun, but did not fire.	
May 26, 2026	Officer Tyler Sanchez, David Werner	Jose Manuel Armas	Armas killed; two officers injured with shattered glass.	Armas called APD because he was experiencing suicidal thoughts. Officers allege that Armas fired a gun at them, but Armas' family members state that he had fired it into the air and was unarmed when the police shot him. Armas' family allege that APD made no attempts to deescalate the situation.	
May 29, 2026	Two unknown APD officers.	Robert "Chuco" Salas	Salas killed.	APD responded to a call reporting trespassing. They found Salas, who had allegedly recently cut off his ankle monitor, and who allegedly brandished a large knife at the officers. Officers told Salas to put the knife away, and shot at him 4 times when he ran towards an officer.	
June 2, 2026	Unknown APD officer.	Benjamin Siegling	Siegling injured	Siegling had two felony warrants and was reportedly armed with a knife. An officer opened fire when he stepped towards them with the knife.	APD Chief Cecily Barker stated that APD would move up their officer-involved shooting review, since this was the fourth OIS in 10 days.
July 3, 2026	Officer Preston Harris, Ralph Rodriguez, Jed Jeffries, Diana Magallanes	Stephen Thomas Griego	Griego Killed	Griego was involved in an altercation another man, Juan Ortega. After Ortega shoved Griego, Griego left and retrieved a handgun to shoot Ortega. Officers then ran toward the area, and several shots were fired at the shooter, killing him. A passerby was also struck by gunfire but survived. Ortega also survived the injuries but died days later during an unrelated drug overdose.	
August 11, 2026	Two Unknown APD officers.	Sean Omara	Omara Killed	Officers responded to a residence of a caller who was making false claims earlier. Omara fired at them with over 120 rounds, while wearing a ballistic vest. Two officers shot back.	

== Other use of force incidents ==
Date	Officer name(s)	Civilian name(s)	Outcome	Notes	Officer Outcome
January 1, 2012	Aaron Zwicky	Patrick Dennison; Coors and Central	fatal car crash; Zwicky attempting to respond to shots fired in South Valley	Zwicky previously shot Julian Calbert in 2010	
June 20, 2012	Unknown APD and SWAT	Santiago Chavez	Chavez died of self-inflicted gunshot wound.	Officers responded to a call from neighbors alleging that Chavez was throwing rocks at cars. Chavez barricaded himself inside the house, and SWAT surrounded it. After a 12-hour standoff in which officers deployed teargas and shot at Chavez, SWAT entered the house to see Chavez dead by suicide.	Chavez's family sued APD for excessive use of force in 2015.
February 5, 2015	SWAT	Nicholas Leyba, Moon and Indian School	minor injuries, charged with kidnapping, criminal sexual penetration		
April 7, 2015	SWAT	Dustin Goodwin; 1400 blk Pennsylvania	arrested	domestic violence suspect; tried to prevent girlfriend from leaving; alcohol, firearms involved	
April 14, 2015	SWAT	Marquette and Pennsylvania	hospitalized with dog bites	charged with domestic violence, burglary while fleeing	
April 22, 2015	BCSO SWAT	Michael Quevedo, 800 block Dolly (off La Vega)	arrested	warrants, domestic violence, felon with firearm	SWAT because "info the detective had and his history"
May 10, 2015	SWAT	1800 block Hiawatha NE	arrested	15-hour standoff, man hiding in television cabinet	domestic violence
October 1, 2015			monitor: officers kneed suspect in head, report does not match video		"no meaningful followup"; officer's supervisor delayed filing a report
November 10, 2015	SWAT	Bell/Pennsylvania	arrested	search warrant, man refused to leave apartment	felony warrants
December 22, 2015	Andrew Quillman, Shawna Romero also present	José Rodriguez, Central/Utah	killed	attempted carjacking, could not drive shift	
May 24, 2016	APD and US Marshalls	Mario Montoya; Central/Western Skies	Montoya's wife arrested for harboring a fugitive	Montoya supposed to be at a halfway house	
June 19, 2016	SWAT	Lomas/Juan Tabo	arrested	"man was not cooperating with officers' requests to come out of a vehicle"	
September 30, 2016	Rodney Locke	Kay Moss-Freese, woman in wheelchair	Moss-Freese killed	Locke quit APD February 2016	Locke arrested
October 22, 2016		Michael David Pacheco, Walgreens Coors/Central	arrested	shots fired at Walgreens miss, Pacheco flees; officer-caused accident at 64th/Churchill	
July 22, 2026		Mireya Molina Ortiz	deceased	Police pursuit ended with officer crashing into unrelated civilian vehicle. Driver killed.	Pending
