= Killing of Da'Quain Johnson =

2026 police killing in Grand Rapids, Michigan

- Date: February 18, 2026
- Location: Eastern Ave SE, Grand Rapids, Michigan, US
- Type: Shooting by law enforcement
- Deaths: 1 (Johnson)

On February 18, 2026, Da'Quain Johnson, a 32-year-old black American man, was shot three times from behind, while restrained by a Grand Rapids Police Department (GRPD) K9 officer in Grand Rapids, Michigan. Johnson died from his gunshot wounds the following day.

== Background ==
Da'Quain Johnson was a 32-year-old Black American man. He was a father to three daughters.

The K9 officer involved in the shooting has not yet been identified.

== Incident ==
Statements from GRPD officials claim that officers suspected Johnson was in possession of a firearm while he was riding a bicycle, and failed to stop him from riding away. A K9 unit then pursued Johnson, following him to the parking lot of Eastern Lofts on Eastern Avenue SE, where he unmounted his bicycle.

Johnson tripped and laid with his stomach on the ground, and was immediately attacked by a police dog. Body camera footage indicates that an officer made orders for Johnson to drop a gun and stop "reaching" with his arms, though Johnson is not seen with a gun in any available footage and was still being detained by a police dog. An officer then fired three shots into Johnson. Immediately after the shooting, one officer remarked "I saw the barrel pointed straight at my face."

Details around the case are actively contested, especially on whether Johnson posed a threat to officers or whether he had resisted officers. Witnesses have disputed the claim that Johnson had ever pointed a gun at police.

Johnson's daughters saw the shooting of their father outside of their apartment.

Johnson died the next morning on Thursday, February 19 while in surgery at a local hospital.

== Aftermath ==
On Thursday, February 19, an official account of the killing was made by the Grand Rapids Police Department in response to "inconsistencies or outright falsehoods being spread on social media." The GRPD released two body camera videos and one dashcam video, with more footage still being processed. Official statements claimed that Johnson posed an immediate threat to officers because he reportedly possessed a gun that was found under his body after the shooting, and that Johnson would have been in violation of parole. The same day, an additional video from a witness was released by Johnson's family that appeared to show Johnson on his stomach being straddled by an officer immediately before being shot three times. Family and advocates have asserted that Johnson was visibly restrained before being shot by police.

Details around the shooting are being reviewed by the Michigan State Police, the GRPD, and the Kent County Prosecutor. David LaGrand, the mayor of Grand Rapids, made a statement promising “the highest degree of transparency" in investigating the killing and offered condolences to Johnson's family. Robert Womack, Kent County Commissioner, decried the official account of the killing and called for more community action, saying that "when it comes to officer related shootings, there is a mantra that continues to happen. We see it on video and then people come out and tell us what we saw with Patrick Lyoya is not what we saw. We see it on video, George Floyd. Then people come out and say: ‘What you saw on video is not what you saw.'”

The official account was immediately contested by the family of Johnson, who claimed that Johnson posed no danger to officers at the time of the shooting. Angelica Johnson, Johnson's mother, said that her son sustained neck injuries from the police dog and had been shot "execution style" in the back of the head while "his hands were being held behind his back." She also alleged that police had racially profiled her son. Johnson's family has asked for peaceful protests.

A vigil attended by family and friends of Johnson was held at the site of the killing the next day. Community responses to the killing have alleged that Johnson had been racially profiled for being Black. Cle Jackson, president of the Grand Rapids NAACP chapter, said that the killing appeared to be "like an assassination of a civilian that should never have happened." Amnesty International made a statement saying "the footage available shows no clear indication that he posed an immediate threat that would justify the use of deadly force."

== See also ==
- Killing of Patrick Lyoya
- List of killings by law enforcement officers in the United States, February 2026
