= Killing of Alfred Redwine =

2014 killing in Albuquerque by police

- Location: Albuquerque, New Mexico, United States
- Date: 25 March 2014
- Attack type: Police shooting
- Weapon: Firearm
- Deaths: 1
- Victim: Alfred Redwine
- Perpetrator: Albuquerque Police officers

On March 25, 2014, Albuquerque Police officers shot and killed Alfred Redwine, a mentally ill African-American man. APD was called around 9pm to the location, a public housing complex at 60th and Central, after Redwine allegedly pointed a gun at two girls then went back into his apartment next door. APD officers shot and killed Alfred Redwine, saying that he had discharged a firearm, hours after a protest over the shooting of James Boyd.

== Shooting ==
Redwine left the apartment with an object held to his head, possibly a cell phone or a firearm. It is unclear if the first shot fired was by Redwine or an APD officer, however, APD said that Redwine fired, at which point they returned fire. APD says a revolver was found at the scene. A neighbor who said she saw the entire incident told a reporter that she "didn't see a gun on Redwine and that he had his arms down, with his palms out" when he was shot. Witnesses said he only had pointed the gun at his own head. Other witnesses said the "gun" was actually a cellphone. His sister, Tammy Redwine said "Then he was dropping his other hand to drop the gun that he had to his head, and when he dropped everything to his sides, that’s when they opened fire and shot him." She told police officers she was on the phone with her brother and he wanted to come out. A neighbor said he heard a man shout "Just do it!" the moment before shots were fired. A KOAT 7 reporter, Mike Springer, narrates a video tape showing the scene as he says, "In this video that was taken by a viewer, you can see Redwine lower his arm. You hear a gunshot and see smoke rise from the ground." It appears as if Redwine fired his gun into the ground.

== Protests ==
In the wake of the Redwine shooting, a second peaceful protest was organized against APD police shootings. Additionally, a video, reportedly released by "Anonymous", called for its members to aim "their canons" at the Albuquerque Police Department's website, and called for Albuquerque citizens to rise up and protest at APD headquarters on March 30, 2014.

Hundreds of demonstrators took to the streets of Albuquerque, marching past police officers in riot gear to protest the spate of police-involved shootings. The Albuquerque Police Department reported their website had been down throughout the day due to a denial-of-service attack. Mayor Richard Berry reported that the peaceful protest had turned to mayhem, responding to the arrest of an unknown number of citizens.

== See also ==
- List of Albuquerque police shootings
- Parrish Dennison
- Kendall Carroll
