= Killing of James Boyd =

2014 shooting in New Mexico, US

Shooting of James Boyd
- Date: Sunday, March 16, 2014
- Location: Albuquerque, Sandia Mountains, New Mexico, U.S.; 35.080927°N 106.482351°W
- Cause: Gunshot wounds
- Filmed by: Albuquerque Police Department helmet camera worn by Dominique Perez, several other police cams, Alexander Thickstun
- Participants: Keith Sandy and Dominique Perez (shooters); James Boyd (victim)
- Outcome: Homicide
- Deaths: James Boyd
- Injuries: Gunshot wounds, blunt force trauma from beanbag rounds, dog bites
- Burial: Sandia Memory Gardens
- Inquiries: FBI, DOJ, OAG, DA, special prosecutor
- Coroner: Office of Medical Examiner at University of New Mexico Hospital
- Suspects: Keith Sandy and Dominique Perez
- Charges: open count murder
- Verdict: Mistrial. Jury deadlocked three – guilty, nine – not guilty
- Convictions: None
- Litigation: Lawsuit by Boyd's family against APD settled for $5 million

James Matthew Boyd (April 8, 1975 – March 16, 2014) was an American man who was fatally shot by Albuquerque Police Department officers Keith Sandy and Dominique Perez in the foothills of the Sandia Mountains in Albuquerque, New Mexico on the evening of March 16, 2014. A resident of a nearby subdivision called police at 3:28 p.m. to report that a man had been camping on the mountain behind his house for the previous month, a violation of local regulations. Two Open Space officers were the first to respond. They approached Boyd as he lay under a sheet of plastic; Boyd, mentally ill with a diagnosis of schizo-affective disorder, became irate, wanting to know why the "raid" was occurring. When an officer tried to pat him down, he produced two pocket knives, threatening the officers with them. The caller watched the confrontation from his second-story window and later testified that Boyd threatened the officers.

The Open Space officers called for backup and Albuquerque police and New Mexico State police responded. A police officer with crisis intervention training testified that he had made some progress with Boyd, but that his supervisor pulled him off and sent him to secure the perimeter of the standoff location. Officer Mikal Monette testified that Boyd never did drop his knives and surrender, but did put them away and agreed to keep his hands out of his pockets. K-9 officer Scott Weimerskirch stepped into the role of negotiator and supervisor, he said, because there was no dialogue taking place when he arrived.

Boyd eventually said he would depart, picked up some of his possessions, and took a step downhill. An officer said "Do it." (referring to the use of a stun grenade). Sandy threw a Stun grenade at Boyd, and Rick Ingram, the acting ROP sergeant at the site, fired his Taser shotgun, but it did not have any noticeable effect on Boyd. At the same time Weimerskirch sent the dog to bite him, then ran to the dog when it attacked the blue bag rather than Boyd. Startled, Boyd produced the knives again. Perez and Sandy testified that they felt he posed an imminent threat to Weimerskirch. Sandy said he moved closer to cover the dog and its handler. As officers approached, Boyd turned a quarter turn to his left and was shot.

Boyd fell forward, face first, away from the officers, wheezing but still holding a knife in each hand. When he did not respond to commands to drop the knives, another officer fired three beanbag shotgun rounds which struck his buttock and the police dog was again sent to bite him. Boyd arrived at the University of New Mexico Hospital emergency room at 8:15 p.m., underwent extensive surgery, and was pronounced dead of massive trauma at 2:55 a.m. the next morning. Surgeons had amputated his right arm, removed his spleen, part of one lung and part of his colon in their efforts to save his life.

A preliminary hearing was held in August 2015, and the trial of two police officers charged with second-degree murder in Boyd's death began on September 20, 2016.

The trial concluded with Judge Alicia Hadfield declaring a mistrial on October 11, 2016. The jury deadlocked with three voting guilty and nine voting not guilty. The jury deliberated for two days after hearing 12 days of testimony in state district court in Albuquerque, New Mexico. In February 2017, Raúl Torrez, the Bernalillo County District Attorney, after having several prosecutors around the state review the case, announced that he would not refile charges against Officers Sandy or Perez. In July 2017 the United States Attorney's Office in New Mexico said, "After a careful and thorough review into the facts surrounding the shooting, federal investigators determined that there is insufficient evidence to prove beyond a reasonable doubt, a violation of the federal statute," ending the inquiry into possible criminal civil rights violations. Sandy retired from the department. Perez was fired but appealed his termination. He won his arbitration and subsequently returned to work at the Department in May 2017. He was assigned to a desk job for a year and was barred from responding to patrol calls or providing services. He was awarded back pay and benefits in the amount of $143,159.

== Background ==
James Matthew "Abba" Boyd, 38, was a white homeless person whom authorities said had been diagnosed with schizophrenia. He had been a prisoner in the Bernalillo County Jail in Albuquerque and the Doña Ana County Jail in Las Cruces, New Mexico. He had also been transported to a psychiatric hospital. The last lawyer to represent Boyd, John McCall, says he had no doubt that Boyd was mentally ill. He said, the New Mexico Behavioral Health Institute, the state mental health hospital in Las Vegas, New Mexico, determined that Boyd was not dangerous, and also that no treatment existed that would render him competent to stand trial. Therefore, they released him. McCall said Boyd was creative but clearly delusional.

A cousin remembered him fondly from visits to an aunt's farm that allowed them both to escape their families for a while. Boyd's cousin described him as funny, sensitive and intelligent. Boyd's alcoholic mother and physically abusive father lost custody of him when he was five; consequently he was in foster homes by the time he was five, and there he was sexually abused. He entered the juvenile justice system at fifteen, where he remained for two years. He was arrested again soon after turning eighteen. Those charges were eventually dropped, but by then he had spit jalapeño at a jailer's eyes and tried to escape. By the time his family got Boyd a lawyer for the new charges, he had already entered a guilty plea and was waiting to be sentenced.

Boyd understood by then that he was mentally ill and asked at his mental health evaluation to receive probation, counseling and job training. But he was found competent to stand trial; he was convicted and sentenced to ten and a half years in jail. All his appeals were denied, and he spent seven years in prison. Todd Holmes, the Alamogordo lawyer who tried to prevent his incarceration in that case, defended Boyd again in 2001. Boyd had been arrested trying to enter Holloman Air Force Base, claiming he was on a mission from former President Gerald Ford that involved national security. Boyd's mental deterioration while in prison was evident to Holmes. He says that, after Boyd's release, the man began to identify as "Abba Mobus Abadon," a name derived from "God" and the Hebrew word for "a bottomless pit".

In January 2002, Boyd was arrested while breaking into the Las Cruces offices of the FBI. In 2005 he was arrested for assault after he told a man in downtown Albuquerque's Civic Plaza "I am God and I want to hurt you." Charges were dropped four months later. Boyd was arrested again in 2007, for refusing to leave a fire station. He had told firefighters that he was a government agent and wanted to send them to hell. At the jail, he punched a corrections officer. In 2009, he got into a fight at St. Martin's, an Albuquerque soup kitchen, and cut another man with a box cutter. In 2010, staffers at the downtown library called police because Boyd was telling people that he was God, frightening them. He "was charged with breaking an Albuquerque police officer's nose during [the] scuffle." While incarcerated, Boyd was charged with breaking a window at the jail. He later said guards had refused to feed him. McCall represented him on the new charge of breaking the window, and Boyd was referred again to the state mental health hospital.

The confrontation with police that resulted in Boyd's death began with a call to police from Northeast Heights resident Alexander Thickstun. Thickstun had first noticed Boyd on February 27, 2014, when he heard Boyd yelling "irrational things" in the darkness at 1 am, and threatening to kill another man in the area. Thickstun called police once in February, and again on March 16, after he had discovered Boyd's illegal campsite - about 100 yards from his home - while on a hike. During Sandy and Perez's murder trial, Thickstun testified that he called police because he was concerned for his own safety and that of his wife. He described Boyd's behavior as "scary" and said that his wife was "terrified."

== Standoff ==
Officers responded to the base of U Mound, the foothill area where Boyd was camped in violation of park rules; these require a permit for camping in City of Albuquerque Open Space areas. Boyd's campsite was 300 yards from the Sandia Mountain Wilderness in the Cibola National Forest. He was within the Albuquerque city limits, in the Foothills Open Space area, and approximately a hundred yards from Thickstun's home.

Two Open Space officers, the first to respond, arrived with guns drawn but not pointed at Boyd. When they tried to search him, Boyd produced a knife with a partially serrated blade about 3 1/2 inches (8.9 cm) long. As the confrontation wore on, Boyd produced another knife and threatened the officers with both of them. A witness, Alexander Thickstun, testified that Boyd threatened to kill the officers if they approached him. One officer, John McDaniel, testified at the preliminary hearing that Boyd did not attack him but threatened him, saying he was going to kill McDaniel and his partner, and refused to show the officers his hands. When the officers tried to pat him down, Boyd displayed two knives and threatened them with the knives, so they did not complete the search, he said. Additional officers responded. Crisis Intervention officer Brock Knipprath, who was at the scene, testified at the preliminary hearing that Boyd would not negotiate and talked nonsense. He testified that this behavior is considered a cue that a person might be mentally ill.

== Sandy's intent before shooting ==
At his trial, Sandy testified for four hours about his actions in the standoff and a comment he made before the shooting to another officer about how he was going to shoot Boyd, whom Sandy referred to as a "lunatic." Two hours before the shooting, officer Keith Sandy encountered New Mexico State Police Sergeant Chris Ware on Piedra Vista, the street closest to Boyd's campsite. Sandy knew Ware from his prior employment with the State Police, and greeted him. Ware's dash cam and belt recorder continued to record as they spoke. Sandy told Ware that Boyd was "a fucking lunatic" and threatened to shoot him during a conversation about Taser shotguns. Sandy had responded to the standoff because a police sergeant had requested a Taser shotgun, and he was carrying one.

Some initially thought his remark was evidence of intent to shoot Boyd, but Ware said that Sandy was referring to using a Taser shotgun when they were talking.

== Shooting ==
At least 19 police officers eventually responded to the scene, from the SWAT, crisis intervention and field services APD teams, as well as the New Mexico State Police, at Boyd's request. The wrongful death lawsuit filed by Boyd's brother against the City of Albuquerque lists 41 individual officers as defendants in addition to the city itself. Special prosecutor Randi Mcginn presented a slide during her opening statement in the trial that showed 19 officers present, "encircling" Boyd. The standoff between Boyd and police forces lasted about four hours, with Boyd making a variety of claims including that he was on a mission for US Special Forces, and could kill all of the officers present with one phone call.

Perez was one of the last to arrive at the scene; he was dispatched at 7:01 p.m. and had been in the South Valley suburb of Los Lunas. Dispatch messages about the call while he was on his way to the scene described Boyd as making threats, with a history of running away from officers and injuring them. He threatened to kill police officers who came near him. At one point crisis intervention officer Mikal Monette was able to talk Boyd into surrendering, but as he was gathering his belongings he was told he could not bring his knives. Boyd stated, "I have every right to bring my knives," and called that deal off.

The sun had set by 7:15, and Boyd was still not giving into police demands. At 7:24 p.m., police officers Keith Sandy and Dominique Perez, K-9 officer Scott Weimerskirch, and a police dog approached Boyd's location. Boyd saw them coming, and gathered some of his belongings as if preparing to voluntarily depart. There appeared to be a chance he'd cooperate, according to video released by APD. He said "All right, don't change up the agreement. I'm going to try to walk with you." Boyd picked up his knapsack and slung it over his shoulder, then picked up a blue nylon bag full of other belongings.

Boyd's hands were empty. He put on his backpack, reached down to pick up a thermos, put it in his right hand and grabbed a blue... bag in his left hand. Just as he took his first step to walk down, Sandy threw a flash-bang grenade.

Sandy said when interviewed that he had wanted to arrest Boyd before complete nightfall, to avoid the problems that darkness would bring. He threw a flash-bang grenade toward Boyd, but it bounced and, according to Sandy, landed in a rocky area to Boyd's right. Officer Rick Ingram fired a Taser shotgun at Boyd, but this did not appear to have any effect. Ingram said later that he had already called for a beanbag shotgun because he knew the Taser would not work. Trial testimony later showed that Boyd was wearing multiple layers of clothing when he was shot, and that one of the Taser probes was returned to police by the medical examiner with Boyd's clothing. Weimerskirch released the police dog to bite Boyd but it was distracted, possibly by the flight and explosion of the flash-bang. In a deposition for the civil rights lawsuit brought by Boyd's family, Weimerskirch said he believed the dog might have been shocked by a Taser probe. As the dog ran up to him, Boyd dropped the bags he had picked up and retrieved his knives from his pockets. With one knife in each hand, he assumed a squared off stance. Officers then ordered Boyd to drop the two knives several times, but he did not comply.

The police dog moved in but did not bite Boyd; The dog grabbed one of the bags and brought it to his handler who had moved towards Boyd in order to get the dog to drop the blue bag. His back-up officers followed. Boyd took a step towards the officers and stopped. The canine handler tried to redirect the dog to Boyd. This put him 8'-10' from Boyd, looking down at his dog. Officers Sandy and Perez both testified at their trial that they thought that Boyd presented an imminent deadly threat to Weimerskirch, the dog handler. Sandy and Perez fired a total of three shots each. Three of those bullets hit Boyd from behind, one in the back and one in each arm. He had been turning around to his left before they started firing and he fell to the ground, face down, still holding both of his knives, wheezing. After he fell to the ground Boyd said "Please don't hurt me. I can't move."

Police approached cautiously thinking the knives might still present a danger. The officer with a beanbag shotgun summoned by Ingram just arrived with the bean bag shotgun just after the rifle fire, and fired three bean bag rounds at Boyd. The handler released the police dog again and it attacked Boyd's lower right leg, biting and shaking his calf. Police then disarmed and handcuffed Boyd as he lay wheezing on the ground. A forensic pathologist later testified that one of the bullets had passed through Boyd's spleen, transverse colon, and lower and upper lobes of a lung. Boyd died early the next morning at the University of New Mexico Hospital. Forensic pathologist Sam Andrews, a prosecution expert witness, testified at the preliminary hearing that Boyd died from gunshot wounds and sheer loss of blood.

A May 29, 2014 autopsy report, by the medical examiner at the University of New Mexico said a toxicology screen had been negative. Boyd did not have either drugs or alcohol in his system when he died.

== Other considerations ==
The X12 Taser shotgun officer Rick Ingram fired at Boyd had been withdrawn from the market. Taser said this was due to "flagging sales." The drop in sales can be attributed to concerns about reliability, said Perez attorney Luis Robles, who is also a use-of-force expert. "It is an over-engineered weapon that had too many problems and not enough impact," he said. The city had been notified two years earlier that Taser would no longer support or service these shotguns. It was not supposed to be in use, nor were the rounds in the X12, which had expired two months earlier. ROP was the only police unit still using the Taser shotguns.

The APD dispatcher had called Sandy, who was off-duty but on call, to ask him to bring a Taser shotgun to the standoff in the foothills. Sandy, despite having been quickly informed that the onsite supervisor intended to call out the Gang unit not ROP, drove to the scene anyway, telling the dispatcher to cancel the call to gangs since he was already en route. He had with him four weapons: his handgun, a bean bag shotgun, the Taser shotgun, which he gave to Ingram, and an assault rifle, which he kept. He volunteered to provide lethal cover and went up the trail with his rifle.

Both Albuquerque's inspector general and the New Mexico state auditor have investigated the relationship between Taser and then-police-chief Ray Schultz.

According to the prosecutor at the preliminary hearing, Sandy and Perez weren't separated following the incident and weren't interviewed until two days later.

== Legal proceedings ==
The Albuquerque Police Department maintains that the shooting was justified. Police Chief Gordon Eden said at a press conference following the shooting that he believed it was justified: "Yes, if you follow case law, Garner vs Tennessee there was directed threat to an officer." After Mayor Richard Berry said that Eden was mistaken, Chief Eden said that his comments that the shooting was justified, were premature. The FBI announced on March 28, 2014, that it would investigate the death. The Bernalillo County District Attorney's Office also investigated Boyd's death. Of the 36 lapel camera videos released after the shooting, one belonged to an officer who shot him. The lawyer who represented Boyd's brother in his wrongful death suit against the city described the scene as chaotic and poorly managed, with officers confronting Boyd, rather than seeking to de-escalate the situation. They contradicted his claim that he worked for the Department of Defense and argued with him about whether he was being unreasonable.

=== Criminal charges ===
On January 12, 2015, the Bernalillo County District Attorney Kari Brandenburg charged Keith Sandy and Dominique Perez with an open count of murder. This charge allows them to be convicted of either first or second-degree murder, which carry sentences of 30 years to life and 19 years minimum respectively, or voluntary manslaughter, which carries a maximum sentence of seven years.

During the preliminary hearing Judge Neil Candelaria dismissed the first degree murder charges against the officers, stating that the necessary premeditation did not exist. Sandy and Perez still faced charges of second degree murder and voluntary manslaughter. But on September 28, after the prosecution had completed its case, Judge Alicia Hadfield dismissed the manslaughter charges, leaving only the more serious 2nd degree murder charges remaining, stating that the prosecution had not shown that the officers had been provoked by anger or the heat of passion, necessary factors to support such a charge. By the time the jury started deliberations, the officers faced second degree murder charges and Sandy faced an additional, lesser charge, of aggravated battery.[66][67] The prosecution and defense testimony concluded on October 5, 2016, with closing arguments and jury instructions scheduled for the next day.[68]

On October 11, 2016, Judge Alicia Hadfield declared a mistrial in the case. The jury deadlocked with three voting guilty and nine voting not guilty. The state district court jury deliberated for two days after hearing 12 days of testimony. The special prosecutor, Randi McGinn said that she was not surprised by the verdict, adding that police use of force has become a polarizing issue. McGinn said that it would be up to the incoming District Attorney, Raul Torrez, who is running unopposed, to decide whether to retry Sandy and Perez. However, under local rules, the prosecution has 30 days from the date of the mistrial to notify the court whether to schedule a new trial. This period will run out before Torrez takes office. It is unclear if the special prosecutor McGinn or the current DA, whose office was removed from the case, will be the one to make the decision as to a new trial.

Sandy's attorney, Sam Bregman, said that the jury sent "a pretty positive message ... that the case is pretty weak." He called the prosecution "misguided" and added that he hopes the DA's office will look at the "weak jury support" and will "let these two good men get on with their lives.

According to DA Brandenburg the trial of the officers cost the taxpayers more than $82,850. That includes expert witness fees, travel expenses and transcripts. The Special Prosecutor, Randi McGinn was paid $5,400. The state's use of force expert, Jeff Noble, was paid $7,600 and he was reimbursed for his travel expenses. These figures do not include the costs of what the court paid to hold the trial.

=== Special Prosecutor ===
On January 12, 2015, Bernalillo County District Attorney Kari Brandenburg announced that she would file murder charges against Sandy and Perez. Attorneys for Perez filed a motion with the court to have her removed. As a result, Judge Alisa Hadfield disqualified the entire Second Judicial District Attorney's Office, stating, "Disqualification of DA Brandenburg is necessary to ensure the appearance of fairness of trial and to ensure, public trust or confidence in the criminal justice system." The APD had alleged she tried to bribe and intimidate witnesses in a burglary case against her son. Brandenburg said she spoke to the witnesses as a private individual and did not offer them money, because that would be illegal, but the witnesses said that Brandenburg offered to reimburse them for their losses if they did not tell police or pursue charges against her son. The New Mexico Attorney General, Hector Balderas, said that there was no evidence to prosecute Brandenburg. Brandenburg's son had a string of DUI and theft charges at the time. In January 2016 the son was sentenced to three years in jail in connection with the burglary and larceny charges. He had previously agreed to serve a year in a shoplifting case. Brandenburg heatedly denied wrongdoing either with respect to her son's legal problems or to the shooting charges.

State Attorney-General Hector Balderas agreed after he investigated that there was no evidence of wrongdoing, although he did say that she should have asked for a special prosecutor to avoid the appearance of impropriety. He also said that some police actions in the case appeared to stem from "political considerations".

=== Appointment of a special prosecutor ===
On April 16, Brandenburg named private attorney Randi McGinn special prosecutor for the case, saying that the Attorney-General's office and thirteen other DA offices around the state had all declined to take the case for reasons of either budget or case load. McGinn, a civil-rights trial attorney who recently represented a plaintiff in a wrongful death suit against the city, was paid $5,400 – what a public defender would receive for a death penalty case. McGinn filed charges of second degree murder and voluntary and involuntary manslaughter against the two officers.

At the preliminary hearing, District Court Judge Neil Candelaria dismissed the involuntary manslaughter charges, saying they were not appropriate in this case, which seemed "more of intentional and I haven't heard much of anything unintentional." This was the least serious of the charges, and the officers still faced trial on the voluntary manslaughter, second-degree murder, and assault charges that remained.

On June 22, 2015, court document filings showed McGinn seeking charges of second degree murder against Sandy and Perez. The filing also includes accusations of voluntary manslaughter, involuntary manslaughter, and aggravated assault. A preliminary hearing for the case began on August 3, 2015. The murder trial began in the week of September 21, 2015. Testimony included the reticence of an Albuquerque Open Space officer. (Note: The standoff took place at the edge of Albuquerque's city limits, very close to where Copper ends and the Copper trailhead up into the mountain begins. The city calls these areas "Open Space," as opposed to the city parks of the Rio Grande's North Valley, South Valley, downtown, Old Town, Northeast Heights or International District neighborhoods, which are much more grassy and cultivated than the high desert of the open space areas on the city fringes. There are also open space areas in the wooded bosque along the river. Open Space officers are city not APD employees, but they are commissioned police officers like some rangers in national parks.) officer who said he did not fire because he feared repercussions.

APD officer Mikal Monette had crisis intervention training and had successfully resolved hundreds of situations. He testified at trial that an APD sergeant removed him from the bargaining process, replacing him with Detective Sandy and others shortly before Boyd was mortally wounded. This was even though Monette had made some progress and had succeeded in getting Boyd, at one point, to agree to leave with him. The judge dismissed the charges of involuntary manslaughter on September 28, leaving only the more serious 2nd degree murder charges remaining. Under state law, involuntary manslaughter implies either provocation by the victim or behavior emanating from the "heat of passion." The prosecution and defense testimony concluded on October 5, 2016, with closing arguments and jury instructions scheduled for the next day.

=== Wrongful Death Lawsuit ===
In June 2014, the brother of James Boyd, Andrew Jones, filed a wrongful death lawsuit against the Albuquerque Police Department. The lawsuit asked that the city and the police department put in place given corrective measures including better training for law enforcement officers in how to deal with individuals suffering from mental illness, requiring all officers be trained in crisis intervention, that anyone "subjected to force" during any encounter with the Albuquerque Police Department be given prompt medical attention, and that the city establish a fund called the "James Matthew Boyd Emergency Outreach Team" which would provide resources for local doctors and others to help people who are homeless and experiencing a mental health crisis.

=== Department of Justice Investigation ===
The U.S. Department of Justice released a scathing report on April 10, 2014, saying Albuquerque's Police Department "engages in a pattern or practice of using excessive force during the course of arrests and other detentions in violation of the Fourth Amendment ... Albuquerque police officers often use deadly force in circumstances where there is no imminent threat of death or serious bodily harm to officers or others." It cited an incident in which officers Tasered a man who had poured gasoline on himself, accidentally setting him on fire.

The report did not investigate the Boyd shooting, which happened shortly before its release, but said Chief Eden's comments about it as an example of systemic problems in the APD. "The recent remarks by the police chief in response to the James Boyd shooting on March 16, 2014, demonstrate that more work is needed to change the culture of APD," it said.

"Supervisors marked as 'reasonable' almost every use of force report form we saw," said the report, and officers were almost never reprimanded for failing to turn on their cameras. The report also cited a pattern of violence against people who were mentally ill or unable to comply due to their mental state. One developmentally disabled man was tasered, kicked and beaten, yet his attacker was never charged with any crime.

City officials signed a 106-page consent decree with the Department of Justice in response to the report, but the shootings have continued.

"Police shootings have dropped since the DOJ Report was released and the APD instituted changes in policy and training to conform to the consent decree." As a result of the consent decree APD officers now receive training on how to minimize the use of force in high stress situations. The court monitor said, "The SWAT unit has become one of the strongest teams within the department." Officers have used their guns less since receiving this training. In 2013 eight shootings resulting in death or injuries. In 2015 that number dropped to five. Officers used their guns 15 times in 2013 and 10 times in 2015.

== Officers ==
Keith Sandy had faced criminal fraud charges in 2007, as one of four police officers who were receiving payments for teaching classes from Wackenhut, a private security contractor, while simultaneously working for the New Mexico State Police and being paid to attend a class. One resigned and Sandy and two others were fired. That case against Officer Sandy was later dropped, since no charges had been filed against him. Then-Deputy Chief Mike Castro said when he hired him afterwards as a civilian investigator, that Sandy would not be badged or allowed to carry a gun. Those restrictions were lifted later.

Sandy also launched a case against the chief criminal judge in the county, causing the latter's resignation. However, the District Attorney of the First Judicial District characterized it as a "terrible" case, and "a mess," and that as a result, it could not be prosecuted. Officer Sandy joined the Repeat Offender Unit, considered an elite assignment. Sandy's father was also an Albuquerque police officer, who was shot on-duty. No video of the Boyd shooting was recovered from Sandy's camera; it either malfunctioned or was never turned on. Sandy was allowed to retire from the Albuquerque Police Department in November 2014. However, the APD internal affairs investigation continued.

K-9 officer Scott Weimerkirch was found in the 2012 federal Nelson v City of Albuquerque District Court case to have used his police dog in an unconstitutional use of police force, yet, according to the Boyd wrongful death suit, he had received no disciplinary sanction, counseling, or corrective training as a result. The case was similar to Boyd's, in that the dog tore flesh from Boyd's leg in much the same manner as he had torn flesh from the arm of an unthreatening suspect in Nelson. Weimerkirch and the dog have both since retired.

Albuquerque police told the media, "Perez must also complete all of the department's new training related to our settlement agreement, along with state required training, and pass a psychological exam."

APD officer Mikal Monette had crisis intervention training and had successfully resolved hundreds of situations. He testified at trial that an APD sergeant removed him from the bargaining process, replacing him with Detective Sandy and others shortly before Boyd was mortally wounded. This was even though Monette had made some progress and had succeeded in getting Boyd, at one point, to agree to leave with him. But when Boyd learned that he could not bring his knives, he stated, "I have every right to bring my knives," and called that deal off. When questioned by the defense, Monette admitted that Boyd would need to actually cooperate with the commands that Monette was giving him, before the situation could be deescalated.

== Protests ==
A protest was held on March 25, 2014, in response to the shooting of James Boyd. Thousands of people marched through downtown Albuquerque and the Nob Hill area of the city.

On the three-month anniversary of Boyd's death, a group of people held a vigil at his campsite in his honor, singing Amazing Grace and vowing to improve the lives of the homeless and the mentally ill in Albuquerque.

== History of APD Police Shootings ==
The Albuquerque City Council unsuccessfully tried September 7, 2011 to override an August 19 veto by Mayor Richard Berry of the council's bill requesting a Department of Justice investigation into police violence.

Because of a long string of police shootings before Boyd's, the United States Department of Justice had already initiated an investigation into APD police violence. A key finding of its April 2014 report was that "the Albuquerque Police Department engages in a pattern or practice of unreasonable use of deadly force in officers' use of firearms." Prior to the charges against Perez and Sandy, no APD officer had faced prosecution in a death resulting from police violence since 1977.

On March 25, 2014, the same day as a protest over the shooting of Boyd, APD police officers shot and killed Alfred Redwine, saying that he had discharged a firearm. Witnesses said he only had pointed the gun at his own head. Other witnesses said the "gun" was actually a cellphone. His sister, Tammy Redwine said "Then he was dropping his other hand to drop the gun that he had to his head, and when he dropped everything to his sides, that's when they opened fire and shot him." She told police officers she was on the phone with her brother and he wanted to come out. A neighbor said he heard a man shout "Just do it!" the moment before shots were fired. A KOAT 7 reporter, Mike Springer, narrates a video tape showing the scene as he says, "In this video that was taken by a viewer, you can see Redwine lower his arm. You hear a gunshot and see smoke rise from the ground." It appears as if Redwine fired his gun into the ground. Redwine's death sparked another protest on the 30th, from noon into the night. Police did clash with demonstrators at this demonstration, eventually using tear gas after, they said, some protesters threw rocks. As the FBI launched an investigation into Boyd's death, "graffiti splashed across downtown Albuquerque, declaring, "We are James Boyd," said the Santa Fe New Mexican.

On April 21, 2014, APD officer Jeremy Dear killed 19-year-old Mary Hawkes by shooting her three times as she ran away from him. Hawkes was suspected of having been in a stolen car. Dear said she pointed a handgun at him, but his lapel cam either did not record the encounter or was not turned on. Hawkes had methamphetamine in her system when she died. Dear had a history of excessive force complaints and repeated failure to record arrests with his lapel camera. He was fired for insubordination. He successfully appealed his firing; the appeals board voted 3–2 to overturn his termination.

City records show that between 2009 and 2014, Albuquerque Police Department officers were involved in 47 shootings. Deaths resulted from 32 of these shootings. The Department of Justice reviewed 20 shootings from 2009 to 2010 and in its final report said that a majority of them had violated the suspect's constitutional rights. Police Chief Gorden Eden attributed the situation to "systemic failure in our ability to track employee misconduct," and said that he believed "there are people on the force who shouldn't be on the force." However, he said, because union rules make it difficult to discipline officers retroactively, "we may be stuck with them."

=== History of wrongful death litigation ===
Civil lawsuits have cost the city at least $23 million. This figure includes $7.95 million paid to the family of Kenneth Ellis, who was shot as he held a gun to his own head, and $900,000 to the family of Alan Gomez, an unarmed man shot with a spoon in his hand by Sean Wallace, who had previously shot two other men in the line of duty. The city was ordered to pay $6 million in another shooting from April 12, 2011, after a judge said the police officers' story was not credible. The detective in that case jumped over a garden wall and shot a mentally ill man named Christopher Torres in his parents' backyard. The police said that Torres, who was shot in the back, tried to take a gun from the waistband of one of the officers. However, a neighbor called police to report that two men were attacking Torres. The officers wore plainclothes attire and the neighbor thought he was being robbed.

== See also ==
- List of Albuquerque police shootings
- Kendall Carroll - Albuquerque police shooting
- Parrish Dennison - Albuquerque police shooting
- Alfred Redwine shooting – Albuquerque police shooting
- Tennessee v. Garner – concerns deadly force by police
- Graham v. Connor – objective reasonableness standard applies to law enforcement use of force
- AELE (Americans for Effective Law Enforcement) – delaying questioning of police officers after stressful situations
