= Sherman Park, Milwaukee =

Neighborhood in Milwaukee

Sherman Park
- Neighborhood of Milwaukee
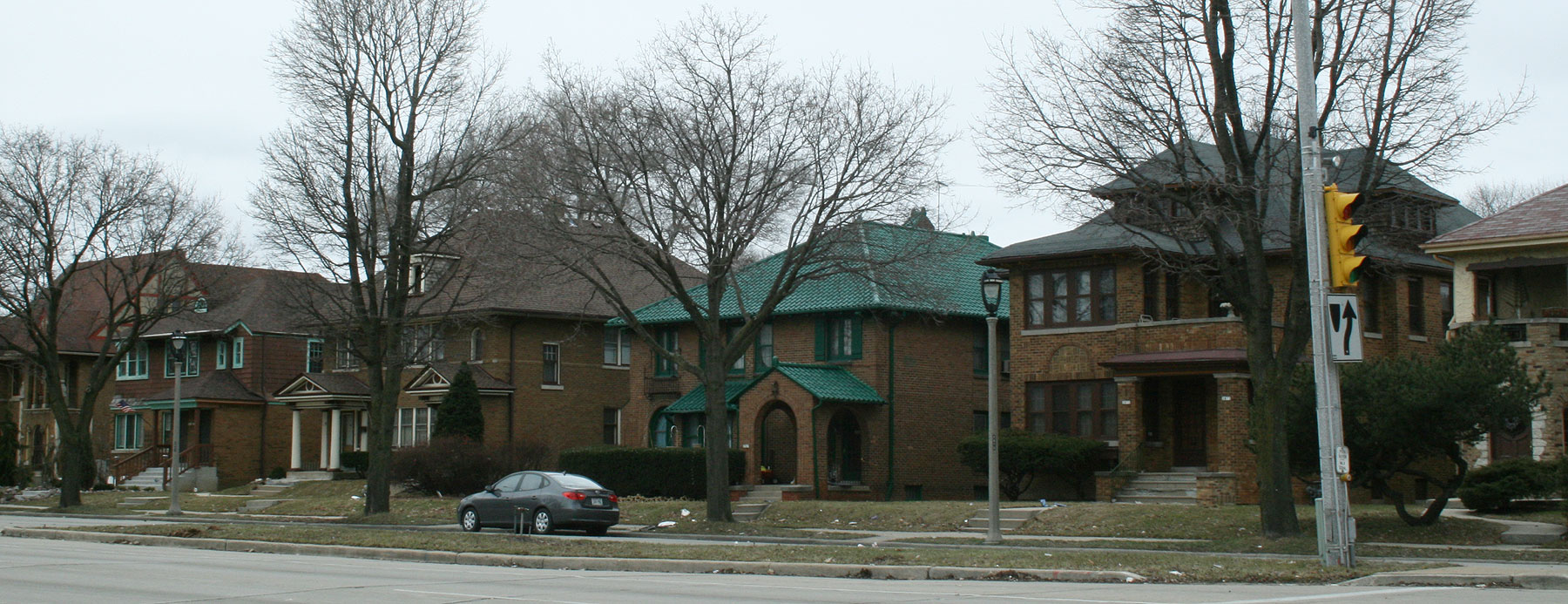
- Homes on Sherman Boulevard in the Sherman Park Neighborhood
- Location in Milwaukee
- Coordinates: 43°04′18″N 87°57′39″W
- Country: United States
- State: Wisconsin

Population (2020 United States Census)
  - Total: About 32 000
- Time zone: Central
  - Summer (DST): CST
- ZIP Code: 53210 and 53216
- Area code: Area code 414

Sherman Park is a historic neighborhood located on the northwest side of Milwaukee, Wisconsin. Bound roughly by West Capitol Drive to the north, West Lloyd Street to the south, North 30th Street to the east, and North 60th Street to the west, the neighborhood centers around the 27.5-acre county park of the same name.

The neighborhood primarily developed between the 1900s and the 1930s, as a residential area featuring a variety of architectural styles, including Arts and Crafts bungalows, Tudor Revivals, and Duplexes. Historically one of Milwaukee's most densely populated communities, it became noted during the mid-to-late 20th century for its racial and religious integration. The area continues to maintain a mix of African American, Jewish, and white working-class residents.

While the neighborhood has faced significant socioeconomic challenges, commercial disinvestment, and housing shifts in recent decades, the neighborhood remains a culturally rich anchor of Milwaukee's northwest side, supported by active grassroots community organizations, historical preservation efforts, and grassroots economic redevelopment initiatives. It contains the neighborhoods of Grasslyn Manor, Sunset Heights, Roosevelt Grove, St. Joseph's and Uptown neighborhood.

== History ==
In 1891, the city brought land near the intersection of Sherman Boulevard and Burleigh Street. The park, which was originally named Perrigo Park, had its name changed to "Sherman Park' to honor William Tecumseh Sherman.

Between 1967 and 1970 protests occurred in the neighborhood around discriminatory real estate practices against African Americans. This culminated with the founding of the Sherman Park Community Association which became an advocacy group for the well-being of the neighborhood.

The section known as Grasslyn Manor in particular is home to a large Orthodox Jewish population.

The closure of many industrial businesses along the 30th Street Corridor caused the loss of a major base of middle class employment. Issues around violent crime, education, and substandard housing remain persistent in the neighborhood. The advocacy group Common Ground led a campaign in 2016 to secure funds to demolish or renovate derelict properties in the neighborhood. Between August 13 and 15, 2016, civil unrest occurred in the neighborhood after Milwaukee Police officer Dominique Heaggan-Brown fatally shot 23-year-old Sylville Smith near 44th and Auer. In 2018, the Sherman Phoenix, an indoor shopping mall, opened at 3536 W. Fond du Lac Ave, in a building that formerly occupied a BMO Bank.

== North Sherman Boulevard Historic District ==
The North Sherman Boulevard Historic District is a largely intact neighborhood of stylish homes built from 1907 to 1955 in Milwaukee, Wisconsin. It was added to the National Register of Historic Places in 2004.

=== History ===
Before 1890 the land that now contains the district was rural, outside the city limits of Milwaukee, but the city was growing. In that year the Milwaukee Park Commission bought the land that would become Washington Park. In 1891 it bought the 24 acres that would become Sherman Park. In 1899 the city annexed both parcels. By 1901 the name "Sherman Boulevard" was in use and in years that followed, residential subdivisions were laid out in the area. In 1910 the city officially designated the street as a boulevard, meaning that a landscaped median runs between the two roadways.

Here are some good examples of structures of different styles in the district:

- The Dr. Franklin Hambach house at 2134 N. Sherman Blvd. is a 1 1/2-story house built in 1911, designed by Theo. F. Schutz in Spanish Colonial Revival style, characterized by the shaped parapets that front the gable ends and the brick arcade that is the front of the porch.
- The Herman Hummel house at 2411 Sherman Blvd. is a 1 1/2-story bungalow designed by Charles Valentine and built in 1912. It is clad in brick and stucco, with a full-width front porch.
- The Albert & Elizabeth Nortmann house at 2141-43 N. Sherman Blvd. is a 2-story Neoclassical-styled house with a colossal front portico supported by four Ionic columns. It was designed by F.W. Andree and built in 1914.
- The Arthur F. Milbath duplex at 2401-03 N. Sherman Blvd. is a 2-story Tudor Revival-styled structure, designed by Charles Valentine. The upper story is clad in stucco with half-timbering framing some windows. Milbath was an executive of Wisconsin Motor Manufacturing Co.
- The Rottman and Dapper duplex at 2319-21 N. Sherman Blvd. is a 2-story Prairie style structure designed by Leiser and Holst and built in 1916. Hallmarks of the style are the horizontal emphasis and the banks of windows.
- The Dr. Phillip Schmitt house at 2124-26 N. Sherman Blvd is a 2 1/2-story Queen Anne style house with Craftsman influence. It was designed by F.W. Andree and built in 1909.
- The Floyd E. Jenkins duplex at 2811-13 N. Sherman Blvd. is a 2-story duplex built in 1922 by Gilbert Steuerwald. The style is Craftsman, its hallmark being the exposed rafter tails below the eaves. The hip roof is also fairly typical of Craftsman, but the large cube-like form is not.
- The Third Church of Christ Scientist at 2915 N. Sherman Blvd. is a 3-story Neoclassical-styled church designed by Frank Howend and built in 1923. Each side features a colonnade with arched windows between the columns and a low dome rises in the center of the roof.
- The Henry L. Grieb house at 2430 N. Sherman Blvd. is a 1 1/2-story brick house built in 1923. Its style is Colonial Revival, signaled by the columns that support the surround above the doorway. Grieb was an insurance agent. Timothy Heggland observes in the NRHP nomination that Colonial Revival style is much less common in this district than in most around the state that were constructed in the same period. He posits this is because this style is usually clad in wood, and the settlers of this district had enough money to choose houses clad in more expensive brick and stucco, which require less maintenance in the long run.
- The William & Amanda Maertz house at 2602 N. Sherman Blvd. is a rambling 1-story Rustic-styled house built in 1924 with walls of whole saddle-notched logs, and with tapered cobblestone chimneys. William and his family owned and managed movie theaters. William also worked for Schuster's Department store.
- The Sol & Esther Blankstein house at 3259 N. Sherman Blvd. is a 2-story house built in 1939, designed by R.O. Razall in Mediterranean Revival style, with round-arched French doors and windows on the first floor and a hip roof covered in reddish barrel tile - characteristic of the style.

== See also ==
- Neighborhoods of Milwaukee
