= Andres Valdez =

American social activist

- Born: Denver, Colorado, U.S.
- Occupation: Social activist

Andres Valdez is an American social activist from Albuquerque, New Mexico.

== Early life and education ==
Valdez was born in Denver, Colorado, and raised in San Luis, Colorado. Though once employed as a carpenter, he now works as a professional activist.

== Activism ==
In November 1997 Valdez was appointed by the city of Albuquerque to the "Task Force on Police Oversight," a city council convened advisory group formed to make recommendations on a new system of oversight for Albuquerque's police department. He requested appointment to a 2013 task force convened by the council to make a new series of recommendations on the police oversight system, though the council declined to make him a member.

Since 2002, Valdez has filed a variety of complaints and lawsuits against the city of Albuquerque and city officials, including former mayor Martin Chávez and current mayor Richard J. Berry, and has been involved in a number of demonstrations that have interrupted city meetings and events.

In 1997, and again in 2014, he attempted to serve "arrest warrants" he had self-signed against police officers. In 2006 Valdez and Gwen Packard led a protest prior to the city's Martin Luther King Jr. Day Parade saying they wanted to end the "glamorization of Native American oppression by Albuquerque's Tri-Centennial initiative." In 2010 Valdez received $10,000 in an out-of-court settlement by the city over a lawsuit he had brought after being ruled out-of-order during the public comment period at a police oversight commission meeting. During a May 2014 demonstration by Valdez and several dozen protesters at the chambers of the Albuquerque city council, Valdez announced a "coup d'etat" against the city's government. The city council president ultimately adjourned the meeting and it was reconvened several days later.

== Political campaigns ==
In 1997 Valdez sought election to the Albuquerque city council, ultimately losing to Tim Kline with 13-percent of the vote.

In 2012 Valdez announced his candidacy for U.S. Senate. In an early debate he declared Martin Heinrich a "pup" who lacked life experience, though, subsequently withdrew from the race citing "the outrageous amount of money needed to run".
