= Sherman Phoenix =

Mall in Milwaukee, Wisconsin, United States

Coordinates: 43°4′34.5″N 87°57′29.5″W

Sherman Phoenix is a shopping mall in the northwest side of Milwaukee, Wisconsin.

It opened in 2018 after civil unrest in the city caused local leaders to collaborate and find a way to create a more "inclusive economy." The building was built out of a BMO Harris Bank building that had been burned during the city's unrest. The building features a mural by Detroit artist Sydney James, partially funded by Gener8tor, the startup accelerator.

Black entrepreneurs across the country have been inspired by the mall. It struggled through its first years due to closures from the Covid-19 pandemic, but was able to survive through takeout orders and additional fundraising.

The mall is located at 3536 W. Fond du Lac Ave.
