= David Correia =

University of New Mexico professor and writer

- Education: University of Iowa
- Scientific career
- Fields: Geography, American studies
- Workplaces: University of New Mexico

David Correia is a writer, activist, and professor of geography and environmental studies at the University of New Mexico. His writing and teaching focus on land speculation, labor struggle, New Mexico, and U.S. colonial and settler colonial history. His political activism focuses on police violence and abolition.

== Education and career ==
Correia completed his undergraduate study in Anthropology at the University of Iowa and earned a Ph.D. in Geography from the University of Kentucky in 2006. Prior to his current appointment at the University of New Mexico, Correia taught at the University of Maine.

In 2012, Correia was the recipient of the University of New Mexico's "Arts and Sciences Award for Teaching Excellence".

== Activism ==
Correia has been frequently quoted and interviewed regarding police reform in the city of Albuquerque, New Mexico, and is an activist against police violence in the city.

On June 2, 2014, Correia and some two dozen other protesters participated in a non-violent sit-in at the office of Mayor Richard Berry. The demonstration was organized in response to the ongoing Albuquerque police shootings, including the April 21 killing of 19-year-old Mary Hawkes and the May 3 death of Armand Martin.

Thirteen protesters were arrested at the June 2 sit-in, including Correia, who was arrested for allegedly assaulting a police officer. Fellow protesters disputed the charges, claiming that "Correia had his arms by his side and attempted to walk past the guard, who then bumped him against a wall." Video taken during the protest seems to corroborate Correia's claim to innocence. Correia pleaded not guilty and the case was reviewed by the District Attorney. The charges were later dropped.

Since his arrest, Correia has received support from the American Association of University Professors, the Association of American Geographers, and a Change.org petition which has collected upwards of 4,000 signatures.

== Writing ==
Correia is frequently the recipient of prestigious fellowships in support of his writing and research. He was a Lannan Residency Fellow, received a Henry Belin du Pont Fellowship, and held the Adele Hast Fellowship in American History in 2025, among many others.

In 2013, Correia published Properties of Violence: Law and Land Grant Struggle in Northern New Mexico which traces the story of the much-contested Tierra Amarilla land grant from its origins in 1832 to the present day. According to the publisher, the book "provocatively suggests that violence is not the opposite of property but rather is essential to its operation." Academic Don Mitchell called the book "engaged, critical, historical geography as it ought to be done."

Correia also writes extensively on questions of environmental and economic justice for the local alternative press. He penned the manifesto of the environmental blog La Jicarita, subtitled "Environmental Politics as if People Really Mattered," describing the site as striving to be a "place where radical political action can be considered and debated" and one that rejects "the bourgeois notion that the individual is the privileged political actor in society," arguing instead for collective efforts to save the environment.

In an article for Capitalism Nature Socialism about popular author Jared Diamond titled "F**k Jared Diamond" Correia opines that Diamond's Pulitzer Prize winning book Guns, Germs and Steel was "dull," and "chockfull of the bad and the worse, the random and the racist." Correia's critique stems from his assertion that Diamond "develops an argument about human inequality based on a determinist logic that reduces social relations such as poverty, state violence, and persistent social domination, to inexorable outcomes of geography and environment."

== Bibliography ==
=== Books ===
- Correia, David (2024). Set the Earth on fire: the Great Anthracite Coal Strike of 1902 and the birth of the police. Chicago, IL: Haymarket Books
- Correia, David (2022). An enemy such as this: Larry Casuse and the struggle for Native liberation in one family on two continents over three centuries. Chicago, IL: Haymarket Books. ISBN 978-1-64259-737-0.
- Correia, David (2013). Properties of Violence: Law and Land Grant Struggle in Northern New Mexico. Athens: University of Georgia Press. ISBN 9780820345826.
- Correia, David; Wall, Tyler (2018). Police: a Field Guide. Verso Books. ISBN 9781786630148.

=== Journal articles ===
- Correia, David (2007). "The sustained yield forest management act and the roots of environmental conflict in Northern New Mexico". Geoforum. 38 (5): 1040–1051. doi:10.1016/j.geoforum.2007.02.009. ISSN 0016-7185.
- Correia, David (2008). ""Rousers of the Rabble" in the New Mexico land grant war: La Alianza Federal De Mercedes and the violence of the state". Antipode. 40 (4): 561–583. Bibcode:2008Antip..40..561C. doi:10.1111/j.1467-8330.2008.00624.x. ISSN 0066-4812.
- Correia, David (2009). "Making destiny manifest: United States territorial expansion and the dispossession of two Mexican property claims in New Mexico, 1824-1899". Journal of Historical Geography. 35 (1): 87–103. doi:10.1016/j.jhg.2008.02.002. ISSN 0305-7488.
- Correia, David (2015). "David L. Caffey. Chasing the Santa Fe Ring: power and privilege in territorial New Mexico". Natural Resources Journal. 4: 927. ISSN 0028-0739.
