= 2026 in Wisconsin =

- Decades: 2000s; 2010s; 2020s
- See also: History of Wisconsin; Historical outline of Wisconsin; List of years in Wisconsin; 2026 in the United States

The following is a list of events of the year 2026 in Wisconsin.

== Incumbents ==
=== State government ===
- Governor: Tony Evers (D)
- Lieutenant governor: Sara Rodriguez (D)
- Attorney general: Josh Kaul (D)
- Secretary of State: Sarah Godlewski (D)
- Treasurer: John Leiber (R)

== Events ==
=== January ===
- January 3 – Judge Hannah Dugan, who had been convicted of obstruction in December for helping an immigrant evade ICE officers, submits her resignation from office.
- January 4 – The Wisconsin–River Falls Falcons beat the North Central Cardinals 24–14 in the 2025 NCAA Division III football championship, its first title.

=== February ===
- February 13 – A shipwreck searching organization announces they have located the remains of the SS Lac La Belle, which sank in 1872, in the waters of Lake Michigan near Racine and Kenosha. The discovery was made in 2022, but was not announced until 2026.
- February 25 – State Representative Sylvia Ortiz-Velez (D–Milwaukee) is charged with disorderly conduct in connection with an incident that occurred in August 2025. The incident was connected to a feud Ortiz-Velez had with another state legislator she believed had intentionally excluded her from a resolution honoring Hispanic Americans and veterans for Hispanic Heritage Month.

=== March ===
- March 13–17 – The March 2026 North American blizzard hits Wisconsin, setting new snowfall records in the Wausau area, and causing significant power outages and traffic accidents.
- March 22 – The Wisconsin Badgers beat the Ohio State Buckeyes 3–2 to win the 2026 NCAA Division I women's ice hockey tournament, their second straight title. It is also the fourth consecutive year in which the two teams have played against each other in the tournament final.
- March 30 – ICE detains Salah Sarsour, the president of Wisconsin's largest mosque, at his Milwaukee home.

=== April ===
- April 7
  - Judge Chris Taylor, the Democratic-backed candidate, wins election to the Wisconsin Supreme Court. The result solidifies and expands the court’s liberal majority to 5–2.
  - 2026 Waukesha mayoral election: Common Council President Alicia Halvensleben (D) wins election, beating Republican Scott Allen. The election is decided by less than 500 votes.
- April 15 – Governor Evers declares a state of emergency after storms hit the Milwaukee area, causing floods.
- April 18 – Animal welfare activists attempt to storm Ridglan Farm, a beagle breeding and research facility in Blue Mounds, though they are unable to take any dogs. The group's leader, Wayne Hsiung, is arrested. The same organization had taken 30 dogs from the same facility in March.

=== May ===
- May 26 – Josh Jacobs, Green Bay Packers running back, is arrested in Brown County for five charges of domestic violence.

=== June ===
- June 18 – A federal judge orders ICE to release Salah Sarsour on First Amendment grounds, siding with Sarsour's claim that he was targeted for speaking in favor of Palestinian rights.

=== July ===
- July 3 – Three people are killed when a boat overturns on Geneva Lake in Lake Geneva. Seven others are rescued.
- July 10 – In Wisconsin State Legislature v. Kaul, the Court rules 5–2 on statutory textualism regarding the Attorney General's handling of uncommitted settlement funds.
- July 16 – The Wisconsin Department of Health Services reports the first hospitalization of the summer in Wisconsin in connection with the cyclosporiasis outbreak.
- July 22 – A Madison Police officer fatally shoots homeless man Corey Ruiz during an arrest, sparking protests. The MPD says Ruiz had attacked an officer with a knife, and that there is no body-camera footage of the shooting.

=== August ===
- August 4 – Madison police clear a protest encampment that had been set up at the site of Corey Ruiz's killing, 13 days after it was set up. 16 people are arrested.
- August 11 – 2026 Wisconsin gubernatorial election: Milwaukee County Executive David Crowley wins the Democratic primary for governor, beating State Representative Francesca Hong.

=== September ===
- September 12 – Representative and gubernatorial candidate Tom Tiffany suffers minor injuries when a small plane loses power and makes an emergency landing on Lake Wausau in Wausau. Tiffany and the pilot both swim to shore.
- September 30 – An immigration judge rules Salah Sarsour can be deported.

=== October ===
- October 13 – Six people are killed in a plane crash near Wisconsin Dells.
- October 28 – The Milwaukee Brewers win the 2026 World Series in game 5, beating the Tampa Bay Rays 4–1. It is the team's first World Series title.

=== November ===
- November 3 – 2026 Wisconsin elections:
  - 2026 Wisconsin State Assembly election: The Democratic Party gained eight seats, winning control of the Assembly. Greta Neubauer was selected as Speaker-designate, becoming the first woman chosen to lead the chamber.
  - 2026 Wisconsin Attorney General election: Incumbent Josh Kaul won reelection to a third term, defeating Republican Eric Toney.
  - 2026 Wisconsin gubernatorial election: David Crowley wins the election and beats incumbent Tom Tiffany. He is the first Black governor of Wisconsin. Sarah Godlewski becomes new lieutenant governor.
  - 2026 Wisconsin Secretary of State election: JoCasta Zamarripa wins election. She becomes first Latina to win statewide office in Wisconsin.
  - 2026 Wisconsin Senate election: The Democratic Party gained three seats, securing an 18–15 majority and control of the Senate.
  - 2026 Wisconsin State Treasurer election: Yee Leng Xiong wins election. He becomes first Hmong-American elected to statewide office.
  - 2026 United States House of Representatives elections in Wisconsin: Mitchell Berman won District 1, and Rebecca Cooke won District 3, flipping both seats from Republican to Democratic control. The delegation became evenly split, 4–4.

== See also ==
- 2026 in the United States
