= 2027 in Wisconsin =

- Decades: 2000s; 2010s; 2020s
- See also: History of Wisconsin; Historical outline of Wisconsin; List of years in Wisconsin; 2027 in the United States

The following is a list of events of the year 2027 in Wisconsin.

== Events ==
=== Predicted or scheduled ===
- January 4 - The 108th Wisconsin Legislature will convene
- April 6 -
  - 2027 Wisconsin Supreme Court election
  - Other 2027 elections in Wisconsin
