= 2023 in Wisconsin =

- Decades: 2000s; 2010s; 2020s
- See also: History of Wisconsin; Historical outline of Wisconsin; List of years in Wisconsin; 2023 in the United States

== Incumbents ==
- Governor: Tony Evers (D)
- Lieutenant governor: Mandela Barnes (D) (until January 3), Sara Rodriguez (D) (starting January 3)
- Attorney general: Josh Kaul
- Secretary of State: Doug La Follette (until March 17), Sarah Godlewski (starting March 17)
- Treasurer: Sarah Godlewski (until January 3), John Leiber (starting January 3)

== Events ==
- February 7 - Milwaukee police officer Peter E. Jerving was shot and killed trying to arrest a robbery suspect.
- February 23 - A parking garage in the Bayshore shopping center collapses.
- March 27 - Five people were shot and injured outside a restaurant in Milwaukee.
- April 8 - Two officers were killed conducting a traffic stop in Barron County.
- June 19 - Six teenagers were shot during Milwaukee's Juneteenth celebration.
- September 22 - Pink flamingos were spotted at Port Washington beach, being the first known sighting of American flamingos in Wisconsin.
- November 18 - Taylor Swift hosts a concert in Green Bay in the EPIC Event Center.

== See also ==
- 2023 in the United States
