= 2022 Wisconsin State Treasurer election =

- November 8, 2022

Nominee	John Leiber	Aaron Richardson
Party	Republican	Democratic
Popular vote	1,293,553	1,254,949
Percentage	49.62%	48.14%
- Leiber: 40–50% 50–60% 60–70% 70–80% 80–90% >90% Richardson: 40–50% 50–60% 60–70% 70–80% 80–90% >90% Tie: 40–50% 50% No data
Treasurer before election
Sarah Godlewski
Democratic
Elected Treasurer
John Leiber
Republican

The 2022 Wisconsin State Treasurer election took place on November 8, 2022, to elect the next state treasurer of Wisconsin. Incumbent Democratic Party Treasurer Sarah Godlewski chose not to seek re-election, instead unsuccessfully running for US Senate.

Republican John Leiber narrowly defeated Democrat Aaron Richardson in the general election. This was the only Wisconsin Executive office Republicans won in 2022.

== Democratic primary ==
=== Candidates ===
==== Nominee ====
- Aaron Richardson, mayor of Fitchburg

==== Eliminated in primary ====
- Gillian Battino, radiologist
- Angelito Tenorio, West Allis alderman

==== Did not file ====
- Dawn Marie Sass, Green County supervisor and former State Treasurer of Wisconsin (2007–2011)

==== Declined ====
- Sarah Godlewski, incumbent treasurer (ran for U.S. Senate)

=== Endorsements ===
Gillian Battino

Statewide officials

- Doug La Follette, Secretary of State of Wisconsin
Angelito Tenorio

State senators

- Tim Carpenter, state senator from the 3rd district
- Dave Hansen, former state senator from the 30th district (2001–2021)
- LaTonya Johnson, state senator from the 6th district
- Chris Larson, state senator from the 7th district

State assemblymembers

- Samba Baldeh, state assemblyman from the 48th district
- Jonathan Brostoff, state assemblyman from the 19th district
- Jodi Emerson, state assemblywoman from the 91st district
- Evan Goyke, state assemblyman from the 18th district
- Francesca Hong, state assemblywoman from the 76th district
- Tip McGuire, state assemblyman from the 64th district
- Greta Neubauer, minority leader of the Wisconsin State Assembly
- Tod Ohnstad, state assemblyman from the 65th district
- Daniel Riemer, state assemblyman from the 7th district
- Kristina Shelton, state assemblywoman from the 90th district
- Christine Sinicki, state assemblywoman from the 20th district
- Mark Spreitzer, state assemblyman from the 45th district
- Amanda Stuck, former state assemblywoman from the 57th district (2015–2021)
- Lisa Subeck, state assemblywoman from the 78th district
- Robyn Vining, state assemblywoman from the 14th district

County officials

- Yogesh Chawla, Dane County county supervisor
- George Christenson, Milwaukee County county clerk
- Ryan Clancy, Milwaukee County county supervisor
- David Crowley, Milwaukee County Executive
- Michele Doolan, Dane County county supervisor
- Chuck Erickson, Dane County county supervisor
- Jason Haas, Milwaukee County county supervisor
- Holly Hatcher, Dane County county supervisor
- Alex Joers, Dane County county supervisor
- Richard Kimler, former Dane County county supervisor
- Shawn Rolland, Milwaukee County county supervisor
- Heidi Wegleitner, Dane County county supervisor
- John Weishan, Milwaukee County county supervisor
- Yee Leng Xiong, Marathon County county supervisor

Mayors

- Erik Brooks, former South Milwaukee mayor
- Dan Devine, West Allis mayor
- Cavalier Johnson, Milwaukee mayor
- Bryan Kennedy, Glendale mayor
- Katie Rosenberg, Wausau mayor
- Mike Wiza, Stevens Point mayor

City councilmembers

- Kate Beaton, Eau Claire councilmember
- Tom Lajsic, West Allis city council president
- JoCasta Zamarripa, member of the Milwaukee Common Council

Aldermembers

- Julia Arrata-Fratta, Fitchburg alderwoman
- Gabriella Gerhardt, Fitchburg alderwoman
- Suzzette Grisham, West Allis alderwoman
- Kevin Haass, West Allis alderman
- Michael Hallquist, Brookfield alderman
- Danna Kuehn, West Allis alderwoman
- Joe Maldonado, Fitchburg alderman

Organizations

- Wisconsin Working Families Party

=== Polling ===
Poll source	Date(s) administered	Sample size (Note: Key: A – all adults RV – registered voters LV – likely voters V – unclear)	Margin of error	Gillian Battino	Aaron Richardson	Angelito Tenorio	Undecided
Change Research (D) (Note: This poll was sponsored by 314 Action Fund, which supports Battino for state treasurer)	July 1–7, 2022	560 (LV)	± 4.6%	7%	6%	6%	75%

=== Results ===
Richardson: 30-40%; 40–50%; 50–60%; Battino: 30-40%; 40–50%

Democratic primary results
Party	Candidate	Votes	%
Democratic	Aaron Richardson	168,905	38.40%
Democratic	Gillian Battino	159,902	36.36%
Democratic	Angelito Tenorio	111,012	25.24%
Total votes		439,819	100.0%

== Republican primary ==
=== Candidates ===
==== Nominee ====
- John Leiber, attorney

==== Eliminated in primary ====
- Orlando Owens, activist and pastor

=== Endorsements ===
Orlando Owens

Organizations

- Republican Party of Wisconsin

=== Results ===
Republican primary results
Party	Candidate	Votes	%
Republican	John Leiber	357,384	65.76%
Republican	Orlando Owens	186,084	34.24%
Total votes		543,468	100.0%

== Constitution Party primary ==
=== Candidates ===
==== Nominee ====
- Andrew Zuelke, chairman of the Wisconsin Constitution Party

=== Results ===
Constitution Party primary results
Party	Candidate	Votes	%
Constitution	Andrew Zuelke	230	100.0%
Total votes		230	100.0%

== General election ==
=== Results ===
2022 Wisconsin State Treasurer election
Party	Candidate	Votes	%	±%
Republican	John Leiber	1,293,553	49.62%	+2.85%
Democratic	Aaron Richardson	1,254,949	48.14%	−2.75%
Constitution	Andrew Zuelke	57,333	2.20%	−0.09%
Write-in		1,268	0.05%	-0.01%
Total votes		2,607,103	100.00%	N/A
Republican gain from Democratic				

==== By county ====
County	Aaron Richardson Democratic		John Leiber Republican		Various candidates Other parties		Margin		Total votes cast
County	#	%	#	%	#	%	#	%	Total votes cast
Adams	3,570	36.37%	5,973	60.84%	274	2.79%	2,403	24.48%	9,817
Ashland	3,842	55.77%	2,882	41.83%	165	2.40%	−960	−13.94%	6,889
Barron	7,088	35.42%	12,493	62.43%	429	2.14%	5,405	27.01%	20,010
Bayfield	5,126	55.63%	3,924	42.59%	164	1.78%	−1,202	−13.05%	9,214
Brown	48,879	43.64%	60,249	53.79%	2,880	2.57%	11,370	10.15%	112,008
Buffalo	2,233	37.11%	3,622	60.20%	162	2.69%	1,389	23.08%	6,017
Burnett	2,790	34.16%	5,208	63.77%	169	2.07%	2,418	29.61%	8,167
Calumet	8,965	36.52%	14,993	61.08%	589	2.40%	6,028	24.56%	24,547
Chippewa	10,990	38.36%	16,882	58.93%	776	2.71%	5,892	20.57%	28,648
Clark	3,451	29.87%	7,749	67.06%	355	3.07%	4,298	37.20%	11,555
Columbia	12,756	47.63%	13,284	49.60%	742	2.77%	528	1.97%	26,782
Crawford	3,199	46.31%	3,542	51.27%	167	2.42%	343	4.97%	6,908
Dane	222,685	75.35%	67,812	22.95%	5,026	1.70%	−154,873	−52.41%	295,523
Dodge	12,115	31.68%	25,121	65.70%	1,001	2.62%	13,006	34.01%	38,237
Door	8,255	48.59%	8,422	49.57%	313	1.84%	167	0.98%	16,990
Douglas	10,119	54.77%	7,922	42.87%	436	2.36%	−2,197	−11.89%	18,477
Dunn	7,742	42.41%	10,054	55.08%	457	2.50%	2,312	12.67%	18,253
Eau Claire	26,029	54.56%	20,406	42.77%	1,274	2.67%	−5,623	−11.79%	47,709
Florence	605	24.26%	1,856	74.42%	33	1.32%	1,251	50.16%	2,494
Fond du Lac	15,019	33.03%	29,297	64.44%	1,149	2.53%	14,278	31.40%	45,465
Forest	1,339	32.81%	2,649	64.91%	93	2.28%	1,310	32.10%	4,081
Grant	8,314	42.17%	10,936	55.46%	467	2.37%	2,622	13.30%	19,717
Green	8,632	50.41%	8,001	46.72%	492	2.87%	−631	−3.68%	17,125
Green Lake	2,392	28.36%	5,784	68.58%	258	3.06%	3,392	40.22%	8,434
Iowa	6,314	55.24%	4,835	42.30%	281	2.46%	−1,479	−12.94%	11,430
Iron	1,210	37.39%	1,987	61.40%	39	1.21%	777	24.01%	3,236
Jackson	3,267	41.48%	4,367	55.45%	242	3.07%	1,100	13.97%	7,876
Jefferson	15,318	40.29%	21,706	57.09%	996	2.62%	6,388	16.80%	38,020
Juneau	3,717	34.78%	6,656	62.28%	315	2.95%	2,939	27.50%	10,688
Kenosha	30,260	46.55%	33,360	51.32%	1,383	2.13%	3,100	4.77%	65,003
Kewaunee	3,215	32.98%	6,279	64.41%	254	2.61%	3,064	31.43%	9,748
La Crosse	29,333	54.24%	23,263	43.01%	1,488	2.75%	−6,070	−11.22%	54,084
Lafayette	2,702	41.87%	3,614	56.00%	138	2.14%	912	14.13%	6,454
Langlade	2,733	30.75%	5,921	66.62%	234	2.63%	3,188	35.87%	8,888
Lincoln	4,775	35.98%	8,144	61.36%	354	2.67%	3,369	25.38%	13,273
Manitowoc	12,788	36.24%	21,521	60.98%	982	2.78%	8,733	24.75%	35,291
Marathon	22,967	37.86%	36,143	59.59%	1,545	2.55%	13,176	21.72%	60,655
Marinette	5,593	30.61%	12,215	66.86%	461	2.52%	6,622	36.25%	18,269
Marquette	2,426	33.60%	4,564	63.21%	230	3.19%	2,138	29.61%	7,220
Menominee	875	74.34%	270	22.94%	32	2.72%	−605	−51.40%	1,177
Milwaukee	232,370	68.50%	100,787	29.71%	6,045	1.78%	−131,583	−38.79%	339,202
Monroe	6,355	37.09%	10,268	59.93%	510	2.98%	3,913	22.84%	17,133
Oconto	5,373	27.91%	13,370	69.46%	505	2.62%	7,997	41.55%	19,248
Oneida	7,978	40.04%	11,460	57.51%	489	2.45%	3,482	17.47%	19,927
Outagamie	35,768	42.39%	46,313	54.89%	2,291	2.72%	10,545	12.50%	84,372
Ozaukee	20,738	40.26%	29,926	58.10%	845	1.64%	9,188	17.84%	51,509
Pepin	1,202	36.75%	2,002	61.20%	67	2.05%	800	24.46%	3,271
Pierce	7,531	41.93%	9,965	55.48%	466	2.59%	2,434	13.55%	17,962
Polk	7,124	35.04%	12,696	62.44%	513	2.52%	5,572	27.40%	20,333
Portage	16,765	50.68%	15,447	46.70%	868	2.62%	−1,318	−3.98%	33,080
Price	2,440	35.10%	4,335	62.37%	176	2.53%	1,895	27.26%	6,951
Racine	35,643	44.37%	43,005	53.54%	1,680	2.09%	7,362	9.16%	80,328
Richland	3,075	44.60%	3,658	53.05%	162	2.35%	583	8.46%	6,895
Rock	34,556	53.96%	27,571	43.05%	1,917	2.99%	−6,985	−10.91%	64,044
Rusk	2,028	32.00%	4,147	65.43%	163	2.57%	2,119	33.43%	6,338
Sauk	14,022	49.05%	13,838	48.41%	726	2.54%	−184	−0.64%	28,586
Sawyer	3,488	41.13%	4,876	57.49%	117	1.38%	1,388	16.37%	8,481
Shawano	5,311	29.98%	11,997	67.73%	405	2.29%	6,686	37.75%	17,713
Sheboygan	20,339	38.74%	30,895	58.85%	1,264	2.41%	10,556	20.11%	52,498
St. Croix	17,135	39.19%	25,501	58.32%	1,091	2.50%	8,366	19.13%	43,727
Taylor	2,097	24.46%	6,237	72.75%	239	2.79%	4,140	48.29%	8,573
Trempealeau	4,819	39.99%	6,908	57.32%	324	2.69%	2,089	17.33%	12,051
Vernon	6,092	46.89%	6,519	50.18%	380	2.93%	427	3.29%	12,991
Vilas	4,663	35.78%	8,156	62.59%	212	1.63%	3,493	26.81%	13,031
Walworth	16,706	36.92%	27,516	60.81%	1,026	2.27%	10,810	23.89%	45,248
Washburn	3,014	36.38%	5,092	61.46%	179	2.16%	2,078	25.08%	8,285
Washington	20,307	27.96%	50,928	70.12%	1,391	1.92%	30,621	42.16%	72,626
Waukesha	78,005	35.68%	136,992	62.67%	3,599	1.65%	58,987	26.98%	218,596
Waupaca	7,376	32.15%	14,985	65.31%	582	2.54%	7,609	33.16%	22,943
Waushara	3,390	30.46%	7,365	66.17%	376	3.38%	3,975	35.71%	11,131
Winnebago	32,965	45.15%	37,843	51.83%	2,208	3.02%	4,878	6.68%	73,016
Wood	12,646	38.75%	19,049	58.37%	940	2.88%	6,403	19.62%	32,635
Totals	1,254,949	48.14%	1,293,553	49.62%	58,601	2.25%	38,604	1.48%	2,607,103

Counties that flipped from Democratic to Republican

- Columbia (largest city: Portage)
- Crawford (largest city: Prairie du Chien)
- Door (largest city: Sturgeon Bay)
- Jackson (largest city: Black River Falls)
- Kenosha (largest city: Kenosha)
- Richland (largest city: Richland Center)
- Vernon (largest city: Viroqua)
- Winnebago (largest city: Oshkosh)

==== By congressional district ====
Leiber won six of eight congressional districts.

District	Richardson	Leiber	Representative
1st	46%	51%	Bryan Steil
2nd	70%	28%	Mark Pocan
3rd	46%	51%	Ron Kind (117th Congress)
3rd	46%	51%	Derrick Van Orden (118th Congress)
4th	75%	23%	Gwen Moore
5th	35%	63%	Scott L. Fitzgerald
6th	39%	58%	Glenn Grothman
7th	38%	60%	Tom Tiffany
8th	40%	58%	Mike Gallagher

== Notes ==
Partisan clients
