= 2024 in Wisconsin =

- Decades: 2000s; 2010s; 2020s
- See also: History of Wisconsin; Historical outline of Wisconsin; List of years in Wisconsin; 2024 in the United States

The following is a list of events of the year 2024 in Wisconsin.

== Incumbents ==
=== State government ===
- Governor: Tony Evers (D)
- Lieutenant governor: Sara Rodriguez (D)
- Attorney general: Josh Kaul
- Secretary of State: Sarah Godlewski
- Treasurer: John Leiber

== Events ==
- March 9 – Nine people are killed and one is injured after a van crashes into a semi truck in Dewhurst.
- April 2 –
  - 2024 Wisconsin Republican presidential primary
  - 2024 Wisconsin Democratic presidential primary
- May 1 – A student is fatally shot by police officers outside Mount Horeb Middle School in Mount Horeb, after the police received reports of someone carrying a weapon.
- November 5 – 2024 United States presidential election in Wisconsin
- December 16 – Abundant Life Christian School shooting: Multiple casualties are reported in a mass shooting at the Abundant Life Christian School in Madison.

== See also ==
- 2024 in the United States
