= 2025 in Wisconsin =

- Decades: 2000s; 2010s; 2020s
- See also: History of Wisconsin; Historical outline of Wisconsin; List of years in Wisconsin; 2025 in the United States

The following is a list of events of the year 2025 in Wisconsin.

== Incumbents ==
=== State government ===
- Governor: Tony Evers (D)
- Lieutenant governor: Sara Rodriguez (D)
- Attorney general: Josh Kaul (D)
- Secretary of State: Sarah Godlewski (D)
- Treasurer: John Leiber (R)

== Events ==
- March 23 – Wisconsin beats Ohio State 4–3 in overtime to win the 2025 NCAA Division I women's ice hockey tournament.
- April 1 –
  - 2025 Wisconsin elections
  - 2025 Wisconsin Superintendent of Public Instruction election
  - 2025 Wisconsin Supreme Court election
- April 24–26 – The 2025 NFL Draft is held at Lambeau Field in Green Bay.
- April 25 – Milwaukee County Judge Hannah Dugan is arrested by the Federal Bureau of Investigation for allegedly helping an illegal immigrant evade arrest the previous day.
- May 11 – Four people are killed and four injured after an apartment fire in Milwaukee.
- May 29–June 1 – The 2025 U.S. Women's Open is played at Erin Hills in Erin.
- July 2 – The Wisconsin Supreme Court strikes down an 1849 law banning abortions in the state.
- August 9-10 – Flash floods strike parts of Wisconsin, resulting in the cancellation of the final day of the Wisconsin State Fair in West Allis.
- November 23 – Morgan Geyser, who at age 12 stabbed and attempted to kill a 12-year-old girl alongside another 12-year-old, is reported missing from a group home in Madison. It is determined Geyser cut off a monitoring bracelet and fled with an acquaintance; they are located in Posen, Illinois the following day.
- December 23 – Hannah Dugan is convicted of felony obstruction.

== See also ==
- 2025 in the United States
