= MMSD =

MMSD may refer to:

- Los Cabos International Airport, Mexico
- Milwaukee Metropolitan Sewerage District
- Madison Metropolitan School District
- Madison Metropolitan Sewerage District – see List of Superfund sites in Wisconsin
