= 2018 Wisconsin State Treasurer election =

2018 Wisconsin State Treasurer Election
- November 6, 2018
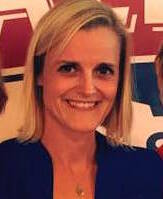

Candidate	Sarah Godlewski	Travis Hartwig
Party	Democratic	Republican
Popular vote	1,324,110	1,216,811
Percentage	50.89%	46.77%
- Godlewski: 40–50% 50–60% 60–70% 70–80% Hartwig: 40–50% 50–60% 60–70% 70–80%
Treasurer before election
Matt Adamczyk
Republican
Elected Treasurer
Sarah Godlewski
Democratic

The 2018 Wisconsin State Treasurer election was held on November 6, 2018, and saw Democratic nominee Sarah Godlewski defeat Republican nominee Travis Hartwig. Incumbent Republican Matt Adamczyk, first elected in 2014, did not sought re-election.

Earlier in the year, a referendum had been held on whether or not to abolish the State Treasurer office, a move that Wisconsin voters rejected by a margin of more than 20 percent. Incumbent Republican Matt Adamczyk, first elected in 2014, chose not to run for reelection.

== Primaries ==
=== Democratic ===
Sarah Godlewski defeated Dawn Marie Sass, former state treasurer, and Cynthia Kaump in the Democratic primary.

2018 Wisconsin State Treasurer Democratic primary
Party	Candidate	Votes	%
Democratic	Sarah Godlewski	201,031	43.46
Democratic	Dawn Marie Sass	148,362	32.07
Democratic	Cynthia Kaump	112,255	24.27
Write-in		965	0.21
Total votes		462,613	100

=== Republican ===
2018 Wisconsin State Treasurer Republican primary
Party	Candidate	Votes	%
Republican	Travis Hartwig	261,139	72.12
Republican	Jill Millies	100,153	27.66
Write-in		793	0.22
Total votes		362,085	100

=== Constitution ===
2018 Wisconsin State Treasurer Constitution primary
Party	Candidate	Votes	%
Constitution	Andrew Zuelke	350	97.72
Write-in		10	2.78
Total votes		310	100

== General election ==
=== Results ===
2018 Wisconsin State Treasurer election
Party	Candidate	Votes	%
Democratic	Sarah Godlewski	1,324,110	50.89%
Republican	Travis Hartwig	1,216,811	46.77%
Constitution	Andrew Zuelke	59,570	2.29%
Write-in		1,471	0.06%
Total votes		2,601,962	100.00%
Democratic gain from Republican			

==== By congressional district ====
Despite losing the state, Hartwig won five of eight congressional districts.

District	Godlewski	Hartwig	Representative
1st	46%	52%	Paul Ryan
2nd	69%	28%	Mark Pocan
3rd	51%	46%	Ron Kind
4th	76%	22%	Gwen Moore
5th	39%	59%	Jim Sensenbrenner
6th	42%	55%	Glenn Grothman
7th	43%	55%	Sean Duffy
8th	43%	54%	Mike Gallagher
