= Angelito Tenorio =

21st century American politician

Member of the Wisconsin State Assembly from the 14th district
- Incumbent
- Assumed office January 6, 2025
- Preceded by: Robyn Vining

Member of the West Allis Common Council from the 1st District
- In office May 4, 2020 – October 31, 2022 Serving with Vincent Vitale
- Preceded by: David Czaplewski
- Succeeded by: Ray C. Turner

Personal details
- Born: June 30, 1996 (age 30) Milwaukee, Wisconsin, U.S.
- Party: Democratic
- Education: University of Wisconsin–Madison
- Occupation: Organizer, teacher
- Website: Campaign website

Military service
- Allegiance: United States
- Branch/service: Wisconsin Army National Guard
- Years of service: 2015–2018

Angelito Tenorio (born June 30, 1996) is a Filipino American campaign organizer, educator, and Democratic politician from West Allis, Wisconsin. He is a member of the Wisconsin State Assembly, representing Wisconsin's 14th Assembly district since 2025. He previously served as a member of the West Allis City Council.

== Early life and education ==
Angelito Tenorio was born in Milwaukee, Wisconsin, in 1996. He was raised, educated, and lived most of his life in the Milwaukee suburb of West Allis, Wisconsin. He graduated from Marquette University High School in 2014, and went on to attend the University of Wisconsin–Madison. He graduated early, earning his bachelor's degree in political science and government in 2017. While attending college, he also enlisted in the Wisconsin Army National Guard, and served from 2015 to 2018.

== Political career ==
Tenorio made his first bid for elected office in 2016, while still attending college in Madison. He sought a seat on the Board of Supervisors of Dane County, Wisconsin. He ran in the 5th County board district, which then comprised most of the University of Wisconsin campus. He lost the election to recent UW graduate Hayley Young.

After college, Tenorio took a short-term fellowship in the office of U.S. representative Karen Bass (D–CA), then returned to the Milwaukee area to work. In 2018, he joined the campaign staff of Tom Palzewicz, who was running for election to Congress in Wisconsin's 5th congressional district. After the election, Tenorio went to work for the Wisconsin League of Conservation Voters.

In 2019, Tenorio launched another bid for elected office, running for a seat on the West Allis City Council. Tenorio won a seat in the April 2020 election, and served two years on the City Council, representing the 1st district alongside Vincent Vitale.

Shortly after winning his election, he became active in the 2020 United States presidential election as a co-chair of Wisconsin Asian American Pacific Islanders for Joe Biden, and simultaneously became chair of the Democratic Party of Wisconsin Asian American Pacific Islander Caucus.

In April 2021, incumbent Wisconsin State Treasurer Sarah Godlewski announced she would seek the Democratic nomination for U.S. Senate in 2022, and would therefore not run for re-election as Treasurer. Tenorio announced in July 2021 that he would seek the Democratic nomination to succeed Godlewski as Treasurer. Later that year, Tenorio marched in the Waukesha, Wisconsin, parade just before a driver intentionally drove his car into the parade crowd killing six people. Ultimately two other candidates entered the Democratic race for state treasurer, Fitchburg mayor Aaron Richardson and physician Gillian Battino. Tenorio came in 3rd place in the primary, receiving 25% of the vote.

After the 2022 primary, Tenorio resigned from the City Council and moved to Connecticut with his partner to pursue his master's degree at Fairfield University. While there, he took a job with the Boys & Girls Clubs of Hartford, Connecticut, then served briefly as development director for the New Leaders Council from June 2023 to October 2023. At that time, he took a job as a paraprofessional teacher for Hamden Public Schools in Hamden, Connecticut.

He returned to the Milwaukee area in the spring of 2024, going to work as a teacher at Tiny Green Trees, a nature-based childcare program. Almost as soon as he returned to West Allis, he returned to politics, entering the race for Wisconsin State Assembly in the 14th Assembly district. The 14th Assembly district had been significantly reshaped by the 2024 redistricting act, which had replaced the decade-old Republican legislative gerrymander. Previously, the district had packed the most Democratic wards of Wauwatosa and West Allis into a single snake-shaped district, running from northwest Wauwatosa to southeast West Allis. The new district instead shifted into West Allis, comprising nearly the entire city along with a parts of western Milwaukee. The previous 14th district incumbent, Robyn Vining, was drawn out of the district, leaving an open seat. Ultimately two other candidates sought the Democratic nomination in the new Democratic-leaning seat: union leader Nathan Kieso of West Allis and youth organizer Brady Coulthard of Milwaukee. Tenorio won the primary, finishing 214 votes ahead of Kieso. He went on to win the general election by a healthy margin, defeating perennial candidates Jim Engstrand and Steven Shevey. Tenorio took office in the Assembly in January 2025.

In the fall of 2024, Tenorio also began working as a teaching assistant at the University of Wisconsin–Madison.

== Personal life and family ==
Angelito Tenorio is the son of two Filipino American immigrants. Both of his parents were union letter carriers for the United States Postal Service.

== Electoral history ==
=== Dane County Board (2016) ===
Year	Election	Date	Elected				Defeated				Total	Plurality
2016	General	Apr. 5	Hayley Young	Nonpartisan	2,908	61.99%	Angelito Tenorio	Non.	1,723	36.73%	4,691	1,185

=== West Allis Common Council (2020) ===
Year	Election	Date	Elected				Defeated				Total	Plurality
2020	General	Apr. 7	Angelito Tenorio	Nonpartisan	1,028	33.82%	Peggy Wittman	Non.	585	19.24%	3,040	7
2020	General	Apr. 7	Vincent Vitale	Nonpartisan	1,021	33.59%	David Race	Non.	392	12.89%	3,040	7

=== Wisconsin Treasurer (2022) ===
Year	Election	Date	Elected				Defeated				Total	Plurality
2022	Primary	Aug. 9	Aaron Richardson	Democratic	168,905	38.34%	Gillian M. Battino	Dem.	159,902	36.30%	440,525	9,003
2022	Primary	Aug. 9	Aaron Richardson	Democratic	168,905	38.34%	Angelito Tenorio	Dem.	111,012	25.20%	440,525	9,003

=== Wisconsin Assembly (2024) ===
Year	Election	Date	Elected				Defeated				Total	Plurality
2024	Primary	Aug. 13	Angelito Tenorio	Democratic	2,220	37.20%	Nathan R. Kieso	Dem.	2,006	33.62%	5,967	214
2024	Primary	Aug. 13	Angelito Tenorio	Democratic	2,220	37.20%	Brady Coulthard	Dem.	1,731	29.01%	5,967	214
2024	General	Nov. 5	Angelito Tenorio	Democratic	15,637	52.66%	Jim Engstrand	Rep.	12,896	43.43%	29,693	2,741
2024	General	Nov. 5	Angelito Tenorio	Democratic	15,637	52.66%	Steven Shevey	Ind.	1,117	3.76%	29,693	2,741

Wisconsin State Assembly
Preceded by Robyn Vining	Member of the Wisconsin State Assembly from the 14th district January 6, 2025 – present	Incumbent
