= 2026 Wisconsin Secretary of State election =

American election

- November 3, 2026
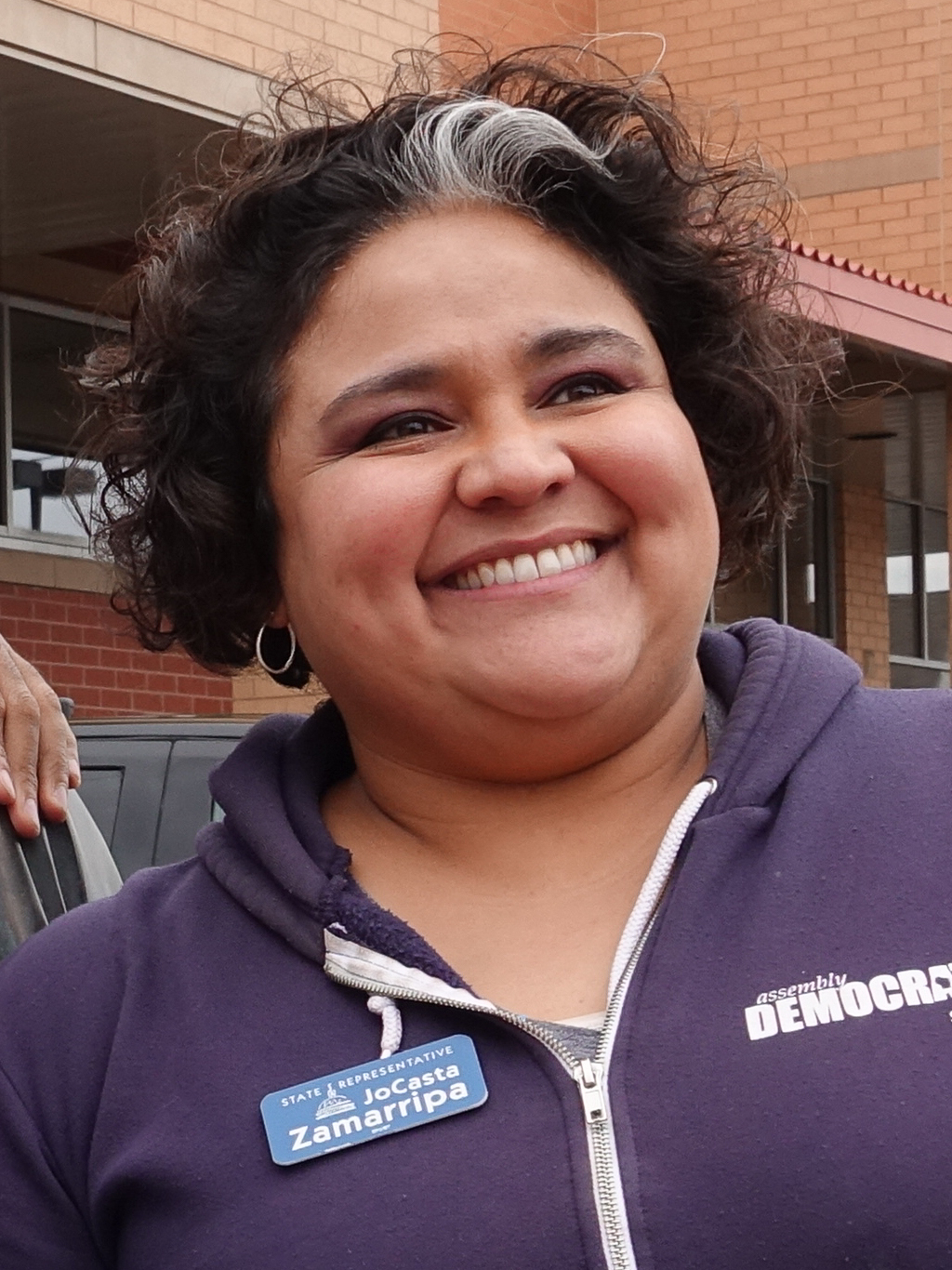

Nominee	JoCasta Zamarripa	Jay Schroeder
Party	Democratic	Republican
Popular vote	1,337,696	1,205,487
Percentage	50.58%	45.61%
- Zamarripa: 40–50% 50–60% 70–80% Schroeder: 40–50% 50–60% 60–70% 70–80%
Secretary of State before election
Sarah Godlewski
Democratic
Elected Secretary of State
JoCasta Zamarripa
Democratic

The 2026 Wisconsin Secretary of State election was held on November 3, 2026, to elect the Secretary of State of Wisconsin. Incumbent Democratic Secretary of State Sarah Godlewski was eligible to run for election to a full term but declined to do so. This was one of four Democratic-held secretaries of state up for election in 2026 in a state won by Donald Trump in the 2024 presidential election and the state with the closest presidential margin of victory at R+0.9.

This was the first Wisconsin secretary of state election since 1978 in which the incumbent did not seek re-election.

== Democratic primary ==
=== Candidates ===
==== Nominee ====
- JoCasta Zamarripa, Milwaukee common councilor from the 8th district (2020–present)

==== Disqualified ====
- Eileen Newcomer, former deputy director for the League of Women Voters of Wisconsin

==== Withdrawn ====
- Collin McNamara, activist and nominee for Wisconsin's 24th Senate district in 2024

==== Declined ====
- Sarah Godlewski, incumbent Secretary of State (2023–present) (running for lieutenant governor)

=== Endorsements ===
JoCasta Zamarripa

U.S. senators

- Tammy Baldwin, Wisconsin (2013–present)

U.S. representatives

- Mark Pocan, U.S. representative from Wisconsin's 2nd congressional district (2013–present)

Statewide officials

- Peter Barca, former secretary of the Wisconsin Department of Revenue (2019–2024)

State legislators

- Clinton Anderson, state assemblymember from the 45th district (2023–present)
- Margaret Arney, state assemblymember from the 18th district (2025–present)
- Tim Carpenter, state assemblymember from the 3rd district (2003–present)
- Chris Danou, former state representative from the 92nd district (2009–2017)
- Ben DeSmidt, state assemblymember from the 65th district (2025–present)
- Steve Doyle, state assemblymember from the 94th district (2011–present)
- Evan Goyke, former state assemblymember from the 18th district (2013–2025) and Milwaukee City Attorney (2024–present)
- Jodi Habush Sinykin, state senator from the 8th district (2025–present)
- Tara Johnson, state assemblymember from the 96th district (2025–present)
- Andy Jorgensen, former state assemblymember from the 43rd district (2007–2017)
- Nick Milroy, former state assemblymember from the 73rd district (2009–2023)
- Priscilla Prado, state assemblymember from the 9th district (2025–present)
- Daniel Riemer, former state assemblymember from the 7th district (2013–2025)
- Christine Sinicki, state assemblymember from the 20th district (1999–present)
- Mark Spreitzer, state senator from the 15th district (2023–present)
- Amanda Stuck, former state assemblymember from the 57th district (2015–2021)
- Lisa Subeck, state assemblymember from the 79th district (2015–present)

Local officials

- Gordon Hintz, Winnebago County Executive (2025–present)

Labor unions

- Wisconsin AFL-CIO

Organizations

- Fair Wisconsin
- Freedom from Religion Foundation
- Latino Victory
- LGBTQ Victory Fund
- Vote Run Lead
- Wisconsin Working Families Party

=== Results ===
Democratic primary results
Party	Candidate	Votes	%
Democratic	JoCasta Zamarripa	641,609	99.6
Write-in		2,344	0.4
Total votes		643,753	100.0

== Republican primary ==
=== Candidates ===
==== Nominee ====
- Jay Schroeder, businessman and nominee for this office in 2018

==== Eliminated in primary ====
- Brayden Myer, small business owner
- Nate Pollnow, beef farmer and auctioneer
- Cindy Werner, businesswoman and perennial candidate

=== Endorsements ===
Nate Pollnow

State legislators

- Elijah Behnke, state assemblymember from the 6th district (2021–present)
- Mark Born, state assemblymember from the 37th district (2013–present)
- Alex Dallman, state assemblymember from the 39th district (2021–present)
- Barbara Dittrich, state assemblymember from the 99th district (2019–present)
- Bob Donovan, state assemblymember from the 61st district (2023–present)
- Chanz Green, state assemblymember from the 74th district (2023–present)
- Rick Gundrum, state assemblymember from the 58th district (2018–present)
- John Jagler, state senator from the 13th district (2021–present)
- Scott Krug, state assemblymember from the 72nd district (2011–present)
- Dave Maxey, state assemblymember from the 83rd district (2023–present)
- William Penterman, state assemblymember from the 38th district (2021–present)
- Romaine Quinn, state senator from the 25th district (2023–present)
- Patrick Testin, President pro tempore of the Wisconsin State Senate (2021–present) from the 24th district (2017–present)
- Cory Tomczyk, state senator from the 29th district (2023–present)
- Travis Tranel, state assemblymember from the 49th district (2011–present)
- Duke Tucker, state assemblymember from the 75th district (2025–present)
- Ron Tusler, state assemblymember from the 3rd district (2017–present)
- Robert Wittke, state assemblymember from the 63rd district (2019–present)

Organizations

- Republican Party of Wisconsin

=== Results ===
Primary results by county: Schroeder: 40–50%; 50–60%

Primary results by precinct: Schroeder: 20–30%; 30–40%; 40–50%; 50–60%; 60–70%; 70–80%; 80–90%; >90%; Pollnow: 20–30%; 30–40%; 40–50%; 50–60%; 60–70%; 70–80%; >90%; Werner: 30–40%; 40–50%; 50–60%; 60–70%; >90%; Myer: 30–40%; 40–50%; 50–60%; 60–70%; >90%; Tie: 20–30%; 30–40%; 40–50%; 50%; No Votes

Republican primary results
Party	Candidate	Votes	%
Republican	Jay Schroeder	201,187	47.2
Republican	Nate Pollnow	108,792	25.5
Republican	Cindy Werner	61,619	14.4
Republican	Brayden Myer	54,112	12.7
Write-in		1,002	0.2
Total votes		426,712	100.0

== Green primary ==
=== Candidates ===
==== Nominee ====
- Pete Karas, candidate recruiter for the Wisconsin Green Party

=== Endorsements ===
Pete Karas

Political parties

- Pirate Party
- Transhumanist Party
- Wisconsin Green Party

== General election ==
=== Predictions ===
Source	Ranking	As of
Sabato's Crystal Ball	Lean D	September 9, 2026

=== Post-primary endorsements ===
JoCasta Zamarripa (D)

Organizations

- Citizen Action of Wisconsin
- Everytown for Gun Safety
- Fair Wisconsin
- Planned Parenthood

Labor unions

- AFSCME Council 32
- AFT-Wisconsin
- Service Employees International Union Wisconsin
- United Auto Workers
- Wisconsin AFL-CIO

Newspapers

- The Badger Herald
- The Capital Times
- Milwaukee Courier
- The Shepherd Express

=== Results ===
2026 Wisconsin Secretary of State election
Party	Candidate	Votes	%	±%
Democratic	JoCasta Zamarripa	1,337,696	50.58%	
Republican	Jay Schroeder	1,205,487	45.61%	
Green	Pete Karas			
Write-in				
Total votes			100.0%	
