= 2026 Wisconsin State Treasurer election =

- November 3, 2026

Nominee	Yee Leng Xiong	John Leiber
Party	Democratic	Republican
Popular vote	1,362,292	1,268,099
Percentage	51.8%	48.2%
Treasurer before election
John Leiber
Republican
Elected Treasurer
Yee Leng Xiong
Democratic

The 2026 Wisconsin State Treasurer election was held on November 3, 2026, to elect the state treasurer of Wisconsin. Democratic county advisor Yee Leng Xiong defeated Republican incumbent John Leiber.

== Republican primary ==
=== Candidates ===
==== Nominee ====
- John Leiber, incumbent state treasurer

=== Endorsements ===
John Leiber

Organizations

- Republican Party of Wisconsin

=== Results ===
Republican primary results
Party	Candidate	Votes	%
Republican	John Leiber (incumbent)	414,940	99.8
Write-in		1,055	0.2
Total votes		415,995	100.0

== Democratic primary ==
=== Candidates ===
==== Nominee ====
- Yee Leng Xiong, Marathon County supervisor and nominee for Wisconsin's 85th Assembly district in 2024

==== Eliminated in primary ====
- Dylan Helmenstine, Black Earth school board member

==== Withdrawn ====
- Eric Wilson, project manager and candidate for Wisconsin's 3rd congressional district in 2024

=== Endorsements ===
Dylan Helmenstine

U.S. representatives

- Mark Pocan, WI-02 (2013–present) (previously endorsed Wilson)

State legislators

- Dianne Hesselbein, SD-27 (2023–present)
- Alex Joers, AD-81 (2025–present)
- Tim Carpenter, SD-3 (2003–present)

Organizations

- Citizen Action of Wisconsin (co-endorsement with Xiong)
- Fair Wisconsin
- Our Wisconsin Revolution
Yee Leng Xiong

U.S. senators

- Tammy Baldwin, Wisconsin (2013–present)

Statewide officials

- Barbara Lawton, former lieutenant governor of Wisconsin (2003–2011)

State legislators

- Brienne Brown, AD-43 (2025–present)
- Jodi Emerson, AD-91 (2019–present)
- Andrew Hysell, AD-48 (2025–present)
- Tara Johnson, AD-96 (2025–present)
- Lori Palmeri, AD-54 (2023–present)
- Christine Sinicki, AD-20 (1999–present)

Municipal officials

- Tom Nelson, Outagamie County executive (2011-present)

Labor unions

- Milwaukee Area Labor Council (AFL-CIO)

Organizations

- Citizen Action of Wisconsin (co-endorsement with Helmenstine)
Eric Wilson (withdrawn)

U.S. representatives

- Mark Pocan, WI-02 (2013–present)

=== Polling ===
Poll source	Date(s) administered	Sample size (Note: Key: A – all adults RV – registered voters LV – likely voters V – unclear)	Margin of error	Dylan Helmenstine	Yee Leng Xiong	Undecided
State Navigate	August 3–6, 2026	1,473 (LV)	± 2.3%	18% (Note: With voters who lean towards a given candidate)	28%	52%
State Navigate	August 3–6, 2026	1,473 (LV)	± 2.3%	14%	23%	63%
State Navigate (Note: Poll sponsored by Main Street Action and UpNorthNews)	July 23–26, 2026	1,085 (LV)	± 3.0%	13%	21%	66%
State Navigate	July 23–26, 2026	1,085 (LV)	± 3.0%	9%	16%	76%

=== Results ===
Primary results by county: Xiong: 50–60%; 60–70%; 70–80%; Helmenstine: 50–60%

Primary results by precinct: Xiong: 40–50%; 50–60%; 60–70%; 70–80%; 80–90%; >90%; Helmenstine: 50–60%; 60–70%; 70–80%; 80–90%; >90%; Tie: 40–50%; 50%; Write-In: 100%; No Votes

Democratic primary results
Party	Candidate	Votes	%
Democratic	Yee Leng Xiong	381,375	57.1
Democratic	Dylan Helmenstine	284,960	42.7
Write-in		1,638	0.2
Total votes		667,973	100.0

== General election ==
=== Post-primary endorsements ===
Yee Xiong (D)

State legislators

- Angelito Tenorio, AD-14 (2025–present)
- Melissa Ratcliff, SD-16 (2025–present)

Labor unions

- AFSCME Council 32
- AFT-Wisconsin
- Service Employees International Union Wisconsin
- United Auto Workers
- Wisconsin AFL-CIO

Organizations

- Citizen Action of Wisconsin
- Fair Wisconsin
- Our Wisconsin Revolution

Newspapers

- The Badger Herald
- The Capital Times
- Milwaukee Courier
- The Shepherd Express

=== Results ===
2026 Wisconsin State Treasurer election
Party	Candidate	Votes	%	±%
Democratic	Yee Leng Xiong	1,362,292	51.8	
Republican	John Leiber (incumbent)	1,268,099	48.2	
Write-in				
Total votes			100.0%	
Democratic gain from Republican				

== See also ==
- 2026 United States state treasurer elections
- 2026 Wisconsin elections

== Notes ==
Partisan clients
