= List of Wisconsin state legislatures =

The legislature of the U.S. state of Wisconsin has convened many times since statehood became effective on May 29, 1848. It continues to operate under the Constitution of Wisconsin of 1848.

== Legislatures ==
Number	Start date	End date	General election
1st Wisconsin Legislature	June 5, 1848	January 1, 1849	February 1, 1848
2nd Wisconsin Legislature	January 1, 1849	January 7, 1850	November 7, 1848
3rd Wisconsin Legislature	January 7, 1850	January 6, 1851	November 6, 1849
4th Wisconsin Legislature	January 6, 1851	January 5, 1852	November 5, 1850
5th Wisconsin Legislature	January 5, 1852	January 3, 1853	November 4, 1851
6th Wisconsin Legislature	January 3, 1853	January 2, 1854	November 2, 1852
7th Wisconsin Legislature	January 2, 1854	January 1, 1855	November 8, 1853
8th Wisconsin Legislature	January 1, 1855	January 7, 1856	November 7, 1854
9th Wisconsin Legislature	January 7, 1856	January 5, 1857	November 6, 1855
10th Wisconsin Legislature	January 5, 1857	January 4, 1858	November 4, 1856
11th Wisconsin Legislature	January 4, 1858	January 3, 1859	November 3, 1857
12th Wisconsin Legislature	January 3, 1859	January 2, 1860	November 2, 1858
13th Wisconsin Legislature	January 2, 1860	January 7, 1861	November 8, 1859
14th Wisconsin Legislature	January 7, 1861	January 6, 1862	November 6, 1860
15th Wisconsin Legislature	January 6, 1862	January 5, 1863	November 5, 1861
16th Wisconsin Legislature	January 5, 1863	January 4, 1864	November 4, 1862
17th Wisconsin Legislature	January 4, 1864	January 2, 1865	November 3, 1863
18th Wisconsin Legislature	January 2, 1865	January 1, 1865	November 8, 1864
19th Wisconsin Legislature	January 1, 1866	January 7, 1867	November 7, 1865
20th Wisconsin Legislature	January 7, 1867	January 6, 1868	November 6, 1866
21st Wisconsin Legislature	January 6, 1868	January 4, 1869	November 5, 1867
22nd Wisconsin Legislature	January 4, 1869	January 3, 1870	November 3, 1868
23rd Wisconsin Legislature	January 3, 1870	January 2, 1871	November 2, 1869
24th Wisconsin Legislature	January 2, 1871	January 1, 1872	November 8, 1870
25th Wisconsin Legislature	January 1, 1872	January 6, 1873	November 7, 1871
26th Wisconsin Legislature	January 6, 1873	January 5, 1874	November 5, 1872
27th Wisconsin Legislature	January 5, 1874	January 4, 1875	November 4, 1873
28th Wisconsin Legislature	January 4, 1875	January 3, 1876	November 3, 1874
29th Wisconsin Legislature	January 3, 1876	January 1, 1877	November 2, 1875
30th Wisconsin Legislature	January 1, 1877	January 7, 1878	November 7, 1876
31st Wisconsin Legislature	January 7, 1878	January 6, 1879	November 6, 1877
32nd Wisconsin Legislature	January 6, 1879	January 5, 1880	November 5, 1878
33rd Wisconsin Legislature	January 5, 1880	January 3, 1881	November 4, 1879
34th Wisconsin Legislature	January 3, 1881	January 2, 1882	November 2, 1882
35th Wisconsin Legislature	January 2, 1882	January 1, 1883	November 8, 1881
36th Wisconsin Legislature	January 1, 1883	January 5, 1885	November 7, 1882
37th Wisconsin Legislature	January 5, 1885	January 3, 1887	November 4, 1884
38th Wisconsin Legislature	January 3, 1887	January 7, 1889	November 2, 1886
39th Wisconsin Legislature	January 7, 1889	January 5, 1891	November 6, 1888
40th Wisconsin Legislature	January 5, 1891	January 2, 1893	November 4, 1890
41st Wisconsin Legislature	January 2, 1893	January 7, 1895	November 8, 1892
42nd Wisconsin Legislature	January 7, 1895	January 4, 1897	November 6, 1894
43rd Wisconsin Legislature	January 4, 1897	January 2, 1899	November 3, 1896
44th Wisconsin Legislature	January 2, 1899	January 7, 1901	November 8, 1898
45th Wisconsin Legislature	January 7, 1901	January 5, 1903	November 6, 1900
46th Wisconsin Legislature	January 5, 1903	January 2, 1905	November 4, 1902
47th Wisconsin Legislature	January 2, 1905	January 5, 1907	November 8, 1904
48th Wisconsin Legislature	January 5, 1907	January 4, 1909	November 6, 1906
49th Wisconsin Legislature	January 4, 1909	January 2, 1911	November 3, 1908
50th Wisconsin Legislature	January 2, 1911	January 6, 1813	November 8, 1910
51st Wisconsin Legislature	January 6, 1913	January 4, 1915	November 5, 1912
52nd Wisconsin Legislature	January 4, 1915	January 1, 1917	November 3, 1914
53rd Wisconsin Legislature	January 1, 1917	January 6, 1919	November 7, 1916
54th Wisconsin Legislature	January 6, 1919	January 3, 1921	November 5, 1918
55th Wisconsin Legislature	January 3, 1921	January 1, 1923	November 2, 1920
56th Wisconsin Legislature	January 1, 1923	January 5, 1925	November 7, 1922
57th Wisconsin Legislature	January 5, 1925	January 3, 1927	November 4, 1924
58th Wisconsin Legislature	January 3, 1927	January 7, 1929	November 2, 1926
59th Wisconsin Legislature	January 7, 1929	January 5, 1931	November 6, 1928
60th Wisconsin Legislature	January 5, 1931	January 2, 1933	November 4, 1930
61st Wisconsin Legislature	January 2, 1933	January 7, 1935	November 8, 1932
62nd Wisconsin Legislature	January 7, 1935	January 4, 1937	November 6, 1934
63rd Wisconsin Legislature	January 4, 1937	January 2, 1939	November 3, 1939
64th Wisconsin Legislature	January 2, 1939	January 6, 1941	November 8, 1938
65th Wisconsin Legislature	January 6, 1941	January 4, 1943	November 5, 1940
66th Wisconsin Legislature	January 4, 1943	January 1, 1945	November 3, 1942
67th Wisconsin Legislature	January 1, 1945	January 6, 1947	November 7, 1944
68th Wisconsin Legislature	January 6, 1947	January 3, 1949	November 5, 1946
69th Wisconsin Legislature	January 3, 1949	January 1, 1951	November 2, 1948
70th Wisconsin Legislature	January 1, 1951	January 5, 1953	November 7, 1950
71st Wisconsin Legislature	January 5, 1953	January 3, 1955	November 4, 1952
72nd Wisconsin Legislature	January 3, 1955	January 7, 1957	November 2, 1954
73rd Wisconsin Legislature	January 7, 1957	January 5, 1959	November 6, 1956
74th Wisconsin Legislature	January 5, 1959	January 2, 1961	November 4, 1958
75th Wisconsin Legislature	January 2, 1961	January 7, 1963	November 8, 1960
76th Wisconsin Legislature	January 7, 1963	January 4, 1965	November 6, 1962
77th Wisconsin Legislature	January 4, 1965	January 2, 1967	November 3, 1964
78th Wisconsin Legislature	January 2, 1967	January 6, 1969	November 8, 1966
79th Wisconsin Legislature	January 6, 1969	January 4, 1971	November 5, 1968
80th Wisconsin Legislature	January 4, 1971	January 1, 1973	November 3, 1970
81st Wisconsin Legislature	January 1, 1973	January 6, 1975	November 7, 1972
82nd Wisconsin Legislature	January 6, 1975	January 3, 1977	November 5, 1974
83rd Wisconsin Legislature	January 3, 1977	January 1, 1979	November 2, 1976
84th Wisconsin Legislature	January 1, 1979	January 5, 1981	November 7, 1978
85th Wisconsin Legislature	January 5, 1981	January 3, 1983	November 4, 1980
86th Wisconsin Legislature	January 3, 1983	January 7, 1985	November 2, 1982
87th Wisconsin Legislature	January 7, 1985	January 5, 1987	November 6, 1984
88th Wisconsin Legislature	January 5, 1987	January 2, 1989	November 4, 1986
89th Wisconsin Legislature	January 2, 1989	January 7, 1991	November 8, 1988
90th Wisconsin Legislature	January 7, 1991	January 4, 1993	November 6, 1990
91st Wisconsin Legislature	January 4, 1993	January 2, 1995	November 3, 1992
92nd Wisconsin Legislature	January 2, 1995	January 6, 1997	November 8, 1994
93rd Wisconsin Legislature	January 6, 1997	January 4, 1999	November 5, 1996
94th Wisconsin Legislature	January 4, 1999	January 1, 2001	November 3, 1998
95th Wisconsin Legislature	January 1, 2001	January 6, 2003	November 7, 2000
96th Wisconsin Legislature	January 6, 2003	January 3, 2005	November 5, 2002
97th Wisconsin Legislature	January 3, 2005	January 1, 2007	November 2, 2004
98th Wisconsin Legislature	January 1, 2007	January 5, 2009	November 7, 2006
99th Wisconsin Legislature	January 5, 2009	January 3, 2011	November 4, 2008
100th Wisconsin Legislature	January 3, 2011	January 7, 2013	November 2, 2010
101st Wisconsin Legislature	January 7, 2013	January 5, 2015	November 6, 2012
102nd Wisconsin Legislature	January 5, 2015	January 4, 2017	November 4, 2014
103rd Wisconsin Legislature	January 4, 2017	January 7, 2019	November 8, 2016
104th Wisconsin Legislature	January 7, 2019	January 4, 2021	November 6, 2018
105th Wisconsin Legislature	January 4, 2021	January 2, 2023	November 3, 2020
106th Wisconsin Legislature	January 2, 2023	January 6, 2025	November 8, 2022
107th Wisconsin Legislature	January 6, 2025	January 4, 2027	November 5, 2024
108th Wisconsin Legislature	January 4, 2027	January 2029	November 3, 2026

== See also ==
- List of speakers of the Wisconsin State Assembly
- List of governors of Wisconsin
- Wisconsin State Capitol
- Elections in Wisconsin
- Politics of Wisconsin
- Historical outline of Wisconsin
- Lists of United States state legislative sessions
