= List of Superfund sites in Wisconsin =

This is a list of Superfund sites in Wisconsin designated under the Comprehensive Environmental Response, Compensation, and Liability Act (CERCLA) environmental law. The CERCLA federal law of 1980 authorized the United States Environmental Protection Agency (EPA) to create a list of polluted locations requiring a long-term response to clean up hazardous material contaminations. These locations are known as Superfund sites, and are placed on the National Priorities List (NPL).

The NPL guides the EPA in "determining which sites warrant further investigation" for environmental remediation. As of March 26, 2010, there were 38 Superfund sites on the National Priorities List in Wisconsin. One additional site has been proposed for entry on the list. Six sites have been cleaned up and removed from the list.

== Superfund sites ==
Proposed for addition to National Priorities List
Deleted from National Priorities List

CERCLIS ID	Name	County	Reason	Proposed	Listed	Construction completed	Partially deleted	Deleted
WID980610380	Algoma Municipal Landfill	Kewaunee	Groundwater contaminated with VOCs and heavy metals.	06/10/1986	07/22/1987	03/01/1994	–	–
WIN000510210	Amcast Industrial Corporation	Ozaukee	Past investigations at the South Property have detected the presence of polychlorinated biphenyls (PCBs) in soils below the parking lot, the railroad right-of-way east of the parking lot, the fill and subsurface soils below the former disposal area, the storm sewer system, and the shallow groundwater.	04/09/2009	09/23/2009	–	–	–
WISFN0507952	Ashland/Northern States Power Lakefront	Ashland	The subsurface soil, groundwater, lake sediments and surface water are contaminated by varying concentrations of complex mixtures of organic chemicals known as polycyclic aromatic hydrocarbons (PAHs) and volatile organic compounds (VOCs).	12/01/2000	09/05/2002	12/02/2019	–	–
WIT560010118	Better Brite Plating Chrome & Zinc Shops	Brown	High concentrations of chromium, zinc, cadmium, and cyanide were detected in wastes, surface water and soil samples. During periods of high water levels, chromium-contaminated surface water collected in the backyards of adjacent residences.	10/26/1989	08/30/1990	02/08/2000	–	–
WID980610646	City Disposal Corp. Landfill	Dane	Onsite groundwater and soil are contaminated with volatile organic compounds (VOCs).	09/08/1983	09/21/1984	06/23/2000	–	–
WID980820062	Delavan Municipal Well#4	Walworth	Presence of volatile organic compounds (VOCs)	09/08/1983	09/21/1984	09/28/2000	–	–
WID980820054	Eau Claire Municipal Well Field	Eau Claire	Groundwater at the site is contaminated with VOCs, including trichloroethene, dichloroethene, and tetrachloroethene.	09/08/1983	09/21/1984	09/28/1992	–	05/27/2014
WID980901227	Fadrowski Drum Disposal	Milwaukee	Groundwater contained mercury, benzene, chromium, barium, cyanide, and VOCs. Sediments from an onsite creek and ditches contained PAHs and inorganic compounds. Subsurface soil contaminated with low levels of VOCs, especially toluene.	10/15/1984	06/10/1986	08/28/1995	–	09/06/2005
WI0001954841	Fox River NRDA/PCB Releases	Brown	River sediments are contaminated with PCBs.	07/28/1998	–	–	–	–
WID980610059	Hagen Farm	Dane	Three disposal areas onsite; most of the waste in one main area (area A). Area A contained about 68,000 cubic yards of waste, including municipal refuse, paint sludges, grease, rubber, plastic sheeting, and several industrial chemicals. The major contaminants found in the waste and groundwater coming in contact with the waste were THF, benzene, ethylbenzene, toluene, xylenes, various semivolatile organic chemicals, barium, lead, and mercury.	09/18/1985	07/22/1987	08/27/1996	–	–
WID052906088	Hechimovich Sanitary Landfill	Dodge	Groundwater in several monitoring wells downgradient of the site is contaminated with VOCs in excess of state groundwater quality standards.	06/24/1988	03/31/1989	09/16/1997		
WID980511919	Hunts Disposal Landfill	Racine	Contaminants of concern include organic compounds such as vinyl chloride, benzene, trichloroethene, xylene, polychlorinated biphenyls (PCBs), and various metals such as arsenic, chromium, and barium.	06/10/1986	07/22/1987	05/07/1997		
WID000712950	Janesville Ash Beds	Rock	Soil and groundwater are contaminated with VOCs such as tetrachlorethene, trichloroethene and dichloroethene; surface water in the Rock River contains low levels of VOCs.	09/08/1983	09/21/1984	09/18/1997		
WID980614044	Janesville Old Landfill	Rock	Soil and groundwater are contaminated with VOCs such as tetrachloroethene, trichloroethene and dichloroethene; surface water in the Rock River contains low levels of VOCs.	09/08/1983	09/21/1984	09/18/1997		
WID006073225	Kohler Co. Landfill	Sheboygan	Groundwater is contaminated with various volatile organic compounds (VOCs), heavy metals, phenols, and polycyclic aromatic hydrocarbons (PAHs). Runoff water and sediments contain heavy metals, phenols, and PAHs. Leachate samples contain VOCs and heavy metals. Waste samples from the landfill contain VOCs, phenols, PAHs, polychlorinated biphenyls (PCBs), and heavy metals.	09/08/1983	09/21/1984	09/29/1998		
WID058735994	Lauer I Sanitary Landfill	Waukesha	Soils and leachate are contaminated with benzene, cyanide, toluene, and zinc.	09/08/1983	09/21/1984	09/28/1999		
WID980901243	Lemberger Landfill, Inc.	Manitowoc	Groundwater contaminated by VOCs, including 1,1,1-trichloroethane and trichloroethylene, extends about one mile to the northwest from the site. VOCs that were present in the shallow groundwater near Lemberger Landfill have attenuated.	09/18/1985	06/10/1986	09/09/1996		
WID056247208	Lemberger Transport & Recycling	Manitowoc	The groundwater, underlying and extending as far as 1.5 mile downgradient from LTR is contaminated with VOCs primarily including 1,1,1-trichloroethane, 1,1-dichloroethane, 1,1-dichloroethylene, trichloroethylene, and cis-1,2-dichloroethylene.	09/08/1983	09/21/1984	10/22/1996		
WID078934403	Madison Metropolitan Sewerage District	Dane	The sludge in the lagoons is contaminated with polychlorinated biphenyls (PCBs) and is a potential health concern to people living near the site.	06/24/1988	02/21/1990	09/19/2001	–	–
WID980820070	Master Disposal Service Landfill	Waukesha	The groundwater and soil were found to be contaminated with volatile organic compounds (VOCs), including benzene, toluene, xylenes, and chlorinated solvents. Inorganic contaminants included cadmium, chromium, arsenic, lead, iron, manganese, and barium. A surface water ditch which drains into the site and ultimately leads into the Fox River was found to contain cadmium levels exceeding pertinent state water quality standards.					
WID980823082	Mid-State Disposal, Inc. Landfill	Marathon	Groundwater in the vicinity of the site was shown to contain volatile organic compounds (VOCs) including: vinyl chloride, tetrachloroethene, trichloroethene, and benzene.					
WID039052626	Moss-American (Kerr-McGee Oil Co.)	Milwaukee	Groundwater samples showed elevated levels of volatile organic compounds (VOCs) and polycyclic aromatic hydrocarbons (PAHs). Free-standing creosote or an oil sheen was observed in three monitoring well samples; similar observations were noted in eight test pits. The primary contaminants detected in the river sediments are PAHs. Contaminants that were found in the soil in the processing area and vicinity, the treated wood storage area, and the northeast and southeast landfills include components of creosote: PAHs, benzene, ethylbenzene, toluene, and xylenes (BTEX) compounds. PAHs were detected in a ditch that drains water from the site to the river. The Little Menomonee River has been affected by contaminated surface water runoff and sediments from the site. Potential health risks exist for individuals inhaling volatilized chemicals or ingesting or coming into direct contact with the contaminated sediments, soil, groundwater, or surface water.					
WID000713180	Muskego Sanitary Landfill	Waukesha	Groundwater, underlying the site, is contaminated with volatile organic compounds (VOCs) and heavy metals from landfill wastes.					
WID083290981	N.W. Mauthe Co., Inc.	Outagamie	Surface and subsurface soils were contaminated with VOCs, including benzene, toluene, ethylbenzene, and xylenes (BTEX), chlorinated hydrocarbons, 2-butanone, chromium, cadmium, zinc, and cyanide. Groundwater is contaminated with VOCs, SVOCs, and various inorganic compounds.					
WID006196174	National Presto Industries, Inc.	Chippewa	The most environmentally significant waste that was generated was waste forge compound, which was a lubricant used in the forging of 105mm shells. The contaminants of concern were 1,1,1-trichloroethane (TCA) and trichloroethylene (TCE). Waste water discharged to Lagoon No. 1 contained significant amounts of waste forge compound, resulting in groundwater contamination.	10/15/1984	06/10/1986	09/21/1999	–	–
WID006183826	Northern Engraving Co.	Monroe		09/08/1983	09/21/1984	09/29/1989	–	10/29/1997
WID006100275	Oconomowoc Electroplating Co. Inc.	Dodge	The groundwater, wetland and creek sediments, and subsurface soils are contaminated with heavy metals, cyanide, and volatile organic compounds (VOCs) from electroplating activities. The heavy metals include chromium, cadmium, copper, nickel, and zinc.	09/08/1983	09/21/1984	09/25/1996		
WID000808568	Omega Hills North Landfill	Washington		09/08/1983	09/21/1984	06/15/2001	–	12/11/1996
WID980821656	Onalaska Municipal Landfill	La Crosse	The solvents from the landfill have contaminated the groundwater beneath the site, causing the contamination of an adjacent homeowner's drinking water well that the town of Onalaska replaced in the early 1980s. A floating layer of hydrocarbons, which acts as a source of groundwater contamination, was found to be emanating from the landfill.					
WID006176945	Penta Wood Products	Burnett	On-site soils and groundwater were contaminated with PCP, arsenic, copper, and zinc. Ingestion of and direct contact with the contamination prior to remedy implementation could have posed a health threat. Soil contamination also posed a threat to the animals living on and adjacent to the site.					
WID980610604	Refuse Hideaway Landfill	Dane	Soils and onsite and offsite groundwater, including private wells southwest of the site, are contaminated with various volatile organic compounds (VOCs), including perchloroethene, trichloroethene, and vinyl chloride.	02/07/1992	10/14/1992	09/30/1998		
WID980610190	Ripon City Landfill	Fond du Lac	The remedial investigation determined that groundwater beneath and near the site was contaminated with various volatile organic compounds (VOCs), including vinyl chloride, tetrachloroethene, trichloroethene, cis-1,2-dichloroethene, and benzene at low levels. The discovery in 2001 that vinyl chloride was at unacceptable levels in wells at two homes about 1500 ft downgradient (south-southwest) of the landfill has resulted in an ongoing investigation of the extent of the contamination.					
WID980610141	Sauk County Landfill	Sauk	Soil and groundwater was contaminated with VOCs. Arsenic, beryllium and polyaromatic hydrocarbons (PAHs) were detected at elevated levels in on-site soils.					
WID980820096	Schmalz Dump	Calumet	Groundwater is contaminated by lead and chromium; soil, sediments, and surface water were contaminated with heavy metals and PCBs.					
WID046536785	Scrap Processing Co., Inc.	Taylor	Soils and sediments are contaminated with heavy metals, including lead, barium, copper, and zinc. Elevated levels of polychlorinated biphenyls (PCBs) were also found in soil samples.	09/08/1983	09/21/1984	02/24/2000	–	09/25/2020
WID980996367	Sheboygan Harbor & River	Sheboygan	Sediments are contaminated with PCBs and a wide variety of heavy metals. Soils and surface water are contaminated with PCBs and heavy metals, including arsenic, chromium, copper, lead, and zinc.	09/18/1985	06/10/1986	01/30/2013	–	–
WID980902969	Spickler Landfill	Marathon	During the remedial investigation of the Spickler Landfill site that took place in the late 1980s, some landfill gas was detected onsite, and asbestos was confirmed to be present in a landfill cover soil sample. In addition, leachate samples from the mercury brine pit contained elevated levels of calcium (3,340,000 ppb), magnesium (2,180,000 ppb), mercury (666 ppb), and nine organic compounds. Groundwater samples from monitoring wells sampled during the remedial investigation showed exceedences of maximum contaminant level (MCL) drinking water standards for the following chemicals: benzene (8 ppb), vinyl chloride (39 ppb), barium (4,690 ppb), copper (2,250 ppb), iron (4,280 ppb), and manganese (54 ppb).	01/22/1987	07/22/1987	09/29/1998		
WID980901219	Stoughton City Landfill	Dane	The groundwater is contaminated with organic chemicals, including tetrahydrofuran and freon. Methane has been detected in the landfill.	10/15/1984	06/10/1986	12/15/1998		
WID980610299	Tomah Armory	Monroe	Presence of limited groundwater and soil contamination by volatile organic compounds (VOCs) and heavy metals.	01/22/1987	07/22/1987	09/23/1997	–	02/05/2019
WID980616841	Tomah Fairgrounds	Monroe	Operated in the 1950s as an open, unlined dump. Groundwater and soil contaminated with volatile organic compounds and heavy metals.	01/22/1987	07/22/1987	09/26/1996	–	08/20/2001
WID980610307	Tomah Municipal Sanitary Landfill	Monroe	In 1984, U.S. EPA inspected the site and confirmed that onsite groundwater is contaminated with heavy metals and volatile organic compounds (VOCs).	06/10/1986	03/31/1989	10/16/2003	–	–
WID980901235	Waste Management of Wisconsin (Brookfield Sanitary Landfill)	Waukesha	The groundwater was contaminated with various volatile organic compounds (VOCs), including vinyl chloride and cyanide from site landfilling operations.	06/24/1988	08/30/1990	06/15/2001	–	–
WID990829475	Waste Research & Reclamation Co.	Eau Claire	Reclamation and recycling business for hazardous liquid wastes, fuel blending and transportation of hazardous waste for incineration or disposal. Facility operations contaminated soil, surface water and groundwater with hazardous chemicals	09/08/1983	09/21/1984	–	–	02/05/1993
WID980993521	Wausau Ground Water Contamination	Marathon	The groundwater and soil are contaminated with various VOCs.	04/10/1985	06/10/1986	03/18/1994	–	–
WID980610620	Wheeler Pit	Rock	Gravel pit contaminated with paint and wastewater sludge from an auto assembly plant, as well as coal ash from power plant boilers.	09/08/1983	09/21/1984	12/29/1992	–	04/20/2004

== See also ==
- List of Superfund sites in the United States
- List of environmental issues
- List of waste types
- TOXMAP
