= Matt Adamczyk =

American businessman and politician

35th Treasurer of Wisconsin
- In office January 3, 2015 – January 7, 2019
- Governor: Scott Walker
- Preceded by: Kurt Schuller
- Succeeded by: Sarah Godlewski

Personal details
- Born: June 9, 1978 (age 48) Milwaukee, Wisconsin, U.S.
- Party: Republican
- Education: University of Wisconsin, Madison (BA)

Matt Adamczyk (born June 9, 1978) is an American businessman and politician, who served as the 35th Wisconsin State Treasurer.

== Early life ==
Adamczyk grew up in Wauwatosa, Wisconsin on June 9, 1978. He went to Pius XI High School in Milwaukee, Wisconsin and received his bachelor's degree from University of Wisconsin–Madison in 2000.

== Career ==
He helped manage his family business, Adamczyk Heating and Cooling and owns a home rental property business. Adamczyk was also an advisor to Republican members of the Wisconsin State Legislature, including Senator Leah Vukmir and Representative Tyler August.

=== Wisconsin Treasurer ===
On November 4, 2014, Adamczyk was elected Wisconsin State Treasurer succeeding Kurt W. Schuller who did not seek re-election. Adamczyk ran on a platform of removing the office, stating, "The antiquated office no longer is needed and has become a prime example of wasteful government spending." Adamczyk has been vociferously opposed to climate conservation programs, even seeking to punish and censor coworkers who had been assigned to work on such projects, including Tia Nelson. After entering office, Adamczyk cut two positions in the office but continued to draw his $70,000 a year salary while campaigning against the existence of the office. Adamczyk succeeded in lobbying the state legislature for a constitutional amendment eliminating the role of State Treasurer. However, the referendum held in the April 2018 election failed by a margin of 61.75% voting no (to retain the state treasurer office) and 38.25% voting yes.

According to public reports by Wisconsin Attorney General Brad Schimel and Wisconsin Secretary of State Doug La Follette, Adamczyk verbally abused and harassed staff in the Board of Commissioners of Public Lands office. He declined to seek reelection in the 2018 election, in which Sarah Godlewski was elected to succeed him in January 2019.

=== Wisconsin Assembly Campaign ===
In the November 2018 election, Adamczyk ran for a seat in the Wisconsin State Assembly representing the 14th District. He was narrowly defeated in the election by Democrat Robyn Vining.

== Electoral history ==
Wisconsin Treasurer Republican Primary Election, 2014
Party	Candidate	Votes	%
Republican	Matt Adamczyk	132,596	61.75
Republican	Randall Melchert	82,117	38.25

Wisconsin Treasurer Election, 2014
Party	Candidate	Votes	%
Republican	Matt Adamczyk	1,120,140	48.80
Democratic	David Sartori	1,026,548	44.73
Independent	Ron Hardy	66,120	2.88
Independent	Jerry Shidell	53,113	2.31
Constitution	Andrew Zuelke	28,053	1.22

District 14 Wisconsin Assembly Race, 2018
Party	Candidate	Votes	%
Democratic	Robyn Vining	16,579	48.59
Republican	Matt Adamczyk	16,447	48.20
Libertarian	Rick Braun	691	2.03
Independent	Steven Shevey	402	1.18

== Notes ==
Party political offices
Preceded by Kurt W. Schuller	Republican nominee for State Treasurer of Wisconsin; 2014	Succeeded by Travis Hartwig
Political offices
Preceded by Kurt W. Schuller	Treasurer of Wisconsin; 2015–2019	Succeeded by Sarah Godlewski
