= Ashland/Northern States Power Lakefront =

The Ashland/Northern States Power Lakefront Superfund site is a contaminated region of the Wisconsin shoreline of Lake Superior that is being studied for remediation by Northern States Power Wisconsin (NSPW), as well as the Environmental Protection Agency (EPA), the Wisconsin Department of Natural Resources (WDNR). This site has held a manufactured gas plant from 1845 to 1947, as well as lumber manufacturing and treatment mills for four decades at the start of the 20th century, railcar loading facilities, and a municipal landfill. Additionally, a wastewater treatment plant is located on the premises, but is not in operation. Contamination of the site is currently believed to have been caused by all the parties mentioned above, or former owners of the property whose companies are no longer in business. The area is listed as a Superfund site by the EPA under the Comprehensive Environmental Response, Compensation, and Liability Act (CERCLA). Releases of hazardous substances occurred onshore and migrated into sediment in Chequamagon Bay on Lake Superior.

== History ==
The history of the site can be broken down into the operational histories of each of the components to the contaminated site.

=== Manufactured gas plant ===
During the late 19th and early 20th centuries, the most common form of energy and lighting used in homes, industry, and public was flammable gas that was burned for whatever effect was desired (heat, light, etc.). This gas was made at a Manufactured Gas Plant (MGP). At the Ashland site, the MGP was located on the bluffs behind and slightly raised above the shoreline, and was in operation from 1845 until 1947. Here, coal, peat, and other materials were heated, creating a gas that could be stored and pumped out to consumers. However, this created tar and tar-tainted water as by-products that had to be disposed of. Some of the tar may have been used to treat lumber at the nearby lumber manufacturers. The rest had to be disposed of, a portion of which was dumped or released. A result was that many of the by-products ended up in local terrestrial and aquatic environments. This was the source of the MGP's main contribution to the contamination to the site. Although NSPW did not own or operate the MGP itself, it eventually acquired the liabilities as a successor to the former MGP operator.

=== Lumber manufacture ===
From 1901 until 1939, a company known as the John Schroeder Lumber Company owned and operated a sawmill on the banks of Lake Superior, down below the MGP mentioned above. In the course of its life, the mill manufactured and treated various wood products. These process included cutting logs into beams and planks, treating woods with tars and other chemicals to seal them, etc. By-products of these process were wood chips, saw dust, and particulates of the tar/creosote products used. After the plant was closed, its title passed to the County of Ashland and then to the City of Ashland, who eventually built a wastewater treatment plant on nearby land.

=== Landfill ===
For a period of time, a portion of this locale was used as a landfill by the City mostly for municipal waste and destruction debris. It opened sometime in the 1880s and closed in 1951.

=== Wastewater treatment plant ===
Built in 1951 and expanded in 1972, the wastewater treatment plant serviced the greater Ashland area. In the process of exploring further expansion options in 1989, contaminated soil and groundwater samples were found, indicating a potential problem. The City closed that plant, and built a new one a few miles away. Five years later, in 1994, an investigation was launched into the area to determine the reach of the contamination.

== Timeline ==
- 1845 - Manufactured Gas Plant opens.
- 1880s - Dumping at the landfill begins.
- 1901 - Lumber manufacturer John Schroeder sets up mill.
- 1939 - Lumber mill closes
- 1947 - Manufactured Gas Plant closes
- 1951 - Wastewater Treatment Plant opens
- 1972 - Wastewater Treatment Plant expands
- 1989 - Contamination discovered in sediments and groundwater.
- 1989 - Wastewater Treatment Plant closed
- 1994 - Investigation into area begins

== Contaminants ==
The primary contaminants are tar (VOCs, SVOCs, heavy metals, oil sheens) and wood by-products (sawdust, chips, lumber, tar), as well as landfill waste. Additionally, some of the organic contaminants are concentrated into non-aqueous phase liquids (NAPL).

=== Tar ===
Tar itself is a dangerous substance. In its makeup, it often contains polycyclic aromatic hydrocarbons and trace heavy metals, both of which are suspected to be carcinogenic. Additionally, the tar releases Volatile Organic Compounds (VOCs) and Semi Volatile Organic Compounds (SVOCs). VOCs and SVOCs contain carbon as a basis to their structure, and are prone to evaporating under normally reasonable temperatures and pressures. They are usually highly noxious, and can be harmful to the photochemical processes that are important to our atmosphere. The removal of these products is the main end goal for the remediation of the site, and is proving to be the greatest challenge to clean.

=== Wood byproducts ===
Unlike tar, the wood is not inherently dangerous. It is the location and abundance of it that makes it a problem. Estimates say that the depth of wood by-products in the region of the bay ranges from two feet to ten feet thick, on top of approximately six feet of contaminated sediment. This makes the extraction of the contaminated sediment difficult and greatly increases the amount of material that has to be removed and cleaned.

=== Landfill waste ===
Landfill waste plays a smaller role at the site, because it is not nearly as toxic as the tar, nor is it as large of volume as the wood by-products. In many ways, the landfill waste plays a similar role to the wood by-products, in that they are both excess waste materials that will have to be extracted and cleaned before being processed.

== Environmental, ecological, and biological effects ==
=== Environmental effects ===
The environmental effects of the pollutants are fairly straightforward in that they are all potentially harmful to nature. The toxic tar releases chemicals that cause imbalances in the water and in the air, as well as seeding the sediments with more heavy metals than inherently exist in them. This can have a detrimental effect on local flora and fauna as their systems have to deal with potentially increased toxicity. On the atmospheric side, VOCs and SVOCs contribute to ground-level ozone, smog, and generally lower the air quality in the region they are present, though the amount of VOCs and SVOCs released into the atmosphere is very low under current conditions at the site

=== Ecological effects ===
In this case, the ecology has yet to be greatly influenced by the presence of these chemicals, probably due to the layer of wood by-products and landfill waste piled on top. So far the only fauna to show a potential rise in toxicity is the rainbow smelt, but the results haven't been verified yet. Otherwise, all game fish have been shown to be clean for consumption according with guidelines that were already in place. It is unknown at the moment if any species of terrestrial creatures are experiencing any increased toxicity.

=== Biological effects ===
The largest biological effect that the chemical immediately has on the human body is the offensive smell and, if touched, a potential burning sensation and possible development of a rash. In the longer run, the VOCs, SVOCs, and heavy metals are all proven carcinogens, and should be avoided with care.

== Challenges ==
There are numerous challenges that come along with the cleanup of any contaminated site. At this location, however, two unique geological figures further the challenges in subtle ways. First, the site sits over a large artesian aquifer, which is an underground spring that is pressurized but capped by a large sheet of impermeable clay. So, care must be taken in the cleanup process to not puncture that clay barrier and unleash the torrents of the spring, because it will create safety risks and most likely spread the contaminants farther and wider into the lake basins. The second hurdle is that Lake Superior is the world's largest freshwater lake. Meaning that once a chemical is dispersed into one part of the body of water, it will be near impossible to contain it there. So the removal must be swift and clean in its methods.

== Proposed solutions ==
As of early 2013, the parties involved are revolving around three main ideas to remediate sediment: wet dredging, dry dredging, or an engineered shoreline. Wet dredging is using a bucket or claw like scoop to bring up tons of sediment from the lake floor. In dry dredging, an artificial barrier is built around the region to be worked on, then pumped dry. Then workers scrape off the top layers, and when they're done they remove the barrier. The engineered shoreline remedy would involve wet dredging the sediments further from shore and placing them near-shore, creating new land for redevelopment of the waterfront. The cost range of these plans is from $35 million to $77 million.

== Current affairs ==
As of early 2013, remediation of on-land contaminated areas is underway, and the parties involved are trying to determine the best, safest, and most cost-effective way to go about cleaning up the Ashland Lakefront Superfund site.
