= List of city nicknames in Wisconsin =

This list of city nicknames in Wisconsin compiles the aliases, sobriquets and slogans that Wisconsin's cities and towns are known by (or have been known by historically), officially and unofficially, to municipal governments, local people, outsiders or their tourism boards or chambers of commerce. City nicknames can help in establishing a civic identity, helping outsiders recognize a community or attracting people to a community because of its nickname; promote civic pride; and build community unity. Nicknames and slogans that successfully create a new community "ideology or myth" are also believed to have economic value. Their economic value is difficult to measure, but there are anecdotal reports of cities that have achieved substantial economic benefits by "branding" themselves by adopting new slogans.

Some unofficial nicknames are positive, while others are derisive. The unofficial nicknames listed here have been in use for a long time or have gained wide currency.

== Nicknames by city ==
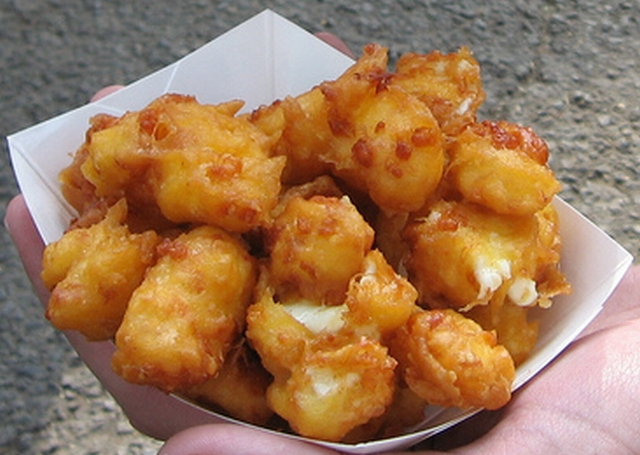
The nicknames of several Wisconsin communities celebrate the state's cheese-making industry. Cheese curds, shown here covered with batter and deep-fried, traditionally have been available only at cheese factories.

=== A ===
- Algoma
  - Wisconsin's Trout and Salmon Capital
  - Warm Welcomes, Cool Breezes and Hot Fishing
- Allenton – You Have Friends in Allenton
- Alma Center – Strawberry Capital of Wisconsin
- Amery – City of Lakes
- Arbor Vitae/Woodruff – Crossroads of the North
- Ashland – Ashland Tops Wisconsin

=== B ===
- Babcock – The Cranberry Pie Capital
- Baldwin – The Biggest Little Town in Wisconsin
- Baraboo
  - Circus City of the World
  - Gem City
- Barron – Turkey Capital of Wisconsin
- Bayfield – Best Kept Secret in Wisconsin
- Bear Creek – Home of the World's Largest Sauerkraut Plant
- Beaver Dam – Beaver Dam – Make Yourself at Home
- Belleville – UFO Capital of the World
- Belmont – Home of the First Territorial Capital
- Beloit – Gateway to Wisconsin
- Berlin – Fur and Leather Capital
- Birchwood – Bluegill Capital of Wisconsin
- Black Creek
  - Birthplace of the First Organized National Baseball Team
  - Crossroads to the Northwoods
- Black Earth – The Only Black Earth in the World
- Black River Falls – Deer Capital of Wisconsin
- Blanchardville – The Village in the Valley
- Bloomer – Rope Jump Capital of the World
- Blue River – Heart of the Lower Wisconsin River
- Bonduel – Spelling Capital of Wisconsin
- Boscobel
  - Birthplace of the Gideon Bible
  - Turkey Hunting Capital of Wisconsin
- Boulder Junction – Musky Capital of the World
- Boyceville – Cucumber Capital of Wisconsin
- Boyd – The Friendly Town – Why Go By
- Brodhead – The Bicycle Gateway to Wisconsin
- Burlington – Chocolate City, USA

=== C ===
- Cambridge – The Umbrella City
- Cassville – Where History, Bald Eagles and the Mississippi Meet
- Cedarburg – Historic Cedarburg
- Chippewa Falls – Naturally the World's Purest Water
- Clam Lake – Heart of the Chequamegon National Forest
- Clintonville – The Good Life Unlimited
- Colby – Home of Colby Cheese
- Columbus – Red Bud City
- Combined Locks
  - Headwaters Vacationland
  - Conservation, Protection, Preservation
- Cornell – Stacker City
- Cornucopia – Wisconsin's northernmost Post Office
- Cross Plains – Famous For Friendliness
- Cuba City – The City of Presidents
- Cumberland
  - Rutabaga Capital
  - The Island City

=== D ===
- Darlington – The Pearl of the Pecatonica, U.S.A.
- Delavan – Clown Town, U.S.A
- Dickeyville – Home of the Famous Dickeyville Grotto
- Dodgeville – At the heart of it all
- Dousman – Bullfrog Station

=== E ===
- Eagle River
  - Snowmobile Capital of the World
  - Wisconsin's Cranberry Country
- Eau Claire
  - Music Capital of the North
  - Horseradish Capital of the World
  - Kubb Capital of North America
- Eden – Hometown of Baseball Star Jim Gantner
- Edgar – Progressive Village Serving People
- Edgerton – Tobacco City
- Elkhorn
  - The Christmas Card City
  - Living in Harmony
- Ellsworth – Cheese Curd Capital of Wisconsin
- Elmwood – UFO Capital of the World
- Ephraim – The Pearl of the Peninsula
- Ettrick – Fun City, USA
- Evansville – Soybean Capital of Wisconsin
- Exeland – Trout Fishing Capital of Wisconsin

=== F ===
- Fennimore – Fennimore..."The City on the Move!"
- Florence County – Heart of Wild Rivers Country
- Fond du Lac – Winners Choice
- Forest Junction – You Can Get There From Here
- Fox Cities – Refreshing Change of Place
- Fox Lake – Home of Bunny Berigan
- Francis Creek – A Nice Place to Live
- Fremont – White Bass Capital of the World

=== G ===
- Galesville – Garden of Eden
- Gays Mills – The Apple Capital of Wisconsin
- Germantown
  - Deutschstadt
  - Gateway to Washington County
- Gleason – Brook Trout Fishing Capital of the World
- Glidden – Black Bear Capital of the World
- Grantsburg – Home of Big Gust
- Green Bay
  - Titletown USA
  - Toilet paper Capital of the World
  - Packertown
- Green Lake – Wisconsin's Lake Trout Capital

=== H ===
- Haugen – Kolache Capital
- Hayward – Home of World Record Muskies
- Hazel Green – Point of Beginning
- Hillsboro – Czech Capital of Wisconsin
- Holmen – Yes, Holmen
- Horicon – Home of the Horicon Marsh
- Hurley – Where 51 Ends...Family Fun Begins

=== J ===
- Janesville
  - Bower City
  - City of Parks
  - Wisconsin's Park Place
- Jefferson – The Gemütlichkeit City
- Jim Falls – Biggest Little Town on the River
- Johnson Creek – Crossroads With a Future
- Juda – Buffalo Roast Capital of Wisconsin
- Juneau – Birthplace of Addie Joss (Baseball Hall of Fame pitcher)

=== K ===
- Kaukauna – The Electric City
- Kenosha – Kenosha...For All Seasons
- Kewaskum – Gateway to the Kettle Moraine State Forest
- Kewaunee – Kewaunee – Spirit of the Lakeshore

=== L ===
- La Crosse – God's Country. Mud City, USA
- Lac du Flambeau – Lake of Torches
- Lake Geneva – Enjoyed for Over 100 Years by the Rich & Famous
- Lake Tomahawk – Snowshoe Baseball Capital of the World
- Lancaster – City of the Dome
- Land O' Lakes – Land of Four Seasons Fun
- Langlade County – Wisconsin's Get-Away County
- Lodi – Home of Susie the Duck
- Lone Rock – Coldest Spot in the Nation (With the Warmest Heart)

=== M ===
- Madison
  - Mad City
  - Madtown
  - City of Four Lakes
  - Berkeley of the Midwest
- Manitowish Waters – Wisconsin's Northwoods Year-Round Vacationland
- Manitowoc
  - Wisconsin's Maritime Capital
  - Manty
  - Clipper City
  - Skunk Hollow
- Marinette – Marinette County Waterfalls Capital of Wisconsin
- Marshfield
  - The City in the Center
  - Cheese City USA
- Mayville – Jayville
- Mazomanie – Turn-of-the-Century Railroad Town
- Medford – People, Pride and Progress
- Menasha (city) – Menasha on the Move
- Menasha (town) – Bridging the Fox Cities
- Menomonie – Traditional Yet Progressive
- Mercer – Loon Capital of the World
- Merrill – Enjoy the Merrill Advantage
- Middleton – The Good Neighbor City
- Milton – History in Progress
- Milwaukee
  - Brew City/Brew Town/The Brew
  - City of Festivals
  - Cream City
  - The German Athens of America
  - A Great Place on a Great Lake
  - Mil-town
- Mineral Point – The City Where Wisconsin Began
- Minocqua – The Island City
- Monona – City of Pride, and It Shows
- Monroe – Swiss Cheese Capital of the U.S.A
- Montfort – Home of the Fort
- Mt. Horeb – The Troll Capital
- Mukwonago - Place of the Bear
- Muscoda – Morel Mushroom Capital of Wisconsin

=== N ===
- New Auburn – Gateway to the Ice Age Park
- New Berlin – City Living with a Touch of Country.,
- New Glarus – America's Little Switzerland
- New Holstein – Cow Town, USA
- New London – Heart of Wolf River Country
- New Richmond – The City Beautiful
- Norwalk – The Black Squirrel Capital of the World

=== O ===
- Oak Creek – Where City Meets The Country
- Oconomowoc – A Special Place
- Oconto – Oconto – History on the Bay
- Omro – Bridge to the Future
- Onalaska – Sunfish Capital of the World
- Oregon – Horse Capital of Wisconsin
- Oshkosh
  - Oshkosh on the Water
  - Wisconsin's Event City

=== P ===
- Palmyra – Heartbeat of the Kettle Moraine
- Pardeeville – Home of the World Watermelon Eating and Seed Spitting Championships
- Park Falls – Ruffed Grouse Capital of the World
- Peshtigo – Home of the Great Peshtigo Fire
- Phelps – Headwaters County (Start of Wisconsin River)
- Phillips
  - We've Saved a Place for You!
  - Trophy Whitetail Capital
- Pittsville – Exact Geographical Center of the State
- Platteville – Home of the Chicago Bears Summer Training Camp
- Plover – Golden Sands Area
- Plum City – A Small Village in a Peaceful Valley
- Plymouth – The Cream of Wisconsin
- Poniatowski – The Center of the Northwestern World
- Port Washington
  - Picturesque Port Washington
  - Jewel of the Lake Michigan Shore
- Portage
  - Historic Portage
- Potosi-Tennyson – Catfish Capital of Wisconsin
- Prairie du Chien – Wisconsin's Second Oldest Settlement (Where Great Rivers Meet)
- Prescott – Where the Mighty Mississippi Meets the Beautiful St. Croix River
- Presque Isle
  - Walleye Capital of the World
  - Wisconsin's Last Wilderness
- Price County – We've Saved a Place for You
- Princeton – Princeton on the Fox – Where Yesterday Meets Tomorrow
- Pulaski – Polka Town

=== R ===
- Racine
  - Kringle Capital of the World
  - The Belle City
- Randolph – A Great Place to Grow
- Redgranite – Home of the State Rock
- Reedsburg – Butter Capital of America
- Rhinelander – Home of the Hodag
- Richland Center – From Farming to Frank Lloyd Wright
- Ripon – Birthplace of the Republican Party

=== S ===
- Sauk City/Prairie du Sac – Cow Chip Throwing Capital of Wisconsin
- Saukville – Saukville Will Work for You
- Sayner-Star Lake – The Birthplace of the Snowmobile
- Seymour – Home of the Hamburger
- Sheboygan
  - Bratwurst Capital of the World
  - The City of Cheese, Chairs, and Children
- Shiocton – Where Nature Begins
- Siren – Lilac Capital of Wisconsin
- Soldiers Grove – America's First Solar Village
- Somerset – Tubing Capital of the World
- Sparta – Bicycling Capital of America
- Spencer – A Friendly Small Town with a Future
- Spooner – Crossroads of the North
- Spring Valley – Home of the Largest Earthen Dam in the Midwest
- St. Germain
  - The Friendliest Town in the Northwoods
  - All Trails Lead to St. Germain
  - Birthplace of Colorama
- Stevens Point – See Our Point of View
  - Gateway to the Pineries
- Stockbridge – Sturgeon Center of the World
- Stoughton – The City of Progress and Opportunity
- Stratford – Stratford on the Move
- Sun Prairie – The Groundhog Capital of the World
- Superior
  - Where Sail Meets Rail
  - I'm a Superior Lover
  - Soup Town
  - The Twin Ports (with Duluth, Minnesota).

=== T ===
- Taycheedah – Sheepshead Fishing Capital of the World
- Tilden – Halfway Between the North Pole and the Equator
- Tomah
  - Where the I Divides
  - Gateway to Cranberry Country
- Tomahawk – Gateway to the Northwoods
- Trego – The Wild River City
- Two Rivers
  - Birthplace of the Ice Cream Sundae
  - Coolest Spot in Wisconsin or the Cool City

=== V ===
- Verona – Hometown USA
- Viroqua – Viroqua Quality – Discover It

=== W ===
- Warrens – The Cranberry Capital of Wisconsin
- Watertown – Home of the First Kindergarten in America
- Waukesha
  - Spring City
  - Birthplace of Les Paul
- Waunakee – The Only Waunakee in the World
- Waupaca – Chain-O-Lakes
- Waupun
  - City of Sculpture
  - Prison City
  - Wild Goose Center of Wisconsin
- Wausau – Our Peak Season Never Ends
- Wausaukee – Ranger City USA
- Wautoma – Christmas Tree Capital of the World
- Wauwatosa – Tosa
- Webster – The Fishbowl of Wisconsin
- Weyauwega – Home of Horse and Buggy Days
- Winneconne – Winneconne on the Wolf
- Wisconsin Dells – Waterpark Capital of the World (commercial, trademarked)
- Wisconsin Rapids – Paper City
- Wonewoc
  - Midpoint of the 400 Trail
  - We Are User Friendly
- Woodman – The Dinky's Last Stop
- Woodruff – Home of the Million Penny Parade

== See also ==
- List of city nicknames in the United States
- List of cities in Wisconsin
- List of towns in Wisconsin
- List of villages in Wisconsin
