= JoCasta Zamarripa =

Secretary of State-elect of Wisconsin and member of Milwaukee Common Council

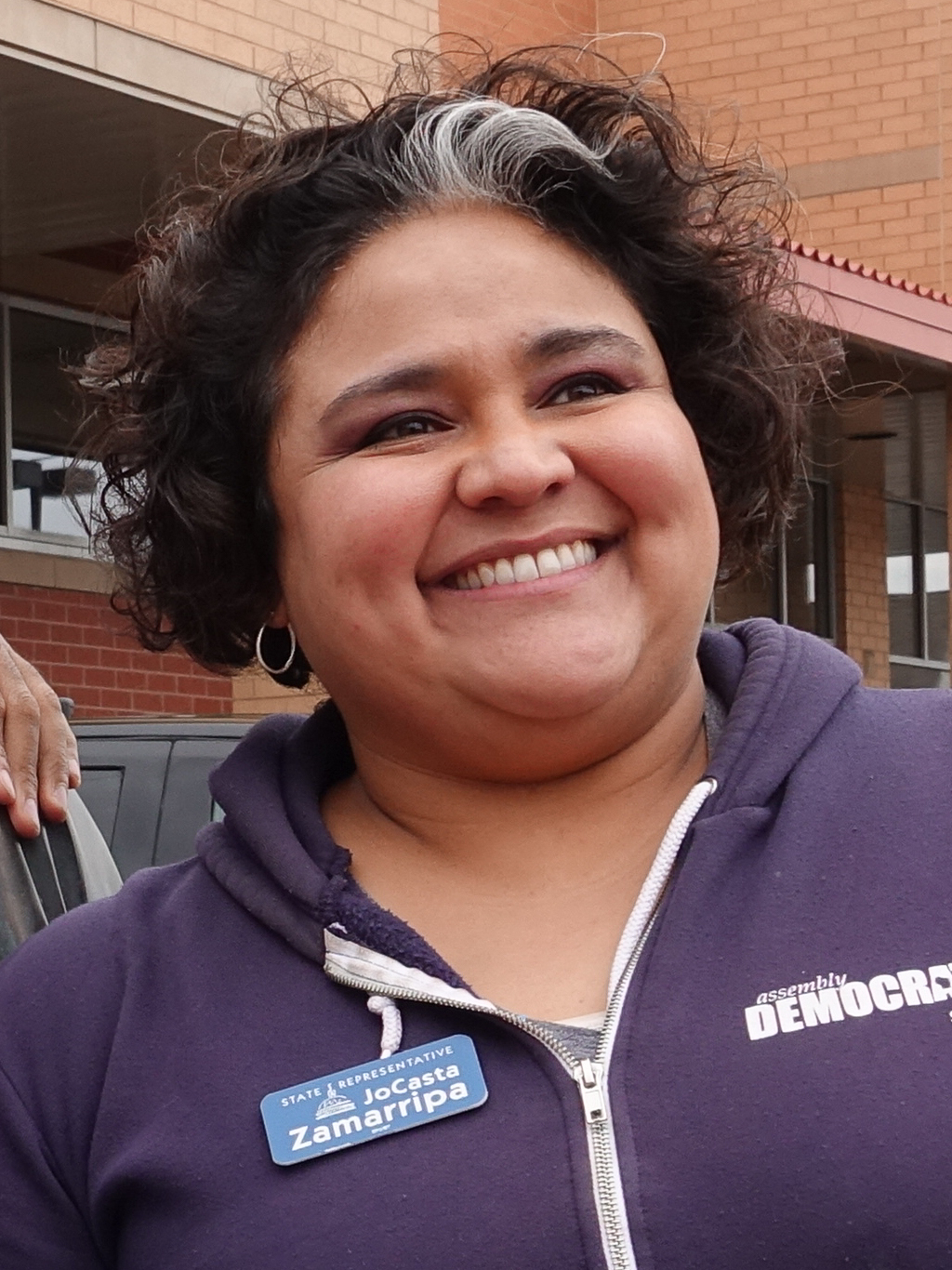
- Zamarripa in 2018

Secretary of State-elect of Wisconsin
- Assuming office January 2027
- Governor: David Crowley (elect)
- Succeeding: Sarah Godlewski

Member of the Milwaukee Common Council from the 8th district
- Incumbent
- Assumed office April 21, 2020
- Preceded by: Bob Donovan

Member of the Wisconsin State Assembly from the 8th district
- In office January 3, 2011 – January 4, 2021
- Preceded by: Pedro Colón
- Succeeded by: Sylvia Ortiz-Velez

Personal details
- Born: March 8, 1976 (age 50) Milwaukee, Wisconsin, U.S.
- Party: Democratic
- Education: University of Wisconsin, Milwaukee (BA)
- Website: Campaign website State Assembly website

JoCasta Zamarripa (born March 8, 1976) is an American community organizer and Democratic politician from Milwaukee, Wisconsin. She is set to become the next Secretary of State of Wisconsin, having won the 2026 election. She is the first Latina to win a statewide election in Wisconsin.

She currently serves as a member of the Milwaukee Common Council, since 2020, and previously served ten years as a member of the Wisconsin State Assembly (2011–2021). Prior to winning elective office, Zamarripa worked as an outreach coordinator for Planned Parenthood.

== Early life and education ==
Born in Milwaukee, Wisconsin, Zamarripa graduated from St. Joan Antida High School. She earned a B.F.A. from the University of Wisconsin–Milwaukee in 2005.

== Career ==
She was elected to the 8th Wisconsin State Assembly district in 2010. During her five terms in the legislature, she was primary author of fifty bills, with her 2015 Assembly Bill 83 (relating to signage for the Basilica of St. Josaphat) being the only bill to be passed by both houses and signed into law. Previously, she had worked as an outreach coordinator at Planned Parenthood of Wisconsin.

In a July 2012 interview with the Milwaukee Journal Sentinel, she announced that she is bisexual. She was one of four openly LGBT members of the Wisconsin Legislature, alongside Senator Tim Carpenter (D–Milwaukee) and Representatives Mark Spreitzer (D–Beloit) and Todd Novak (R–Dodgeville). In 2014, she was included as part of the annual "40 under 40" list in The Advocate.

In 2017, Zamarripa attended Harvard University's John F. Kennedy School of Government program for Senior Executives in State and Local Government as a David Bohnett LGBTQ Victory Institute Leadership Fellow.

In 2026, she became the first Latina to win a statewide election in Wisconsin, winning an election for Wisconsin’s secretary of state.

Party political offices
Preceded by Doug La Follette	Democratic nominee for Secretary of State of Wisconsin; 2026	Most recent
Wisconsin State Assembly
Preceded by Pedro Colón	Member of the Wisconsin State Assembly from the 8th district January 3, 2011 – January 4, 2021	Succeeded by Sylvia Ortiz-Velez
