= Yee Leng Xiong =

Treasurer-elect of Wisconsin (born 1994)

- Official portrait

38th Treasurer-elect of Wisconsin
- Assuming office January 4, 2027
- Governor: David Crowley (elect)
- Succeeding: John Leiber

Member of the Board of Supervisors of Marathon County, Wisconsin, from the 19th district
- Incumbent
- Assumed office April 2016
- Preceded by: Mort McBain

Personal details
- Born: May 20, 1994 (age 32) Wausau, Wisconsin, U.S.
- Citizenship: United States
- Party: Democratic

Yee Leng Xiong (RPA: Yim Leej Xyooj; born May 20, 1994) is an American community organizer and Democratic politician. He is the Treasurer-elect of the U.S. state of Wisconsin, and the first person of Hmong descent to win an election for statewide office anywhere in the United States. Since 2016, he has served as a member of the board of supervisors of Marathon County, Wisconsin.

== Early life ==
Xiong was born in Wausau, Wisconsin, United States, on May 20, 1994, to Hmong parents who fled Laos at the end of the Vietnam War. After spending years in a refugee camp in Thailand, they came to Wausau, Wisconsin, where Xiong was born. He was raised in Weston, Wisconsin, where he moved in 2000. Xiong graduated from D.C. Everest Senior High School in Schofield, Wisconsin, in 2012. Xiong attended the University of Wisconsin–Marathon County before leaving to focus on work in the community.

== Political career ==
Xiong ran for a position on the D.C. Everest School District school board in 2014, and won. He was elected to the board of supervisors of Marathon County, Wisconsin, in 2016, and the board of trustees for Weston, Wisconsin, in 2018. In 2019, Governor Tony Evers named Xiong to the Governor's Financial Literacy Council. Xiong became the executive director of the Hmong American Center in Wausau in 2016 and held the role until 2024, later stating that the organization went from $50,000 in debt to a $1.9 million annual budget during his tenure.

In 2024, Xiong ran for the Wisconsin State Assembly in the 85th district as a member of the Democratic Party. He lost the election to incumbent Republican Patrick Snyder, 52% to 48%.

=== Wisconsin State Treasurer ===
Xiong ran for State Treasurer of Wisconsin in the 2026 elections. During the campaign, he described the office as an "independent fiscal watchdog," and advocated for taking a broader approach to the office's duties, while incumbent John Leiber campaigned on limiting the office strictly to its existing constitutional and statutory responsibilities.

Xiong stated that his priorities included overseeing the Common School Fund, supporting low-interest municipal infrastructure loans, returning unclaimed property to residents, promoting financial literacy, and act out state-level regulations for data centers, arguing that these functions could help address rising household costs.

During the primary, Xiong was endorsed by U.S. Senator Tammy Baldwin and defeated Dylan Ray Helmenstine in the Democratic primary election in July as well as Republican John Leiber in the November general election. He became the first person of Hmong descent to win a statewide election in the United States.

== Electoral history ==
=== Wisconsin Assembly (2024) ===
Wisconsin Assembly, 85th District, 2024
Party	Candidate	Votes	%	±%
Republican	Patrick Snyder (incumbent)	15,636	53.17	
Democratic	Yee Leng Xiong	13,736	46.71	
Plurality		1,900	6.46	
Total votes		29,410	100.0	
Republican hold		Swing	-3.03%	

=== Wisconsin State Treasurer (2026) ===
Wisconsin State Treasurer Election, 2026
Party	Candidate	Votes	%	±%
Democratic Primary, August 11, 2026
Democratic	Yee Leng Xiong	381,375	57.09%	
Democratic	Dylan Ray Helmenstine	284,960	42.66%	
	Scattering	1,638	0.25%	
Plurality		96,415	14.43%	
Total votes		667,973	100.0%	
General Election, November 3, 2026 (unofficial results)
Democratic	Yee Leng Xiong	1,362,292	51.79%	+3.65pp
Republican	John Leiber (incumbent)	1,268,098	48.21%	−1.41pp
Plurality		94,194	3.58%	
Total votes		2,630,390	100.0%	+0.89%
Democratic gain from Republican				

Party political offices
Preceded by Dylan Helmenstine	Democratic nominee for Treasurer of Wisconsin; 2026	Most recent
