= John Leiber =

Treasurer of Wisconsin since 2023

37th Treasurer of Wisconsin
- Incumbent
- Assumed office January 3, 2023
- Governor: Tony Evers
- Preceded by: Sarah Godlewski

Personal details
- Born: October 17, 1977 (age 49) San Jose, California, U.S.
- Party: Republican
- Spouse: Diane Handrick
- Children: 3
- Education: University of Wisconsin, Parkside (BA); University of Wisconsin, Madison (JD)

John Samuel Leiber (born October 17, 1977) is an American lawyer and politician serving as the 37th state treasurer of Wisconsin since 2022. A Republican from Racine County, he previously served as president of the parks and recreation commission in Caledonia, Wisconsin, as well as a legislative aide in the Wisconsin State Assembly.

== Early life and education ==
Leiber was raised in Racine County, Wisconsin, and graduated from Prairie High School in Wind Point, Wisconsin, in 1996. He went on to attend University of Wisconsin–Parkside and earned his bachelor's degree in history in 2000. He then worked for several years as a teacher in the Racine Unified School District.

He resumed his education later in life, enrolling in the University of Wisconsin Law School after his defeat in the 2018 primary; he earned his J.D. in 2021.

== Political career ==
In 2009, Leiber became president of the parks and recreation commission in the village of Caledonia, Wisconsin, and was then employed as a legislative aide in the Wisconsin State Assembly from 2013 through 2016. During these years, he was active in the Republican Party of Racine County, and worked on behalf of the Caledonia school secession movement—an unsuccessful movement that sought to separate Caledonia's schools from the Racine Unified School District.

In 2018, Leiber ran for the Republican nomination for Wisconsin State Assembly in the 62nd Assembly district. He lost the primary to Racine school board president Robert Wittke, who went on to win the general election. After his defeat in the Assembly primary, Leiber worked briefly at the Wisconsin Department of Revenue as a tax representative, and then earn his Juris Doctor from the University of Wisconsin Law School and began practicing law.

=== State Treasurer (2023–Present) ===
Leiber ran for office again in 2022, seeking the Republican nomination for Wisconsin State Treasurer. He defeated Orlando Owens with 67% of the vote in the Republican primary and went on to narrowly defeat the Democratic candidate, Aaron Richardson, in the general election. He was sworn into office on January 3, 2023. He ran for reelection in 2026, but lost to Yee Leng Xiong.

== Personal life and family ==
John Leiber is one of three children born to Thomas F. Leiber and Sharon Lynn Charbogian-Leiber of Racine. Before her marriage, his mother was a personal secretary to U.S. representative Henry C. Schadeberg in Washington, D.C. All of John Leiber's maternal great-grandparents were Armenian American refugees who fled to America during the Armenian genocide.

Leiber and his wife, Diane, live in Cottage Grove, Wisconsin. They have three children.

== Electoral history ==
=== Wisconsin Assembly (2018) ===
Wisconsin Assembly, 62nd District Election, 2018
| Party | Candidate | Votes | % | ±% |
|---|---|---|---|---|
Republican Primary, August 14, 2018
| Republican | Robert Wittke | 3,931 | 67.50% | |
| Republican | John S. Leiber | 1,885 | 32.37% | |
| | Scattering | 8 | 0.14% | |
| Total votes | | 5,824 | 100.0% | |

=== Wisconsin Treasurer (2022) ===
Wisconsin State Treasurer Election, 2022
| Party | Candidate | Votes | % | ±% |
|---|---|---|---|---|
Republican Primary, August 9, 2022
| Republican | John S. Leiber | 357,384 | 65.58% | |
| Republican | Orlando Owens | 186,084 | 34.15% | |
| | Scattering | 1,455 | 0.27% | |
| Total votes | | 544,923 | 100.0% | |
General Election, November 7, 2022
| Republican | John S. Leiber | 1,293,553 | 49.62% | +3.48pp |
| Democratic | Aaron Richardson | 1,254,949 | 48.14% | −3.44pp |
| Constitution | Andrew Zuelke | 57,333 | 2.20% | |
| | Scattering | 1,268 | 0.05% | |
| Plurality | | 38,604 | 1.48% | -3.96pp |
| Total votes | | 2,607,103 | 100.0% | -2.61% |
| Republican gain from Democratic | | | | |

Party political offices
| Preceded by Travis Hartwig | Republican nominee for Treasurer of Wisconsin; 2022, 2026 | Most recent |
Political offices
| Preceded by Sarah Godlewski | Treasurer of Wisconsin; 2023–present | Incumbent |
