= Outline of Wisconsin =

Overview of and topical guide to Wisconsin

The flag of Wisconsin

The seal of Wisconsin

The location of the state of Wisconsin in the United States of America

The following outline is provided as an overview of, and a topical guide to, the U.S. state of Wisconsin:

Wisconsin – U.S. state located in the north-central United States and part of the Midwest. It is bordered by Minnesota to the west, Iowa to the southwest, Illinois to the south, Lake Michigan to the east, Upper Michigan to the northeast, and Lake Superior to the north. Wisconsin's capital is Madison, and its largest city is Milwaukee. In the 1890s, farmers in Wisconsin shifted from wheat to dairy production in order to make more sustainable and profitable use of their land.

== General reference ==
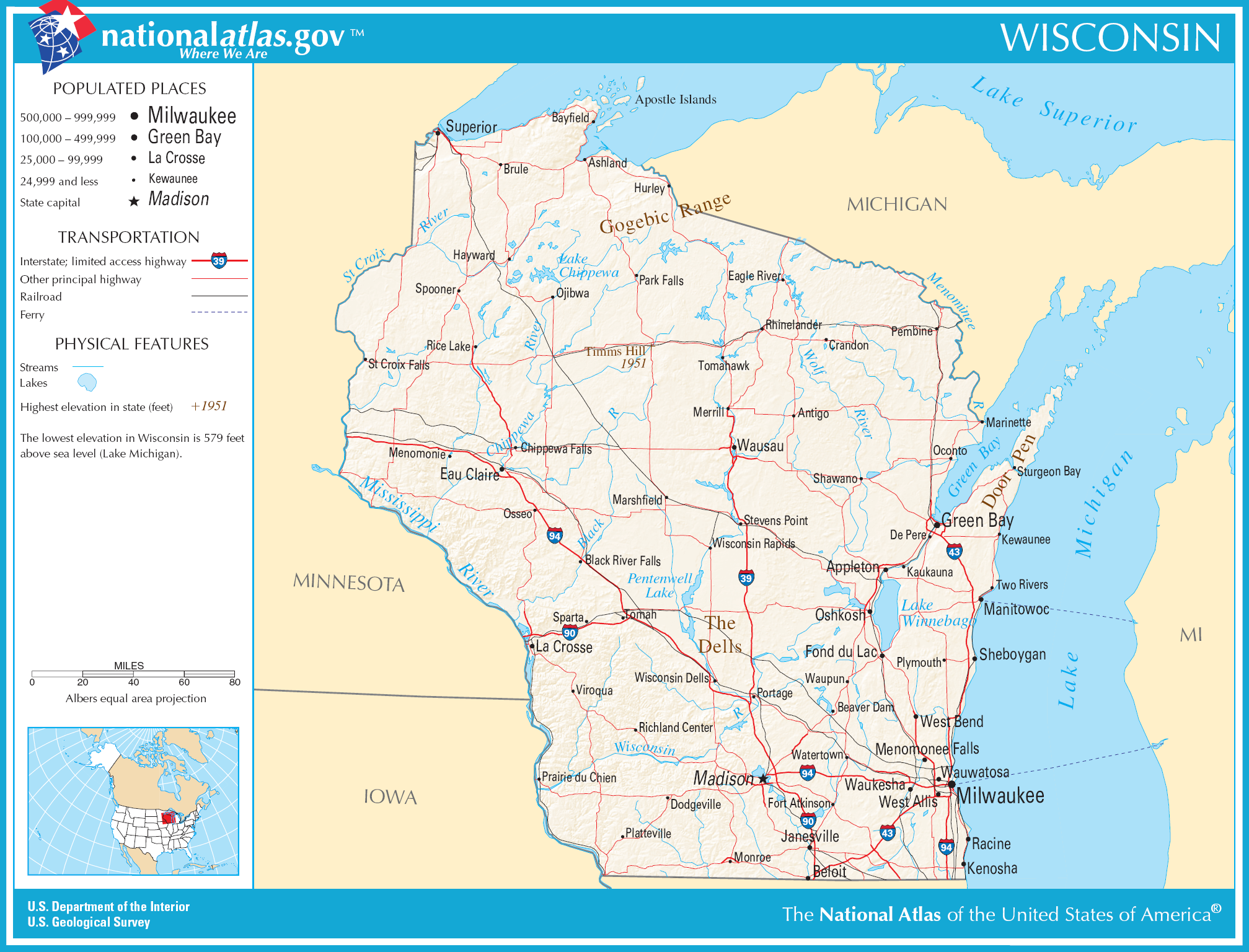
An enlargeable map of the state of Wisconsin

- Names
  - Common name: Wisconsin
    - Pronunciation: /wɪˈskɒnsɪn/
  - Official name: State of Wisconsin
  - Abbreviations and name codes
    - Postal symbol: WI
    - ISO 3166-2 code: US-WI
    - Internet second-level domain: .wi.us
  - Nicknames
    - America's Dairyland (currently used on license plates)
    - Badger State
- Demonym: Wisconsinite

== Geography of Wisconsin ==
Geography of Wisconsin

- Wisconsin is a U.S. state, a federal state of the United States of America
- Location
  - Northern Hemisphere
  - Western Hemisphere
    - Americas
      - North America
        - Anglo America
        - Northern America
          - United States of America
            - Contiguous United States
              - Central United States
                - East North Central States
              - Midwestern United States
          - Great Lakes Region
- Population of Wisconsin: 5,686,986 (2010 U.S. Census)
- Area of Wisconsin: 65,500 sq mi (169,640 km^{2})
- Atlas of Wisconsin

=== Places in Wisconsin ===
- Ice Age Trail
- List of bike trails in Wisconsin
- List of hiking trails in Wisconsin
- National Historic Landmarks in Wisconsin
- National Natural Landmarks in Wisconsin
- State parks in Wisconsin
- National Register of Historic Places listings in Wisconsin
  - Bridges on the National Register of Historic Places in Wisconsin
- Rustic Roads

=== Environment of Wisconsin ===
- Climate of Wisconsin
- State forests of Wisconsin
- Superfund sites in Wisconsin
- Birds of Wisconsin
- Ecoregions of Wisconsin

==== Natural geographic features of Wisconsin ====
- Lakes of Wisconsin

=== Regions of Wisconsin ===
- Central Wisconsin

==== Administrative divisions of Wisconsin ====
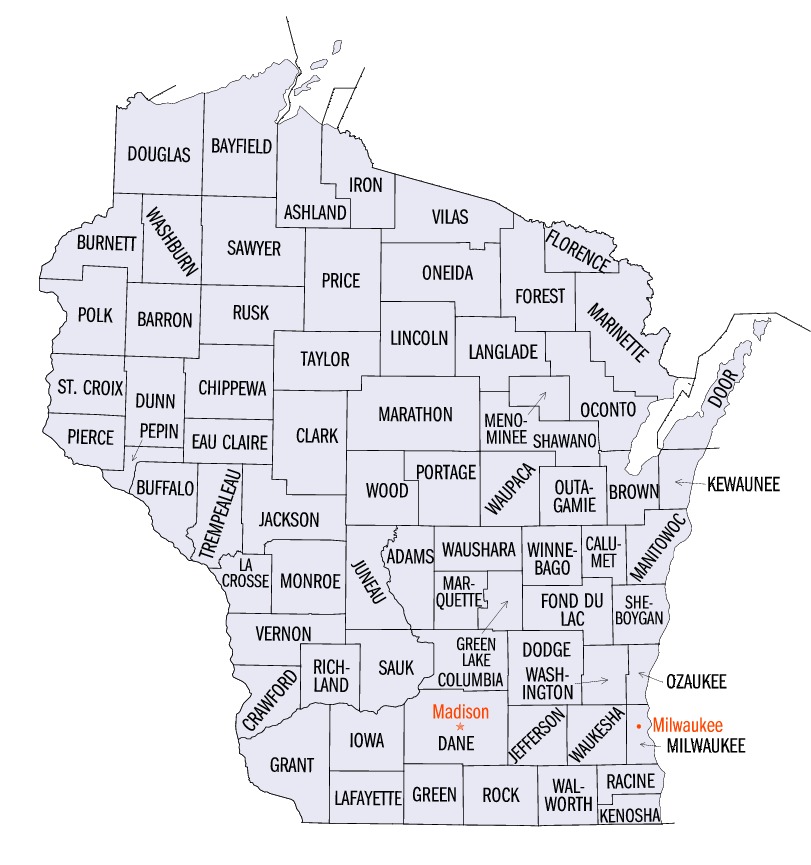
An enlargeable map of the 72 counties of the state of Wisconsin

- Political subdivisions of Wisconsin
  - The 72 counties of the state of Wisconsin
    - Cities in Wisconsin
      - State capital of Wisconsin:
      - City nicknames in Wisconsin
    - Villages in Wisconsin
    - Towns in Wisconsin

=== Demography of Wisconsin ===
Demographics of Wisconsin

== Government and politics of Wisconsin ==
Politics of Wisconsin

- Form of government: U.S. state government
- Wisconsin's congressional delegations
- Wisconsin State Capitol
- Elections in Wisconsin
- Political party strength in Wisconsin

=== Branches of the government of Wisconsin ===
Government of Wisconsin

==== Executive branch of the government of Wisconsin ====
- Governor of Wisconsin
  - Lieutenant Governor of Wisconsin
  - Secretary of State of Wisconsin
  - State Treasurer of Wisconsin
- State departments
  - Wisconsin Department of Administration
  - Wisconsin Department of Agriculture, Trade & Consumer Protection
  - Wisconsin Department of Children and Families
  - Wisconsin Department of Commerce
  - Wisconsin Department of Corrections
  - Wisconsin Department of Employee Trust Funds
  - Wisconsin Department of Financial Institutions
  - Wisconsin Department of Health Services
  - Wisconsin Department of Justice
  - Wisconsin Department of Military Affairs
  - Wisconsin Department of Natural Resources
  - Wisconsin Department of Public Instruction
  - Wisconsin Department of Revenue
  - Wisconsin Department of Safety and Professional Services
  - Wisconsin Department of Tourism
  - Wisconsin Department of Transportation
  - Wisconsin Department of Veterans Affairs
  - Wisconsin Department of Workforce Development

==== Legislative branch of the government of Wisconsin ====
- Wisconsin Legislature (bicameral)
  - Upper house: Wisconsin Senate
  - Lower house: Wisconsin State Assembly

==== Judicial branch of the government of Wisconsin ====
Courts of Wisconsin

- Supreme Court of Wisconsin
- Wisconsin Court of Appeals
- Wisconsin Circuit Court

=== Law and order in Wisconsin ===
- Cannabis in Wisconsin
- Capital punishment in Wisconsin
- Constitution of Wisconsin
- Crime in Wisconsin
- Gun laws in Wisconsin
- Law enforcement in Wisconsin
  - Law enforcement agencies in Wisconsin
- Same-sex marriage in Wisconsin

=== Military of Wisconsin ===
- Wisconsin Air National Guard
- Wisconsin Army National Guard

=== Local government in Wisconsin ===
Political subdivisions of Wisconsin

== History of Wisconsin ==
History of Wisconsin

=== History of Wisconsin, by period ===
- Prehistory of Wisconsin
- French colony of Canada, (1634–1763)
- French colony of Louisiana, (1699–1764)
  - Treaty of Fontainebleau of 1762
  - Treaty of Paris of 1763
- British (though predominantly Francophone) Province of Quebec, (1763–1783)-1791
- American Revolutionary War, 1775–1783
  - United States Declaration of Independence of 1776
  - Treaty of Paris of 1783
- Unorganized territory of the United States, 1783–1787
- Territory Northwest of the River Ohio, (1787–1800)-1803
- Territory of Indiana, (1800–1809)-1816
- Territory of Illinois, 1809–1818
  - War of 1812, 1812–1815
- Territory of Michigan, 1805–(1818–1836)-1837
  - Winnebago War, 1827
  - Black Hawk War, 1832
- Territory of Wisconsin, 1836–1848
- State of Wisconsin since May 29, 1848
  - Wisconsin in the American Civil War, 1861–1865

=== History of Wisconsin, by subject ===
- List of Wisconsin state legislatures

== Culture of Wisconsin ==
- Cuisine of Wisconsin
- Museums in Wisconsin
- Religion in Wisconsin
- Scouting in Wisconsin
- State symbols of Wisconsin
  - Flag of the State of Wisconsin
  - Great Seal of the State of Wisconsin

=== The arts in Wisconsin ===
- Music of Wisconsin

=== Sports in Wisconsin ===
Sports in Wisconsin

== Economy and infrastructure of Wisconsin ==
Economy of Wisconsin

- Agriculture in Wisconsin
  - Wisconsin dairy industry
- Communications in Wisconsin
  - Newspapers in Wisconsin
  - Radio stations in Wisconsin
  - Television stations in Wisconsin
- Energy in Wisconsin
  - Power stations in Wisconsin
  - Solar power in Wisconsin
  - Wind power in Wisconsin
- Health care in Wisconsin
  - Hospitals in Wisconsin
- Transportation in Wisconsin
  - Airports in Wisconsin

== Education in Wisconsin ==
Education in Wisconsin

- Schools in Wisconsin
  - School districts in Wisconsin
    - High schools in Wisconsin
  - Colleges and universities in Wisconsin
    - University of Wisconsin System
    - University of Wisconsin Colleges
    - Wisconsin Technical College System

== See also ==
- Topic overview:
  - Wisconsin
  - Index of Wisconsin-related articles
