= Sarah Godlewski =

Lietenant Governor-elect of Wisconsin (born 1981)

- Godlewski in 2026

Lieutenant Governor-elect of Wisconsin
- Assuming office January 4, 2027
- Governor: David Crowley (elect)
- Succeeding: Sara Rodriguez

31st Secretary of State of Wisconsin
- Incumbent
- Assumed office March 17, 2023
- Governor: Tony Evers
- Preceded by: Doug La Follette

36th Treasurer of Wisconsin
- In office January 7, 2019 – January 3, 2023
- Governor: Tony Evers
- Preceded by: Matt Adamczyk
- Succeeded by: John Leiber

Personal details
- Born: Sarah Ann Godlewski; November 9, 1981 (age 45) Eau Claire, Wisconsin, U.S.
- Party: Democratic
- Spouse: Max Duckworth
- Children: 1
- Education: George Mason University (BA); University of Pennsylvania (attended)
- Website: Campaign website

Sarah Ann Godlewski (born November 9, 1981) is an American businesswoman and politician who is the lieutenant governor-elect of Wisconsin, having won the 2026 election alongside David Crowley. A member of the Democratic Party, she has served as the 31st secretary of state of Wisconsin since 2023 and previously served as the 36th state treasurer of Wisconsin from 2019 to 2023.

Godlewski was a candidate for United States Senate in the 2022 election, but withdrew from the race in July 2022, before the primary election. She was appointed secretary of state by Governor Tony Evers after longtime secretary of state Doug La Follette resigned. She succeeded Felesia Martin as first vice chair of the Wisconsin Democratic Party in 2025. Godlewski was elected lieutenant governor of Wisconsin in the 2026 election. She will take office in January 2027.

== Early life and education ==
Godlewski was born and raised in Eau Claire, Wisconsin, and graduated from Eau Claire's Memorial High School in 2000. She completed a Bachelor of Arts degree in peace and conflict resolution from George Mason University. She also completed a certificate in public treasury management from the National Institute of Public Finance in partnership with Pepperdine School of Management, was a national security fellow at the Air War College, and attended both the University of Virginia Sorensen Institute for Political Leadership as well as the executive Master of Public Administration program at the University of Pennsylvania.

== Career ==
Godlewski has worked in philanthropy. Projects included education reform and public health in Uganda. Between 2004 and 2012, Godlewski worked for defense contractor Booz Allen Hamilton.

Godlewski with Hillary Clinton in 2016

Godlewski worked for Arapahoe County, Colorado, from 2012 to 2016 as the director of the Office of Strategy and Performance. During that time, Godlewski was a member of the Joint Task Force on Veterans with PTSD which made recommendations to the Department of Veterans Affairs and the United States Congress.

In 2015, Godlewski co-founded investment firm MaSa Impact with her husband Max Duckworth. They first met in 2013 on a regional volunteer board of the U.S. Fund for UNICEF.

In 2016, Godlewski was the director of Women's Outreach for Wisconsin in Hillary Clinton's presidential campaign. Godlewski caucused for Clinton in Colorado in March 2016. She did not vote in the general election in Wisconsin, because she was unsure of whether she qualified as a resident, according to a spokesperson.

Godlewski served on the board for the U.S. Fund for UNICEF and served as chairperson of the UNICEF Advocacy Committee. She also served on the board for mOm Incubators, the Arlington Academy of Hope, and George Mason University's School of Visual and Performance Arts. Godlewski has also been an investor with WE Capital.

=== Wisconsin state treasurer (2019–2023) ===
In 2018, Godlewski led a campaign coalition opposing a Wisconsin ballot measure that would have eliminated the office of the state treasurer from the Constitution of Wisconsin. Voters rejected the constitutional amendment, with 62% voting against eliminating the office of state treasurer. Just after the referendum, in April 2018, Godlewski announced her candidacy for state treasurer. Godlewski won a three-way primary on August 14, 2018, receiving 43.5% of the vote. Her opponents were former television anchor Cynthia Kaump and former state treasurer Dawn Marie Sass.

For the general election, Godlewski raised over $700,000 for her campaign, while Travis Hartwig, her Republican opponent, raised less than $13,000. Godlewski and her husband contributed over $300,000 to her own campaign. She won the general election with 50.9% of the vote, to Hartwig's 46.8%. She took more of the vote share than the newly elected Democratic governor, lieutenant governor, and attorney general and flipped 9 counties that had voted for Trump in the 2016 presidential election.

After being elected, Godlewski received a memo from the Wisconsin Legislative Reference Bureau that identified 16 responsibilities that the state treasurer should be doing but had neglected in recent years. During the transition for Governor-elect Tony Evers, Godlewski was appointed to serve as a member of the Next Generation Workforce and Economic Development Policy Advisory Council. In January 2019, Godlewski was unanimously elected to serve as chairwoman of the state Board of Commissioners of Public Lands. The state Board of Commissioners of Public Lands voted to lift a GOP mandated gag order prohibiting staff from discussing or considering the material risk of climate change to state investments. In August 2019, Godlewski and Governor Evers established a Retirement Task Force to create new investment options and expand awareness of retirement planning in Wisconsin. In February 2021, the task force presented its results to Governor Evers. Its recommendations included five proposals: WisconsinSaves, 401(K)ids, Emergency Savings, Incentivize Participation, and Interactive E-Commerce Portal. In March 2020, Godlewski created the Treasurer's Homeowners Task Force. In her role as the chair of the Board of Commissioners of Public Lands, she released an additional $5.25 million to aid in virtual learning on top of a record $38.2 million to public school libraries.

=== 2022 U.S. Senate election ===
On April 14, 2021, Godlewski announced that she would run for United States Senate in the 2022 election. She was endorsed by EMILY's List, a Democratic political action committee (PAC) that seeks to elect pro-choice women.

Godlewski's investments in 14 pharmaceutical companies drew scrutiny from a reporter at the Milwaukee Journal Sentinel due to her attacks on big pharma in advertisements for her Senate run. Godlewski's campaign responded that the stocks had all been sold by early 2022 and she had not been involved in routine investment management.

Godlewski dropped out of the race in July 2022 prior to the August 2022 Democratic primary and endorsed Lieutenant Governor Mandela Barnes. By the time she dropped out of the Senate race, it was too late to file to run for re-election as treasurer, and Godlewski's term in office expired in January 2023.

=== Wisconsin secretary of state (2023–present) ===
In a surprise announcement on March 17, 2023, Governor Tony Evers revealed that the recently re-elected secretary of state, Doug La Follette, would retire after 40 years in office. Evers then said that he would immediately appoint Godlewski to serve out the remainder of La Follette's four-year term, expiring January 2027.

=== 2026 Wisconsin lieutenant governor election ===
In July 2025, Godlewski announced her candidacy for lieutenant governor of Wisconsin in the 2026 election.

Party political offices
| Preceded by Dave Sartori | Democratic nominee for Treasurer of Wisconsin; 2018 | Succeeded by Aaron Richardson |
| Preceded by Sara Rodriguez | Democratic nominee for Lieutenant Governor of Wisconsin; 2026 | Most recent |
Political offices
| Preceded by Matt Adamczyk | Treasurer of Wisconsin; 2019–2023 | Succeeded by John Leiber |
| Preceded by Doug La Follette | Secretary of State of Wisconsin; 2023–present | Incumbent |
| Preceded by Sara Rodriguez | Lieutenant Governor of Wisconsin; Taking office 2027 | Elect |
