= D.C. Everest School District =

American School District for D.C. Everest

Address
- 6300 Alderson Street Weston, Wisconsin, 54416; United States
- Coordinates: 44°53′59.9″N 89°35′36.5″W

District information
- Type: Public
- Established: 1953; 73 years ago
- Superintendent: Casey Nye
- NCES District ID: 5513170

Students and staff
- Enrollment: 6,017 (2019-2020)
- Student–teacher ratio: 14.93
- District mascot: Evergreens
- Colors: Green and white

Other information
- Website: www.dce.k12.wi.us

The D.C. Everest School District is a public school district serving the city of Schofield, the villages of Weston, Hatley, Rothschild, and Kronenwetter, and the towns of Ringle and Easton in central Wisconsin.

== History ==
The district was named after David Clark Everest, whose management of Marathon Paper Mills greatly influenced the local area. The district was consolidated in 1950, with the senior high school opening in 1953 with 388 students in grades 9 through 12. Prior to this time, the district operated a K-10 school in Rothschild, a K-8 school in Schofield, and smaller one-room rural schools in the Township of Weston, Wisconsin, Wausau, and Kronenwetter, which became the basis for the elementary schools that exist in the district today.

In 1960, Rothschild Elementary was constructed. Three years later, the overcrowded junior-senior high school (today the junior high school) was expanded, Weston Elementary was constructed, and Schofield Elementary was expanded.

In the mid-1960s, the community approved the purchase of 63 acres of land, at a cost of $105,000. Although the original plans were to build a new middle school, the district decided to construct a new senior high school. In 1968, after the initial referendum for a nearly $5 million building was voted down, a $4 million building was approved for D.C. Everest Senior High School.

District enrollment expanded from 1,668 students in 1953 to 4,225 in 1971. To accommodate the growth, the district constructed Evergreen Elementary, which was dedicated in September 1976. It was the first district school to employ the open classroom concept. In 1979, Riverside Elementary was built in the town of Ringle.

In February 1996, the district approved funding of the Greenheck Field House, named after, and largely funded by Bob Greenheck, who also had a large impact on the community through his industry. In October 2023, a $35 million expansion to the Greenheck Field House began. This expansion included a 135,000 sq. ft. indoor turf facility, including a full-size soccer field, golf simulators, meeting rooms, and walking lanes. The Greenheck Turner Community Center opened its doors in August 2024.

To save money, the school district closed its Schofield and Easton elementary schools in June 2011. In September 2011, the school district opened its first charter school in Weston. The school, named Idea Charter School, is an alternate approach to learning for students in grades six through twelve.

The D.C. Everest Area School District is moving forward with a major restructuring plan to permanently close, partially demolish, and repurpose the D.C. Everest Junior High building. This strategy addresses declining enrollment and a 75-year-old facility facing significant maintenance needs.

== Schools ==
=== Elementary schools (K-5) ===
- Evergreen Elementary School
- Hatley Elementary School
- Mountain Bay Elementary School
- Odyssey Elementary School
- Riverside Elementary School
- Rothschild Elementary School
- Weston Elementary School

=== Middle and high schools ===
- D.C. Everest Middle School (6-7)
- D.C. Everest Jr. High School (8-9)
- D.C. Everest Sr. High School (10-12)
- D.C. Everest Idea School (6-12)

== External link ==
- Official website
