= D.C. Everest Senior High School =

- Everest Logo

Location
- 6500 Alderson Street; Weston, Wisconsin 54476; United States; 44°53′59″N 89°35′37″W

Information
- Type: Public high school
- Established: 1969; 57 years ago
- School district: D.C. Everest Area School District
- NCES District ID: 5513170
- Superintendent: Dr. Casey Nye
- NCES School ID: 551317001734
- Principal: Dallas Rennie
- Grades: 10–12
- Enrollment: ~1,361
  - Grade 10: 433
  - Grade 11: 446
  - Grade 12: 456
- Campus: Suburban
- Colors: Green and white
- Athletics: Wisconsin Valley Conference
- Mascot: Evergreen Tree
- Website: seniorhigh.dce.k12.wi.us

D.C. Everest Senior High School (also called DCE Senior high) is a Public high school located in Schofield, Wisconsin, United States. The school is part of the D.C. Everest School District

The school and district derive their name from David Clark Everest, a prominent leader in the Wisconsin paper industry.

== Academics ==
D.C. Everest Senior High School serves students in grades 10 through 12, operating on a standard semester schedule that includes Advanced Placement (AP) courses, dual-enrollment opportunities for college credit, and technical education pathways.

The district's grade configuration has historically separated younger adolescents into a dedicated junior high environment. However, following facility planning to address declining enrollment and aging infrastructure at the 75-year-old D.C. Everest Junior High School, the district proposed a reconfiguration plan to close portions of the junior high, move eighth graders to the middle school, and transition ninth-grade students into the Senior High School to expand course access and streamline facilities.

== Campus and facilities ==
The school shares a campus with a major multi-use athletic and recreational complex managed in partnership with the community. This includes the original Greenheck Field House, built in 1997, which features an Olympic-sized ice arena, multi-purpose courts, and racquetball facilities.

To further expand student and community athletic offerings, the campus added the adjacent Greenheck Turner Community Center (GTCC) in August 2024. Backed by a massive $35 million local capital campaign, this 135,000-square-foot facility houses an indoor artificial turf field, fitness center spaces, walking tracks, and sports simulators. Together, the complex serves both D.C. Everest student-athletes and the broader regional community.

== Demographics ==
For the 2024–25 academic year, D.C. Everest Senior High School enrolled 1,335 students, according to the National Center for Education Statistics. The school employed 79.32 full-time equivalent educators, resulting in a student to teacher ratio of 16.8:1.

Enrollment by race and ethnicity (2024–25)
Race and ethnicity^{†}	Enrolled pupils	Percentage
African American	27	2.02%
Asian	197	14.76%
Hispanic	81	6.07%
Native American	8	0.6%
White	973	72.88%
Native Hawaiian, Pacific islander	0	0%
Multi-race	49	3.67%
Total	1,335	100%
^{†} "Hispanic" includes Hispanics of any race. All other categories refer to non-Hispanics.

Enrollment by gender (2024–25)
Gender	Enrolled pupils	Percentage
Female	613	45.92%
Male	722	54.08%
Non-binary	0	0%
Total	1,335	100%

Enrollment by grade (2024–25)
Grade	Enrolled pupils	Percentage
9	0	0%
10	433	32.43%
11	446	33.41%
12	456	34.16%
Ungraded	0	0%
Total	1,335	100%

== Athletics ==
The D.C. Everest Senior High School athletic teams are known as the Evergreens and compete in the Wisconsin Interscholastic Athletic Association (WIAA) as a member of the Wisconsin Valley Conference. The school offers a comprehensive roster of varsity and sub-varsity sports across the fall, winter, and spring seasons. In alignment with WIAA scheduling conventions, certain sports are split by gender and season.

The athletic offerings include:

- Fall sports: Cross country (boys and girls), football (boys), soccer (boys), golf (girls), swimming (girls), tennis (girls), volleyball (girls), and dance.
- Winter sports:Basketball (boys and girls), curling (boys and girls), ice hockey (boys and girls), skiing/snowboarding (boys and girls), swimming (boys), wrestling (boys and girls), and dance.
- Spring sports: Baseball (boys), softball (girls), track and field (boys and girls), soccer (girls), golf (boys), tennis (boys), and lacrosse (boys and girls).

The Evergreens have earned several Wisconsin Interscholastic Athletic Association (WIAA) state championships in program history, most notably:

- Football: Division 1 state champions in 1981, 1983, and 1989.
- Girls basketball: State champions in 1986.

=== Athletic Conference History ===
Lumberjack Conference: 1953–1957

Wisconsin Valley Conference: 1957–present

== Music and performing arts ==
The D.C. Everest Performing Arts Department offers comprehensive instrumental and vocal music programs for students, including the high school marching band, concert bands, and jazz ensembles. The marching band actively performs at community events, local festivals, and school functions—including traditional pre-game and half-time performances during home football games.

In January 2023, members of the D.C. Everest marching band performed nationally as part of the Wisconsin Northwoods Marching Band in the 134th annual Tournament of the Rose Bowl Parade in Pasadena, California. The composite band brought together student musicians from eight high schools across north-central Wisconsin. In addition to instrumental music, the district's broader performing arts program has received extensive state recognition, including multiple awards through the Jerry Awards program for its theatrical and musical productions.

== Notable Alumni ==
- Derek Abney, former NFL wide receiver
- Kristin Dassler-Alfheim, Wisconsin State Senate
- Dave Krieg, former NFL quarterback
- Tim Seeley, comic book artist
- Matt Sheldon, NFL special assistant
- Jim Vollenweider, former NFL halfback
- Yee Leng Xiong, 38th treasurer of Wisconsin
- Breanna Schneller, murder victim
