= General Baker (disambiguation) =

General Baker (1941–2014) was an American labor organizer and activist. General Baker may also refer to:

== United Kingdom ==
- Arthur Slade Baker (1863–1943), British Army brigadier general
- Geoffrey Baker (British Army officer) (1912–1980), British Army general
- Ian Baker (British Army officer) (1927–2005), British Army major general
- Randolf Baker (1879–1959), British Army lieutenant general
- Thomas Durand Baker (1837–1893), British Army lieutenant general
- William Baker (Indian Army officer) (1888–1964), British Indian Army lieutenant general
- William Erskine Baker (1808–1881), British Indian Army general

== United States ==
- Alpheus Baker (1828–1891), Confederate States Army brigadier general
- Chauncey Brooke Baker (1860–1936), U.S. Army brigadier general
- Henry Moore Baker (1841–1912), New Hampshire National Guard brigadier general
- James H. Baker (politician) (1829–1913), Union Army brevet brigadier general
- Laurence S. Baker (1830–1907), Confederate States Army brigadier general
- Merton W. Baker (1924–2000), U.S. Air Force major general
- Nathaniel B. Baker (1818–1876), Iowa Militia adjutant general
- Ralph Baker (general) (born 1960), U.S. Army brigadier general
- Royal N. Baker (1918–1976), U.S. Air Force lieutenant general
- Thomas Baker (general) (born 1935), U.S. Air Force lieutenant general

== Other ==
- Francisco Reynolds Baker (1882–c. 1967), Argentine Army general
- John Baker (general) (1936–2007), Australian Army general
- Moseley Baker (1802–1848), Republic of Texas militia brigadier general
- Valentine Baker (1827–1887), Egyptian Army lieutenant general
