= KTKV =

KTKV may refer to:

- KTKV-LD, a low-power television station (channel 26) licensed to serve Twin Falls, Idaho, United States; see List of television stations in Idaho
- Tomahawk Regional Airport (ICAO code KTKV)
