= Nightmare Next Door =

American true crime TV series (2011–2016)

- Genre: Documentary
- Narrated by: Greg Diefenbach
- Country of origin: United States
- Original language: English
- No. of seasons: 10
- No. of episodes: 99

Production
- Running time: 43 minutes
- Production company: Sirens Media

Original release
- Network: Investigation Discovery
- Release: January 6, 2011 – November 4, 2016

Nightmare Next Door is a true crime documentary series which aired on Investigation Discovery from 2011 to 2016.

== Synopsis ==
The series (responsible for bringing some crime cases into national attention).

Episodes typically consist of interviews with investigators, prosecutors and family members coupled with re-enactments using actors. The series focuses on crimes that occurred in small American communities.

== Episodes ==
=== Season 1 ===
No. overall	No. in season	Title	Location	Original release date
1	1	Death in Robert's Court	Portsmouth, Virginia	January 6, 2011
16-year-old Megan Landowski was found stabbed to death in her home. Even with DNA and fingerprints the case goes unsolved for months. Until a piece of gum points to an unlikely suspect.
2	2	The Truett Street Massacre	McKinney, Texas	January 13, 2011
McKinney quadruple murder: When 4 people are found dead detectives embark on a three-year investigation. When it seems like the murders may never be solved, an eyewitness breaks the case wide open.
3	3	Killer on South 1200 West	Woods Cross, Utah	January 20, 2011
In 1980, Karin Strom was discovered strangled to death in her home. It took 26 years to ultimately prove who committed this crime.
4	4	North Main Street Mystery	Madisonville, Kentucky	January 27, 2011
85-year-old Anne Branson was discovered stabbed in her basement, with little evidence at the crime scene. Her financial records provide the break for authorities.
5	5	Death on Lake Lynn Drive	Raleigh, North Carolina	February 3, 2011
23-year-old Stephanie Bennett was brutally murdered in her suburban apartment. 3 years into the investigation, a discarded glove identifies her killer. Investigators links the perpetrator to another murder happened in Lansing, Michigan.
6	6	Murder on Hagadom Hill Road	Owego, New York	February 10, 2011
Mother of four Michele Anne Harris vanishes from home. Blood stains found in garage suggests she met a sinister end. Detectives try to solve her case while world focuses on September 11 attacks.

== Season 2 ==
No. overall	No. in season	Title	Location	Original release date
7	1	Murderer in the Midst	North Wales, Pennsylvania	June 9, 2011
A family of four was attacked in home invasion, which led to the death of Robert Chae. Investigators wondered if this is a robbery gone wrong or something more sinister.
8	2	Murder on Main Street	Bloomsbury, New Jersey	June 16, 2011
Monica Massaro was found viciously murdered in her own home. Detectives investigated suitors, local prowlers till a similar attack exposes Adam Leroy Lane.
9	3	Co-Ed Confidential	Las Cruces, New Mexico	June 23, 2011
Katie Sepitch, a New Mexico State University student, was strangled and found at an landfill after a night-out. Detectives tried to find her murderer before another tragedy.
10	4	Sea of Hate	Port Hueneme, California	June 30, 2011
When mother of two Norma Rodriguez’s was found murdered, investigators were left sorting out suspects in its aftermath. After the last lead, Glen Edward Rogers was ruled out the case goes cold for 10 years.
11	5	Death in Santa Barbara	Santa Barbara, California	July 7, 2011
When 27-year-old Jarrod Davidson was gunned down in his apartment doorway, the community fears there's a sniper on the loose. But as detectives dig deeper and uncover a sinister plan from a family.
12	6	No Safe Harbor	Safety Harbor, Florida	July 14, 2011
32-year-old Nikki Halpin was brutally beaten to death in front of her two young sons. When a mysterious voice on the 911 recording reveal an eerie clue, detectives zero in on an unlikely suspect.
13	7	Skeletons in the Closet	Salisbury, North Carolina	July 21, 2011
When 18-year-old Brittany Loritts was found murdered in her home, investigators were at a loss as to who would commit such a heinous crime.

== Season 3 ==
No. overall	No. in season	Title	Location	Original release date
14	1	Fallen Angel	Deerfield Beach, Florida	August 18, 2011
Detectives were stumped when 18-year old Dawnia Dacosta was reported missing by her family. Eventually forensic investigation led them to Lucious Boyd.
15	2	Death in the Family	Palm Harbor, Florida	August 25, 2011
56-year-old David Lunz was gunned down in his home. It took more than two years for officers to prove his on Christopher Lunz was responsible.
16	3	Heartless in the Heartland	Boonville, Missouri	September 1, 2011
The body of 8-year-old Alyssa Owen was found near a rural country road. Six weeks later, her mother Janice’s body turned up in a creek.
17	4	Conspiracy of Evil	Grosse Pointe, Michigan	September 8, 2011
Police used the little evidence they had to catch the killer of 57-year old Barbara Iske who was killed in her driveway.
18	5	Midwestern Malice	Poplar Bluff, Missouri	September 15, 2011
Thirteen years after 31-year-old Laura Wynn was murdered, DNA confirms the killer who lived among the community.

== Season 4 ==
No. overall	No. in season	Title	Location	Original release date
19	1	Recipe for Murder	Wausau, Wisconsin	January 8, 2012
Police hoped a cell phone and surveillance videos can help them unravel the mystery surrounding Breanna Schneller's death.
20	2	House of Horror	Freedom, Pennsylvania	January 15, 2012
Hopes for quick justice murder of Beth Grosskopf are dashed when the initial suspects do not pan out.
21	3	Trouble in Tulsa	Tulsa, Oklahoma	January 29, 2012
In 1975, Jerry Martin was found brutally murdered. It took detectives more than 25 years and new DNA evidence to warm up this cold case.
22	4	The Lady Killer	Portland, Maine	February 12, 2012
When 25-year-old Amy St. Laurent disappeared after a night out, police did not know what to make of it.
23	5	Deadly Disloyalty	Navasota, Texas	February 19, 2012
54-year-old Lonnie Turner Sr. was found shot to dead in his home. Investigators discover this brutal murder may be a family affair.
24	6	TBA	Summerfield, Florida	February 26, 2012
48-year-old Debra Rawls was viscously killed in her home. A speck of blood helped police discovering the identity of the murderer.
25	7	Burning Secret	Goshen, New Hampshire	March 4, 2012
When local resident Edith "Pen" Meyer went missing, her town feared the worst.
26	8	New England Nightmare	Woburn, Massachusetts	March 11, 2012
When Joanne Presti and her young daughter, Alyssa, are found killed, police sift through exes and neighbors to nab their murderer.
27	9	Murder 101	Carbondale, Illinois	March 25, 2012
In 1981, university student 21-year-old Susan Schumake was found strangled to death. With s lack of evidence, the case went cold for 23 years.
28	10	Flames of Passion	Lebanon, Ohio	April 1, 2012
Troy Temar was found dead in the trunk of a car that had been set on fire. After six years of investigation cops finally exposed who was behind this sinister plot.
29	11	Little Girl Lost	Lakewood, Washington	April 8, 2012
In 1996, 9-year-old Cindy Allinger was abducted then killed by a stranger. Police try everything to seek justice for her family.
30	12	Double Murder Inferno	Shoreline, Washington	April 15, 2012
Police officers chased down every lead they got when Renee Powell was found murdered in her apartment.

== Season 5 ==
No. overall	No. in season	Title	Location	Original release date
31	1	One Deadly Night	Marion, North Carolina	June 16, 2012
The gruesome discovery of Zilpha Lowery's sets police off on a wild ride, until a decade old lead helps them catch a killer.
32	2	Writing On the Wall	St. Albans, West Virginia	June 23, 2012
The message of Stacie Ann Smith's murderer at the crime scene baffles investigators while a killer lives in their midst.
33	3	Big Sky Burning	Billings, Montana	June 30, 2012
Peaceful older couple Norm Leighton and Patti Hubbert are violently murdered in their home. Weeks later their missing neighbor Gerald Morris turns up dead outside of town.
34	4	Newlywed Nightmare	Graham, Washington	July 7, 2012
A sleepy town gets a jolt when newlyweds Brian and Beverly Mauck are found shot dead in their home. Cops find out that helpful tipster Daniel Tavares could be their man.
35	5	Hands of Betrayal	Warren, Michigan	July 14, 2012
Charles Taylor's grisly murder has an entire city in disarray. Investigators forced to eliminate a swath of suspects.
36	6	Heartland Homicides	Wichita, Kansas	July 21, 2012
After beloved custodian James Mayberry is found stabbed to death in his home, detectives are stumped until a break comes faster than a prairie tornado.
37	7	Deadly Dealings	Tomahawk, Wisconsin	July 28, 2012
Police have a laundry list of suspects in the case of Tracy Maurer, but it's a tip from the rumor mill that finally brings closure.
38	8	Death Down on the Farm	Everett, Pennsylvania	August 4, 2012
A community's worst fears are realized when the body of Holly Notestine is found deep in a logging forest.
39	9	Silent Night, Violent Night	Hubbardston, Michigan	August 11, 2012
Years pass as police search for a vicious killer of Billie Cunningham, till a confession cracks the case wild open.
40	10	Devils in the Details	Murphysboro, Illinois	April 18, 2012
The murder of single mother Cindy Pavey rattles a tranquil town. It take over a decade to harvest the leads necessary to bring her killer to justice.

== Season 6 ==
No. overall	No. in season	Title	Location	Original release date
41	1	Dead of the Night	Lakeland, Florida	December 3, 2012
Storm clouds brew over the sunshine state, when beloved store manager Mary Peterson is found stabbed to death in her bed.
42	2	Prescription for Murder	Riverton, Wyoming	December 10, 2012
In 2004, prison nurse Tammy Watts was brutally murdered at her workplace.
43	3	Murder on the Menu	Woonsocket, Rhode Island	December 17, 2012
In 1991, Tammy Petrin and Jenner Villeda were found shot execution style at the local Burger King restaurant.
44	4	Wrong Way Home	Springfield, Missouri	December 24, 2012
12-year-old Michelle Winter went missing without a trace from the street from her neighborhood.
45	5	Deadly Intentions	Buffalo, New York	January 7, 2013
The killer of Cynthia Epps eluded capture for nearly two decades but new technology finally put him behind bars.
46	6	Taste of Murder	Tempe, Arizona	January 14, 2013
A sip from the office water cooler turned deadly for secretary Julie Williams. Investigators faced a question: was this a random or a targeted attack?
47	7	Last Call	Jasper, Texas	January 21, 2012
In late 2007, Martin Byerly disappeared without a trace. An unlikely tipster helps police learn what happened to him.
