= Hall L. Brooks =

American politician

Hall L. Brooks was an American politician. He was a member of the Wisconsin State Assembly.

== Biography ==
Brooks was born on October 1, 1864, in Medford, Massachusetts. In the mid-1880s, he moved to Schofield, Wisconsin. He later moved again to Langlade County, Wisconsin before settling in Tomahawk, Wisconsin in 1898. Brooks was a lumberman by trade. In 1891, he married Edith Belanger.

== Political career ==
Brooks was elected to the Assembly in 1904. Additionally, he was a member of the Langlade County board of supervisors and Chairman of the Lincoln County, Wisconsin board of supervisors. He was a Republican.
