= General Reynolds =

General Reynolds may refer to:

- Alexander W. Reynolds (1816/17–1876), Confederate States Army brigadier general
- Daniel H. Reynolds (1832–1902), Confederate States Army brigadier general
- Francisco Reynolds (1852–1923), Argentine Army general
- Gavan Reynolds (fl. 1980s–2020s), Australian Army lieutenant general
- John Reynolds (Illinois politician) (1788–1865), Illinois militia major general during the Black Hawk War
- John F. Reynolds (1820–1863), Union Army major general
- Jon A. Reynolds (fl. 1950s–2000s), U.S. Air Force brigadier general
- Joseph Reynolds (congressman) (1785–1864), New York state militia brigadier general during the War of 1812
- Joseph J. Reynolds (1822–1899), Union Army major general
- Loretta Reynolds (fl. 1980s–2020s), U.S. Marine Corps lieutenant general
- Royal Reynolds Jr. (1910–2003), U.S. Army brigadier general
- Russel Burton Reynolds (1894–), U.S. Army major general

== See also ==
- Attorney General Reynolds (disambiguation)
