= DC Everest Idea School =

D.C. Everest Idea School

Location
- 4704 Camp Phillips Road; Weston, Wisconsin; United States
- Coordinates: 44.9144°N 89.5733°W

Information
- School type: Charter School
- Motto: “The capacity to learn is a gift, the ability to learn is a skill; willingness to learn is a choice.”
- Established: 2011
- Status: Open
- School district: DC Everest Area School District
- Grades: 6-12
- Enrollment: 72
- Colors: Blue and Yellow
- Website: idea.dce.k12.wi.us

D.C. Everest Idea School is a student-directed, project-based charter school in the D.C. Everest School District, Weston, Wisconsin, United States.

== History ==
In 2011, four educators within the D.C. Everest School District established a new school by signing a charter, which aimed to create an alternative approach to teaching. The founding concept of the school centered on fostering a "self-directed environment" intended to cultivate the "next generation of leaders and workers." The primary teaching method adopted by the school is project-based learning, wherein students primarily engage in independent projects to earn academic credits.
