= Ringle (community), Wisconsin =

Ringle, Wisconsin
- Unincorporated community
- Location within Wisconsin Location within the United States
- Coordinates: 44°53′28″N 89°25′32″W
- Country: United States
- State: Wisconsin
- County: Marathon
- Elevation: 1,329 ft (405 m)
- Time zone: UTC-6 (Central (CST))
  - Summer (DST): UTC-5 (CDT)
- ZIP code: 54471
- Area codes: 715 & 534
- GNIS feature ID: 1572328
- Website: https://townofringlewi.com/

Ringle is an unincorporated community located in the town of Ringle, Marathon County, Wisconsin, United States. Ringle is located near Wisconsin Highway 29, 6 miles (9.7 km) east of Weston. Ringle has a post office and a Fire department, with a ZIP code of 54471. On April 17, 2026, an EF3 tornado hit the community and caused damage to homes and minor damage to Riverside Elementary.

== History ==
A post office called Ringle has been in operation since 1891. The community was named for John Ringle, who owned land in the area.
