= McKinney quadruple murder =

2004 mass murder in McKinney, Texas

- Location: McKinney, Texas, US
- Date: March 12, 2004
- Attack type: Home invasion, mass murder, attempted robbery, mass shooting
- Weapon: Firearms
- Deaths: 4
- Perpetrators: Eddie Williams; Javier Cortez; Raul Cortez
- Motive: Robbery

The McKinney quadruple murder, also called the Truett Street massacre, was when four people were gunned down in a house in McKinney, Texas, United States, on March 12, 2004. The incident received notable national coverage on the July 22, 2006, episode of America's Most Wanted, leading to the capture of a suspect.

== Incident ==
On March 12, 2004, Eddie Williams, Javier Cortez, and Raul Cortez entered the home of Rosa Barbosa (46), a clerk at a local McKinney check-cashing business. Javier Cortez had allegedly been watching Barbosa and believed she took cash home from the business daily. When the men couldn't find any money in the home, they forced Barbosa to give them the key and alarm code to the check cashing business. One of the men then shot and killed Barbosa.

Before the shooters could leave, Barbosa's nephew Mark Barbosa (25) entered the home with friends Matt Self (17) and Austin York (18). The three burglars forced Mark Barbosa, Self, and York into a bedroom and shot them before fleeing the scene. Shortly after the botched robbery, Robert Barbosa – Mark Barbosa's brother and a resident in the house – entered the residence to find the four victims. Self was still alive and was rushed to the hospital. He died the following day.

Rosa and Matt were both shot one time each in the head, Mark was once in the head and once in the right arm, and Austin was shot three times.

== Police response ==
One month after the killings, police believed they had solved the case, but soon released the suspects for lack of evidence. It wasn't until several years after the case that the authorities were led to Eddie Williams and the Cortez brothers. Talisha Haithcox, 37, called the police and told them that her boyfriend, Eddie Williams, was involved with the murders of the four victims in McKinney, Texas. McKinney Police Detective Joe Arp eventually gathered DNA evidence that linked Raul Cortez to the crime scene on Truett Street in McKinney, Texas. Investigators collected a cigarette butt from the place where Cortez worked in Florida to use as DNA evidence against the suspect. Also, investigators retrieved DNA evidence from the latex glove pieces and duct tape the suspects left behind in the house on the day of the murders. Arp used the cigarette butt and the latex pieces to cross-reference and the profiles matched.

Williams and Haithcox went to the police station on June 14, 2007, and they cooperated with the police. Williams told police officials that before the shooting, he had been at Raul Cortez's house in McKinney planning to rob Cliff's Checking Cashing business, where Rosa Barbosa was the manager. Williams also stated that while they were planning the robbery, Raul Cortez fired his .25-caliber pistol into the ceiling of his house at 312 South Kentucky Street in McKinney while his brother stood outside to listen and see if he could hear the shot being fired. Police officials recovered fragments of the bullet in the South Kentucky residence and matched those fragments to those removed from victims Mark Barbosa, 25, and Austin York. Williams admitted to shooting Austin York and explained that his main reasoning was that the Cortez brothers would have killed him if he hadn't shot Austin.

Javier Cortez, 31; Raul Cortez, 26; and Eddie Williams were all arrested and charged. Williams pled guilty to three counts of murder in 2010 and was sentenced to 20 years. Raul Cortez was convicted on January 29, 2009, of capital murder and sentenced to death on February 2. Williams's relatively lighter sentence compared to that received by Raul Cortez was justified by his co-operation with police and his history of mental disabilities. Javier Cortez pled guilty to federal weapons charges and was sentenced to four years in prison. Javier served his four-year sentence at the Clements Unit in Amarillo, and was released in January 2011. Raul Cortez is currently serving his sentence at the Allan B. Polunsky Unit in West Livingston, while Williams is currently serving his sentence at the Alfred D. Hughes Unit in Gatesville.

== Legacy ==
Raul Cortez appealed his death sentence to the Texas Supreme Court, but his appeal was rejected in 2011. He subsequently appealed his sentence all the way to the US Supreme Court, but his appeal was rejected in 2017. As of 2023 a date is still yet to be set for his execution. A scholarship fund was raised in the names of the victims of the killings. The killings were also the subject of an episode of the Investigation Discovery channel documentary Nightmare Next Door. The episode first aired in January 2011.
