= Edward W. Whitson =

American politician

Edward W. Whitson was an American politician. He was a member of the Wisconsin State Assembly.

== Biography ==
Whitson was born on Long Island, New York on April 1, 1849. He moved with his parents to Wisconsin in 1851. In 1882, he married Anna D. Jones. They later moved to Merrill, Wisconsin. Whitson was a Congregationalist.

== Career ==
Whitson was elected to the Assembly in 1902. Previously, he had been elected Mayor of Tomahawk, Wisconsin in 1874. He was a Republican.
