= Kara Neumann case =

2013 Wisconsin Supreme Court case

State v. Neumann
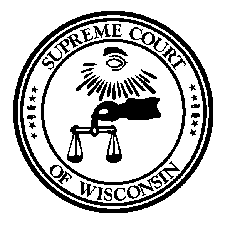
- Court: Wisconsin Supreme Court
- Full case name: State of Wisconsin v. Dale R. Neumann; State of Wisconsin v. Leilani E. Neumann
- Decided: July 3, 2013
- Citation: 2013 WI 58; 348 Wis.2d 455; 832 N.W.2d 560

Case history
- Appealed from: Marathon County Circuit Court
- Argument: [December 4, 2012 Oral argument]

Court membership
- Judges sitting: David Prosser Jr., N. Patrick Crooks, Ann Walsh Bradley, Patience D. Roggensack, Annette Ziegler, Michael Gableman
- Chief judge: Shirley S. Abrahamson

Case opinions
- Decision by: Abrahamson
- Dissent: Prosser

State v. Neumann, 2013 WI 58, 348 Wis.2d 455, 832 N.W.2d 560 (Wis. 2013), was a criminal case centered on the religious parents of a diabetic child who resorted to treating her with faith healing instead of medicine, causing their daughter's death on Easter Sunday in 2008.

== Background ==
Leilani and Dale Neumann of Weston, Wisconsin, parents of 11-year-old Madeline Kara Neumann, were Pentecostals who did not adhere to an organized religion and had ties to Unleavened Bread Ministries, an online religious sect that shunned modern medicine. Although they had received medical care in the past, but by the time of their daughter's death, they both believed there were spiritual causes to illness and that prayer and strong religious beliefs would cure any health issues they encountered. Accordingly, they resolved not to go to doctors for medical treatment out of a belief they would be "putting the doctor before God", an idolatrous act.

In the weeks weeks prior to her death, Kara suffered worsening symptoms of diabetes such as frequent thirst, weakness, and exhaustion. On March 22, 2008, the day before her death, Kara was so ill that she was pale and slept all day. Her legs became blue. Her parents sent mass-emails asking other community members to pray for her as well, saying she was "very weak and pale...with hardly any strength." By that night, Kara was unable to walk and talk and lay completely unresponsive on the couch.

On Sunday morning, Kara was still unresponsive. As visitors came by the house to pray over Kara, she remained in a comatose state. The parents attempted to feed Kara soup and water with a syringe, but the liquid would dribble out of her mouth. Friends and family members suggested Kara be taken to a doctor, but both parents refused. Her grandfather suggested giving the girl Pedialyte, and Leilani said that giving her Pedialyte would take glory away from God. At some point, Dale suggested taking Kara to the hospital, and Leilani told him that Kara's illness was a test of faith for the family, and that God would heal Kara.

By Sunday afternoon, a friend of the Neumanns called 911, fearing Kara had stopped breathing. An aunt from California had also called the local sheriff's office to request a welfare check on her niece, telling the dispatcher that the girl's religious mother was refusing to take Kara to the hospital and saying her niece was "severely, severely sick." By the time the ambulance arrived, Kara had no pulse. Paramedics described Kara as "extremely skinny and malnourished, with a bluish-gray skin color" and "dehydrated and skeleton-like." Paramedics also noticed a sweet smell, a known sign of untreated diabetes. Her blood sugar level was so high that the ambulance monitor could not read it. Kara was transported to the hospital where she was pronounced dead at 3:30pm on March 23, 2008, with her cause of death reported as diabetic ketoacidosis brought on by untreated juvenile-onset diabetes.

Doctors testified that children suffering from diabetic ketoacidosis who are still breathing and still have a heartbeat have a good chance of survival, and that Kara had a strong change of survival "well into the day of her death."

Dale tesified he never knew Kara was close to death, and that after his daughter died, he believed God would bring her back from the dead like Lazarus of Bethany.

The parents were charged with second-degree reckless homicide by the Marathon County district attorney in separate trials. Dale Neumann was convicted on May 22, 2009, and Leilani was convicted on August 1, 2009. On October 6, 2009, both parents were sentenced to 10 years of probation, with six months jail time to be served over a six-year period, but their jail sentence was stayed pending appeal.

== Judgment ==
On appeal, the Neumanns first argued that their conviction violated their due process right to fair notice under the Constitution because the law was too vague and an average person would not be able to know that their behavior violated the statute. In their eyes, a parent using faith healing had not committed any criminal conduct up until the point their child suffers great bodily injury and substantial risk of death: up until the exact moment Kara died. Therefore, because they called 911 as soon as their daughter stopped breathing, they were protected under the prayer-treatment statute. And because they were convicted while believing they were protected, the state did not provide them with fair notice.

There were 4 relevant Wisconsin statutes, including the treatment-through-prayer statute, Wis. Stat. §948.03(6):

"A person is not guilty of an offense under this section solely because he or she provides a child with treatment by spiritual means through prayer alone for healing...or in lieu of medical or surgical treatment."

Under Wisconsin law, Justice Abrahamson explained, this statute was limited only to Christian Science, which the Neumanns did not practice, and was restricted to religious healing methods allowed by the state. Also, §948.03(6) only protected a parent from being charged under criminal child abuse, but it did not immunize the Neumanns from being prosecuted for second-degree reckless homicide, the crime the Neumanns were convicted of. They rejected the Neumann's due process argument and affirmed the lower court in that regard.

The Neumanns' had another main argument that they had a number of erroneous jury instructions and ineffective counsel that biased the jury about a parent's duty to care, a parent's religious beliefs, and Leilani's prior conviction. In response, Abrahamson explained that a parent has a special legal duty to protect their child under Wisconsin common law, and that failing to provide medical care fell under that duty.

Their third argument was based in the constitutional fundamental right for a parent to direct the care of their child. The Neumanns asserted that imposing a legal duty on a parent to provide medical care violates that constitutional right, and that the jury instructions failed to reflect that. The court rejected this argument, reiterating the Prince v. Massachusetts Supreme Court decision establishing that a parent's right to authority over their child is limited.

"The freedom to practice religion freely does not include liberty to expose the community or the child to communicable disease or the latter to ill health or death... Parents may be free to become martyrs themselves. But it does not follow they are free...to make martyrs of their children..."

Justice Abrahamson agreed and held the relevant jury instructions aligned with the Supreme Court decision.

The Neumann's fourth argument was based in the same constitutional right for a parent to direct their child's case and again in reference to the jury instructions. This time, they argued the instructions failed to show that prayer treatment was sufficient medical care under Wisconsin law, and that until Kara stopped breathing, they lawfully compied by providing her a version of medical care: prayer. The court disagreed. Their fifth argument was similar, based on jury instructions on religious belief, which the court dismissed.

The Neumanns also argued that to be found guilty, they would have had to know their conduct was causing Kara great bodily harm, not just that she was experiencing great bodily harm, and that they could not be aware they were causing her harm if they believed their prayer was healing. The court rejected this argument.

There was also some debate over if Leilani being found guilty and Dale's jurors learning of the guilty verdict biased Dale's trial, but the court dismissed it.

On July 3, 2013, by a 6-to-1 margin the Wisconsin Supreme Court affirmed the lower court's decision and upheld the Neumanns' convictions.

=== Dissent ===
Justice Prosser argued that the statement of facts read in the majority opinion were biased. He wrote at length about the unpredictability and dangers of diabetes and compared the Neumanns' case to Maurin v. Hall, a medical malpractice case about a 5-year-old that similarly died of diabetic ketoacidosis whose symptoms were dismissed by a physician. Justice Prosser also sided with the parents that the statutes were confusing and "murky." He argued there was uncertainty about when a faith-healing parent would be immune to prosecution under the relevant statutes. He also agreed that the jury instructions were inconsistent and did not make sufficient reference to the Neumanns' religious beliefs or handle Leilani's conviction properly.

== Significance ==
Kara Neumann's death and the subsequent trial brought a wave of conversation about the dangers of faith healing and pediatric health care across the country. Ambiguity in religious exemption laws for child abuse has overturned convictions in similar cases.
