= David Claerbaut =

American sports writer (born 1946)

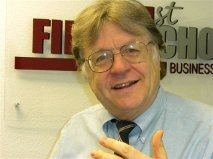
- Claerbaut in 2012
- Born: February 27, 1946 (age 80); Tomahawk, Wisconsin, U.S.
- Occupations: Professor, author, athletic administrator, psychotherapist, and business broker
- Notable work: Bart Starr: When Leadership Mattered, The NBA Analyst, Recruiting Confidential: A Father, A Son, and Big Time College Football
- Spouse: Rita
- Website: www.highschoolhoopsdoc.com

David Claerbaut (born February 27, 1946) is a professor, coach, and athletic administrator, psychotherapist, and author. He earned a PhD from the Loyola University of Chicago.

== Early years ==
Claerbaut was born in Tomahawk, Wisconsin and grew up in Cedar Grove, Wisconsin. He began his career as an inner-city schoolteacher in Grand Rapids, Michigan, but soon moved on to North Park University in Chicago. There he held a dual appointment in sociology and psychology also serving as Chair of the Sociology/Anthropology Department. Claerbaut taught at Loyola and DePaul Universities and lectured at the University of Chicago on medical sociology. While at North Park, he published a number of popular and scholarly books. He also served as President of the Oak Therapeutic School Board (a private facility for behaviorally disordered children) and Chair of the Cabrini Legal Aid Clinic (a private law office serving the needs of Chicago's indigent).

== Career ==
During his time at North Park, Claerbaut served as the school's athletic director in 1986. The school won the NCAA basketball championship in 1987 under Claerbaut's athletic direction. Later in 2005, Claerbaut moved to South Haven, Michigan, where he served as assistant director and head boys basketball coach at a private Christian school. In his two years there, his teams won the only two basketball championships in the school's league history. In 2008, Claerbaut moved to Las Vegas where he was brought in as head boys basketball coach at Andre Agassi College Preparatory School. It was the school's first year in the state association (NIAA). His team won the South Regional championship and made it to the state championship game, losing by just three points. Most recently he has begun a website www.highschoolhoopsdoc.com, which offers services for girls and boys basketball coaches. He has developed a statistical system for girls and boys high school basketball that can be used to analyze a team's strengths and weaknesses on its statistics alone. A devotee of Bill James’ baseball sabermetrics, Claerbaut first developed basketball metrics described in his book, The NBA Analyst, and then moved on to devise a statistical system usable at the high school level.

One of Claerbaut's sons, a football running back was recruited by over 40 major colleges. Claerbaut's book, Recruiting Confidential, describes his and his son's experience. Claerbaut has also written a number of other popular adult sports books, one of which is Bart Starr: When Leadership Mattered In 2023, his book Duffy Daugherty: A Man Ahead of His Time was withdrawn by Michigan State University, the publisher, after a controversy erupted over the citations were possibly inaccurate.

While at North Park University, Claerbaut opened a private counseling service. He was also a radio psychologist on Chicago's WIND-AM and WGN-AM. Focusing on sports psychology and performance, he worked with a number of major league baseball players during this time. His book, Liberation from Loneliness, chronicles some of this experience.

Academically, Claerbaut developed a particular interest in Christian scholarship, following many of the ideas of Nicholas Wolterstorff and George Marsden. His book, Faith and Learning on the Edge, investigates the role of religion in higher education.

== List of published works ==
- "Recruiting Confidential: A Father, A Son, and Big Time College Football"
- "The NBA Analyst"
- "Durocher’s Cubs: The Greatest Team that Never Won
- "Bart Starr: When Leadership Mattered"
- "(St. Louis) Cardinals Essential"
- "(Chicago) Bears Essential"
- "Faith And Learning On The Edge: A Bold New Look at Religion in Higher Education"
- "Urban Ministry"
- "Urban Ministry In The New Millennium"
- "The Reluctant Defender"
- "Black Student Alienation"
- "Black Jargon In White America"
- "Social Problems, Vol. I & II"
- "New Directions In Ethnic Studies System" (Editor)
- "American Ethnic Revival" (Editor)
- "Liberation From Loneliness"
