= Attorney General Reynolds =

Attorney General Reynolds may refer to:

- John W. Reynolds Jr. (1921–2002), Attorney General of Wisconsin
- John W. Reynolds Sr. (1876–1958), Attorney General of Wisconsin
- Robert Reynolds (MP) (1601–1678), Attorney General for England and Wales

== See also ==
- General Reynolds (disambiguation)
