= Schofield, Wisconsin =

- City
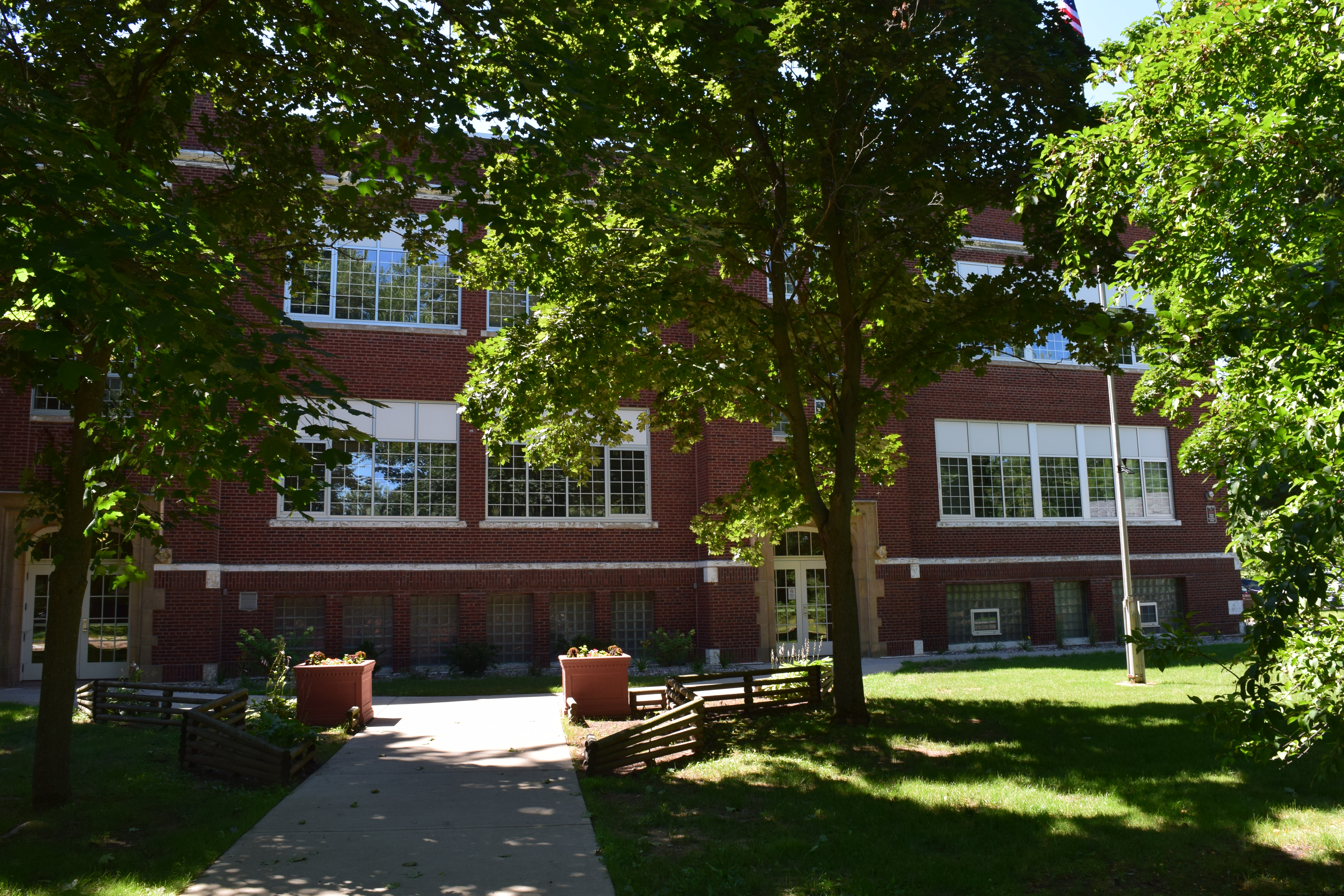
- Former Schofield School in Schofield

- Location of Schofield in Marathon County, Wisconsin.

- Location within Wisconsin Location within the United States
- Coordinates: 44°54′55″N 89°36′43″W
- Country: United States
- State: Wisconsin
- County: Marathon

Area
  - Total: 2.99 sq mi (7.74 km^{2})
  - Land: 2.12 sq mi (5.48 km^{2})
  - Water: 0.87 sq mi (2.26 km^{2})
- Elevation: 1,201 ft (366 m)

Population (2020)
  - Total: 2,157
  - Density: 1,024.0/sq mi (395.35/km^{2})
- Time zone: UTC-6 (Central (CST))
  - Summer (DST): UTC-5 (CDT)
- Area codes: 715 & 534
- FIPS code: 55-72150
- GNIS feature ID: 1573796
- Website: www.schofieldwi.gov

Schofield is a city in Marathon County, Wisconsin, United States. It is part of the Wausau, Wisconsin Metropolitan Statistical Area. The population was 2,157 at the 2020 census. The city was named for William Scholfield, who came to the area in the 1851 to open a sawmill. The city has since dropped the "L" from its name.

== Geography ==
Schofield is located along the eastern shore of Lake Wausau, an impoundment of the Wisconsin River. Schofield also contains the Eau Claire Flowage and Eau Claire River (not to be confused with the Eau Claire River of Eau Claire, WI), which flows into Lake Wausau at Schofield. Schofield is directly south of Wausau, and is generally separated from the city by the Wausau Downtown Airport. An inner suburb of Wausau, Schofield is bordered by Rothschild, Weston, and the Town of Weston. Lake Wausau and Wausau serve as its western and northern borders. Schofield is located at 44°54′55″N 89°36′43″W (44.915201, -89.612004).

According to the United States Census Bureau, the city has a total area of 2.83 square miles (7.33 km^{2}), of which 1.76 square miles (4.56 km^{2}) is land and 1.07 square miles (2.77 km^{2}) is water.

== Demographics ==
Historical population
Census	Pop.	Note	%±
1910	889		—
1920	1,049		18.0%
1930	1,287		22.7%
1940	1,536		19.3%
1950	1,948		26.8%
1960	3,038		56.0%
1970	2,577		−15.2%
1980	2,226		−13.6%
1990	2,415		8.5%
2000	2,117		−12.3%
2010	2,169		2.5%
2020	2,157		−0.6%
U.S. Decennial Census

=== 2010 census ===
As of the census of 2010, there were 2,169 people, 994 households, and 549 families living in the city. The population density was 1,232.4 inhabitants per square mile (475.8/km^{2}). There were 1,099 housing units at an average density of 624.4 per square mile (241.1/km^{2}). The racial makeup of the city was 90.1% White, 1.2% African American, 0.8% Native American, 5.5% Asian, 0.2% from other races, and 2.2% from two or more races. Hispanic or Latino of any race were 1.8% of the population.

There were 994 households, of which 25.3% had children under the age of 18 living with them, 38.3% were married couples living together, 10.8% had a female householder with no husband present, 6.1% had a male householder with no wife present, and 44.8% were non-families. 36.6% of all households were made up of individuals, and 12.5% had someone living alone who was 65 years of age or older. The average household size was 2.18 and the average family size was 2.84.

The median age in the city was 39.1 years. 21.8% of residents were under the age of 18; 8.8% were between the ages of 18 and 24; 28% were from 25 to 44; 26.5% were from 45 to 64; and 14.8% were 65 years of age or older. The gender makeup of the city was 51.7% male and 48.3% female.

=== 2000 census ===
As of the census of 2000, there were 2,117 people, 965 households, and 551 families living in the city. The population density was 1,204.4 people per square mile (465.0 people/km^{2}). There were 1,022 housing units at an average density of 581.4 per square mile (224.5/km^{2}). The racial makeup of the city was 95.65% White, 0.38% African American, 0.28% Native American, 2.17% Asian, 0.05% Pacific Islander, 0.57% from other races, and 0.90% from two or more races. Hispanic or Latino of any race were 1.32% of the population.

There were 965 households, out of which 23.6% had children under the age of 18 living with them, 43.7% were married couples living together, 9.5% had a female householder with no husband present, and 42.8% were non-families. 34.4% of all households were made up of individuals, and 11.5% had someone living alone who was 65 years of age or older. The average household size was 2.19 and the average family size was 2.86.

In the city, the population was spread out, with 21.3% under the age of 18, 9.3% from 18 to 24, 31.6% from 25 to 44, 22.3% from 45 to 64, and 15.5% who were 65 years of age or older. The median age was 37 years. For every 100 females, there were 102.4 males. For every 100 females age 18 and over, there were 103.7 males.

The median income for a household in the city was $38,158, and the median income for a family was $50,850. Males had a median income of $32,765 versus $24,932 for females. The per capita income for the city was $20,287. About 6.3% of families and 7.3% of the population were below the poverty line, including 12.0% of those under age 18 and 16.2% of those age 65 or over.

== Transportation ==
=== Airport ===
The Central Wisconsin Airport (KCWA) serves Schofield, the county and surrounding communities with both scheduled commercial jet service and general aviation services.
