= Murder of Breanna Schneller =

Murder of American high school student

Murder Of Breanna Schneller
- Undated photo of Schneller
- Location: Wausau, Wisconsin
- Date: May 2, 2009 (Central Standard Time)
- Attack type: Homicide by stabbing, beating
- Weapons: iron, kitchen knives
- Victim: Breanna Marie Schneller
- Perpetrator: Raul Ponce-Rocha
- Motive: Unclear
- Verdict: Guilty
- Convictions: First-degree intentional homicide, burglary with a dangerous weapon, two counts of misdemeanor theft
- Judge: Patrick Brady

Breanna Marie Schneller was a high school senior living in Wisconsin who was murdered by Raul Ponce-Rocha, a worker at El Tequila Salsa in Rib Mountain. (Note: Worked with Breanna's fiancé Sebastian Ramirez, and brother Hugo Ramirez)

== Personal life ==
Breanna Schneller was born to Craig and Lori Schneller on August 14, 1990, in Wausau, Wisconsin. She was a senior at D.C Everest and a month away from graduation. Schneller was also about to be married to then fiancée Sebastian Ramirez. She was remembered to have loved Mexican food, music, dancing, and riding rollercoasters. Breanna planned on taking a college class for restaurant management. (Note: According to her obituary on Legacy.com)

== Murder ==
On May 2, 2009, Schneller was in her apartment living with Sebastian and Hugo Ramirez on 12th Avenue in Wausau. At around 10 AM both had to head to work at El Tequila. Later, Hugo came back from break and discovered her body in a pool of blood. Ramirez went to a neighbor's apartment and told them to call the police. Detectives arrived and believed she had lain there for some time.

Investigators found bloody knives in the bathroom and a household iron that was used to beat her. They also found a shoe print similar to what Raul Ponce-Rocha was wearing that day.

According to coroners, she was brutally beaten and stabbed multiple times in the chest, neck, and wrist.

When police interviewed Ponce-Rocha, he said he saw her texting on the day of the attack. The police, realizing her phone was missing, and the Department of Criminal Investigation used GPS equipment to retrieve the phone, which was discovered inside a bag behind the restaurant where Ponce-Rocha worked. They also discovered two pairs of underwear and two mismatched gloves with blood on them.

Ponce-Rocha was called in for questioning, and stated that he had nothing to do with the attack and that he was grabbing his co-worker Sanchez-Ramos.

Surveillance video showed Ponce-Rocha leaving around 10:19 AM, and not returning until 10:53.

Police arrested him for first-degree intentional homicide after finding his DNA on the murder weapon.

== Aftermath ==
After the trials, Craig Schneller stated "Everybody that was on this case has family and they have kids, and so it became a personal issue for a lot of them." Since then he has become a public speaker with the help of the Breanna Smile Foundation and carries Breanna's last Father's Day card with him. Craig has since moved out of the Wausau area.

Raul Ponce-Rocha was found guilty of the murder and is currently serving life in prison.

== In popular culture ==
=== Television ===
"Recipe For Murder," the first episode for season 4 was aired on January 8, 2012, for the documentary series Nightmare Next Door, airing on Investigation Discovery. Actress Virginia Coffield played Schneller.

On April 28, 2019, Investigation Discovery aired 'Deviant Deeds' on season 2, episode 3, for the documentary show, Murder in the Heartland. Craig Schneller was also a part of the episode.
