= Robert W. Dean =

American politician

Robert W. Dean (June 11, 1923 – November 10, 1987) was an American judge and legislator from Wisconsin.

== Biography ==
Born in Tomahawk, Wisconsin, Dean received his bachelor's degree and law degrees from the University of Wisconsin–Madison. During World War II, he served in the United States Army Air Forces. After college, he moved to Wausau, Wisconsin to practice law. From 1959 to 1962, he served in the Wisconsin State Senate and in 1962 was appointed a Wisconsin Circuit Court judge. From 1978 until his retirement in 1986, he served in the Wisconsin Court of Appeals.
