= Tomahawk, Wisconsin =

City in the United States

- City
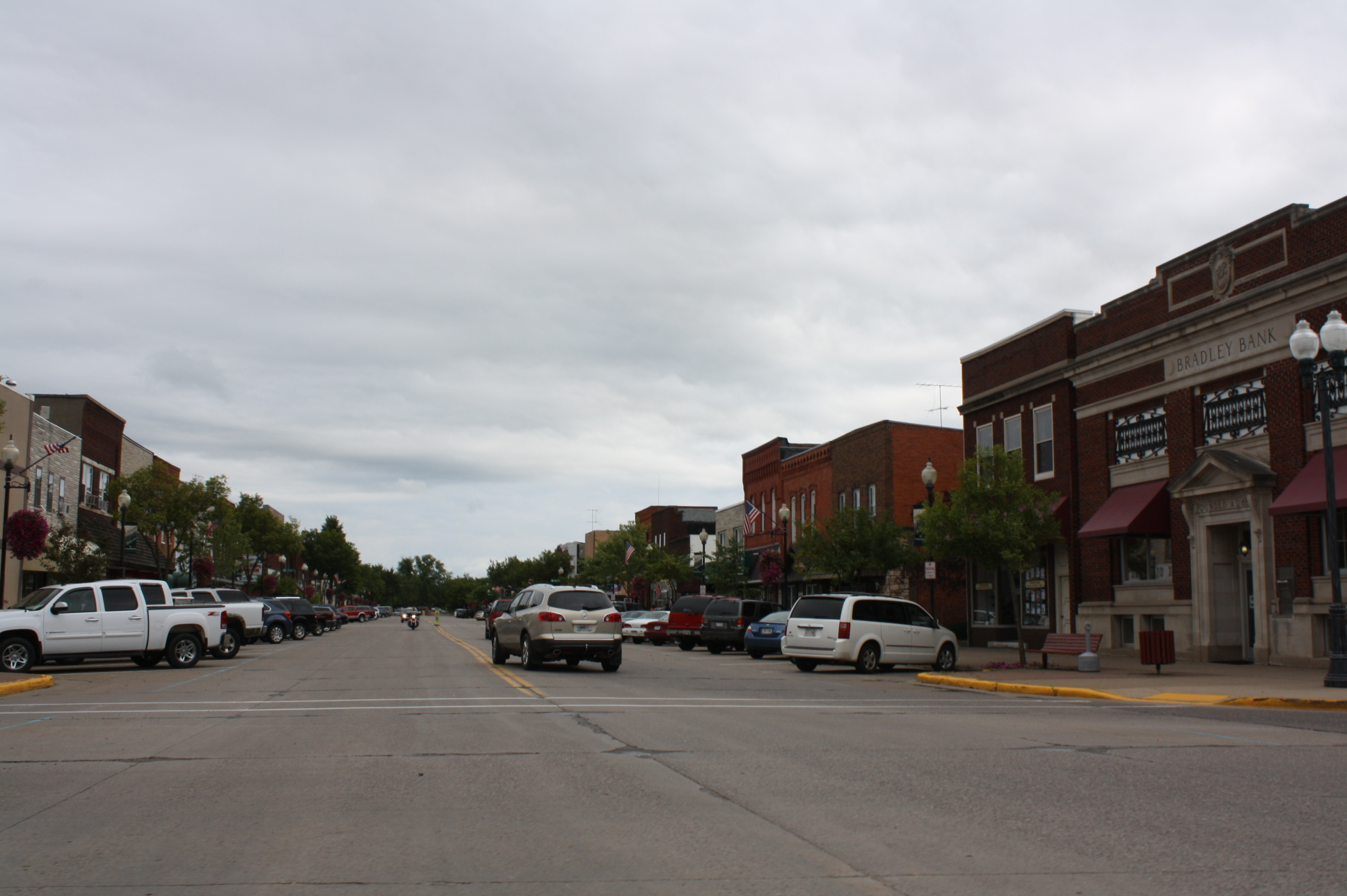
- Looking east in downtown Tomahawk

- Location of Tomahawk in Lincoln County, Wisconsin

- Location within Wisconsin Location within the United States
- Coordinates: 45°28′28″N 89°43′53″W
- Country: United States
- State: Wisconsin
- County: Lincoln

Government
  - Mayor: Steven E. Taskay

Area
  - Total: 9.46 sq mi (24.50 km^{2})
  - Land: 7.85 sq mi (20.34 km^{2})
  - Water: 1.61 sq mi (4.16 km^{2})

Population (2020)
  - Total: 3,441
  - Density: 433/sq mi (167.2/km^{2})
- Time zone: UTC-6 (Central (CST))
  - Summer (DST): UTC-5 (CDT)
- ZIP codes: 54487
- Area codes: 715 & 534
- FIPS code: 55-80125
- Website: www.cityoftomahawkwi.com

Tomahawk is a city in Lincoln County, Wisconsin, United States. The population was 3,441 at the 2020 census. The city is located to the northeast of the Town of Tomahawk and is not contiguous with it.

== History ==
Before 1837, the land where Tomahawk is now situated belonged to the Ojibwe, who traded actively with fur traders such as the American Fur Company and the Northwest Company. After the 1837 cession, the practical situation changed only slightly: the federal survey teams had not arrived yet, logging activity was still light, and Ojibwe continued to actively occupy the general area. There was a village just north of the modern Tomahawk, in the vicinity of modern Bradley, and a village on Skanawan Creek. The 1854 Treaty of La Pointe created the reservations at Lac du Flambeau, Lac Courte Oreilles and Bad River. Even after this treaty, the region was largely public domain land and the treaties allowed the Ojibwe usufructory rights to hunt, fish, gather wild rice and make maple sugar. Some Ojibwe received their annuity payments in Wausau until the payments ended in 1874. By that time most Ojibwe were living permanently on the reservations.

Logging activity from the Tomahawk River upstream began about 1860 and surged after the Civil War. By 1880 several families were living close to Tomahawk-Wisconsin river confluence, including owning property within the present city limits of Tomahawk. The location was variously known as Bouchard's Station or The Forks, short for Forks of the Wisconsin.

Tomahawk traditionally traces its founding to the establishment of the construction camps for a dam and the railroad in 1886. The company leading the effort was the Tomahawk Land and Boom Company, headed by William H. Bradley, who is thus considered to be the principal founder of Tomahawk. The Tomahawk Land and Boom Company was owned 51 percent by the Chicago, Milwaukee and Saint Paul railroad, and 49 percent by the Land, Log and Lumber Company (Bradley and his partners). The dam was a large capital investment for the era, and was one of the largest in the world when it was completed. The town site was platted in 1887, with lots sold in Milwaukee that summer. The agent for the sale was Henry Payne. The city was incorporated in 1891. In the 10 years after the first construction camps were built, Tomahawk grew rapidly, boasting many stores, a three-story hotel, many saw mills, a paper mill, and service via three railroads.

Among the events highlighting Tomahawk's history since that time are:

- 1897: The first high school class graduated; among the graduates was Margaret McBride, who achieved prominence as a vocalist in New York City.
- 1906: William T. Bradley, future mayor and adopted son of the city's founder, brought the first automobile to the town.
- 1914: The first airplane landed on north Tomahawk Avenue, there being no other runway then.
- 1917: Tomahawk men enlisted and formed Company A, 119th Machine Gun Battalion, which was deployed to Europe via Waco, Texas.
- 1929: The iconic Mitchell Hotel burned down, nearly taking the entire downtown with it. A new pump brought in from the Phillips fire department was the only thing that saved the day.
- 1936: Tomahawk celebrated its 50th anniversary. The activities included a visit by Governor Philip La Follette.
- 1941: The United States declared war on Japan, and many Tomahawk young men and women enlisted in military and other service.
- 1951: Einar Ingman was awarded the Medal of Honor for valor in Korea.
- 1976: Governor Patrick Lucey visited to simultaneously dedicate a large new paper machine at the kraft mill (then owned by Owens-Illinois) as well as Highway 86 bridge.
- 1986: Tomahawk celebrated its 100th anniversary.

=== Frenchtown ===
A neighborhood in the southern part of the city is known as "Frenchtown" or "French Town". The origins of its name remain unclear. However, among Tomahawk's original settlers were many French speakers, from Canada as well as elsewhere in the United States, including Germain Bourchard, as well as early property owners such as Albert King and Gilbert Vallier.

== Geography ==
Tomahawk is located at 45°28′28″N 89°43′53″W (45.474463, -89.731454).

According to the United States Census Bureau, the city has a total area of 9.34 square miles (24.19 km^{2}), of which 7.76 square miles (20.10 km^{2}) is land and 1.58 square miles (4.09 km^{2}) is water.

Tomahawk lies at an elbow-shaped bend in the Wisconsin River. There the water is dammed, forming Lake Mohawksin. Mohawksin is a concatenation of the last syllable of the three rivers that flow into it – the Somo, the Tomahawk and the Wisconsin.

=== Climate ===
The Köppen Climate Classification subtype for this climate is "Dfb" (Warm Summer Continental Climate).

== Demographics ==
Historical population
Census	Pop.	Note	%±
1890	1,816		—
1900	2,291		26.2%
1910	2,907		26.9%
1920	2,898		−0.3%
1930	2,919		0.7%
1940	3,365		15.3%
1950	3,534		5.0%
1960	3,348		−5.3%
1970	3,419		2.1%
1980	3,527		3.2%
1990	3,328		−5.6%
2000	3,770		13.3%
2010	3,397		−9.9%
2020	3,441		1.3%
U.S. Decennial Census

=== 2010 census ===
At the 2010 census, there were 3,397 people, 1,480 households and 875 families in the city. The population density was 437.8 per square mile (169.0/km^{2}). There were 1,742 housing units at an average density of 224.5 per square mile (86.7/km^{2}). The racial makeup was 96.8% White, 0.2% African American, 0.7% Native American, 0.6% Asian, 0.2% from other races, and 1.5% from two or more races. Hispanic or Latino people of any race were 1% of the population.

There were 1,480 households, of which 28.1% had children under the age of 18 living with them, 43% were married couples living together, 10.7% had a female householder with no husband present, 5.3% had a male householder with no wife present, and 40.9% were non-families. 34.8% of all households were made up of individuals, and 15.1% had someone living alone who was 65 years of age or older. The average household size was 2.20 and the average family size was 2.81.

The median age was 44.8 years. 21.5% of residents were under the age of 18; 6.8% were between the ages of 18 and 24; 22% were from 25 to 44; 28.7% were from 45 to 64; and 21.1% were 65 years of age or older. The gender makeup was 47.5% male and 52.5% female.

=== 2000 census ===
At the 2000 census, there were 3,770 people, 1,527 households and 957 families residing in the city. The population density was 506.8 per square mile (195.6/km^{2}). There were 1,696 housing units at an average density of 228 per square mile (88/km^{2}). The racial makeup was 97.98% White, 0.05% Black or African American, 0.64% Native American, 0.66% Asian, 0.03% Pacific Islander, 0.21% from other races, and 0.42% from two or more races. 0.77% of the population were Hispanic or Latino of any race.

There were 1,527 households, of which 30.3% had children under the age of 18 living with them, 49.1% were married couples living together, 10.5% had a female householder with no husband present, and 37.3% were non-families. 32.5% of all households were made up of individuals, and 16.2% had someone living alone who was 65 years of age or older. The average household size was 2.36 and the average family size was 2.99.

25.1% of the population were under the age of 18, 7% from 18 to 24, 27.1% from 25 to 44, 20.3% from 45 to 64, and 20.5% who were 65 years of age or older. The median age was 39 years. For every 100 females, there were 88.9 males. For every 100 females age 18 and over, there were 87 males.

The median household income was $33,986 and the median family income was $42,333. Males had a median income of $36,042 and females $20,625. The per capita income was $17,277. About 7.1% of families and 7.9% of the population were below the poverty line, including 9.2% of those under age 18 and 4.9% of those age 65 or over.

== Transportation ==
=== Airports ===
Tomahawk is served by the Tomahawk Regional Airport (KTKV). Located three miles west of the city, the airport handles approximately 7,200 operations per year, with roughly 97% general aviation and 3% air taxi. The airport has a 4,401 foot asphalt runway with approved GPS approaches (Runway 9-27).

The Rhinelander-Oneida County Airport (KRHI) serves Tomahawk and surrounding communities with both scheduled commercial jet service and general aviation services.

== Education ==
Tomahawk is served by the Tomahawk School District and its three public schools:

- Tomahawk Elementary School
- Tomahawk Middle School
- Tomahawk High School

There is also a Catholic school: St. Mary's Catholic School.

== Recreation ==
Tomahawk hosts many activities and events, especially in the summer. Among the events are:

- The Tomahawk Fall Ride
- Pow-wow Days (Independence Day celebration)

Tomahawk is home to the Kwahamot Water Ski Club, who perform regularly throughout the summer and periodically host competitive events.

== Notable people ==
- Merton W. Baker, U.S. Air Force major general
- Hall L. Brooks, Wisconsin State Representative
- David Claerbaut, educator
- Robert W. Dean, jurist and legislator
- Carl Eklund, polar scientist and Antarctic explorer
- Laurence Eklund, journalist, Milwaukee Journal Washington bureau chief 1947-1970
- Mary Felzkowski, 35th District Member of the Assembly
- Einar H. Ingman, Jr. U.S. Army Medal of Honor, Korea
- Jay Leggett, TV and film personality, screenwriter and filmmaker
- Pickles the Drummer, drummer for death metal band Dethklok
- H. T. Webster, syndicated cartoonist and creator of Caspar Milquetoast
- Mike Webster, football player, inducted into the Pro Football Hall of Fame
- Edward W. Whitson, Wisconsin State Representative

== In popular culture ==
- Pickles the Drummer, drummer for the virtual death metal band Dethklok and the animated series Metalocalypse, was raised in Tomahawk.

== Images ==
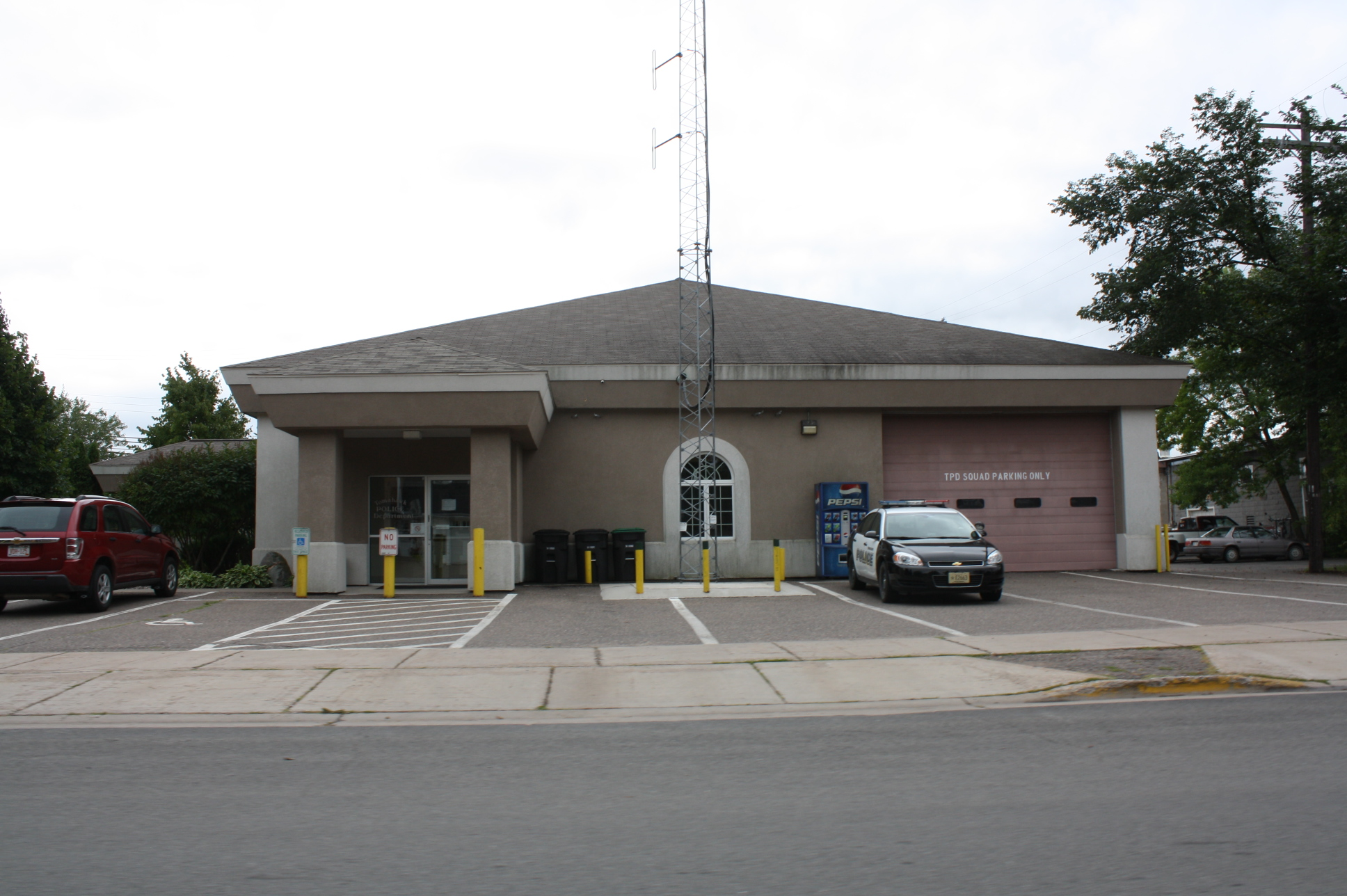
City hall / police station

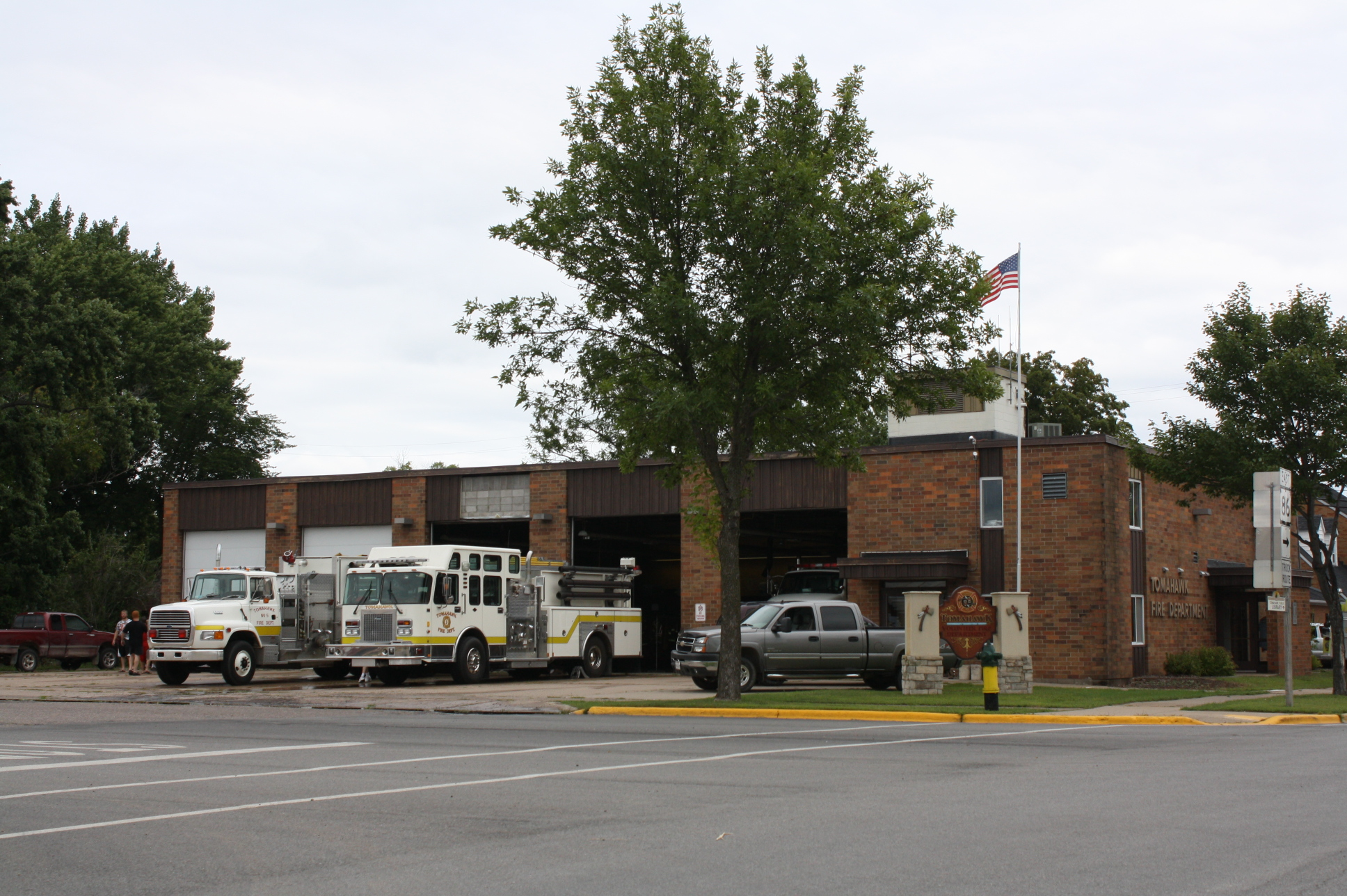
Fire station

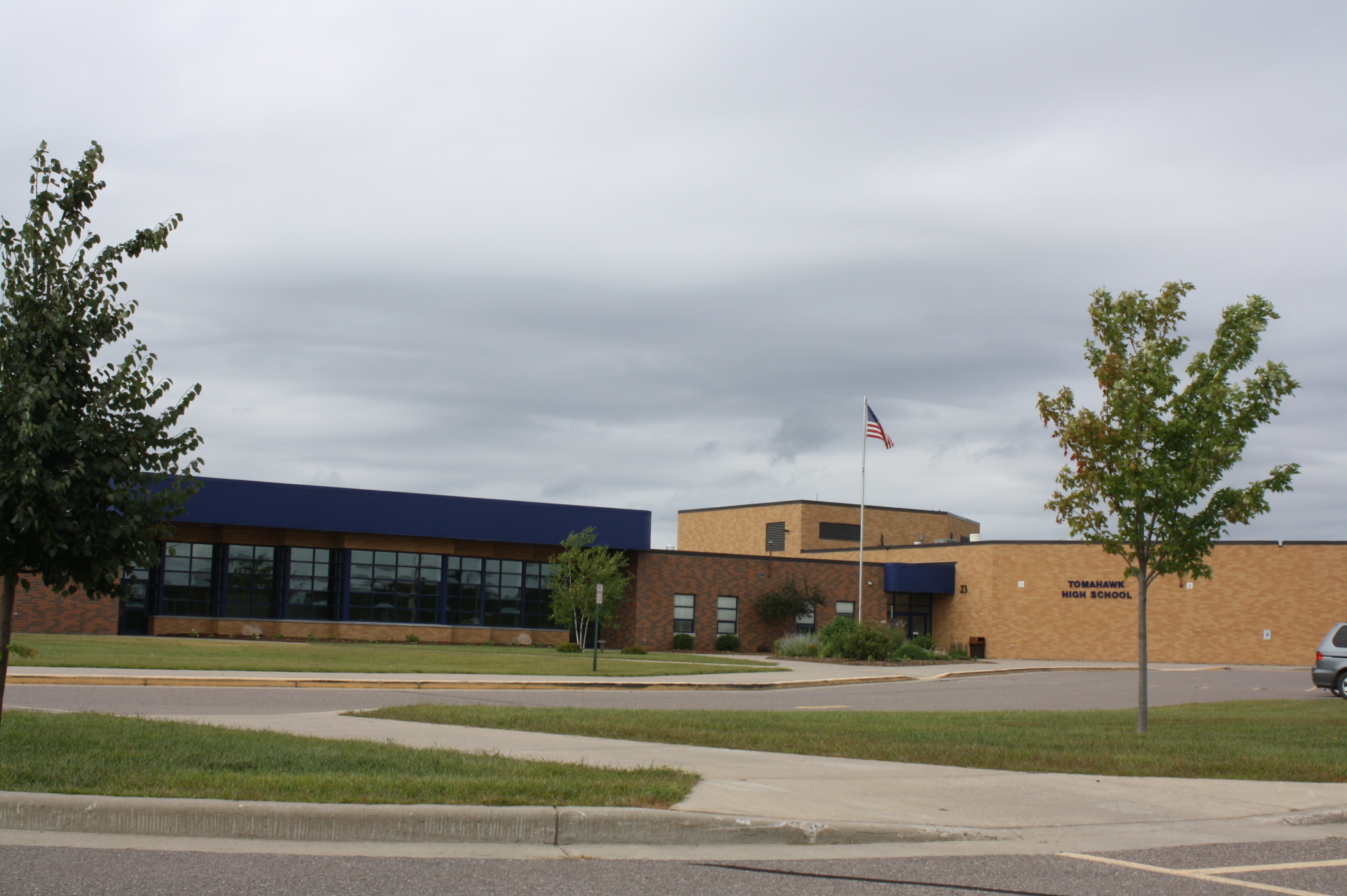
Tomahawk High School

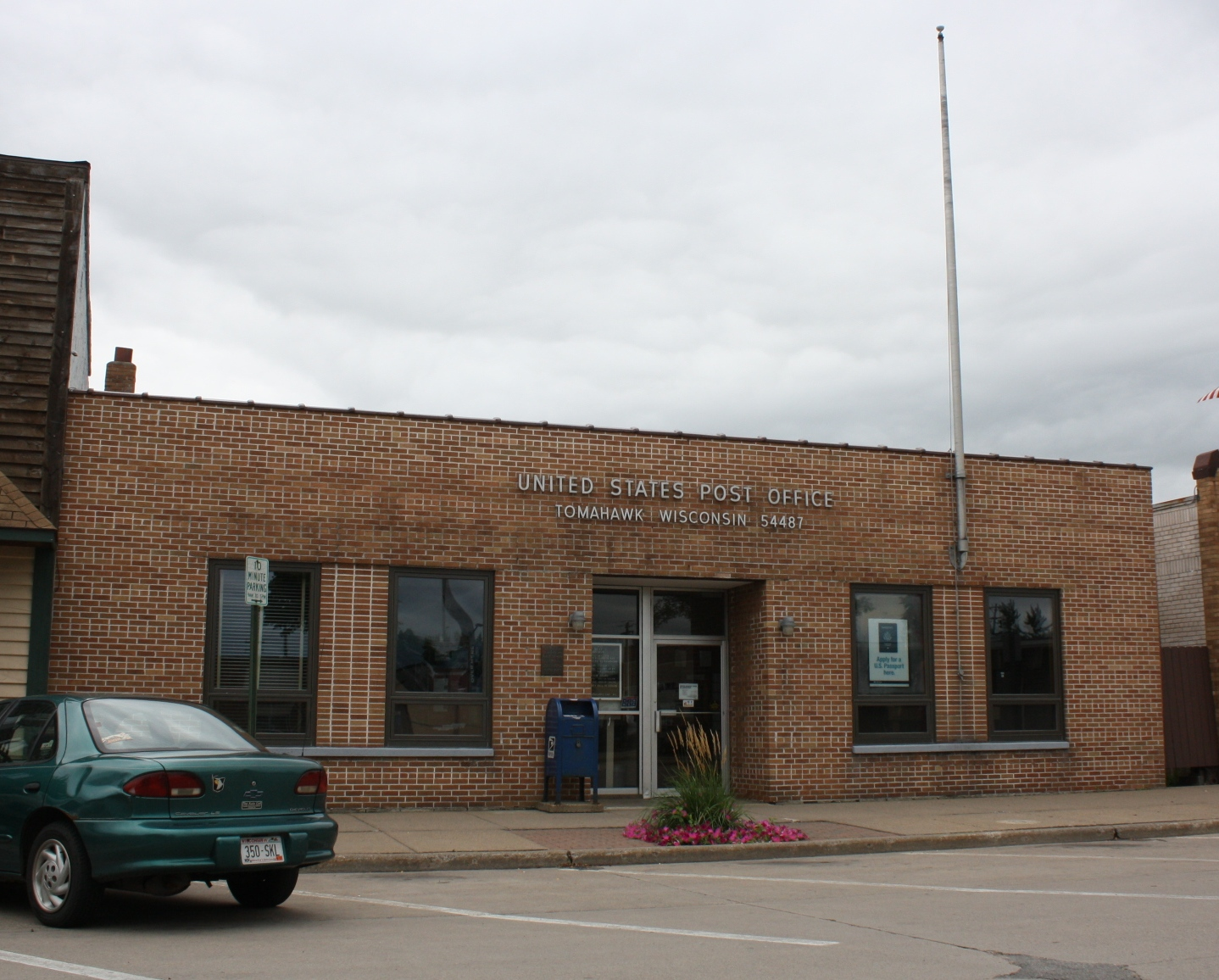
Post office

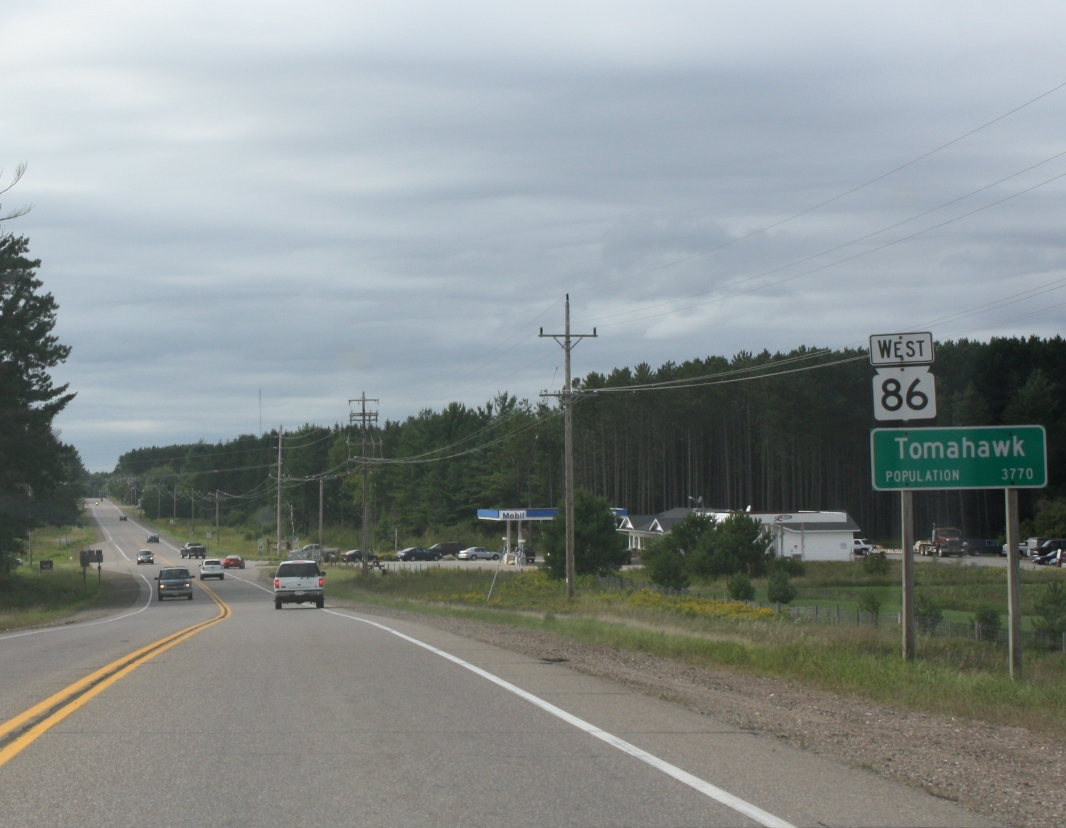
Welcome sign on WIS 86

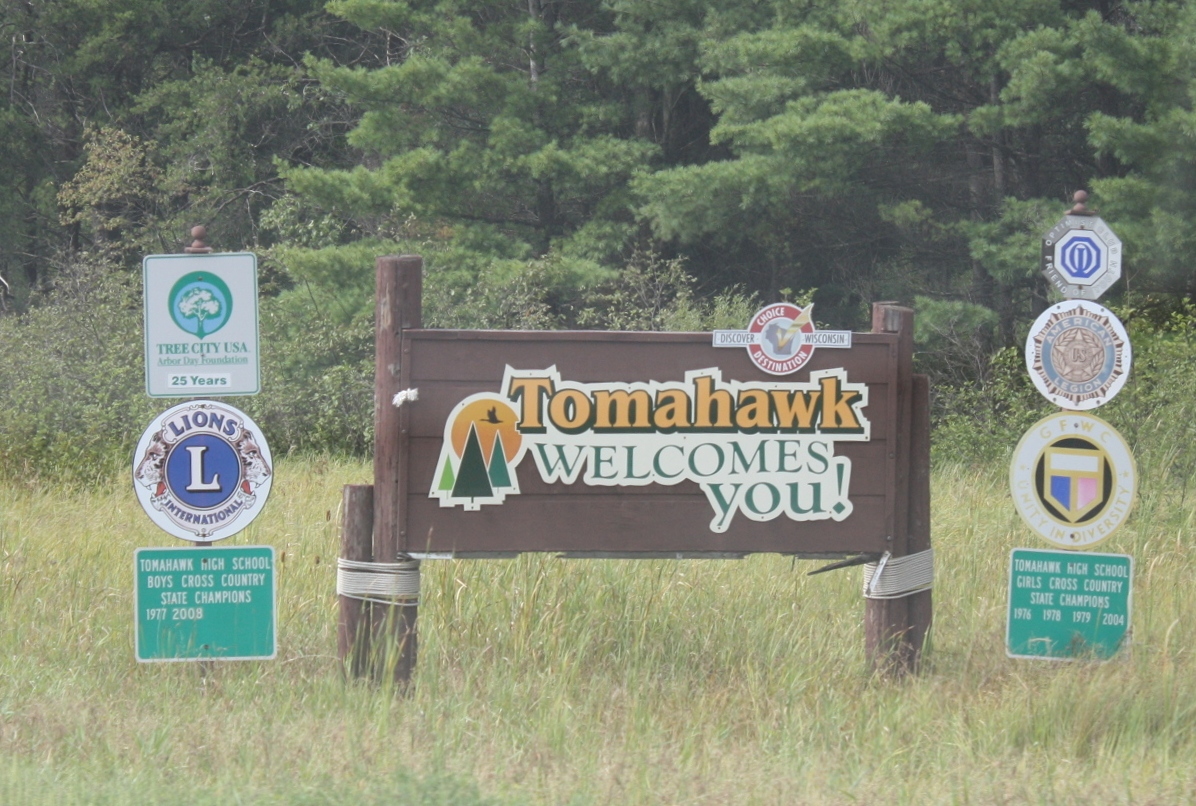
City welcome sign

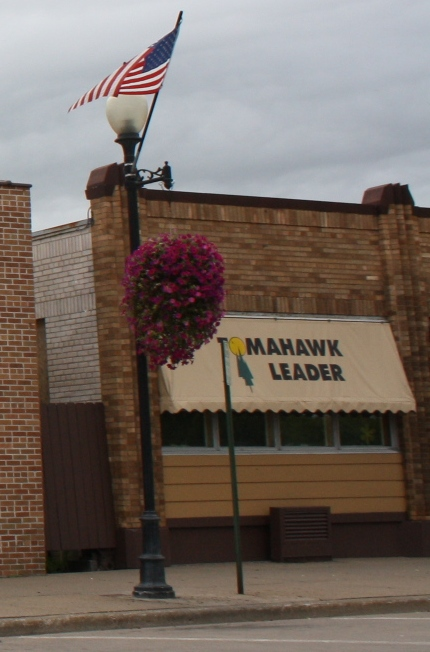
Tomahawk Leader newspaper building

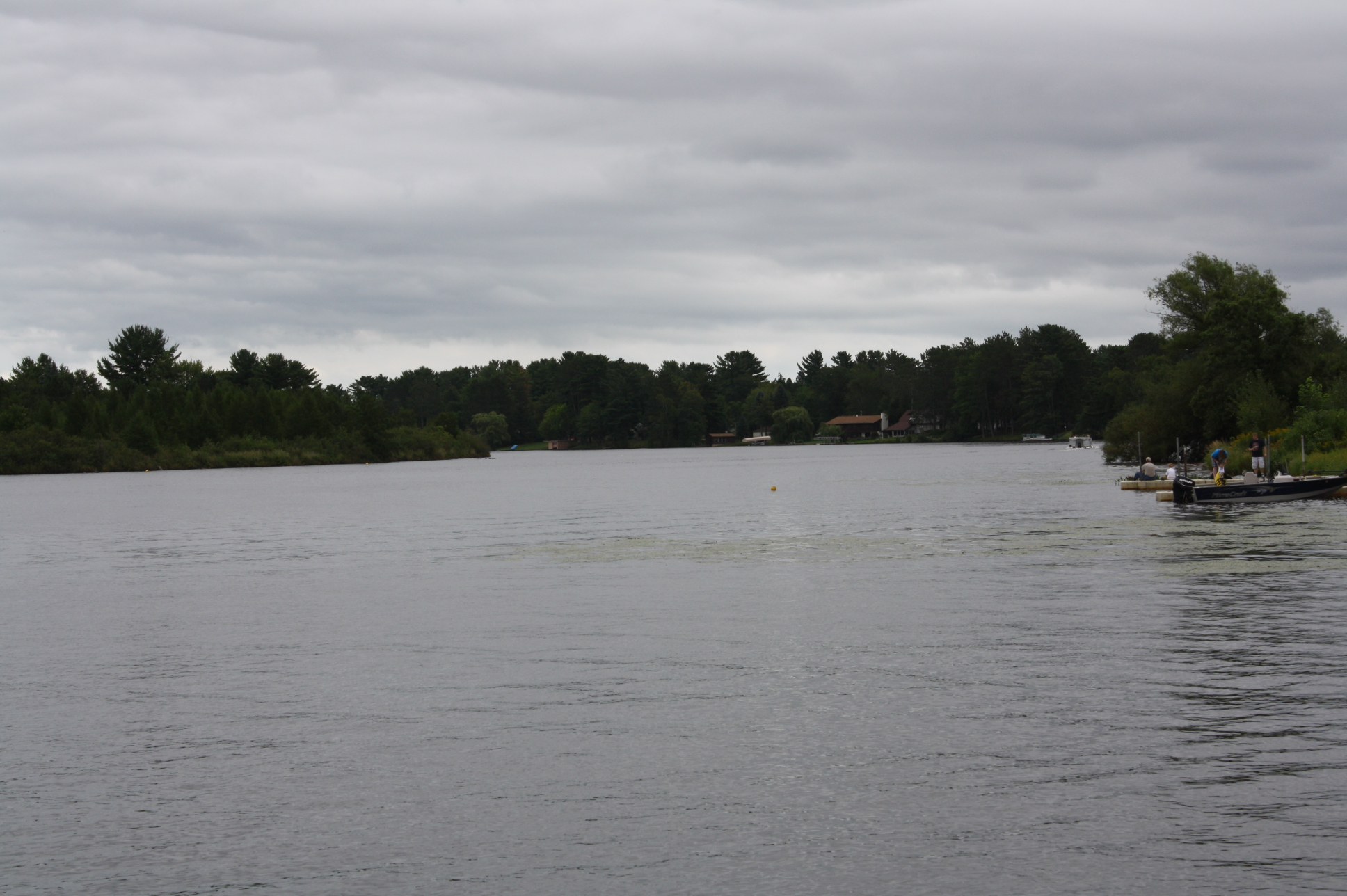
Wisconsin River in Tomahawk

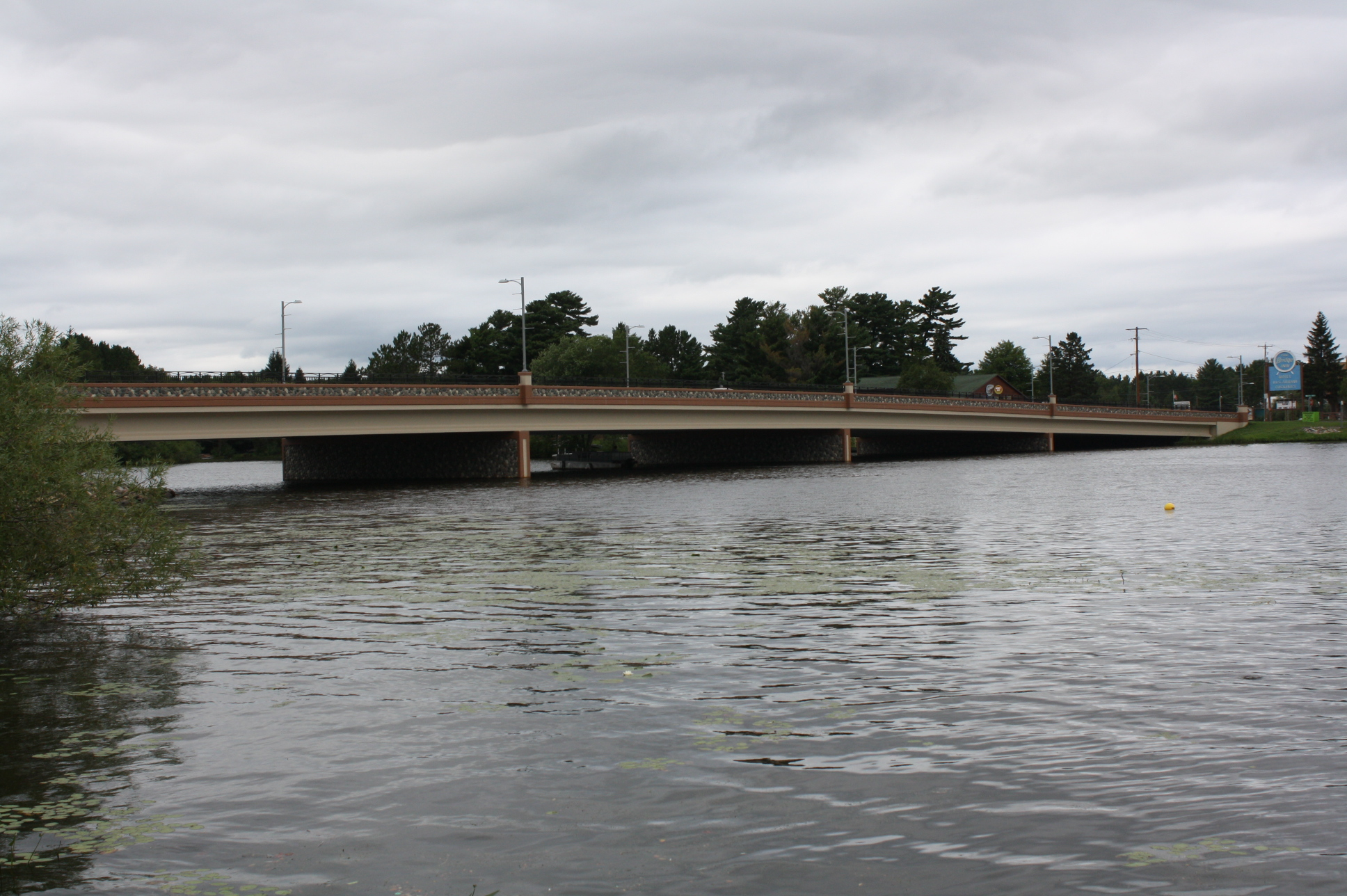
Veteran's Memorial Bridge over the Wisconsin River
