= Tomahawk Regional Airport =

Regional airport in Lincoln County, Wisconsin

- IATA: none; ICAO: KTKV; FAA LID: TKV

Summary
- Airport type: Public
- Owner: City of Tomahawk
- Serves: Tomahawk, Wisconsin
- Opened: November 1972
- Time zone: CST (UTC−06:00)
  - Summer (DST): CDT (UTC−05:00)
- Elevation AMSL: 1,487 ft (453 m)
- Coordinates: 45°28′10″N 089°48′18″W
- Website: TomahawkRegionalAirport.com

Map
- Location of airport in Wisconsin TKV (the United States)

Runways
Direction	Length		Surface
Direction	ft	m	Surface
9/27	4,401	1,341	Asphalt

Statistics
- Aircraft operations (2021): 7,200
- Based aircraft (2024): 15
- Source: Federal Aviation Administration

Tomahawk Regional Airport (ICAO: KTKV, FAA LID: TKV) is a city owned public use airport located three nautical miles (6 km) west of the central business district of Tomahawk, a city in Lincoln County, Wisconsin, United States. It is included in the Federal Aviation Administration (FAA) National Plan of Integrated Airport Systems for 2025–2029, in which it is categorized as a basic general aviation facility.

Although many U.S. airports use the same three-letter location identifier for the FAA and IATA, this facility is assigned TKV by the FAA but has no designation from the IATA (which assigned TKV to Tatakoto Airport in Tatakoto, Tuamotu, French Polynesia).

== Facilities and aircraft ==
Tomahawk Regional Airport covers an area of 280 acres (113 ha) at an elevation of 1,487 feet (453 m) above mean sea level. It has one runway designated 9/27 with an asphalt surface measuring 4,401 by 75 feet (1,341 x 23 m) with approved GPS approaches.

For the 12-month period ending August 12, 2021, the airport had 7,200 aircraft operations, an average of 20 per day: 97% general aviation and 3% air taxi. In August 2024, there were 15 aircraft based at this airport: 12 single-engine, 2 multi-engine and 1 glider.

== See also ==
- List of airports in Wisconsin
