= Merton W. Baker =

United States Air Force general

- Born: July 1, 1924; Tomahawk, Wisconsin
- Died: October 17, 2000 (aged 76); Bernalillo, New Mexico
- Military career
- Allegiance: United States of America
- Branch: United States Air Force
- Rank: Major general

Merton W. Baker (July 19, 1924 – October 17, 2000) was a major general in the United States Air Force.

== Biography ==
Baker was born in Tomahawk, Wisconsin, in 1924. He would graduate from high school in Evansville, Wisconsin, and attend the University of Wisconsin-Whitewater and Creighton University. Baker died on October 17, 2000.

== Career ==
Baker originally joined the United States Army Air Corps in 1943. During World War II he served in Italy. From 1953 to 1957, he was stationed at McConnell Air Force Base. Baker would acquire more than 7,000 flying hours in his career, piloting planes that include the Boeing B-47 Stratojet, Boeing B-52 Stratofortress, Lockheed T-33 Shooting Star, Cessna T-37 Tweet, T-39 Sabreliner, and the Douglas B-66 Destroyer. His retirement was effective as of April 1, 1981.

Awards he received include the Legion of Merit, the Distinguished Flying Cross, the Meritorious Service Medal, the Air Medal with two silver oak leaf clusters and bronze oak leaf cluster, the Joint Service Commendation Medal, and the Air Force Commendation Medal with oak leaf cluster.
