= Ringle, Wisconsin =

- Town
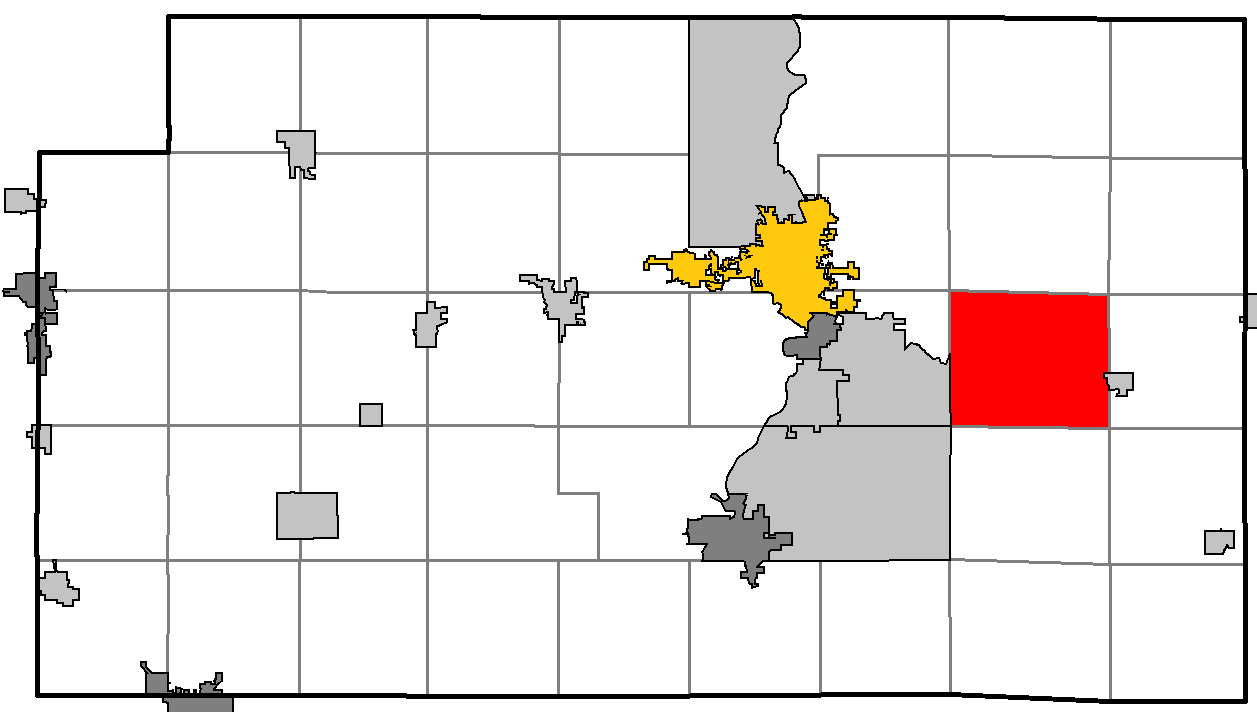
- Location of Ringle shown in Marathon County

- Location of Marathon County, Wisconsin
- Coordinates: 44°53′29″N 89°25′39″W
- Country: United States
- State: Wisconsin
- County: Marathon

Area
  - Total: 42.1 sq mi (109.1 km^{2})
  - Land: 42.1 sq mi (109.0 km^{2})
  - Water: 0.077 sq mi (0.2 km^{2})
- Elevation: 1,300 ft (400 m)

Population (2020)
  - Total: 1,743
  - Density: 41.42/sq mi (15.99/km^{2})
- Time zone: UTC-6 (Central (CST))
  - Summer (DST): UTC-5 (CDT)
- Area codes: 715 & 534
- FIPS code: 55-68075
- GNIS feature ID: 1584037
- Website: https://townofringlewi.com/

Ringle is a town in Marathon County, Wisconsin, United States. The population was 1,743 at the 2020 census. The unincorporated community of Ringle is located in the town. On April 17, 2026, the town was hit by an EF3 tornado, and 75 homes were badly damaged or destroyed. No one was injured or killed in the storm outbreak, however.

== Geography ==
According to the United States Census Bureau, the town has a total area of 42.1 square miles (109.1 km^{2}), of which 42.1 square miles (109.0 km^{2}) is land and 0.1 square miles (0.2 km^{2}), or 0.17%, is water.

== Demographics ==
Ringle is part of the Wausau (WI) Metropolitan Statistical Area.

=== 2000 census ===
At the 2000 census there were 1,408 people, 473 households, and 405 families living in the town. The population density was 33.5 people per square mile (12.9/km^{2}). There were 487 housing units at an average density of 11.6 per square mile (4.5/km^{2}). The racial makeup of the town was 97.59% White, 0.07% African American, 0.85% Native American, 0.07% Asian, and 1.42% from two or more races. Hispanic or Latino of any race were 0.36%.

Of the 473 households 40.8% had children under the age of 18 living with them, 76.7% were married couples living together, 5.9% had a female householder with no husband present, and 14.2% were non-families. 9.7% of households were one person and 3.8% were one person aged 65 or older. The average household size was 2.98 and the average family size was 3.20.

The age distribution was 28.7% under the age of 18, 6.6% from 18 to 24, 29.7% from 25 to 44, 26.6% from 45 to 64, and 8.5% 65 or older. The median age was 38 years. For every 100 females, there were 100.0 males. For every 100 females age 18 and over, there were 103.7 males.

The median household income was $57,891 and the median family income was $60,583. Males had a median income of $37,692 versus $25,489 for females. The per capita income for the town was $20,210. About 4.1% of families and 3.6% of the population were below the poverty line, including 2.0% of those under age 18 and 17.3% of those age 65 or over.

== Economy ==
Ringle is the home of the Polka America Corporation.
