= Francisco Reynolds Baker =

General Francisco Reynolds Baker
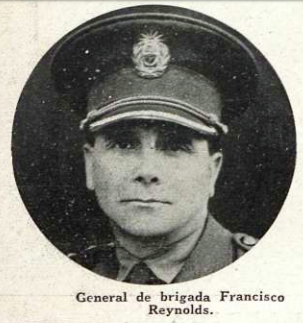

Director of the Colegio Militar de la Nación
- In office 1929–1933

Personal details
- Born: August 13, 1881 Buenos Aires, Argentina
- Died: c. 1967 Buenos Aires, Argentina
- Resting place: Recoleta Cemetery
- Spouse: Matilde Hartenstein.
- Occupation: Military; Politician
- Profession: Army

Military service
- Allegiance: Argentine
- Branch/service: Argentine Army
- Years of service: c. 1903–1945
- Rank: General
- Commands: 1.° División del Ejército Argentino

Francisco Reynolds Baker (1882 – c. 1967) was an Argentine politician and military man, who served as director of the Argentine Military School, and as president of Superior Council of War and Navy.

== Biography ==
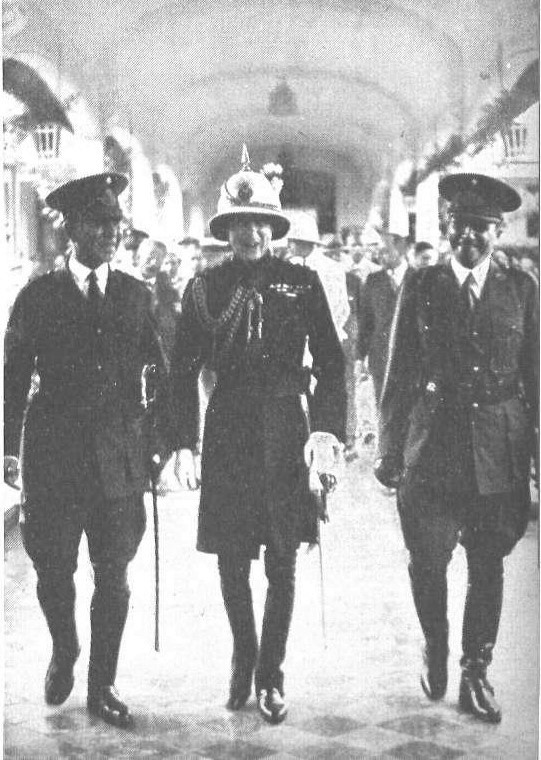
Francisco Baker (right) and the Prince of Wales, in his visit to the Military College

Born in Buenos Aires, Baker is the son of Francisco Reynolds, a soldier belonging to an Anglo-Creole family of Buenos Aires, and Alice Baker Spencer, born in New York City. He was director of the military school from 1929 to 1933, being appointed that same year to occupy the command of Army Arsenals.

Francisco Reynolds took an active part in the military political events of 1930 against the government of Hipólito Yrigoyen. In 1938, he was appointed to the command of 1st Argentine Army Division. He also served as head of the Supreme War Council during the presidency of Juan Domingo Perón.
