= Francisco Reynolds =

General Francisco Reynolds y Lastra
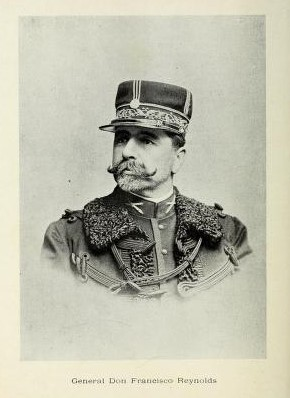

Director of the Colegio Militar de la Nación
- In office 1900–?
- President: Julio Argentino Roca

Personal details
- Born: November 11, 1852 Buenos Aires, Argentina
- Died: May 10, 1923 (aged 70) Buenos Aires, Argentina
- Resting place: La Recoleta cemetery
- Occupation: Army politician
- Profession: Army's officer
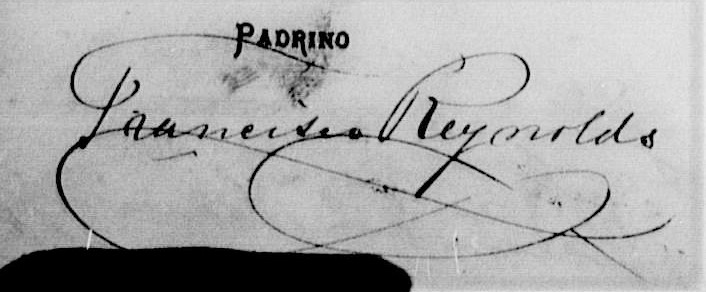
- Signature

Military service
- Allegiance: Argentine Republic
- Branch/service: Argentine Army
- Years of service: 1872–1910
- Rank: General
- Battles/wars: Revolution of 1880; Revolution of the Park

Francisco Reynolds (November 11, 1852 – May 10, 1923) was an Argentine military man who served as Inspector General of artillery, General staff Assistant and Director of the National Military College of Argentina.

== Biography ==
Reynolds was born in Buenos Aires, the son of Francis William Reynolds, born in London, and Manuela Lastra Casal, a lady belonging to a Creole family of Spanish roots. He was married to Alice Baker Spencer, born in New York City.

In 1888, Francisco Reynolds obtained the rank of Colonel, being appointed as head of the 2nd Artillery regiment. In 1892, he was promoted to General of Brigade, and appointed as Inspector General of Artillery. A year later in 1893, he was appointed to the Army General Staff, as a general assistant. He was promoted to General of Division in 1900, serving as Head of the Artillery Division of Mercedes, province of Buenos Aires.

Francisco Reynolds also served in Europe, as an inspector in charge of the supervision of the Argentine officers. Between 1910 and 1915 he served as Consul of the Argentine Republic in Paris, France.

In 1890 he was commissioned to carry out an inspection in the territory of Río Negro (Patagonia). He also took part in the organization of Tiro Federal Argentino, being elected as the first president of that institution in 1895.

His grandmother, Rufina Casal Martínez, belonged to old families of Buenos Aires, whose ancestors had served the Spanish Tercios at the service of Philip V of Spain. His son, Francisco Reynolds Baker, was a General who was involved in the political events of 1930. In 1925, he was in charge of the assistance of the Prince of Wales (Edward VIII), who visited the Military College of the Nation, on one of his tours of Argentina.
