= Wausau Downtown Airport =

Airport in Wisconsin, United States

- IATA: AUW; ICAO: KAUW; FAA LID: AUW

Summary
- Airport type: Public
- Owner: City of Wausau
- Serves: Wausau, Wisconsin
- Opened: November 1937
- Time zone: CST (UTC−06:00)
  - Summer (DST): CDT (UTC−05:00)
- Elevation AMSL: 1,201 ft (366 m)
- Coordinates: 44°55′35″N 089°37′37″W
- Public transit access: Metro Ride

Maps
- GPS approach chart for Runway 31

- Location of airport in Wisconsin AUW (the United States)

Runways
Direction	Length		Surface
Direction	ft	m	Surface
13/31	5,200	1,585	Asphalt
5/23	3,041	927	Asphalt
12W/30W	8,000	2,438	Water

Statistics
- Aircraft operations (2024): 36,400
- Based aircraft (2024): 75
- Source: Federal Aviation Administration

Wausau Downtown Airport (IATA: AUW, ICAO: KAUW, FAA LID: AUW) is a city-owned public-use airport located in Wausau, a city in Marathon County, Wisconsin, United States. The airport serves general aviation aircraft, charter flights and seaplane operations. It is included in the Federal Aviation Administration (FAA) National Plan of Integrated Airport Systems for 2025–2029, in which it is categorized as a regional general aviation facility.

== History ==
The Wausau airport was founded in 1927 and carried commercial flights until 1969 when the Central Wisconsin Airport began operations.

== Facilities and aircraft ==
Wausau Downtown Airport covers an area of 294 acres (119 ha) at an elevation of 1,201 feet (366 m) above mean sea level. The airport contains two asphalt paved runways: the primary runway 13/31 measuring 5,200 x 100 ft. (1,585 x 30 m) with approved GPS approaches and the crosswind runway 5/23 measuring 3,041 x 100 ft. (927 x 30 m). It also has a seaplane landing area designated 12W/30W which measures 8,000 x 300 ft. (2,438 x 91 m). The Wausau NDB navaid, (FZK) frequency 243 kHz, is located on the field.

For the 12-month period ending June 6, 2024, the airport had 36,400 aircraft operations, an average of 100 per day: 93% general aviation, 7% air taxi and less than 1% military. In August 2024, there were 75 aircraft based at this airport: 71 single-engine and 4 jet. Both based and transient general aviation aircraft are supported by the fixed-base operator (FBO) Wausau Flying Service.

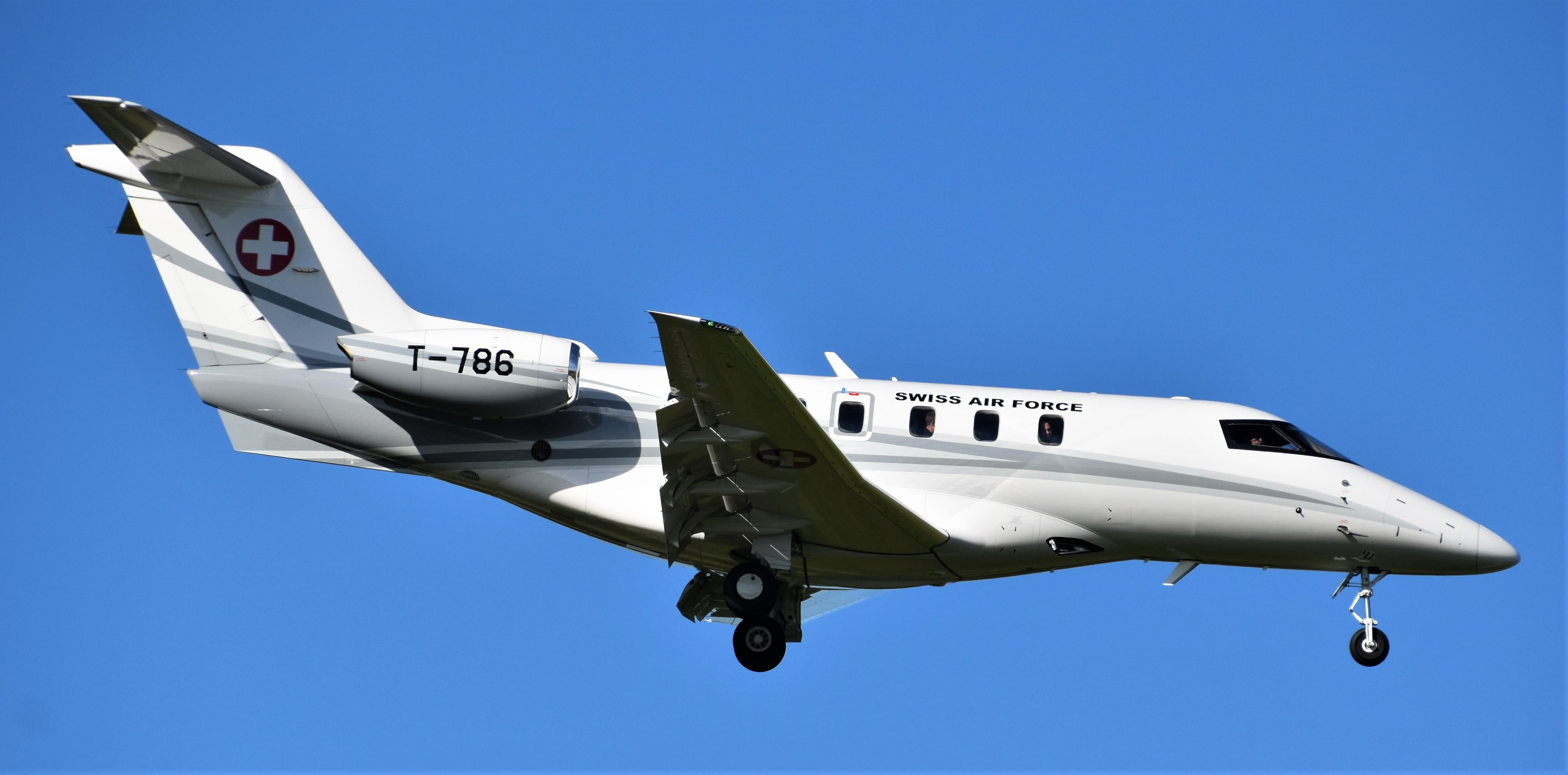
A Pilatus PC-24

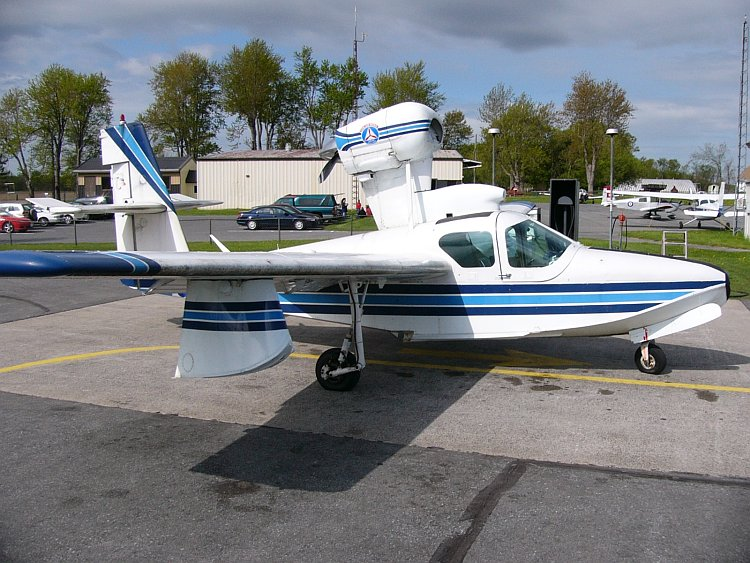
Lake LA-4-200 Buccaneer

== Cargo airlines ==
Airlines	Destination
FedEx Feeder operated by CSA Air	Rochester (MN)
Freight Runners Express	Milwaukee

== Ground transportation ==
Public transit service to the airport is provided by Metro Ride with buses stopping on Lake View Drive.

== Accidents and incidents ==
- On September 12, 2026, a Beechcraft K35 Bonanza with two occupants, including U.S. Representative Tom Tiffany, made a water ditching into Lake Wausau while on approach to the airport after the aircraft lost power. Tiffany and the pilot swam to safety and sustained minor injuries.

== See also ==
- List of airports in Wisconsin
