= Weston (town), Marathon County, Wisconsin =

Town in Wisconsin, U.S.

Weston, Wisconsin
- Town
- Town of Weston
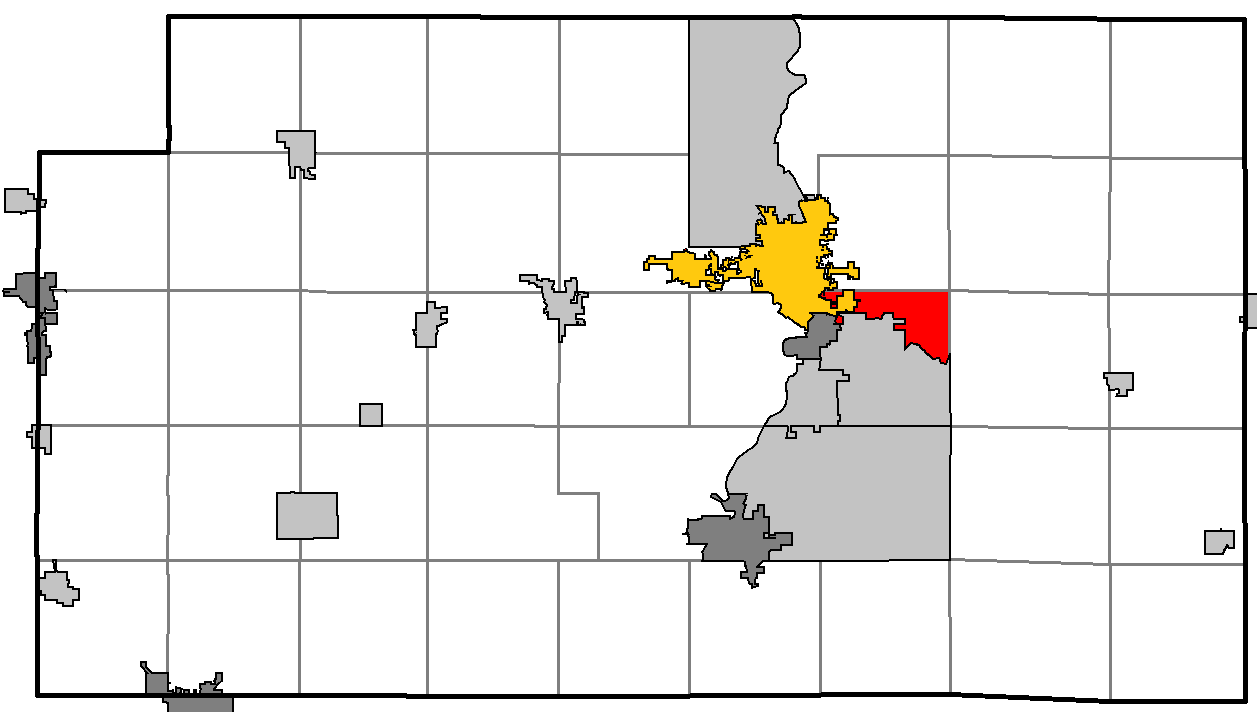
- Location of Weston, Marathon County

- Location of Marathon County, Wisconsin
- Coordinates: 44°55′45″N 89°31′46″W
- Country: United States
- State: Wisconsin
- County: Marathon

Area
  - Total: 8.63 sq mi (22.4 km^{2})
  - Land: 8.61 sq mi (22.3 km^{2})
  - Water: 0.02 sq mi (0.052 km^{2})

Population (2020)
  - Total: 657
  - Density: 76.3/sq mi (29.5/km^{2})
- Time zone: UTC-6 (Central (CST))
  - Summer (DST): UTC-5 (CDT)
- Area code(s): 715 and 534
- GNIS feature ID: 1584413

The Town of Weston is located in Marathon County, Wisconsin, United States. It is part of the Wausau, Wisconsin Metropolitan Statistical Area. The population was 657 at the 2020 census.

== History ==
Until 1905, the Town of Weston included the territory now known as the Town of Rib Mountain, which was split off under the name of Erickson. The southern two-thirds of the Town of Weston was split away in 1996 to form the village of Weston.

== Geography ==
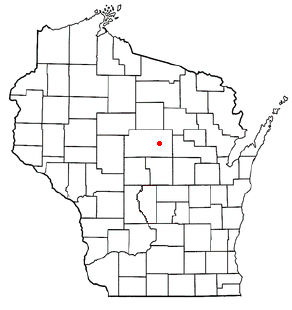
Location of the Town of Weston, Wisconsin

According to the United States Census Bureau, the town has a total area of 8.9 square miles (23.1 km^{2}), of which 8.8 square miles (22.9 km^{2}) is land and 0.077 square miles (0.2 km^{2}), or 0.67%, is water.

== Demographics ==
At the 2000 census there were 514 people, 179 households, and 151 families living in the town. The population density was 56.7 people per square mile (21.9/km^{2}). There were 180 housing units at an average density of 19.9 per square mile (7.7/km^{2}). The racial makeup of the town was 99.03% White, 0.58% Black or African American and 0.39% Native American. 0.19% of the population were Hispanic or Latino of any race. Of the 179 households 36.3% had children under the age of 18 living with them, 77.7% were married couples living together, 5.0% had a female householder with no husband present, and 15.1% were non-families. 10.6% of households were one person and 5.0% were one person aged 65 or older. The average household size was 2.87 and the average family size was 3.12.

The age distribution was 26.8% under the age of 18, 6.4% from 18 to 24, 32.5% from 25 to 44, 22.6% from 45 to 64, and 11.7% 65 or older. The median age was 38 years. For every 100 females, there were 103.2 males. For every 100 females age 18 and over, there were 91.8 males.

The median household income was $56,719 and the median family income was $61,375. Males had a median income of $36,750 versus $24,583 for females. The per capita income for the town was $23,941. About 5.4% of families and 3.2% of the population were below the poverty line, including 4.2% of those under age 18 and none of those age 65 or over.
