= Weston, Wisconsin =

- Village
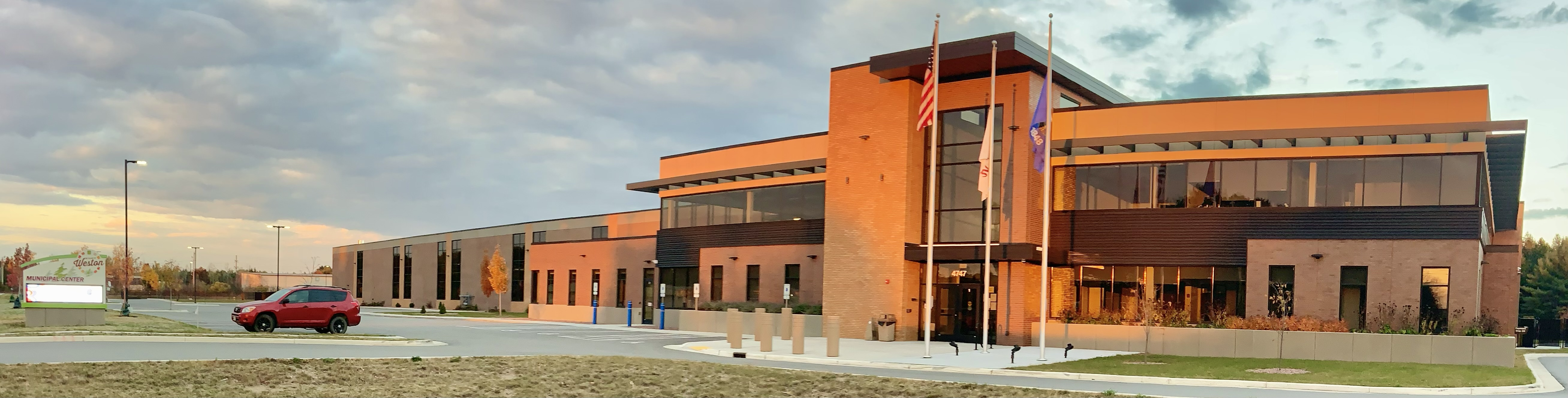
- Weston Municipal Center

- Location of Weston in Marathon County, Wisconsin.
- Coordinates: 44°54′14″N 89°34′3″W
- Country: United States
- State: Wisconsin
- County: Marathon

Area
  - Total: 21.64 sq mi (56.05 km^{2})
  - Land: 21.62 sq mi (55.99 km^{2})
  - Water: 0.023 sq mi (0.06 km^{2})
- Elevation: 1,250 ft (381 m)

Population (2020)
  - Total: 15,723
  - Density: 727.3/sq mi (280.8/km^{2})
- Time zone: UTC-6 (Central (CST))
  - Summer (DST): UTC-5 (CDT)
- Area codes: 715 & 534
- FIPS code: 55-86025
- GNIS feature ID: 1761601
- Website: www.westonwisconsin.org

Weston is a village in Marathon County, Wisconsin, United States. It is part of the Wausau Metropolitan Statistical Area. The population was 15,723 at the time of the 2020 census.

== History ==
Initially part of the Town of Weston, the village was founded on March 11, 1996, as a way to secure its borders from neighboring communities. Two-thirds of the original town were split off to form the new village of the same name.

== Geography ==
According to the United States Census Bureau, the village has a total area of 21.58 square miles (55.89 km^{2}), of which 21.55 square miles (55.81 km^{2}) is land and 0.03 square miles (0.08 km^{2}) is water.

== Demographics ==
Historical population
Census	Pop.	Note	%±
1970	3,375		—
1980	8,775		160.0%
1990	9,714		10.7%
2000	12,079		24.3%
2010	14,868		23.1%
2020	15,723		5.8%
U.S. Decennial Census

=== 2020 census ===
As of the 2020 census, Weston had a population of 15,723. The median age was 39.1 years. 23.3% of residents were under the age of 18 and 17.7% of residents were 65 years of age or older. For every 100 females there were 96.7 males, and for every 100 females age 18 and over there were 93.6 males age 18 and over.

94.7% of residents lived in urban areas, while 5.3% lived in rural areas.

There were 6,399 households in Weston, of which 28.9% had children under the age of 18 living in them. Of all households, 46.8% were married-couple households, 18.7% were households with a male householder and no spouse or partner present, and 25.5% were households with a female householder and no spouse or partner present. About 30.5% of all households were made up of individuals and 11.9% had someone living alone who was 65 years of age or older.

There were 6,670 housing units, of which 4.1% were vacant. The homeowner vacancy rate was 0.9% and the rental vacancy rate was 5.3%.

Racial composition as of the 2020 census
Race	Number	Percent
White	12,820	81.5%
Black or African American	176	1.1%
American Indian and Alaska Native	97	0.6%
Asian	1,733	11.0%
Native Hawaiian and Other Pacific Islander	6	0.0%
Some other race	196	1.2%
Two or more races	695	4.4%
Hispanic or Latino (of any race)	511	3.3%

=== 2010 census ===
As of the census of 2010, there were 14,868 people, 5,772 households, and 3,928 families living in the village. The population density was 689.9 inhabitants per square mile (266.4/km^{2}). There were 6,364 housing units at an average density of 295.3 per square mile (114.0/km^{2}). The racial makeup of the village was 87.7% White, 0.8% African American, 0.4% Native American, 8.7% Asian, 0.8% from other races, and 1.6% from two or more races. Hispanic or Latino of any race were 2.0% of the population.

There were 5,772 households, of which 36.5% had children under the age of 18 living with them, 51.2% were married couples living together, 11.3% had a female householder with no husband present, 5.5% had a male householder with no wife present, and 31.9% were non-families. 25.1% of all households were made up of individuals, and 7.9% had someone living alone who was 65 years of age or older. The average household size was 2.54 and the average family size was 3.06.

The median age in the village was 35.6 years. 27.4% of residents were under the age of 18; 7.8% were between the ages of 18 and 24; 28.4% were from 25 to 44; 24.8% were from 45 to 64; and 11.5% were 65 years of age or older. The gender makeup of the village was 49.5% male and 50.5% female.

=== 2000 census ===
As of the census of 2000, there were 12,079 people, 4,572 households, and 3,214 families living in the village. The population density was 567.2 people per square mile (219.0/km^{2}). There were 4,806 housing units at an average density of 87.1 persons/km^{2} (225.7 persons/sq mi). The racial makeup of the village was 93.11% White, 0.30% African American, 0.40% Native American, 4.88% Asian, 0.02% Pacific Islander, 0.32% from other races, and 0.97% from two or more races. 0.70% of the population were Hispanic or Latino of any race.

There were 4,572 households, out of which 38.0% had children under the age of 18 living with them, 56.5% were married couples living together, 9.8% have a woman whose husband does not live with her, and 29.7% were non-families. 22.2% of all households were made up of individuals, and 5.7% had someone living alone who was 65 years of age or older. The average household size was 2.61 and the average family size was 3.10.

In the village, the population was spread out, with 28.4% under the age of 18, 9.4% from 18 to 24, 33.3% from 25 to 44, 19.7% from 45 to 64, and 9.1% who were 65 years of age or older. The median age was 32 years. For every 100 females, there were 98.3 males. For every 100 females age 18 and over, there were 96.4 males.

The median income for a household in the village was $46,063, and the median income for a family was $52,398. Males had a median income of $36,586 versus $25,047 for females. The per capita income for the village was $20,148. 5.1% of the population and 4.2% of families were below the poverty line. Out of the total people living in poverty, 6.4% are under the age of 18 and 5.9% are 65 or older.

== Transportation ==
=== Airport ===
The Central Wisconsin Airport (KCWA) serves Weston, the county and surrounding communities with both scheduled commercial jet service and general aviation services.

The Wausau Downtown Airport (KAUW) serves Weston with non-commercial traffic such as general aviation, charter flights and seaplane operations.

== Education ==
The village is served by the D.C. Everest School District which has schools located across the south metro area. Public schools located in Weston are Mountain Bay Elementary, Weston Elementary, Odyssey Elementary, DC Everest Idea School, D.C. Everest Middle School, D.C. Everest Junior High School, and D.C. Everest Senior High School.

== Public Safety ==
=== Police ===
The village was served by the Everest Metropolitan Police Department from the inception of the Village of Weston until 2024. In 2024, the Everest Metropolitan Police Department was dissolved with the creation of a new police department. In 2024, the Mountain Bay Metropolitan Police Department was formed, which serves the village of Weston and the village of Rothschild. They additionally contract with the city of Schofield and town of Weston.

=== Fire/EMS ===
The village was served by the Weston Fire Department from the inception of the Village of Weston until 2014. In January 2014, the South Area Fire and Emergency Response (SAFER) District was created. SAFER is owned by the Village of Weston and the Village of Rib Mountain with contracted service to multiple other area municipalities and townships.

== See also ==
- Kara Neumann case
