= List of rivers of Wisconsin =

This is a list of rivers in the U.S. state of Wisconsin.

== By drainage basin ==
This list is arranged by drainage basin, with respective tributaries indented under each larger stream's name.

=== Great Lakes Drainage ===
==== Lake Michigan ====
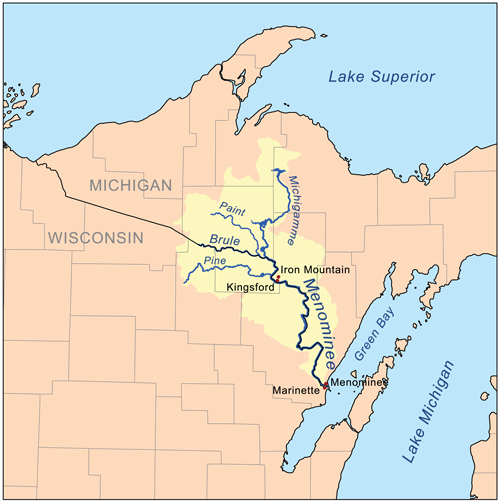
Menominee Drainage Basin

- Menominee River
  - Wausaukee River
  - Pike River
  - Pemebonwon River
  - Little Popple River
  - Pine River
    - Popple River
  - Brule River
- Peshtigo River
  - Little Peshtigo River
  - Thunder River
  - Rat River
    - Indian River
- Oconto River
  - Little River
- Pensaukee River
- Little Suamico River
- Suamico River
  - Potter Creek

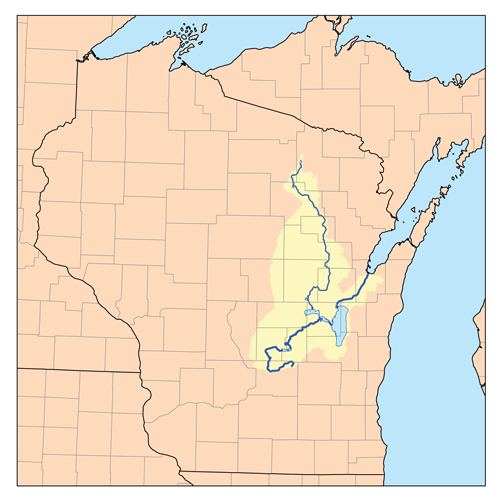
Fox Drainage Basin

- Fox River
  - East River
  - Fond du Lac River
  - Wolf River
    - Pine River
    - Rat River
    - Waupaca River
      - Crystal River
      - Tomorrow River
    - Little Wolf River
    - Embarrass River
      - Pigeon River
    - Shioc River
    - Red River
    - Evergreen River
    - Lily River
    - Hunting River
  - White River
  - Mecan River
  - Grand River
  - Montello River
- Red River
- Mink River
- Ahnapee River
- Kewaunee River
- East Twin River
- West Twin River
  - Devils River
  - Neshota River
- Little Manitowoc River

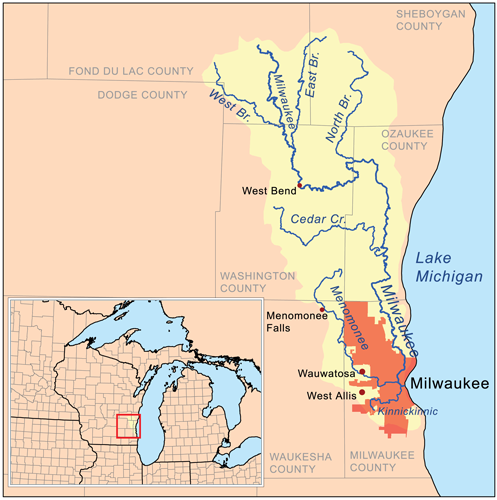
Milwaukee Drainage Basin

- Manitowoc River
  - Branch River
  - Killsnake River
- Pigeon River
  - Meeme River
- Sheboygan River
  - Onion River
  - Mullet River
- Black River
- Milwaukee River
  - Kinnickinnic River
  - Menomonee River
    - Little Menomonee River
  - Ulao Creek
  - Cedar Creek
- Root River
- Pike River
- Barnes Creek

==== Lake Superior ====
- Presque Isle River
- Black River
- Montreal River
  - West Branch Montreal River
- Bad River
  - White River
  - Potato River
  - Marengo River
    - Brunsweiler River
  - Tyler Forks
  - Iron River
- Kakagon River
- Fish Creek
- Boyd Creek
- Whittlesey Creek
- Bono Creek
- Sioux River
  - Little Sioux River
- Onion River
- Raspberry River
- Sand River
- Siskiwit River
- Bark River
- Cranberry River
- Flag River
- Iron River
- Bois Brule River
  - Little Bois Brule River
- Poplar River
- Middle River
- Amnicon River
  - Little Amnicon River
- Nemadji River
  - Black River
- St. Louis River
  - Pokegama River
  - Little Pokegama River
  - Red River

=== Mississippi River Drainage ===
- Mississippi River
  - Illinois River (IL)
    - Fox River
      - White River
      - Mukwonago River
    - Des Plaines River
      - Root River
  - Rock River
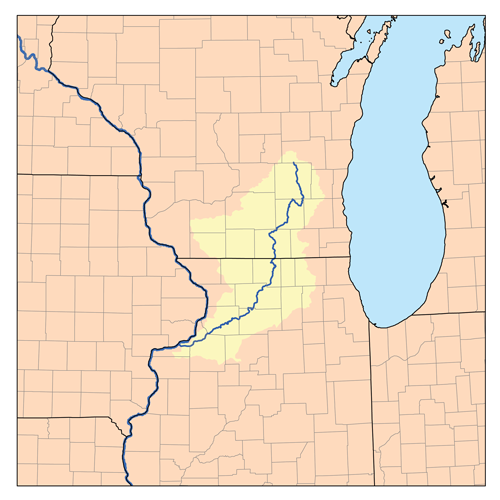
    Rock Drainage Basin
    - Kishwaukee River (IL)
      - Piscasaw Creek
    - Pecatonica River
      - Sugar River
        - Little Sugar River
        - West Branch Sugar River
      - East Branch Pecatonica River
        - Yellowstone River
    - Yahara River
    - Bark River
      - Scuppernong River
    - Crawfish River
      - Beaver Dam River
        - Calamus Creek
      - Maunesha River
    - Johnson Creek
    - Oconomowoc River
      - Coney River
    - Ashippun River
    - Rubicon River
    - East Branch Rock River
      - Kohlsville River
  - Apple River
  - Galena River
  - Sinsinawa River
  - Little Menominee River
  - Menominee River
  - Platte River
    - Little Platte River
  - Grant River
    - Little Grant River
  - Wisconsin River
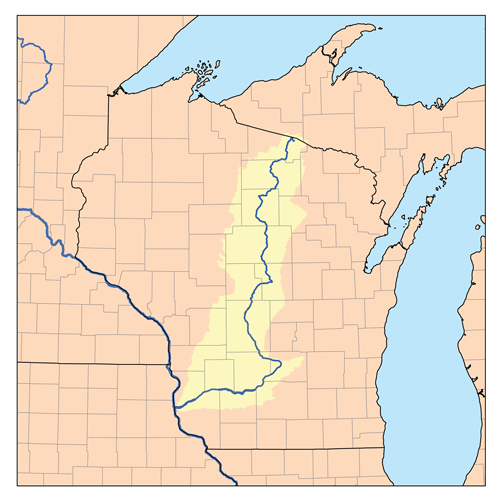
    Wisconsin Drainage Basin
    - Kickapoo River
      - Weister Creek
    - Big Green River
      - Little Green River
    - Blue River
    - Pine River
    - Otter Creek
      - Flint Creek
        - Harker Creek
    - Baraboo River
      - Narrows Creek
    - Dell Creek
    - Lemonweir River
      - Little Lemonweir River
    - Yellow River
      - Little Yellow River
    - Plover River
    - Little Eau Claire River
    - Little Eau Pleine River
    - Big Eau Pleine River
    - Eau Claire River
    - Big Rib River
      - Little Rib River
    - Trappe River
      - Little Trappe River
    - Pine River
    - Prairie River
    - Copper River
    - New Wood River
    - Spirit River
    - Somo River
      - Little Somo River
    - Tomahawk River
      - Little Rice River
      - Willow River
      - Squirrel River
    - Pelican River
    - Eagle River
      - Deerskin River
  - Leitner Creek
  - Bad Axe River
  - La Crosse River
    - Little La Crosse River
  - Black River
    - Popple River
    - Little Black River
  - Trempealeau River
  - Buffalo River
  - Chippewa River
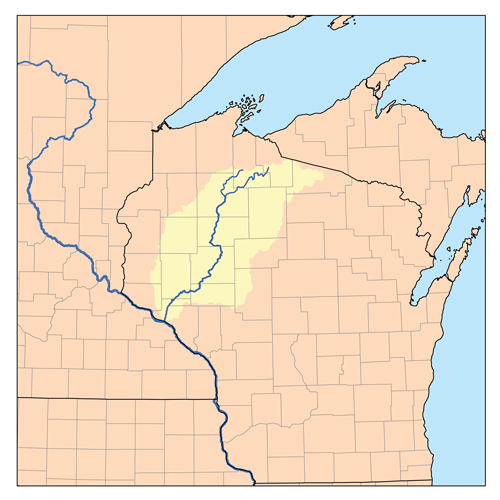
    Chippewa Drainage Basin
    - Eau Galle River
    - Red Cedar River
      - Hay River
      - Chetek River
      - Yellow River
        - Vermillion River
          - Sweeny Pond
      - Brill River
    - Eau Claire River
      - Wolf River
    - Yellow River
    - Jump River
      - Little Jump River
      - Mondeaux River
    - Flambeau River
      - North Fork Flambeau River
        - Swamp Creek
      - South Fork Flambeau River
        - Elk River
          - Little Elk River
      - Turtle River
        - Little Turtle River
      - Bear River
      - Manitowish River
        - Trout River
    - Thornapple River
      - Little Thornapple River
    - Brunet River
    - Couderay River
    - North Fork Chief River
    - Teal River
    - Token Creek
    - Moose River
  - Rush River
  - Trimbelle River
  - Wind River
  - Big River
  - St. Croix River
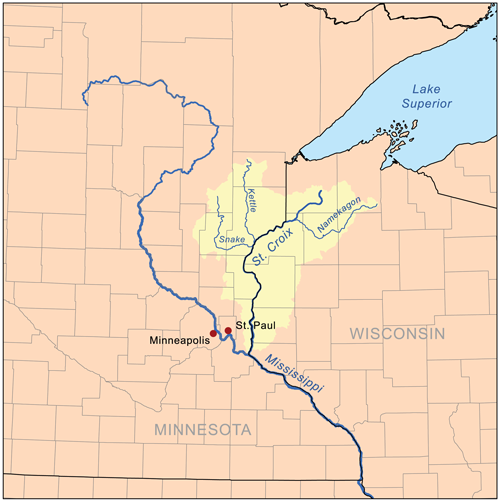
    St. Croix Drainage Basin
    - Kinnickinnic River
    - Willow River
    - Apple River
      - Straight River
    - Trade River
    - Wood River
    - Clam River
    - Yellow River
    - Upper Tamarack River
      - Spruce River
    - Namekagon River
      - Totagatic River
        - Ounce River
    - Moose River
    - Eau Claire River

== Alphabetically ==
- Ahnapee River
- Amnicon River
- Apple River (Illinois), tributary of Mississippi River
- Apple River (Wisconsin), tributary of St. Croix River
- Ashippun River
- Bad Axe River
- Bad River
- Baraboo River
- Bark River (Lake Superior)
- Bark River (Rock River tributary)
- Barnes Creek
- Bear River
- Beaver Dam River
- Big Eau Pleine River
- Big Green River
- Big Rib River
- Big River
- Black River (Gogebic County), tributary of Lake Superior via upper Michigan
- Black River (Mississippi River tributary)
- Black River (Nemadji River tributary)
- Black River (Wisconsin–Lake Michigan), tributary of Lake Michigan
- Blue River
- Bois Brule River
- Bono Creek
- Boyd Creek
- Branch River
- Brill River
- Brule River
- Brunet River
- Brunsweiler River
- Buffalo River
- Calamus Creek
- Cedar Creek
- Chetek River
- Chief River
- Chippewa River
- Clam River
- Coney River
- Copper River
- Couderay River
- Cranberry River
- Crawfish River
- Crystal River
- Deerskin River
- Dell Creek
- Des Plaines River
- Devils River
- Eagle River
- East Branch Pecatonica River
- East River
- East Twin River
- Eau Claire River (Chippewa River tributary)
- Eau Claire River (St. Croix River tributary)
- Eau Claire River (Wisconsin River tributary)
- Eau Galle River
- Elk River
- Embarrass River
- Evergreen River
- Fisher River
- Flag River
- Flambeau River
- Flint Creek
- Fond du Lac River
- Fox River (Illinois River tributary)
- Fox River (Wisconsin), tributary of Green Bay
- Galena River
- Grand River
- Grant River
- Harker Creek
- Hay River
- Indian River
- Iron River (Bad River tributary)
- Iron River (Lake Superior)
- Johnson Creek
- Jump River
- Kakagon River
- Kewaunee River
- Kickapoo River
- Killsnake River
- Kinnickinnic River (Milwaukee River tributary)
- Kinnickinnic River (St. Croix River tributary)
- Kinnickinnic River (South fork)
- Kohlsville River
- La Crosse River
- Leitner Creek
- Lemonweir River
- Lily River
- Little Amnicon River
- Little Black River
- Little Boise Brule River
- Little Deerskin River
- Little Eau Claire River
- Little Eau Pleine River
- Little Elk River
- Little Grant River
- Little Green River
- Little Jump River
- Little Lemonweir River
- Little Manitowoc River
- Little Menominee River
- Little Menomonee River
- Little Moose River
- Little Oconomowoc River
- Little Peshtigo River
- Little Platte River
- Little Plover River
- Little Pokegama River
- Little Popple River
- Little Rib River
- Little Rice River
- Little River (Oconto River tributary)
- Little Sioux River
- Little Somo River
- Little Suamico River
- Little Sugar River
- Little Thornapple River
- Little Trappe River
- Little Turtle River
- Little Wolf River
- Little Yellow River
- Manitowish River
- Manitowoc River
- Marengo River
- Maunesha River
- Mecan River
- Meeme River
- Menominee River, tributary of Lake Michigan
- Menominee River (Illinois), tributary of Mississippi River
- Menomonee River, tributary of Milwaukee River
- Middle River
- Milwaukee River
- Mink River
- Mississippi River
- Mondeaux River
- Montello River
- Montreal River
- Moose River (Chippewa River tributary)
- Moose River (St. Croix River tributary)
- Mukwonago River
- Mullet River
- Namekagon River
- Nemadji River
- Neshota River
- New Wood River
- North Fork Chief River
- Oconomowoc River
- Oconto River
- Onion River (Lake Superior)
- Onion River (Sheboygan River tributary)
- Otter Creek
- Ounce River
- Pecatonica River
- Pelican River (Wisconsin River tributary)
- Pemebonwon River
- Pensaukee River
- Peshtigo River
- Pewaukee River
- Pigeon River (Embarrass River tributary)
- Pigeon River (Wisconsin-Lake Michigan), tributary of Lake Michigan
- Pike River (Lake Michigan)
- Pike River (Menominee River tributary)
- Pine River (Florence County), tributary of Menominee River
- Pine River (Lincoln County), tributary of Wisconsin River
- Pine River (Richland County), tributary of Wisconsin River
- Pine River (Waushara County), tributary of Wolf River
- Piscasaw Creek
- Platte River
- Plover River
- Pokegama River
- Poplar River
- Popple River (Black River tributary)
- Popple River (Pine River tributary)
- Potato River
- Potter Creek
- Prairie River
- Presque Isle River
- Raspberry River
- Rat River (Peshtigo River tributary)
- Rat River (Wolf River tributary)
- Red Cedar River
- Red River (Lake Michigan)
- Red River (St. Louis River tributary)
- Red River (Wolf River tributary)
- Rock River
- Root River (Des Plaines River tributary)
- Root River
- Rubicon River
- Rush River
- St. Croix River
- St. Germain River
- St. Louis River
- Sand River
- Scuppernong River
- Sheboygan River
- Shioc River
- Sinsinawa River
- Sioux River
- Siskiwit River
- Somo River
- Spirit River
- Spruce River
- Squirrel River
- Straight River
- Suamico River
- Sugar River
- Sweeny Pond River
- Teal River
- Thornapple River
- Thunder River (Peshtigo River tributary)
- Tomahawk River
- Tomorrow River
- Torch River
- Totagatic River
- Trade River
- Trappe River
- Trempealeau River
- Trimbelle River
- Trout River
- Turtle River
- Ulao Creek
- Upper Tamarack River
- Vermillion River
- Waupaca River
- Wausaukee River
- Weister Creek
- West Branch Montreal River
- West Branch Sugar River
- West Twin River
- White River (Bad River tributary)
- White River (Fox River tributary)
- Whittlesey Creek
- Willow River (St. Croix River tributary)
- Willow River (Tomahawk River tributary)
- Wind River
- Wisconsin River
- Wolf River (Eau Claire River tributary)
- Wolf River (Fox River tributary), tributary of Winnebago Pool
- Wood River
- Yahara River
- Yellow River (Chippewa River tributary)
- Yellow River (Red Cedar River tributary)
- Yellow River (St. Croix River tributary)
- Yellow River (Wisconsin River tributary)
- Yellowstone River

== See also ==
- List of rivers in the United States
- List of dams and reservoirs in Wisconsin
