= Little Peshtigo River =

River in northeast Wisconsin

- Location within Wisconsin Location within the United States

Location
- Country: United States
- State: Wisconsin

Physical characteristics
- Source: Montana Lake
  - coordinates: 45.0516522°N 88.1112132°W
- Mouth: Peshtigo River
  - location: Town of Grover
  - coordinates: 45.1241484°N 87.8928834°W
  - elevation: 627 ft (191 m)
- Length: 18.0 miles (29.0 km)

The Little Peshtigo River is an 18.0-mile-long (29.0 km) river in the U.S. state of Wisconsin. It is a tributary of the Peshtigo River.

The Little Peshtigo River begins at Montana Lake and flows through Coleman, Wisconsin, before converging with the Peshtigo River.

== See also ==
List of rivers of Wisconsin
