= Wind River =

Wind River may refer to:

== Places ==
=== Canada ===
- Wind River (Yukon)

=== United States ===
- Wind River (Yukon–Koyukuk Census Area, Alaska), a designated National Wild and Scenic River
- Wind River (Colorado)
- Wind River (Oregon)
- Wind River (Washington)
- Wind River (Wisconsin)
- Wind River (Wyoming)
  - Wind River Basin, a semi-arid intermontane foreland basin in central Wyoming
  - Wind River Canyon, a canyon made from tectonic plate shifting in Wyoming
  - Wind River Formation, a geologic formation in Wyoming
  - Wind River Indian Reservation in Wyoming
  - Wind River Range of Wyoming
    - Wind River Peak

== Films ==
- Wind River (film), a 2017 film by Taylor Sheridan
- Wind River, a 2000 film about Elijah Nicholas Wilson

== Other uses ==
- Wind River Experimental Forest in Washington
- Wind River Systems, an embedded systems software company
