= Scuppernong River =

Scuppernong River may refer to:

- Scuppernong River (North Carolina)
- Scuppernong River (Wisconsin)
