= Corning, Wisconsin =

- Town
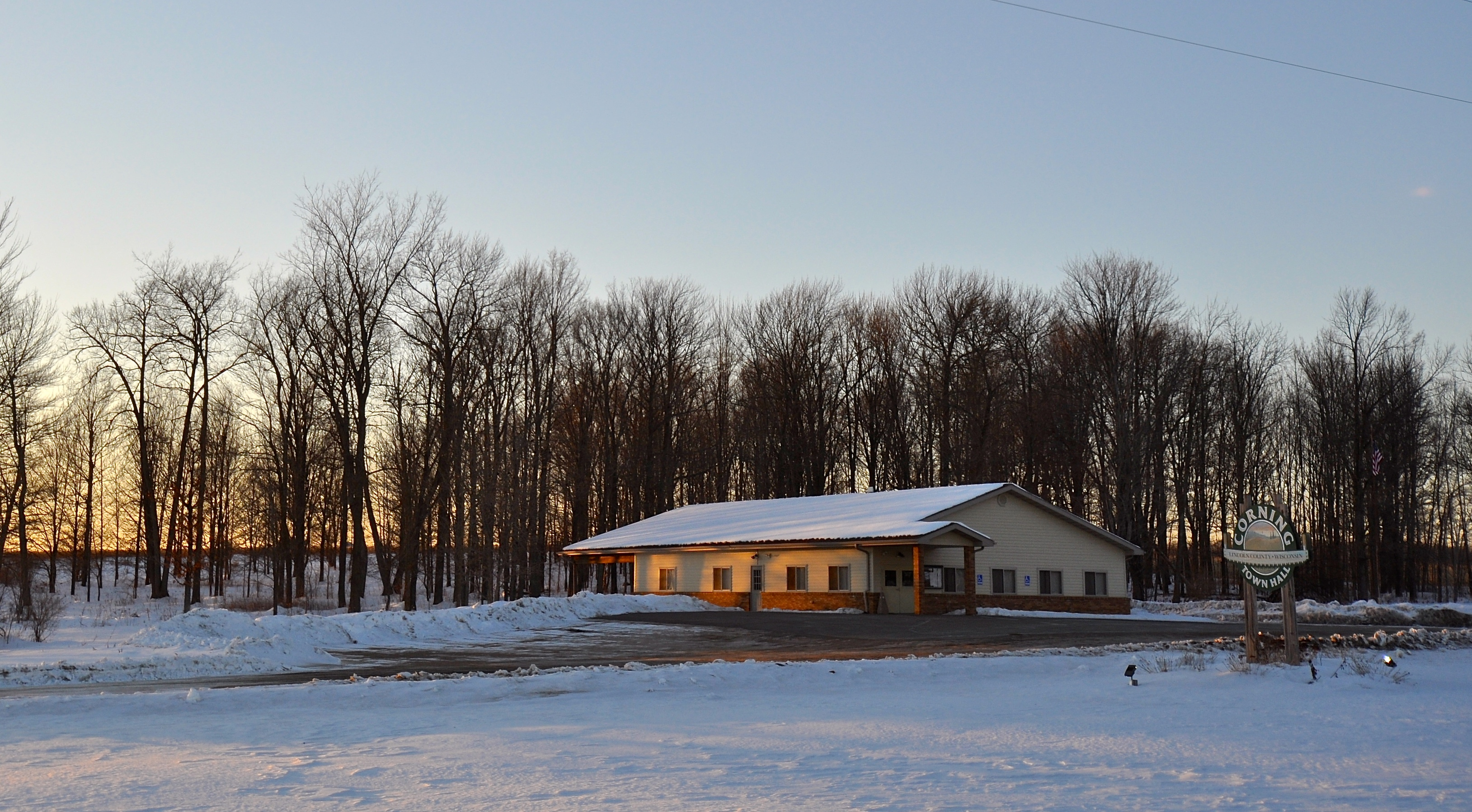
- Corning Town Hall, February 2015

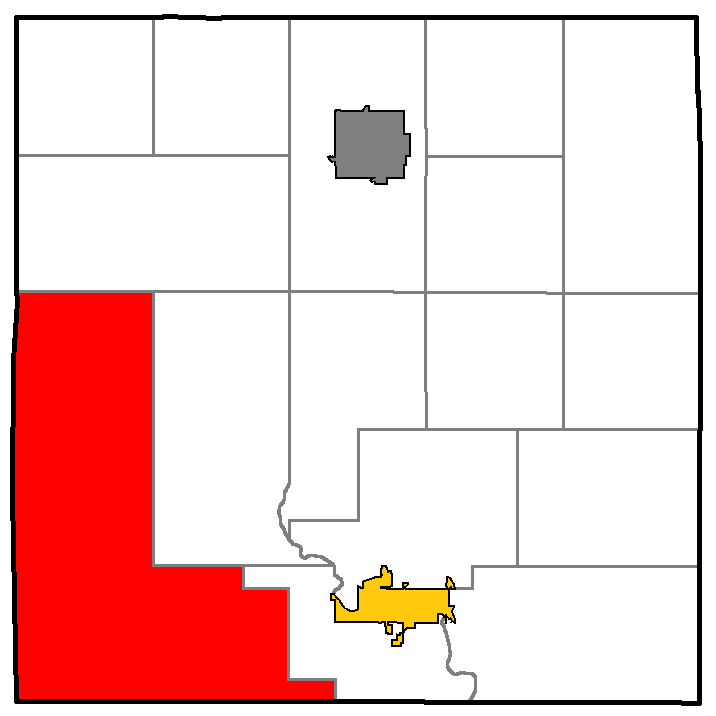
- Location of Corning, within Lincoln County

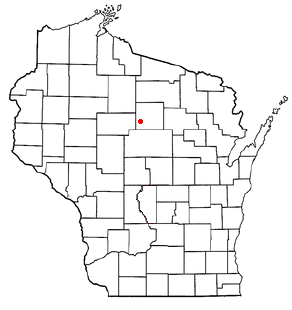
- Location of Corning, Wisconsin
- Coordinates: 45°11′27″N 89°54′6″W
- Country: United States
- State: Wisconsin
- County: Lincoln

Area
  - Total: 146.6 sq mi (379.8 km^{2})
  - Land: 146.4 sq mi (379.2 km^{2})
  - Water: 0.23 sq mi (0.6 km^{2})
- Elevation: 1,388 ft (423 m)

Population (2020)
  - Total: 825
  - Density: 5.63/sq mi (2.18/km^{2})
- Time zone: UTC-6 (Central (CST))
  - Summer (DST): UTC-5 (CDT)
- ZIP Code: 54452 (Merrill)
- Area codes: 715 & 534
- FIPS code: 55-17125
- GNIS feature ID: 1583017
- Website: tn.corning.wi.gov

Corning is a town in Lincoln County, Wisconsin, United States. The population was 825 at the 2020 census, down from 883 at the 2010 census.

== Geography ==
Corning occupies the western side and southwestern corner of Lincoln County. It is the largest town in the county by area, with a total area of 146.6 square miles (379.8 km^{2}), of which 146.4 square miles (379.2 km^{2}) are land and 0.2 square miles (0.6 km^{2}), or 0.17%, are water.

The town is drained primarily by the Copper River and New Wood River and their tributaries, flowing east to the Wisconsin River above Merrill. The southwestern corner of Corning is drained by the Big Rib River, which flows south and east to the Wisconsin River at Wausau.

== Demographics ==
As of the census of 2020, there were 825 people, 329 households residing in the town. There were 375 housing units. The racial makeup of the town was 95.88% White, 0.5% Asian, 0.2% Native American, 0.1% from other races, and 3.3% two or more races. Hispanic or Latino people of any race were 1.3% of the population.

As of the census of 2000, there were 826 people, 299 households, and 246 families residing in the town. The population density was 5.6 people per square mile (2.2/km^{2}). There were 392 housing units at an average density of 2.7 per square mile (1/km^{2}). The racial makeup of the town was 99.15% White, 0.12% Native American, 0.24% from other races, and 0.48% from two or more races. Hispanic or Latino people of any race were 0.36% of the population.

There were 299 households, out of which 36.5% had children under the age of 18 living with them, 69.6% were married couples living together, 6% had a female householder with no husband present, and 17.4% were non-families. 13.4% of all households were made up of individuals, and 4% had someone living alone who was 65 years of age or older. The average household size was 2.76 and the average family size was 3.04.

In the town, the population was spread out, with 26.8% under the age of 18, 6.4% from 18 to 24, 31.1% from 25 to 44, 24.1% from 45 to 64, and 11.6% who were 65 years of age or older. The median age was 38 years. For every 100 females, there were 107.5 males. For every 100 females age 18 and over, there were 106.5 males.

The median income for a household in the town was $48,224, and the median income for a family was $50,132. Males had a median income of $31,413 versus $22,404 for females. The per capita income for the town was $19,225. About 3.5% of families and 4.4% of the population were below the poverty line, including 6.3% of those under age 18 and 4.4% of those age 65 or over.
