= West Branch Sugar River =

Location
- Country: United States
- State: Wisconsin
- City: Mount Horeb

Physical characteristics
- Source
  - coordinates: 43.002°N 89.754°W
- Mouth
  - coordinates: 42.8733°N 89.5565°W
- Length: 22.3 mi (35.9 km)
- Basin size: 66.74 sq mi (172.9 km^{2})

Basin features
- River system: Sugar River (Wisconsin)
- Tributaries
  - left: Deer Creek, Fryes Feeder, Mt. Vernon Creek
  - right: Primrose Branch, Milum Creek

The West Branch Sugar River is a tributary of the Sugar River, about 22.3 miles (36 km) long, in south central Wisconsin in the United States. Via the Sugar, Pecatonica, and Rock Rivers, it is part of the watershed of the Mississippi River. Its watershed lies entirely within Dane County.

== Course ==
The West Branch Sugar River rises in southeastern Dane County just west of Mount Horeb and follows a generally southeasterly course through the county. It flows into the Sugar River about 2 miles (3.2 km) west of Belleville in Montrose, near the intersection of County Highway PB and Walter Road.

Its main tributary is Mt. Vernon Creek, which is formed from the confluence of Deer Creek and Fryes Feeder and empties into the West Branch Sugar River in Primrose near the intersection of WI-92 and County Road A. There is a small dam where County Highway G crosses the creek in the unincorporated community of Mount Vernon. Other tributaries include Flynn Creek, Milum Creek, and the Primrose Branch.

The watershed, including portions of Blue Mounds, Springdale, Verona, Montrose, Primrose, and Perry and is mostly rural; the only village in the watershed is Mount Horeb. U.S. Route 18 passes through the northern part of the watershed, and Wisconsin Highway 92 crosses through it from northwest to southeast.

== Geography ==
The region is predominantly agricultural, with some wetlands, grassland, and forested areas. The Wisconsin DNR labels the majority of the land type as the Platteville savannah: "the characteristic landform pattern is sloping with summits, shoulders, and backslopes of ridges common. Soils are well drained silt loam." The southeastern portion of the watershed is labeled as the Sugar River Valley: "undulating valley floor with floodplains, terraces, beaches, lake plains and scattered bedrock knolls. Soils are predominantly well drained loam and silt over gravelly sandy outwash, silty alluvium, silty and clayey lacustrine, or silty loess." The original vegetation cover consists primarily of oak forest, prairie, marsh and sedge meadow, wet prairie, and lowland shrubs.

The West Branch Sugar River is part of the larger Sugar Pecatonica Basin. The 156.64 miles (250 km) of the streams comprising the West Branch Sugar River watershed cover 66.74 square miles (173 km^{2}), or 42713 acres, with 9.41 acres covered by unnamed lakes and 1131.91 acres of wetlands.

== Conservation ==
The river's watershed includes extensive wetlands, some of which are in the process of restoration. The only noted aquatic invasive is reed canary grass along much of the downstream wetlands. With the help of the Upper Sugar River Watershed Association, the river was delisted in 2004 from the 303(d) list of the Clean Water Act, the first one in Wisconsin to be so removed. Prior to this the river had been impaired by contaminated fish tissue (mercury) and degraded habitat (sediment and suspended solids) exceeding its total maximum daily load. In fact, almost all of Deer Creek, Fryes Feeder, Flynn Creek, and Milum Creek, as well as part of Mt. Vernon Creek, have been designated exceptional or outstanding streams. The majority of the river's course and tributaries are designated Class 1 and Class 2 trout stream lines, and a small stretch of the river is designated wadable cool water for smallmouth bass by the Wisconsin DNR.

Additionally, Dane County has been granted both Large and Small Scale Lake Protection Grants which include the West Branch Sugar River watershed. There are two DNR managed lands, both a part of the Mount Vernon Creek Fishery Area.

== See also ==
- List of rivers of Wisconsin
