= Totagatic River =

River in Wisconsin, United States

Coordinates: 46.08355°N 92.09213°W

The Totagatic River (generally pronounced To-TA-ga-tik) is an 80.0-mile-long (128.7 km) tributary of the Namekagon River in northwestern Wisconsin in the United States. Via the Namekagon and St. Croix rivers, it is part of the watershed of the Mississippi River. According to the Geographic Names Information System, the river's name has also been historically spelled Togatatic and Totogatic. Its name is derived from the Ojibwe language Dootoogaatig-ziibi meaning "River of Boggy Riverway" (or literally, "River of spongy-ground river-course"), due to its course through wetlands.

The Totagatic is formed by the confluence of its short east and west forks in southwestern Bayfield County, and flows generally westwardly through Sawyer, Washburn, Douglas and Burnett counties, passing through several lakes. It joins the Namekagon River in Burnett County, 45 miles (72 km) south of the city of Superior. In Douglas County, it receives the Ounce River.

== See also ==
- List of rivers of Wisconsin
- Nelson Lake (Wisconsin)
