= Ounce River =

River in Wisconsin, United States

Coordinates: 46.16800°N 91.69380°W

The Ounce River is a 25.2-mile-long (40.6 km) tributary of the Totagatic River in northwestern Wisconsin in the United States. Via the Totagatic, Namekagon and St. Croix rivers, it is part of the watershed of the Mississippi River. It rises in southwestern Bayfield County and flows southwestwardly into southeastern Douglas County, where it joins the Totagatic.

The U.S. Board on Geographic Names settled on "Ounce River" as the stream's name in 1938. According to the Geographic Names Information System, it has also been known historically as the "Ounse River", "Owense River", shortened from "Totacaticonce River" and "Totogaticanse River", thereby meaning "Small Totagatic River", where "Totogatic River" (Doodoogaatig-ziibi in the Ojibwemowin) means "River of Boggy Riverway"; thus, Dootoogaatigoons-ziibi means a "River of a Small and Boggy Riverway." The suffix ens on a consonant stemmed word or oons on a w-stemmed word in Ojibwemowin indicates "little" or "small".

== See also ==
- List of rivers of Wisconsin
