= Bark River (Rock River tributary) =

River in Wisconsin, United States

Coordinates: 42.92528°N 88.82594°W

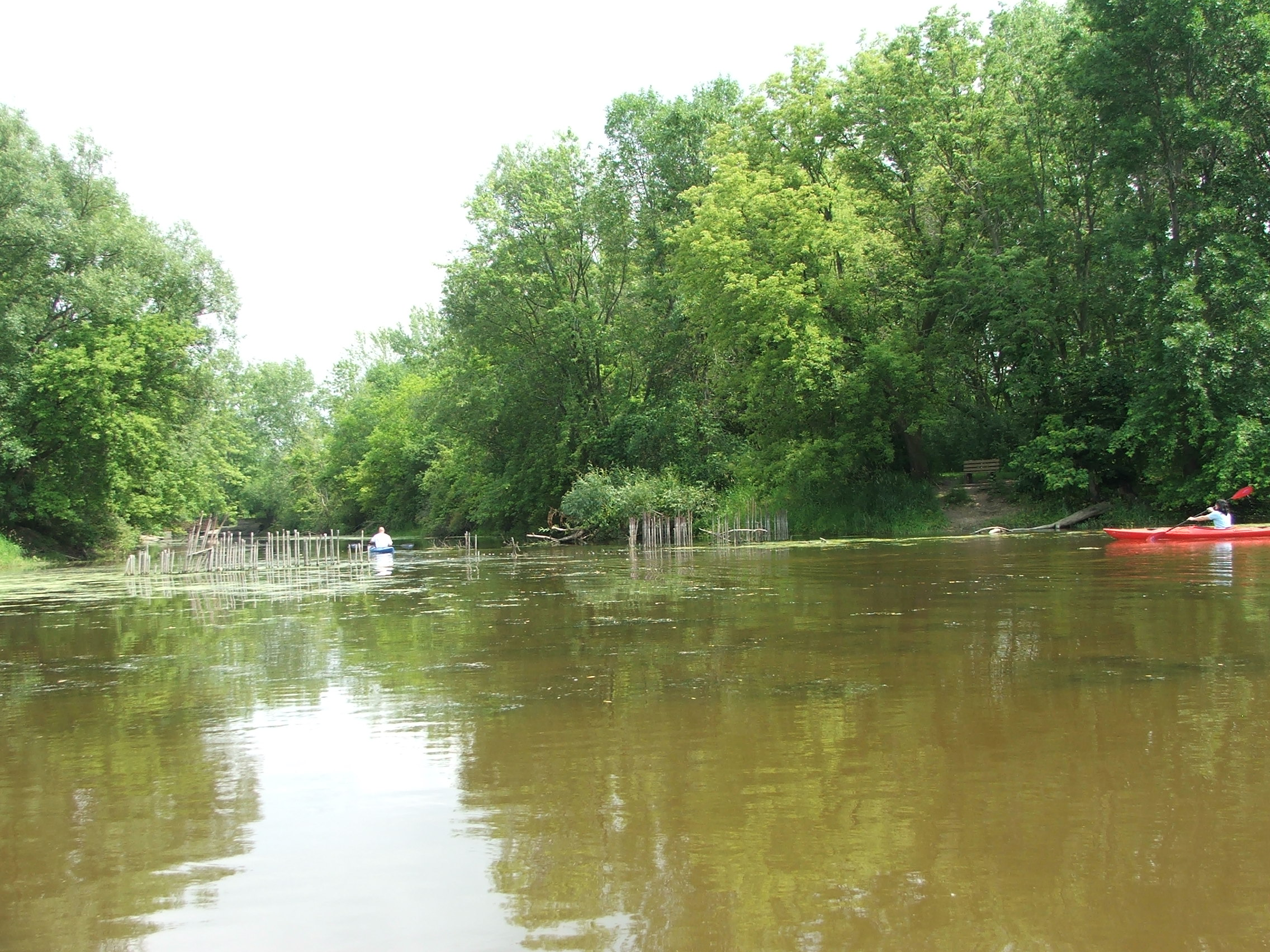

Location
- Country: United States
- State: Wisconsin

The Bark River is a tributary of the Rock River, about 67.5 miles (108.6 km) long, in southeastern Wisconsin in the United States. Via the Rock River, it is part of the watershed of the Mississippi River. According to the Geographic Names Information System, it has also been known historically as the "Peelbark River". The Bark River rises in southern Washington County at Bark Lake In Richfield, WI and flows generally southwestwardly through Waukesha and Jefferson counties, past the communities of Hartland, Delafield, Summit Dousman and Rome, and through several small lakes. It joins the Rock River in Jefferson County just east of Fort Atkinson. In Jefferson County the Bark River collects the Scuppernong River.

== See also ==
- List of Wisconsin rivers
