= Popple River (Pine River tributary) =

River in the U.S. state of Wisconsin

- Location of the mouth of Popple River

Location
- Country: United States
- State: Wisconsin
- Counties: Forest, Florence

Physical characteristics
- Source
  - location: Town of Argonne
  - coordinates: 45.7624605°N 88.8281727°W
  - elevation: 1,617 ft (493 m)
- Mouth: Pine River
  - location: Town of Fern
  - coordinates: 45.8399559°N 88.3401283°W
  - elevation: 1,240 ft (380 m)
- Length: 47 mi (76 km)
- Basin size: 148,000 sq mi (380,000 km^{2})

Popple River is a tributary of the Pine River in the northeastern portion of the U.S. state of Wisconsin. The river is part of the Menominee River watershed and flows for 47 miles (76 km) in Forest and Florence counties, draining an area of 148,000 acres (60,000 ha).

Popple River rises in the town of Argonne in northern Forest County and flows east through the Nicolet National Forest, running through the community of Popple River. The river continues through southern Florence County, eventually leaving the forest and heading north to its mouth at the Pine River.

According to the Wisconsin Department of Natural Resources, the Popple River watershed includes 236 miles (380 km) of streams, 1,758 acres (711 ha) of lakes, and 35,875 acres (14,518 ha) of wetlands. 74% of the watershed is forested, while 24% is wetland area.

== See also ==
- List of rivers of Wisconsin
