= West Twin River (Wisconsin) =

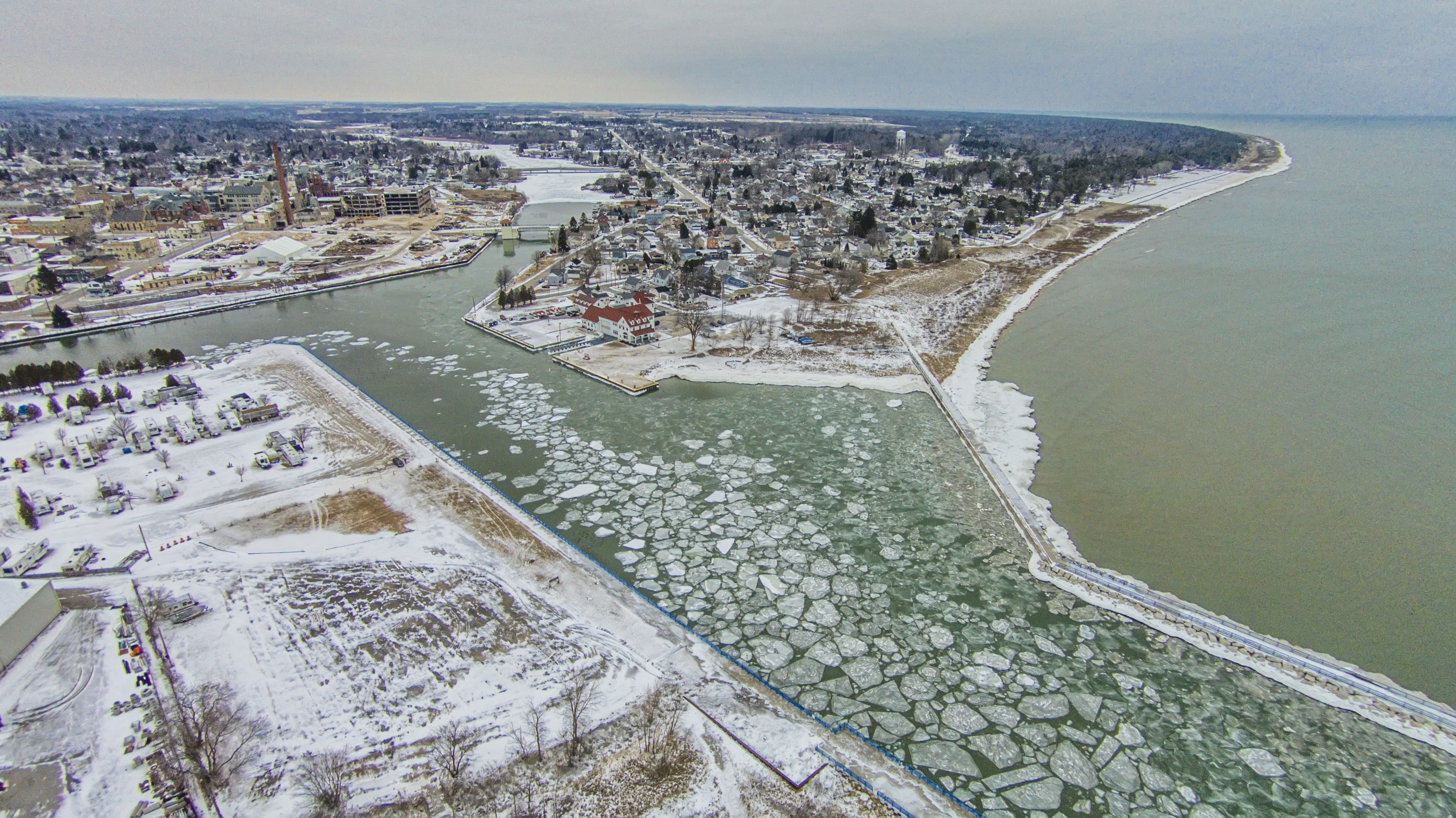
- East Twin and West Twin rivers meet at the Two Rivers harbor before journeying into Lake Michigan.

- Location within Wisconsin Location within the United States

Location
- Country: United States
- State: Wisconsin

Physical characteristics
- Source
  - location: Confluence of the Devils River and the Neshota River
  - coordinates: 44.2974944°N 87.7717564°W
- Mouth
  - location: Confluence with the East Twin River at Two Rivers, Wisconsin
  - coordinates: 44.1449957°N 87.5625810°W
  - elevation: 581 feet (177 m)
- Length: 18.5 miles (29.8 km)
- Basin size: 176 square miles (460 km^{2})

Basin features
- Progression: South-southeast and east
- River system: West Twin River

The West Twin River, formerly the Neshota River, is an 18.5-mile-long (29.8 km) river in east-central Wisconsin that is a tributary to Lake Michigan. It merges with the East Twin River in the city of Two Rivers, Wisconsin, less than a mile from the lakeshore. The source of the river is in southeast Brown County, near Richard J. Drumm Memorial Forest. It is formed by the confluence of the Devils River and the Neshota River. On its course it passes through the unincorporated communities of Kingsbridge and Shoto.

About 6 miles (10 km) upstream from its mouth, the West Twin River is blocked by Shoto Dam, which divides the river into upper and lower reaches. The river below Shoto Dam is broad, shallow, and slow and the water quality is poor, while above the dam it is narrow, deep, and fast-flowing with good to excellent water quality. Shoto Dam creates a 55-acre (22 ha) reservoir known as Shoto Lake.

== Major tributaries ==
Major tributaries of the West Twin River include:

- Black (Buck) Creek
- Devils River
- Francis Creek
- King Creek
- Kriwanek Creek
- Neshota River
- Twin Hill Creek

== See also ==
- List of rivers of Wisconsin
