= Killsnake River =

River and state wildlife area in Wisconsin, US

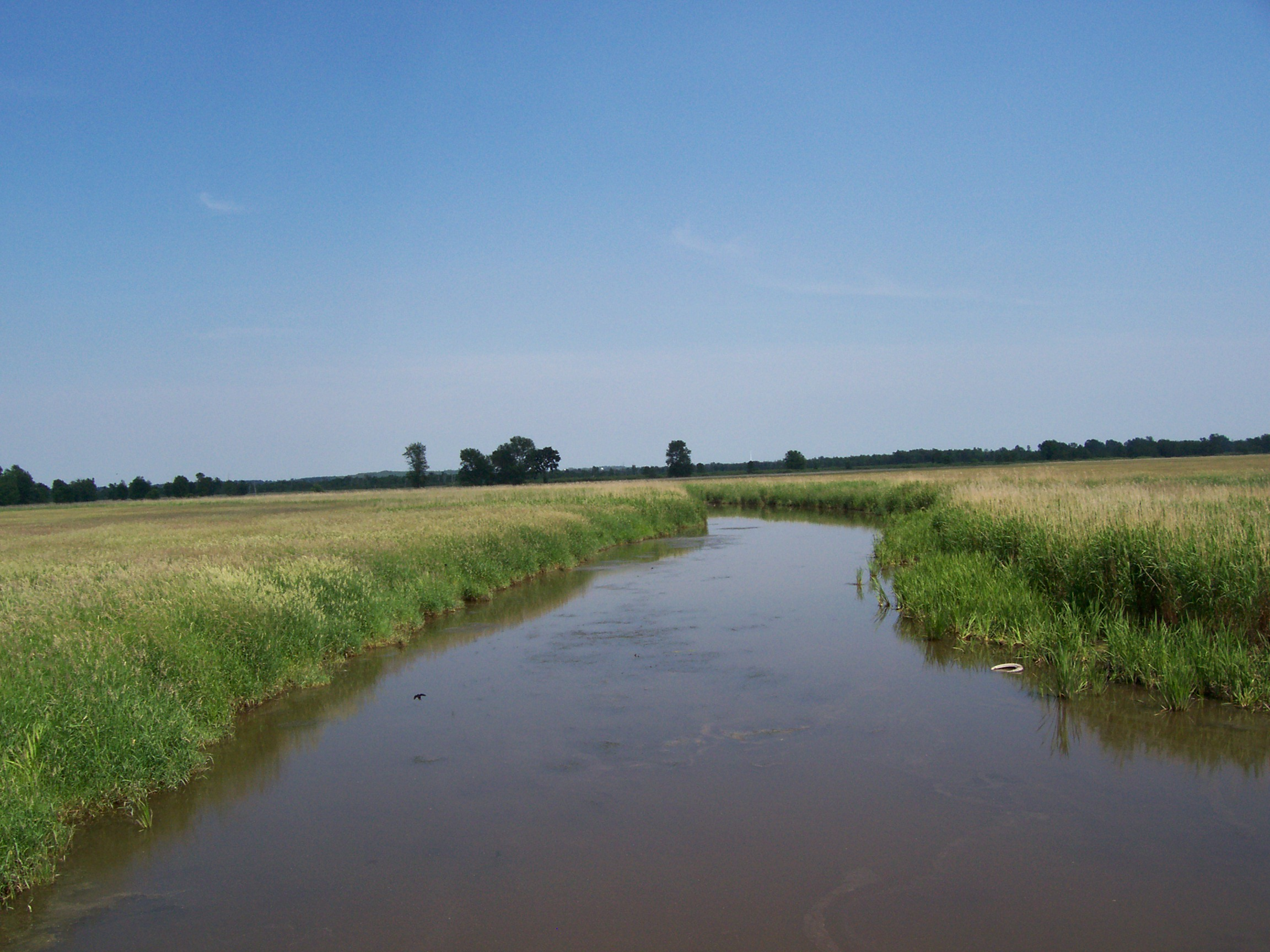
The Killsnake River near its junction with the Manitowoc River

The Killsnake River is a 19.7-mile-long (31.7 km) river in eastern Wisconsin in the United States. It is a tributary of the South Branch of the Manitowoc River, which flows to Lake Michigan.

The river flows for its entire course in central Calumet County. It rises about 3 miles (5 km) east of Lake Winnebago and flows generally east-southeastwardly; it joins the South Branch of the Manitowoc River about 6 miles (10 km) east of Chilton in the Killsnake Wildlife Area.

== Killsnake Wildlife Area ==
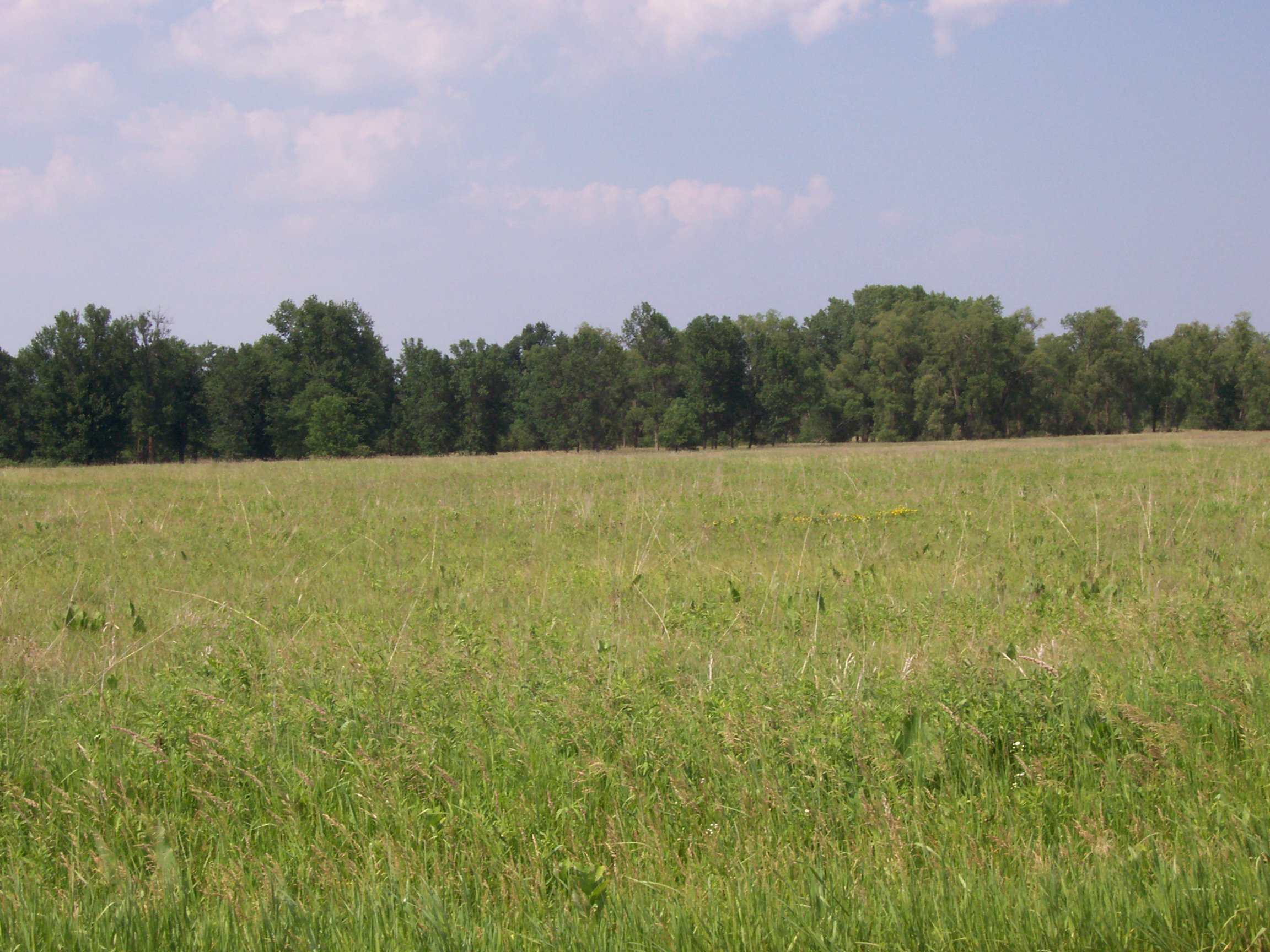
Killsnake Wildlife Area near Chilton, Wisconsin

The 5,777 acres (23.38 km^{2}) surrounding the confluence of the Killsnake River with the South Branch Manitowoc River has been designated a wildlife refuge by the Wisconsin Department of Natural Resources. The area is located entirely in the town of Rantoul.

=== Registered historic area ===
There are four archaeological sites ranging from a major Early Paleo-Indian campsite from 9000 BC to a Potawatomi village from the mid-19th century AD located in the wildlife area, and the site is listed on the National Register of Historic Places.

== See also ==
- List of Wisconsin rivers
