= Branch River (Wisconsin) =

River in Wisconsin, United States

Coordinates: 44.12972°N 87.76842°W

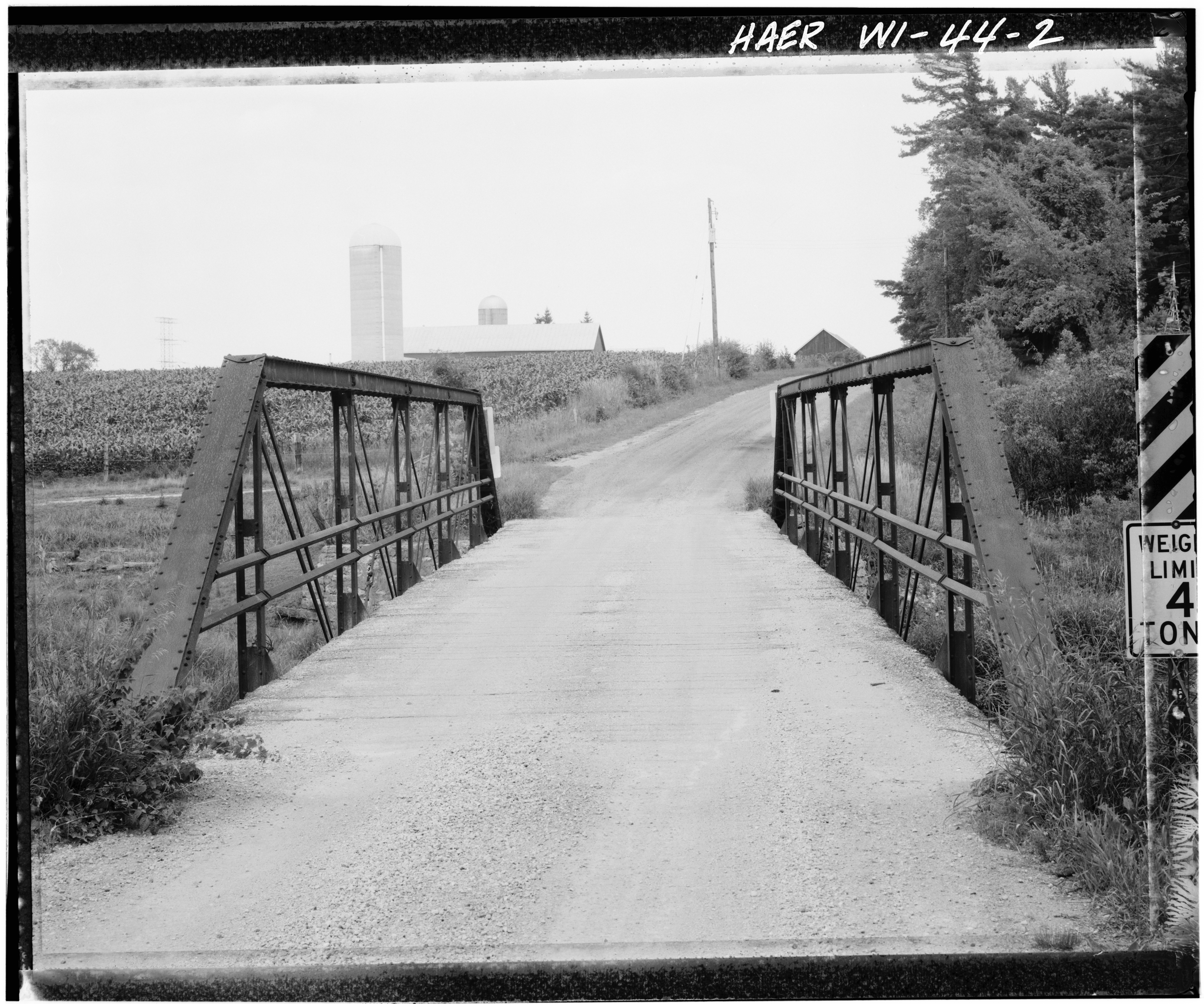
Bridge over Branch River

The Branch River is a 36.9-mile-long (59.4 km) river in eastern Wisconsin in the United States. It is a tributary of the Manitowoc River, which flows to Lake Michigan.

The Branch River rises in Brown County about 10 miles (16 km) south of Green Bay, and flows generally southeastwardly into Manitowoc County. It joins the Manitowoc River about 6 miles (10 km) west of the city of Manitowoc.

According to the Geographic Names Information System, the river has also been known as the "Center River" and as the "Centre River". The United States Board on Geographic Names settled on "Branch River" as the stream's official name in 1912.

== See also ==
- List of Wisconsin rivers

== Sources ==
- DeLorme (1992). Wisconsin Atlas & Gazetteer. Freeport, Maine: DeLorme. ISBN 0-89933-247-1.
- U.S. Geological Survey Geographic Names Information System: Branch River
