= Narrows Creek =

Stream in Sauk County, Wisconsin, U.S.

Coordinates: 43°28′43″N 89°54′58″W

Narrows Creek is a stream in Sauk County, Wisconsin, in the United States. It is a tributary of the Baraboo River.

Narrows Creek flows through narrows, hence the name.

== See also ==
- List of rivers of Wisconsin
