= Clam Falls (community), Wisconsin =

Clam Falls, Wisconsin
- Unincorporated community
- Location within Wisconsin Location within the United States
- Coordinates: 45°41′19″N 92°17′37″W
- Country: United States
- State: Wisconsin
- County: Polk
- Elevation: 1,043 ft (318 m)
- Time zone: UTC-6 (Central (CST))
  - Summer (DST): UTC-5 (CDT)
- Area codes: 715 & 534
- GNIS feature ID: 1563101

Clam Falls is an unincorporated community located in the town of Clam Falls, Polk County, Wisconsin, United States. Clam Falls is 8.5 miles (13.7 km) east-northeast of Frederic.The majority of the residents work outside of the township. The township is over 50% forested. Agriculture assumes fewer than 30% of the land base.
