= Lewis, Wisconsin =

Census-designated place in Wisconsin, United States

- Census-designated place
- Location within Wisconsin
- Coordinates: 45°42′39″N 92°24′09″W
- Country: United States
- State: Wisconsin
- County: Polk

Area
  - Total: 1.460 sq mi (3.78 km^{2})
  - Land: 1.454 sq mi (3.77 km^{2})
  - Water: 0.006 sq mi (0.016 km^{2})
- Elevation: 1,050 ft (320 m)

Population (2020)
  - Total: 87
  - Density: 60/sq mi (23/km^{2})
- Time zone: UTC-6 (Central (CST))
  - Summer (DST): UTC-5 (CDT)
- Area codes: 715 & 534
- GNIS feature ID: 1567997

Lewis is an unincorporated census-designated place in the town of Clam Falls, Polk County, Wisconsin, United States. Lewis is located on Wisconsin Highway 35, 4.5 miles (7.2 km) northeast of Frederic. As of the 2020 census, its population was 87.

Historical population
Census	Pop.	Note	%±
2010	164		—
2020	87		−47.0%
U.S. Decennial Census

== History ==
The town is named for founder Charles E. Lewis, a Minnesota wheat broker who purchased a large tract of land in Clam Falls Township around the turn of the 20th century. His personal estate, "Seven Pines Lodge", attracted several prominent guests throughout the 1920s, including President Calvin Coolidge, and is maintained as a private resort complex to this day. Knapp Creek, the abutting stream once referred to as "[a] trout preserve which is second to none in this country", continues to be classified as a Class I trout stream. However, much of the stream runs through private property and is not accessible as a public fishery. Like many in the area, the town has seen steady decline in population and economic base since the demise of the logging and railroad industries.
