= Clam Falls, Wisconsin =

- Town
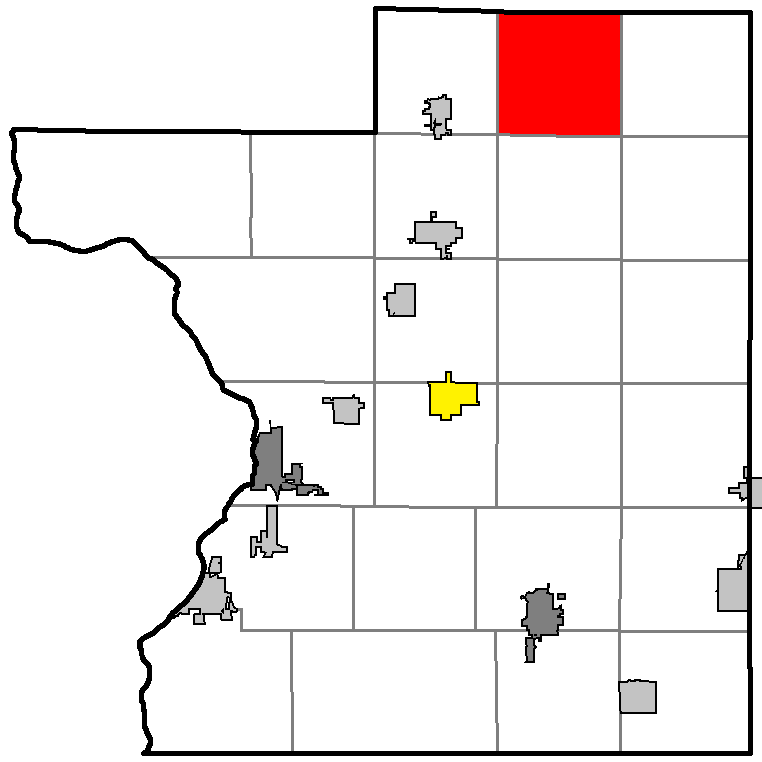
- Location of Clam Falls, Polk County

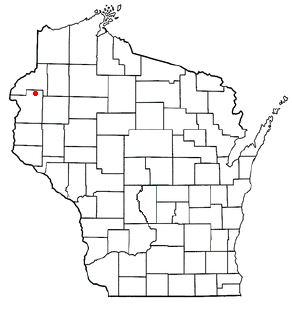
- Location of Clam Falls, Wisconsin
- Coordinates: 45°41′19″N 92°21′34″W
- Country: United States
- State: Wisconsin
- County: Polk

Area
  - Total: 35.4 sq mi (91.7 km^{2})
  - Land: 34.7 sq mi (89.8 km^{2})
  - Water: 0.73 sq mi (1.9 km^{2})
- Elevation: 1,109 ft (338 m)

Population (2020)
  - Total: 554
  - Density: 16.0/sq mi (6.17/km^{2})
- Time zone: UTC-6 (Central (CST))
  - Summer (DST): UTC-5 (CDT)
- Area codes: 715 & 534
- FIPS code: 55-14837
- GNIS feature ID: 1582963
- Website: http://www.townofclamfalls.com/

Clam Falls is a town in Polk County, Wisconsin, United States. The population was 554 at the 2020 census. The unincorporated communities of Clam Falls and Lewis are located in the town.

== History ==
Before the Clam River was dammed and logging began, the area around present-day Clam Falls had long been peopled by Native Americans, who called the location Cobbekonta, or "Little Falls", while the Clam River was known as Kenesca-Seba--"Clam-Shell River". The St. Croix Band of Lake Superior Chippewa Indians still inhabit the area, where they are engaged in harvesting wild rice, hunting, fishing, and maple sugaring.

The present Town of Clam Falls is situated on the east bank of Clam Flowage, which is formed by a dam at the confluence of McKenzie Creek and the Clam River. The east and west bank of the river were the location of logging operations since the late 1840s, and the dam was constructed in 1859 by Daniel F. Smith. Smith would go on to improve the Butternut Road, which became known as the Clam Falls Road—a highly travelled roadway extending from Clam Falls to Butternut Lake near present-day Luck. Traces of the road are still visible, and signs continue to mark its former path, which crisscrosses modern-day County Road I.

== Geography ==
According to the United States Census Bureau, the town has a total area of 35.4 square miles (91.7 km^{2}), of which 34.7 square miles (89.8 km^{2}) is land and 0.7 square mile (1.9 km^{2}) (2.03%) is water.

== Demographics ==
As of the census of 2000, there were 547 people, 237 households, and 167 families residing in the town. The population density was 15.8 people per square mile (6.1/km^{2}). There were 352 housing units at an average density of 10.1 per square mile (3.9/km^{2}). The racial makeup of the town was 96.71% White, 0.18% African American, 0.91% Native American, 0.55% Asian, and 1.65% from two or more races. Hispanic or Latino of any race were 0.55% of the population.

There were 237 households, out of which 24.9% had children under the age of 18 living with them, 59.5% were married couples living together, 5.9% had a female householder with no husband present, and 29.5% were non-families. 27.0% of all households were made up of individuals, and 12.2% had someone living alone who was 65 years of age or older. The average household size was 2.31 and the average family size was 2.75.

In the town, the population was spread out, with 19.7% under the age of 18, 7.3% from 18 to 24, 25.0% from 25 to 44, 28.0% from 45 to 64, and 19.9% who were 65 years of age or older. The median age was 44 years. For every 100 females, there were 101.1 males. For every 100 females age 18 and over, there were 108.1 males.

The median income for a household in the town was $34,844, and the median income for a family was $38,500. Males had a median income of $32,500 versus $25,750 for females. The per capita income for the town was $16,550. About 10.1% of families and 9.6% of the population were below the poverty line, including 7.8% of those under age 18 and 9.8% of those age 65 or over.
