= Calamus Creek (Wisconsin) =

Location
- Country: United States
- State: Wisconsin

Physical characteristics
- Source
  - coordinates: 43.4055°N 88.9600°W
- Mouth
  - coordinates: 43.394°N 88.869°W
- Length: 23.7 mi (38.1 km)
- Basin size: 30.18 mi^{2} (78.2 km^{2})

Basin features
- River system: Beaver Dam River

Calamus Creek is a minor tributary of the Beaver Dam River, about 23.7 miles (38.1 km) long, in southeastern Wisconsin in the United States. Via the Beaver Dam, Crawfish, and Rock rivers, it is part of the watershed of the Mississippi River. Its watershed lies almost entirely within Dodge County with a small portion in neighboring Columbia County.

== Course ==
Calamus Creek rises in west central Dodge County near the intersection of Mt. Pleasant and Van Buren roads and follows a highly winding, generally easterly course through Dodge County. It flows into the Beaver Dam River about 3 miles (5 km) southwest of Beaver Dam, near the intersection of County Roads J and G. Thirteen minor streams empty into the creek along its course.

The relatively small watershed, contained mostly within the town of Calamus, is entirely rural with no cities or villages. U.S. Route 151 passes through it, as well as the Adams subdivision of the Union Pacific Railroad.

== Geography ==
The region is predominantly agricultural, with some wetlands, grassland, and forested areas. The Wisconsin DNR labels the land type as the Beaver Dam drumlins, a land formation marked by till plains and terminal moraines created during the Wisconsin Ice Age: "the characteristic landform pattern is rolling till plain with drumlins and scattered muck deposits. Soils are predominantly well drained silt over calcareous sandy loam till." The original vegetation cover is primarily white oak, black oak, bur oak, marsh and sedge meadow, wet prairie, and lowland shrubs.

Calamus Creek is part of the larger Upper Rock River Basin. The 57.33 miles (92 km) of the streams comprising the Calamus Creek watershed cover 30.18 square miles (78 km^{2}), or 19315 acres, with 54.39 acres covered by five unnamed lakes and 3627.39 acres of wetlands.

== Conservation ==
The watershed includes extensive wetlands, some of which are in the process of restoration. Parts of Calamus Creek are designated wadable nursery waters for smallmouth bass by the Wisconsin DNR, but the creek's rated condition for fish and aquatic life is poor as of 2010. Its entire course is also listed as impaired due to nonpoint sources, mostly sediment and suspended solids. This signifies that the water quality does not allow the creek to meet its designated use, necessitating a water quality improvement plan. The creek's total maximum daily load planning is still in development. Additionally, Dodge County has been granted both a Large Scale Lake Planning Grant and Lake Protection Grant which includes the county's majority portion of the Calamus Creek watershed. There are several DNR managed lands, including two areas of glacial habitat restoration.

== See also ==
- List of rivers of Wisconsin
