= Big River (Wisconsin) =

River in Wisconsin, United States

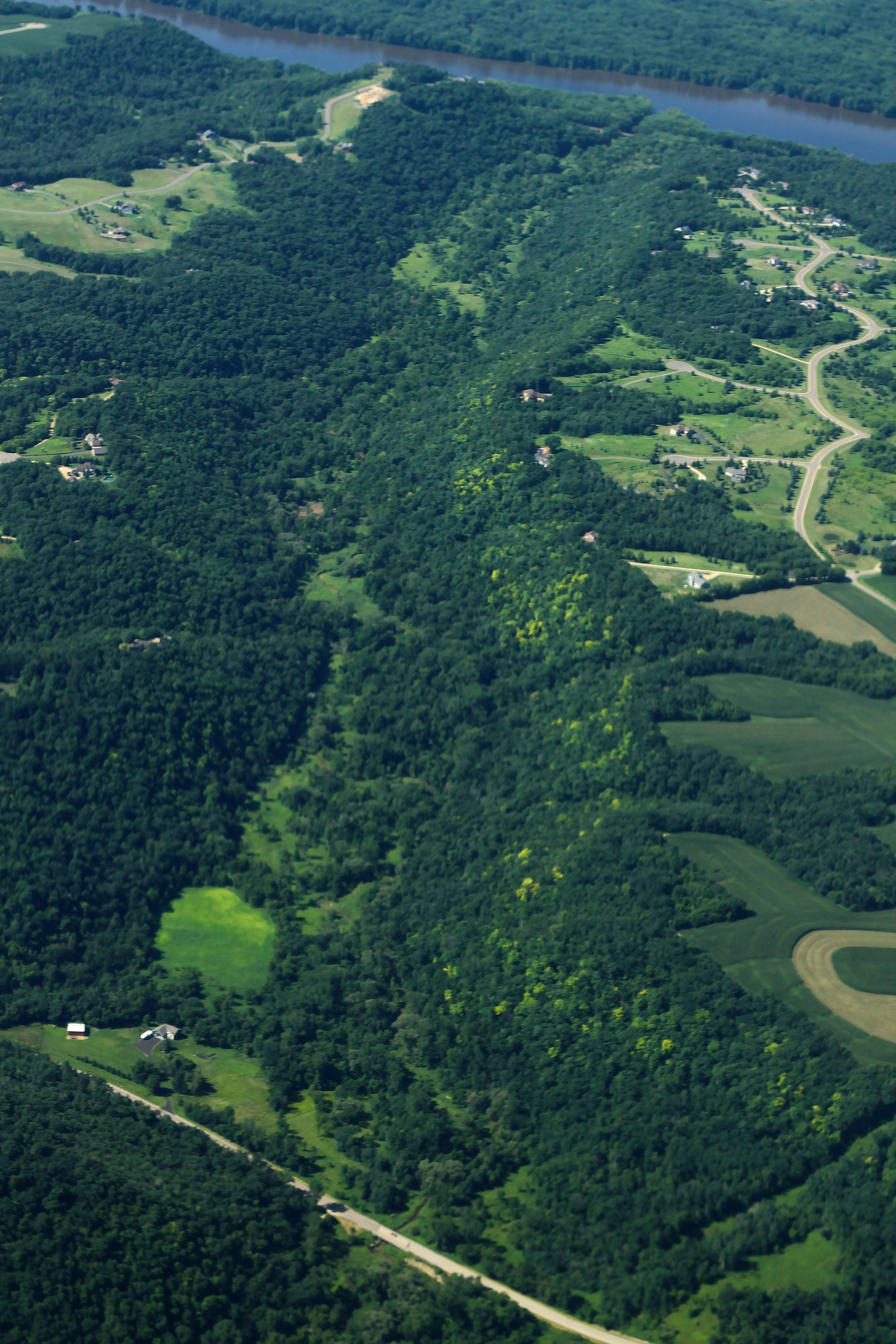
- Aerial shot of Big River in Wisconsin

- Location within Wisconsin

Physical characteristics
- Mouth
  - coordinates: 44°41′34″N 92°41′52″W

The Big River is a minor tributary of the Mississippi River in western Wisconsin in the United States. It flows for its entire 12.8-mile (20.6 km) length in western Pierce County, rising in the town of River Falls and flowing south-southwestwardly into the town of Oak Grove. It enters the Mississippi River about 6 miles (10 km) southeast of Prescott.

== See also ==
- List of Wisconsin rivers
