= Neshota River =

Location
- Country: United States

Physical characteristics
- Source
  - location: Just north of Denmark, Wisconsin
- Mouth
  - location: Confluence with the West Twin River near Maribel, Wisconsin
  - coordinates: 44°17′52″N 87°46′18″W
- Length: 17.22 mi (27.71 km)
- Basin size: West Twin River

Basin features
- Progression: South-southeast and east
- River system: West Twin River

Neshota River is a 17.22-mile-long (27.71 km) river in east-central Wisconsin It passes by the Richard J. Drumm Memorial Forest before merging with the Devils River to form the West Twin River north of Cherney Maribel Caves County Park. The source of the river is located in southeastern Brown County, Wisconsin.

The water quality of the river is fair near Neshota County Park, but the quality deteriorates quickly, as it is impacted by runoff from nearby farms. A large manure spill in the 1990s contributed to the poor quality of river.

The city of Two Rivers, Wisconsin was named for the confluence of the Neshota River and what was then known as the Mishicott River. The Mishicott River has since been renamed the East Twin River.

== Major tributaries ==
Major tributaries of the Neshota River include:

- Black Creek
- Denmark Creek
- King Creek
