= Manitowoc River =

River in eastern Wisconsin, US

Coordinates: 44.0919°N 87.6514°W

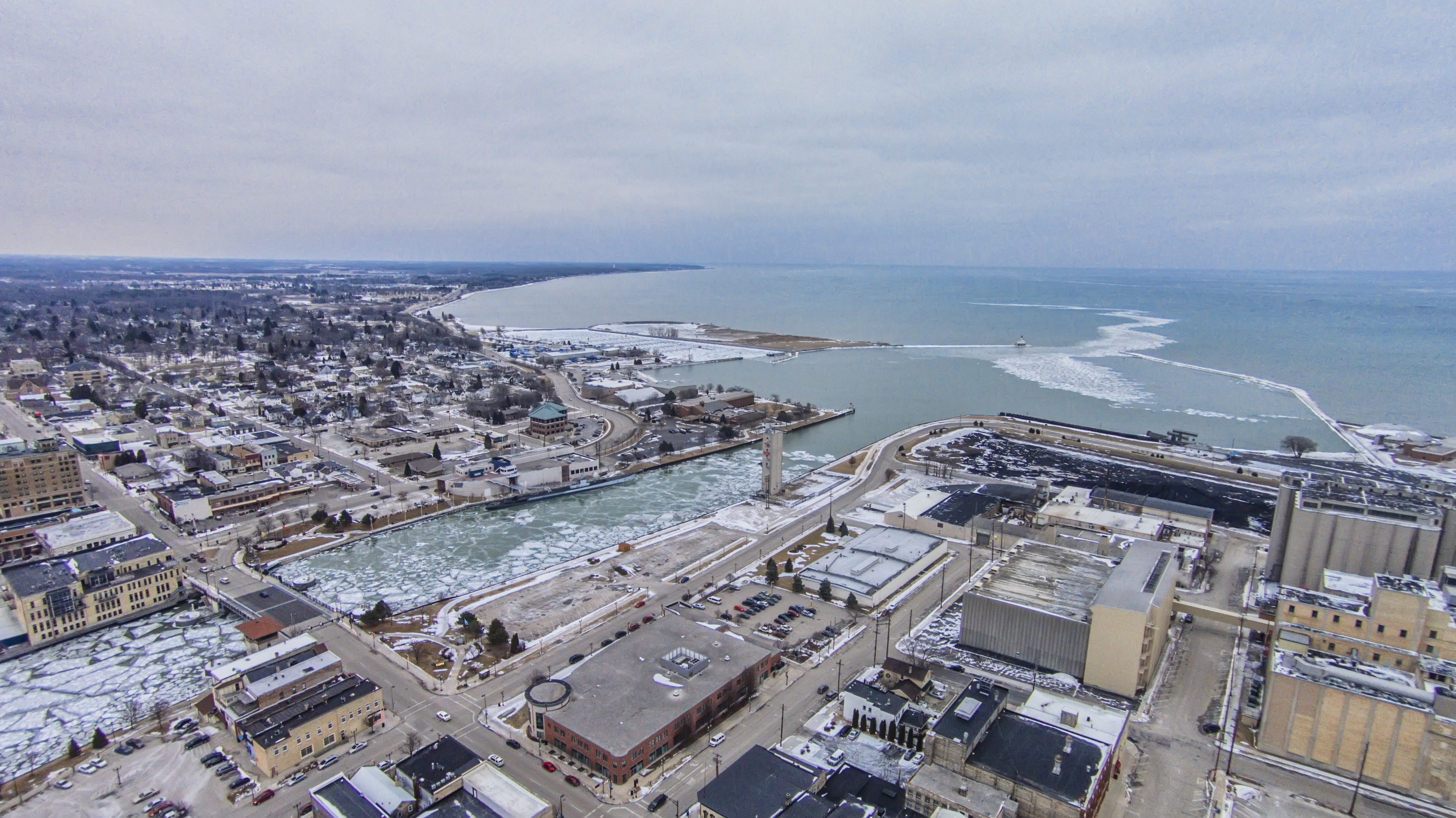
The Manitowoc River empties into Lake Michigan.

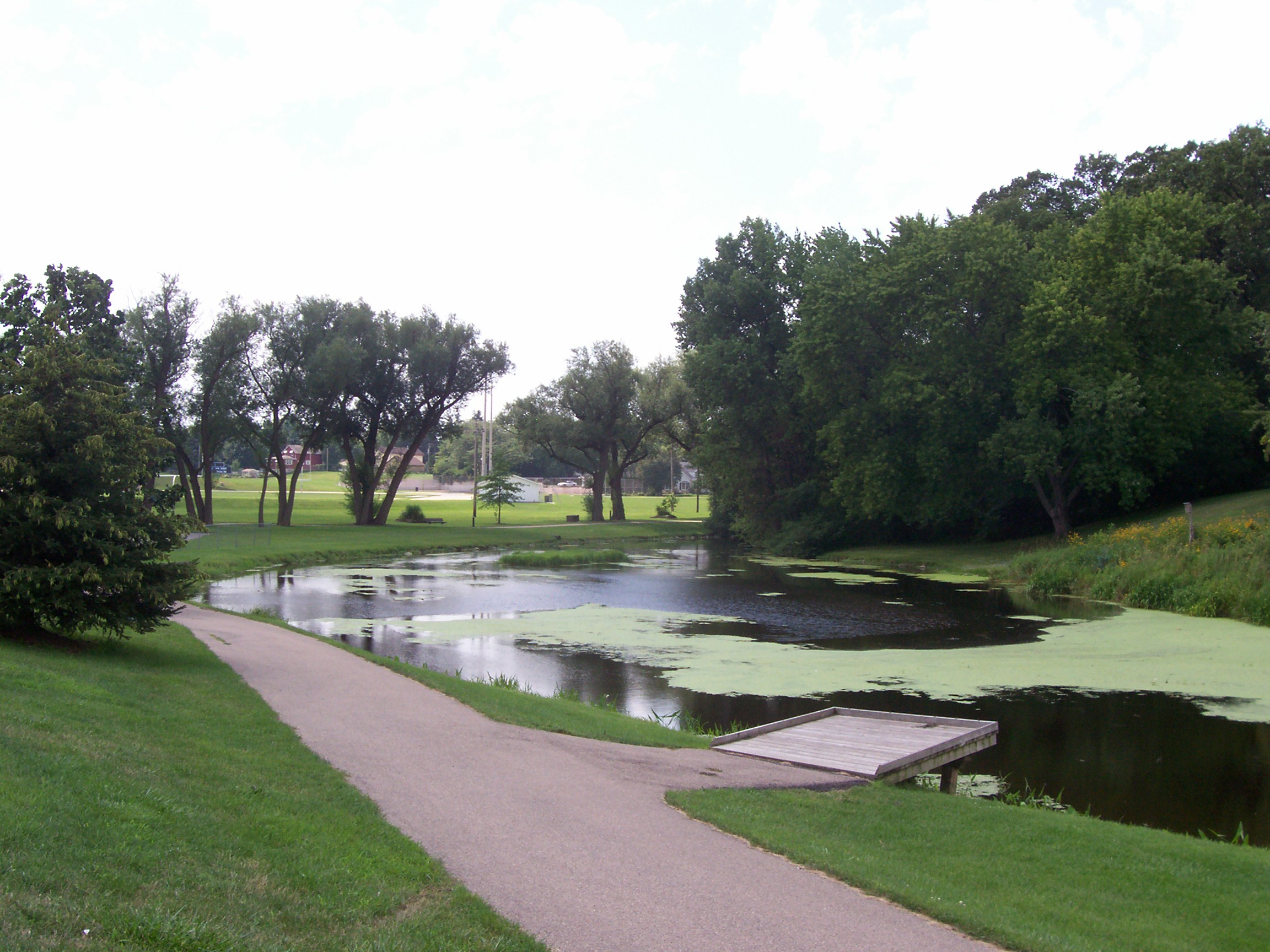
The South Branch of the Manitowoc River in Chilton, Wisconsin

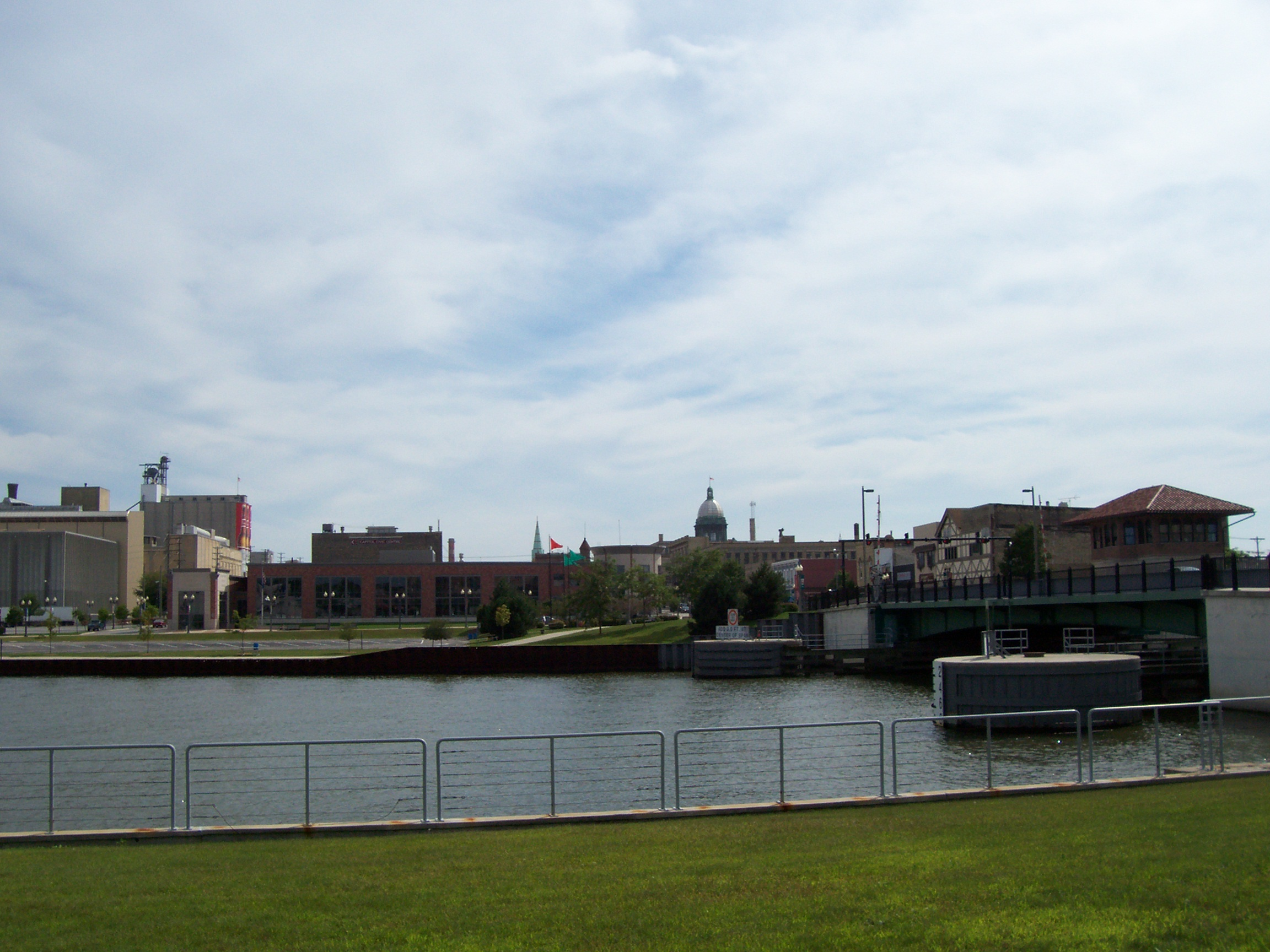
At the U.S. Route 10 bridge near its mouth into Lake Michigan in Manitowoc

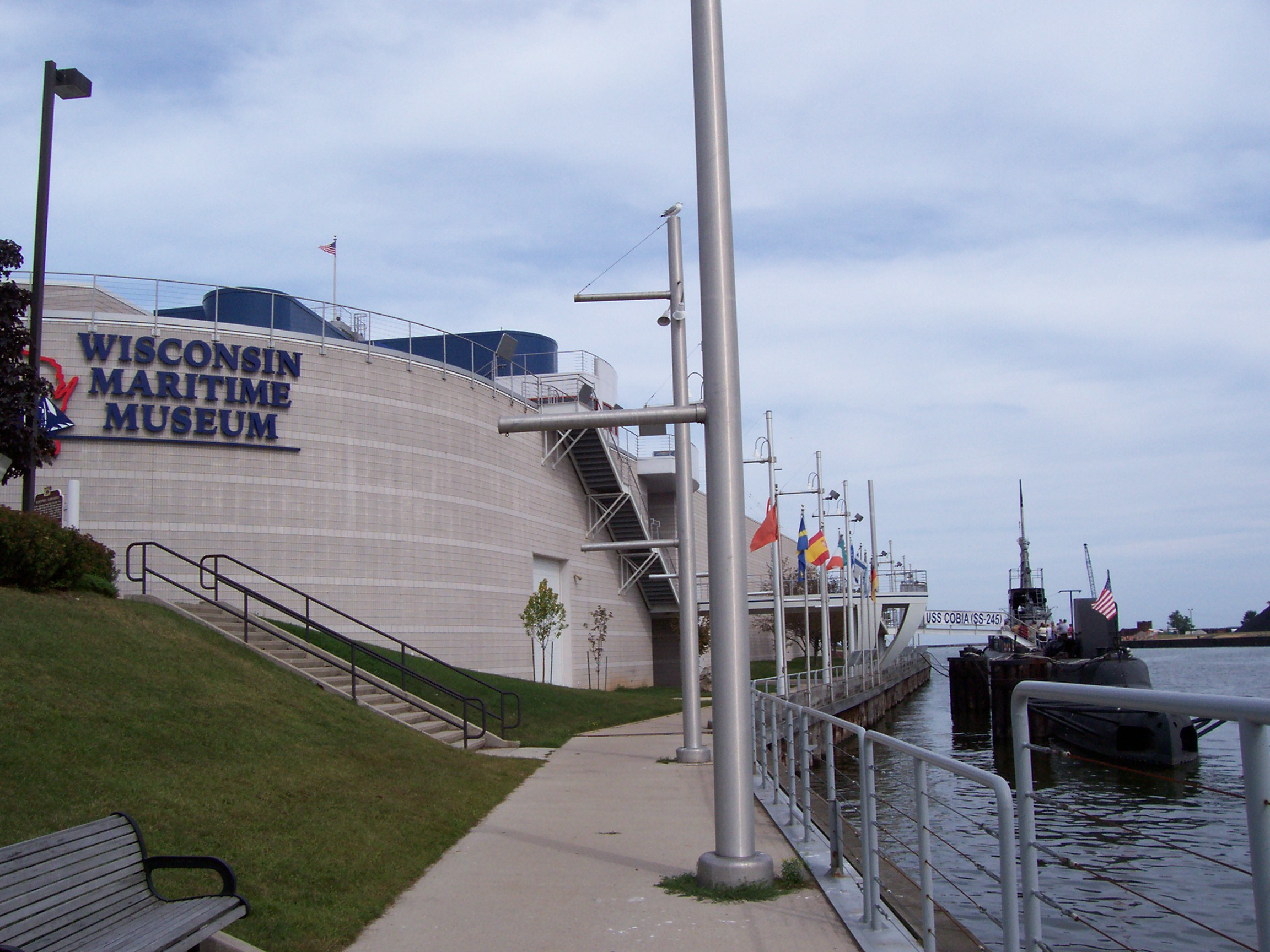
The mouth is visible surrounding the USS Cobia (right) at the Wisconsin Maritime Museum.

The Manitowoc River is a 35.8-mile-long (57.6 km) river in eastern Wisconsin in the United States. It flows into Lake Michigan at the city of Manitowoc.

== Course ==
The Manitowoc River is formed in eastern Calumet County by its north and south branches:

- The South Branch Manitowoc River, the longer of the two at 36.6 miles (58.9 km), rises in northeastern Fond du Lac County and flows generally northeastwardly into Calumet County, passing the city of Chilton and collecting the Killsnake River.
- The North Branch Manitowoc River rises in northern Calumet County and flows 22.2 miles (35.7 km) generally southeastwardly.

From the confluence of its forks, the Manitowoc flows generally eastwardly through central Manitowoc County to its mouth at Lake Michigan in the city of Manitowoc. Its largest tributary is the Branch River.

== Little Manitowoc River ==
The Little Manitowoc River is a 10.6-mile-long (17.1 km) stream that flows into Lake Michigan about 1 mi (2 km) north of the mouth of the Manitowoc River.

== See also ==
- List of rivers of Wisconsin

== Sources ==
- Columbia Gazetteer of North America entry
- DeLorme (1992). Wisconsin Atlas & Gazetteer. Freeport, Maine: DeLorme. ISBN 0-89933-247-1.
- U.S. Geological Survey Geographic Names Information System: Manitowoc River
- U.S. Geological Survey Geographic Names Information System: Little Manitowoc River
