= Nelson Lake (Wisconsin) =

Lake in the state of Wisconsin, United States

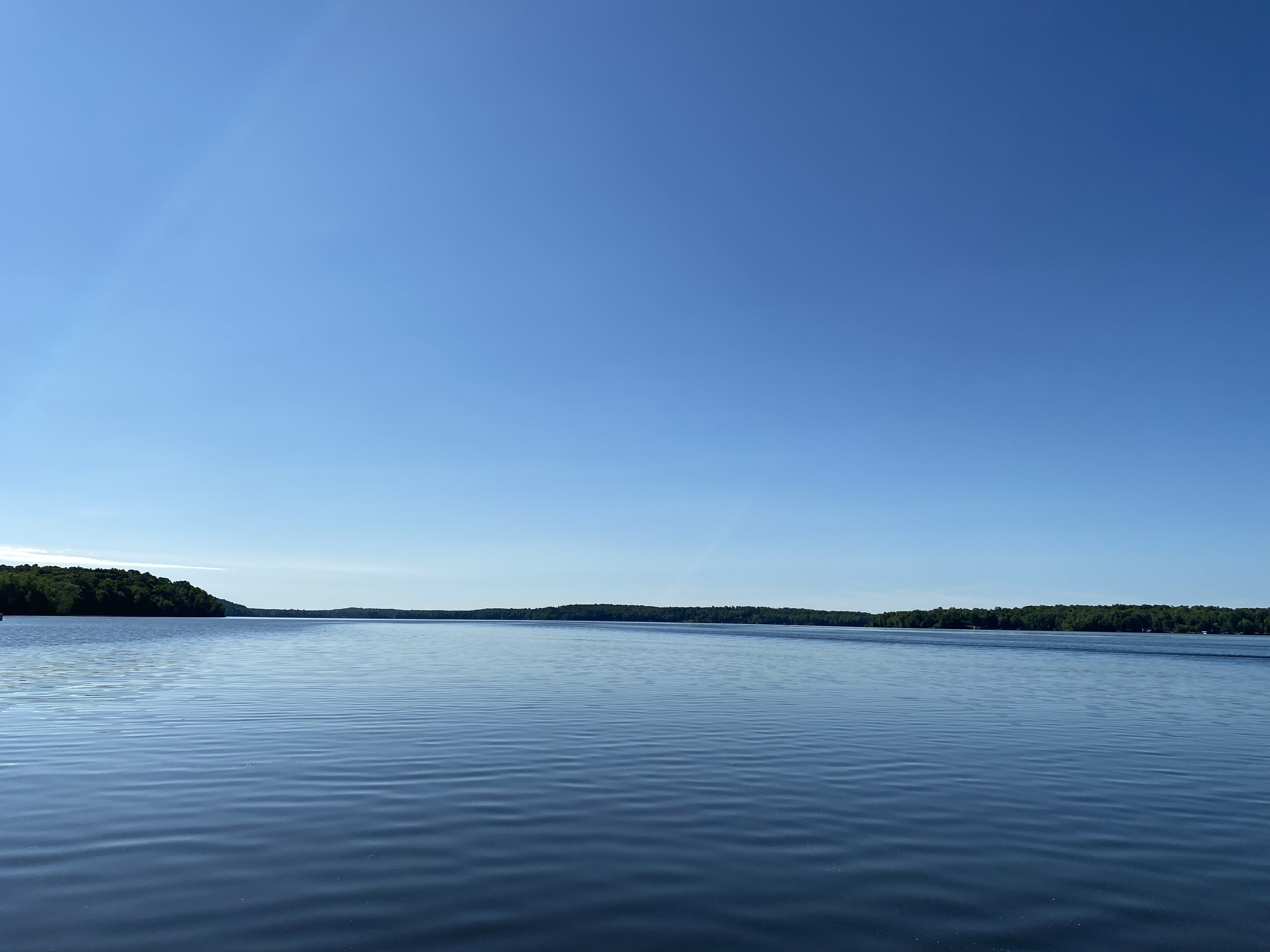

- Location within Wisconsin
- Location: Sawyer County, Wisconsin
- Coordinates: 46°05′11″N 91°29′39″W
- Type: reservoir
- Primary inflows: Totagatic River
- Primary outflows: Totagatic River
- Surface area: 2,716 acres (1,099 ha)
- Max. depth: 33 ft (10 m)
- Surface elevation: 1,253 ft (382 m)

Nelson Lake is a reservoir in Sawyer County, Wisconsin formed by a dam across the Totagatic River.

On January 9, 1934, a resolution was brought before the Sawyer County Board by Frank O. Nelson, a board member and a proponent for conservation, to "build a dam across the Totogatic River to create a large flowage or lake from the backwater, suitable for fish and which would furnish a refuge and breeding grounds for all kinds of wildlife." This was to be done with Civil Works Administration funds but this program ended in confusion. The Works Progress Administration followed and made a survey for this project. By October 1935, forty men from the Federal Transient Camp at Hayward were working at the dam.

Mr. Nelson died on November 15, 1935, before he could see the dam completed. After his death the County Board passed a resolution naming the flowage being formed at the big bend of the Totogatic, "Nelson Lake," in his memory, stating that: "this project was primarily proposed and started through the untiring efforts of the late F.O. Nelson."
