= Clam River (Wisconsin) =

Coordinates: 45°57′03″N 92°33′12″W

- Native name: Kayeskikan

Location
- Country: United States
- State: Wisconsin
- City: Clam Falls, WI

Physical characteristics
- Source: Numerous springs and wetlands
  - location: near Shell Lake, Wisconsin, Burnett County, WI
- Mouth: St. Croix River
  - location: near Clam Flowage, Danbury, WI

Basin features
- Tributaries
  - left: South Fork Clam River, Montgomery Creek, Indian Creek
  - right: Dody Brook

The Clam River is a 63.4-mile-long (102.0 km) tributary of the St. Croix River in northwestern Wisconsin in the United States. In its history, it has been known by the names Kayeskikan, Kiesca-seba, and "Shell River".

The North Fork of the Clam River begins as a small, intermittent stream in western Washburn County. It flows through wetlands west of Shell Lake, and rapidly enlarges in size as it is fed by a number of trout streams including Krantz Creek, the South Fork of the Clam River, Sand Creek, Spencer Creek, Indian Creek, Clam River Springs and Bass Lake Springs. The river widens noticeably after taking on Spencer Creek (Spencer Lake Springs). There are three operating dams on the river: one on the South Fork in the town of Clam Falls, another at Clam Dam County Park near Webster, and another immediately before the river joins the St. Croix. Beneath its confluence with the Clam, the St. Croix is regarded as one of Wisconsin's "big rivers".

== History ==
Evidence of human habitation in the vicinity of the Clam River dates back nearly 1,500 years. Several sites associated with Woodland Period culture can be found near the river, including burial mounds, sacred sites, and village sites (most of which are on private property). The burial mounds at Spencer and Clam Lakes have been dated to the end of the Middle Woodland Period, ca 500-700 AD.

Numerous other points of historical interest exist on or nearby the Clam River, including the old Arbuckle House and Logging Dam. This house served as a stopping place for travelers along the old Stillwater to La Pointe Mail Road. Several logging dams are also known to have existed along the river, demonstrating the river's significance as a channel of commerce during the logging era. In 1886, a dam on the Clam River was blown up by the hermit Robert Davidson, who claimed the dam interfered with his meadow lands. This was the start of a series of events that resulted in the two-mile 1886 St. Croix River log jam, one of the largest log jams to ever occur in the area. The release of the Clam River water caused the St. Croix River to rise slightly. Sluice dams on several other tributaries, including Kettle River and Snake River, were opened as well, and coincidentally, heavy rain storms caused the rivers to rise further. The log jam became over two miles long and the largest to ever occur in the area, reaching an estimated total of 125 to 150 million board feet of pine stuck in the log jam, including 15 million feet coming from the Clam River drive. Davidson was later charged for blowing up the dam and jailed for contempt of court.

== Recreation ==
The Clam River and some of its tributaries are listed as Class I trout streams, a category reserved by the Wisconsin DNR for "[h]igh quality trout waters that have sufficient natural reproduction to sustain populations of wild trout, at or near carry capacity." Most of the best trout fishing can be found on public land within 5 to 10 miles (8 to 16 km) of the headwaters. Several warmer water species can also be found in the river and the lakes and flowages it traverses. Typically, the river is navigable by canoe or kayak for most of its course, though parts of the river are prone to snags. The number of snags in the river increased greatly on July 1, 2011, when a windstorm yielding hurricane-force gusts caused extensive damage in the vicinity of the river. This storm knocked down thousands of acres of forest, and a significant number of trees fell directly into the river.

== Cities and towns ==
- Indian Creek, Wisconsin
- Clam Falls, Wisconsin

== See also ==
- 1886 St. Croix River log jam
- List of rivers of Wisconsin
- Mound builder (people)
- National Register of Historic Places listings in Wisconsin
