= Scuppernong River (Wisconsin) =

River in Wisconsin, United States of America

Scuppernong River Schupernong River, Scupernong River, Scuppernong Creek
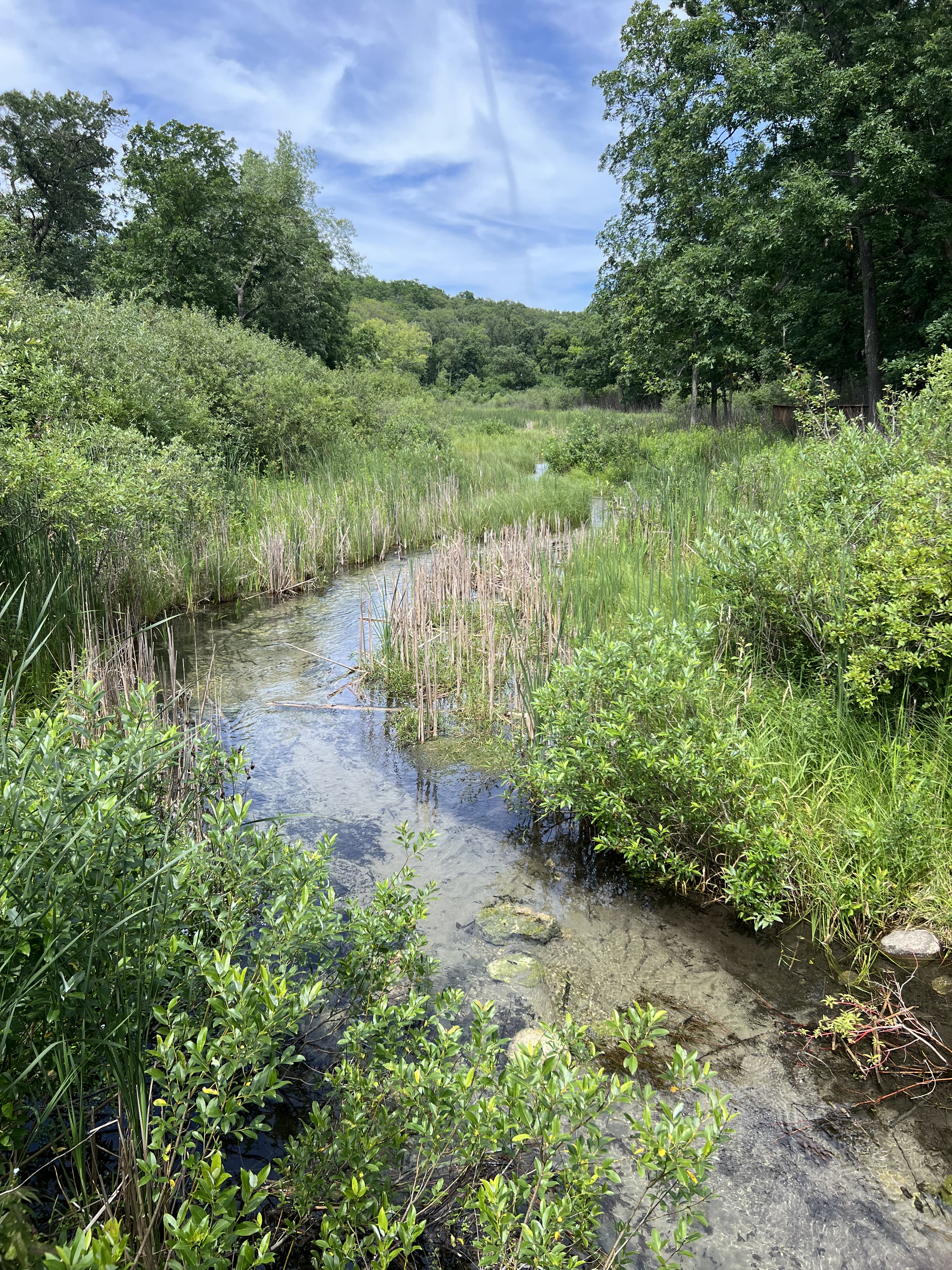
- Etymology: Ho-Chunk for "sweet-scented land"

Location
- Country: United States
- State: Wisconsin
- Counties: Waukesha, Jefferson

Physical characteristics
- Source: Scuppernong Springs, Kettle Moraine
  - location: Waukesha County
  - coordinates: 42.93251°N 88.46510°W
  - elevation: 844 feet (257 m)
- Mouth: Bark River
  - location: Jefferson County
  - coordinates: 42.89417°N 88.69733°W
  - elevation: 781 feet (238 m)
- Length: 18.9 miles (30.4 km)
- Basin size: 87.43 square miles (226.4 km^{2})

Basin features
- Progression: Bark → Rock → Mississippi → Gulf of Mexico
- River system: Mississippi
- Cities: Palmyra
- Tributaries
  - left: Spring Creek; Steel Brook
  - right: Mud Creek
- Waterbodies: Upper Spring Lake; Spring Lake
- Bridges: County Road Z; Wisconsin Highway 59; E Jefferson St; Wisconsin Highway 106

The Scuppernong River is a tributary of the Bark River, 18.9 miles (30.4 km) long, in southeastern Wisconsin in the United States. Via the Bark and Rock rivers, it is part of the watershed of the Mississippi River. It rises in southwestern Waukesha County and flows generally westwardly into Jefferson County, past the village of Palmyra. It joins the Bark River in Jefferson County, 4 miles (6 km) north of Whitewater.

The U.S. Board on Geographic Names settled on "Scuppernong River" as the stream's name in 1906. According to the Geographic Names Information System, it has also been known historically as "Schupernong River", "Scupernong River", and "Scuppernong Creek."

According to the Wisconsin Department of Natural Resources, the name Scuppernong comes from a Ho-Chunk word meaning “sweet-scented land.”

== See also ==
- List of Wisconsin rivers
