= Pine River (Florence County) =

River in the U.S. state of Wisconsin

Coordinates: 45°49′55″N 88°07′17″W

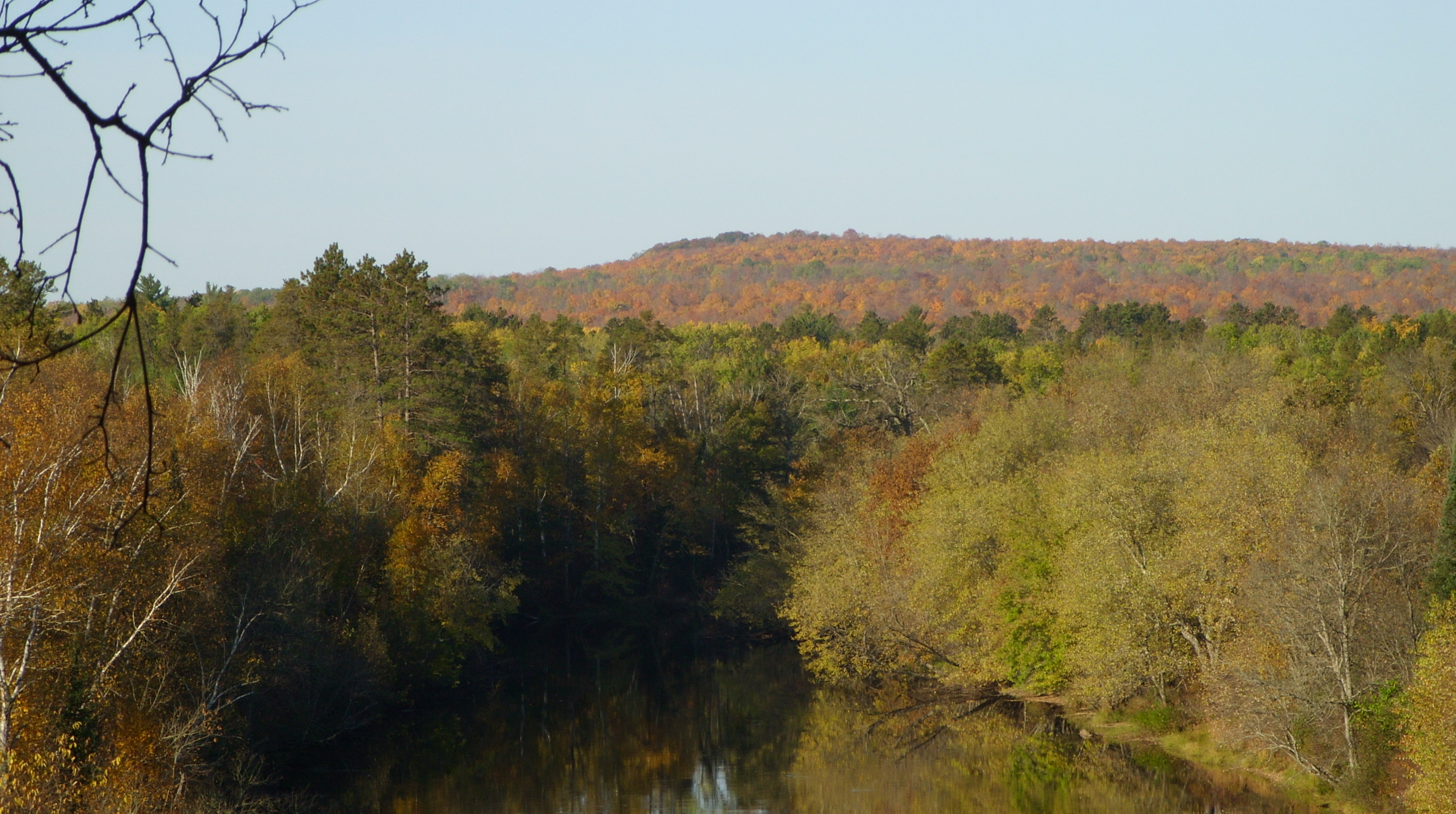
Pine River

Pine River is an 80.1-mile-long (128.9 km) river in the U.S. state of Wisconsin. It is a tributary of the Menominee River and flows through Forest and Florence counties.

The Pine River collects the Popple River below Wisconsin Highway 101. The Pine River has one dam just below La Salle Falls. It empties into the Menominee River a few miles northwest of Kingsford, Michigan.
