= New Wood River =

New Wood River Oskakirajaw Sebe (Ojibwe), Whaypaw River
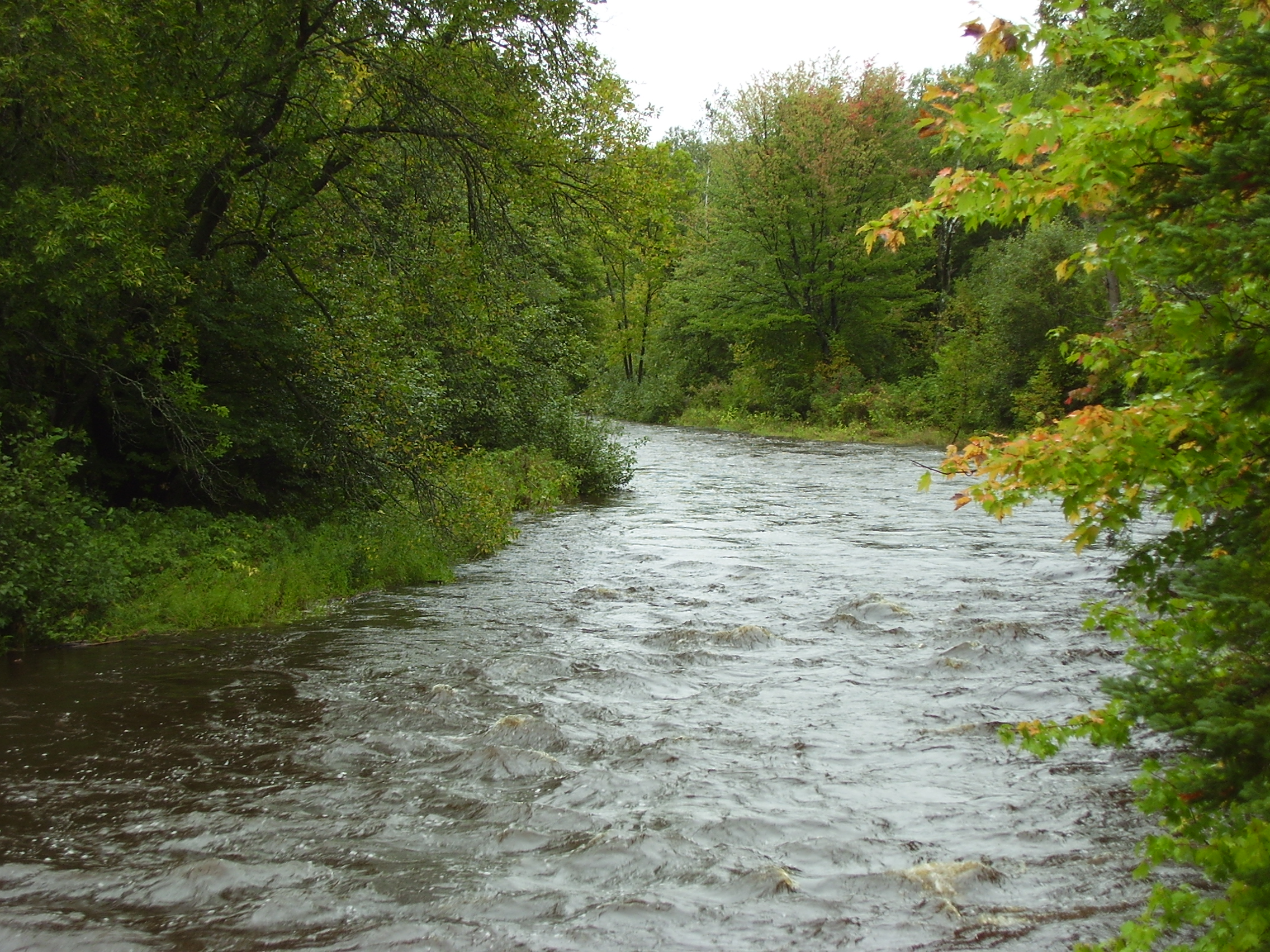
- New Wood River near one of the County Highway E bridges.

- Location within Wisconsin Location within the United States

Location
- Country: United States
- State: Wisconsin

Physical characteristics
- Source
  - location: Confluence of the East Fork and Center Fork
- Mouth
  - location: Wisconsin River

The New Wood River is the name of a tributary of the Wisconsin River in Lincoln County, Wisconsin. It is formed by the confluence of the East Fork and Center Fork at 45°20′26″N 89°57′39″W, and flows southeasterly, emptying into the Wisconsin just up stream from Lake Alexander. The Ojibwe called the river Oskakirajaw Sebe. The river flows through the New Wood Wildlife Area, a recreational area open to public hunting managed by the Wisconsin Department of Natural Resources.

== See also ==
- List of rivers in Wisconsin
