= Devils River (Wisconsin) =

Coordinates: 44°17′51″N 87°46′18″W

Location
- Country: United States

Physical characteristics
- Source
  - location: 6 miles (9.7 km) west of Denmark, Wisconsin
- Mouth
  - location: West Twin River at the north end of Richard J. Drumm Memorial Forest
  - elevation: 650 feet (200 m)
- Length: 15.8 mi (25.4 km)
- Basin size: 176 mi^{2} (460 km^{2})

Basin features
- Progression: East-southeast
- River system: West Twin River

The Devils River (also known archaically as the Manitoo River) is a small 15.8-mile-long (25.4 km) river in the state of Wisconsin in the United States. The Devils River flows primarily through Brown and Manitowoc counties and joins with the Neshota River to form the West Twin River. It is part of the 176-square-mile (460 km^{2}) West Twin River watershed.

The Ojibwe name for the river is Ma-na-to-kik-e-we-se-be, or "Stooping Spirit River." The root word Ma-na-to (or manitou) was often mistranslated as "devil" by early white settlers, which is why the river carries the name it does today.

== Geology and ecology of the river ==
The river flows through agricultural land that drops a gentle 22.7 feet (6.9 m) per 1 mile (1.6 km). However, the river does contains a series of three-ledge rapids near its mouth.

The upper 8 miles (13 km) of the river have lower water flow than the lower 4 miles (6.4 km), and suffer from degraded habitat. In the late summer and fall dry season, much of the upper two-thirds of the river dries out, leaving only unconnected pools. Only on the lower third is sport fishing allowed. Minnows are abundant throughout the river, and among those found in the Devils River are the western blacknose dace, common creek chub, common shiner, longnose dace, northern redbelly dace, redside dace, white sucker, and various species of darter. Sport fish such as black bullhead catfish and rock bass are native to the lower third. The Wisconsin Department of Natural Resources stocks brown trout, northern pike, and rainbow trout in the river, but over-winter survival rates are very low. The rusty crayfish, an invasive species, is now found in the Devils River.

The Devils River is part of the West Twin River watershed. The West Twin River watershed is itself one of seven watersheds contributing to the Twin-Door-Kewaunee River Basin, which empties into Lake Michigan.

== History of the area ==
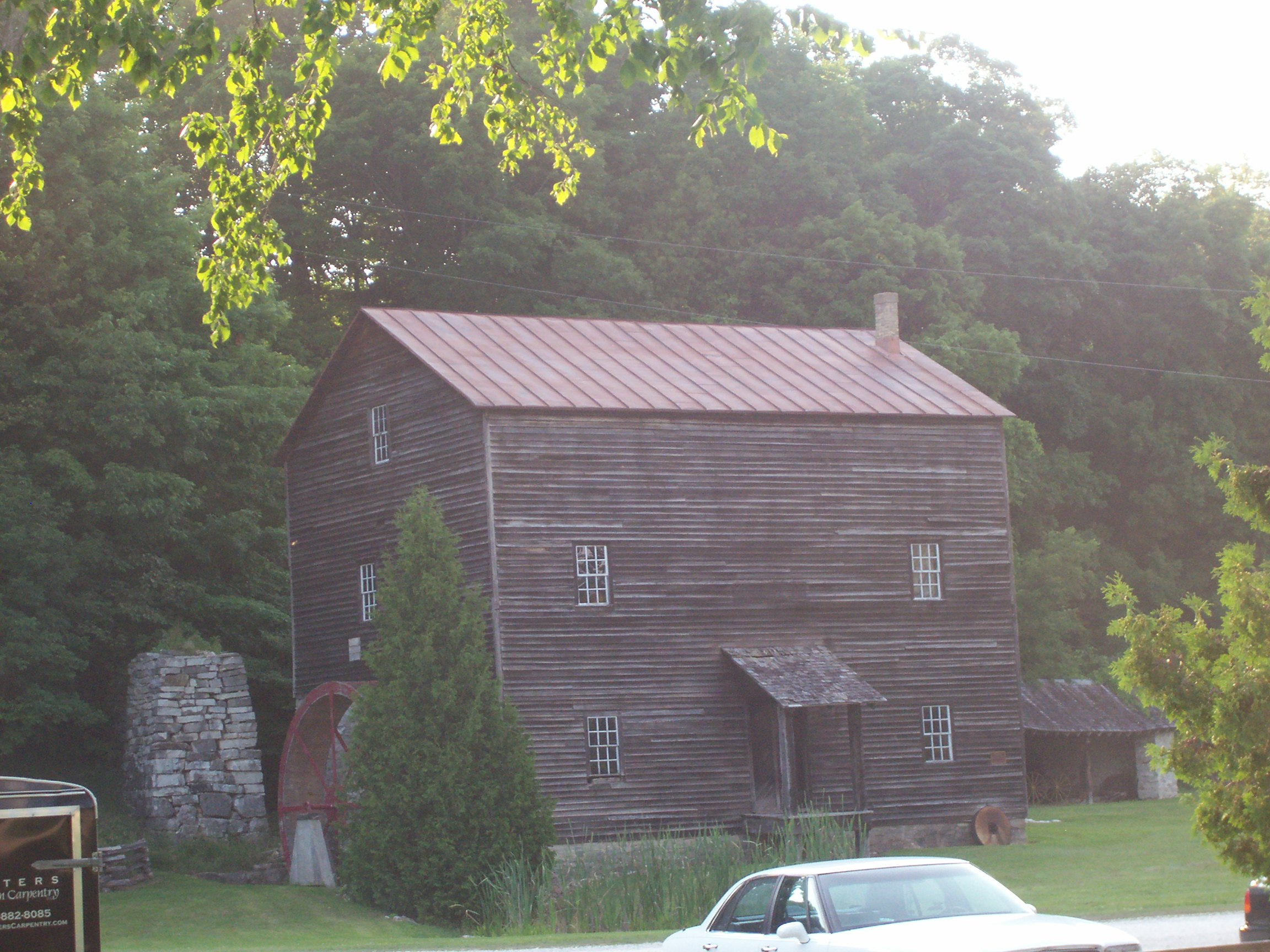
Rock Mill on Devils River.

A major Native American trail used to cross the Devils River near Cherney Maribel Caves County Park in Manitowoc County. White settlers later used the same trail to access and travel across the country. In 1840, U.S. Army Captain Thomas Jefferson Cram surveyed much of the area, and successfully proposed construction of a military road from Fort Dearborn (now the city of Chicago) to Fort Howard (now the city of Green Bay, Wisconsin).

In 1847, investor Pliney Pierce built Rock Mill on the Devils River, a site now listed on the National Register of Historic Places. It is one of the oldest structures in Manitowoc County.

In 2005, the Central Brown County Water Authority proposed removing the remaining stone abutments of two bridges which formerly comprised the old military road in order to build a 65-mile-long (105 km) water pipeline across the county. The Water Authority also proposed cutting a trench across the river in order to lay the pipeline beneath the riverbed. Tunneling and directional boring were ruled out as prohibitively expensive. The pipeline had to be built because water supplies needed by heavy residential development in the county were heavily depleted and highly contaminated. The Water Authority changed the route of the proposed pipeline to avoid destruction of the stone bridge abutments, and the pipeline was constructed in 2006. The $80 million pipeline opened in August 2007.

== Recreational activities on the Devils River ==
A state campground, the Devils River Campground, is located on the Devils River near Richard J. Drumm Memorial Forest.

A 14-mile (23 km) Devils River State Recreational Trail is being built alongside the river to provide recreational hiking and access to the river. The trail will take hikers near the Devils River Crossing, a noted ford where railroad trestle bridges tower 100 feet (30 m) above the river.

== Bibliography ==
- Calkins, Hiram. "Indian Nomenclature of Northern Wisconsin, With a Sketch of the Manners and Customs of the Chippewa." In First Annual Report of the State Historical Society of Wisconsin. Madison, Wisc.: Beriah Brown, 1855.
- Conzen, Michael P. Chicago Mapmakers: Essays on the Rise of the City's Map Trade. Chicago: Chicago Historical Society, 1984.
- Crawford, Bob. Walking Trails of Eastern and Central Wisconsin. Madison, Wisc.: University of Wisconsin Press, 1997.
- Davis, Varina. Jefferson Davis, Ex-President of the Confederate States of America. New York: Belford Company, 1890.
- Hoeft, Mike. "Authority Realigns Pipeline Route Near Devils River." Green Bay Press-Gazette. June 11, 2005.
- Hoeft, Mike. "Pipeline Runs Into History." Green Bay Press-Gazette. May 6, 2005.
- Lapham, Increase Allen. Wisconsin: Its Geography and Topography, History, Geology, and Mineralogy. New York: Paine & Burgess, 1846.
- Martin, Deborah Beaumont. History of Brown County, Wisconsin, Past and Present. Chicago: S.J. Clarke Pub. Co., 1913.
- Millard, Pete. "Brown County Cities Find Water Crisis Solution in Manitowoc County." Business Journal of Milwaukee. December 7, 2007.
- "Pipeline Work May Cause Traffic Headaches." Green Bay Press-Gazette. May 6, 2006.
- Shepard, Robin. Wisconsin's Best Breweries and Brewpubs: Searching for the Perfect Pint. Madison, Wisc.: University of Wisconsin Press, 2001.
- Vogel, Virgil J. Indian Names On Wisconsin's Map. Madison, Wisc.: University of Wisconsin Press, 1991.
- Evans, William L. "Military History of Green Bay." Proceedings of the State Historical Society of Wisconsin. Madison, Wisc.: Democrat Printing Co., 1900
- Wisconsin Department of Natural Resources. West Twin River Watershed. Madison, Wisc.: Wisconsin Department of Natural Resources, June 2010.
