= Peshtigo River =

River in Argonne, Wisconsin

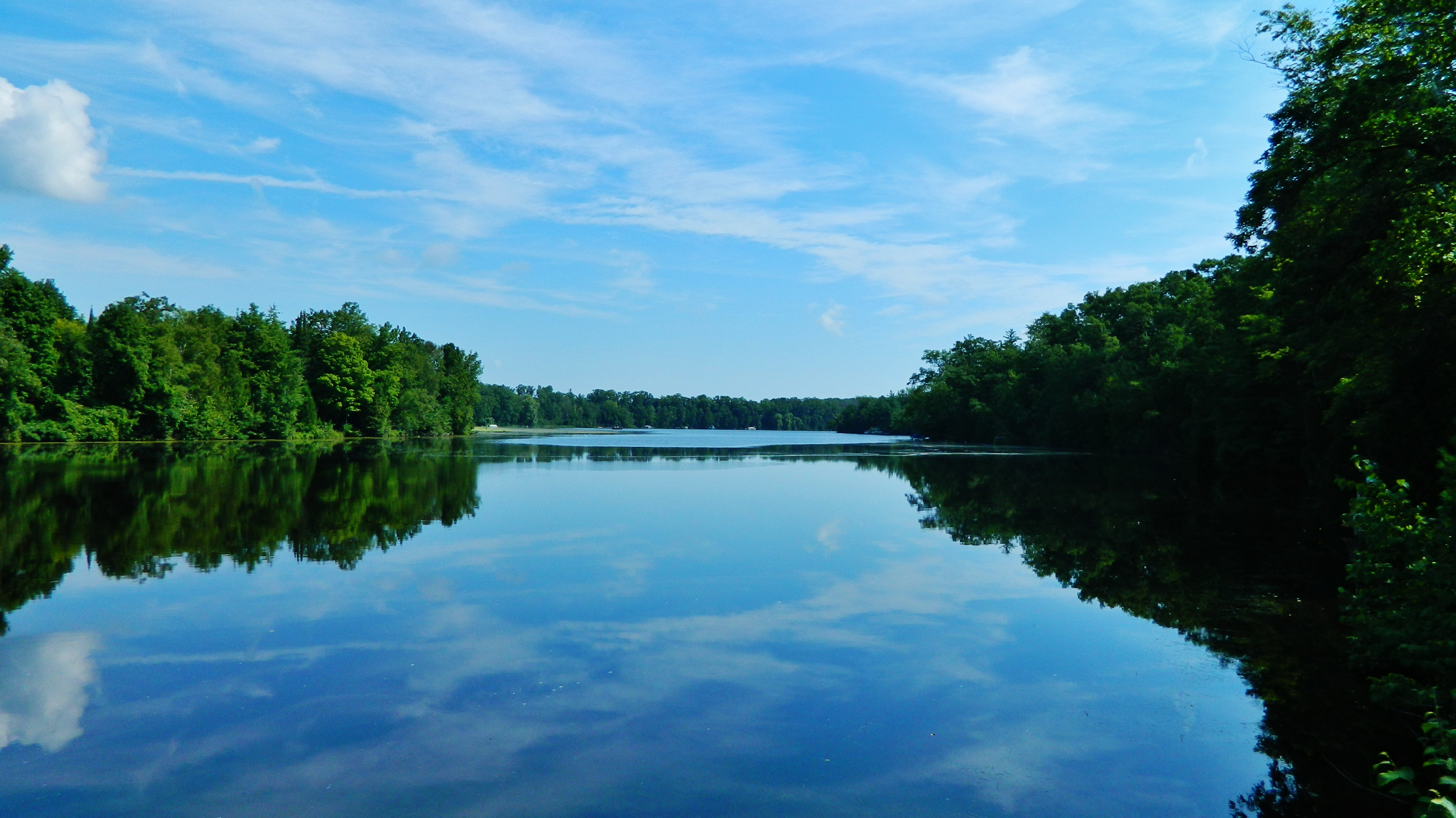
- The Peshtigo River in Stephenson

Physical characteristics
- Source
  - location: Argonne, Wisconsin
  - coordinates: 45°40′10″N 88°48′48″W
- Mouth
  - location: Green Bay (Lake Michigan) near Peshtigo, Wisconsin
  - coordinates: 44°58′25″N 87°39′20″W
  - elevation: 577 ft (176 m)
- Length: 136 mi (219 km)

The Peshtigo River (/ˈpɛʃtɪɡoʊ/ PESH-ti-go) is a 136-mile-long (219 km) tributary of Green Bay in the U.S. state of Wisconsin. The Peshtigo Fire happened in the river's vicinity, and some survivors used the river for refuge from the flames. A section of whitewater on the river called the Roaring Rapids is well known in the region. Further downstream there are two dams known as Caldron Falls Dam and High Falls Dam before collecting the Thunder River.

== Geography ==
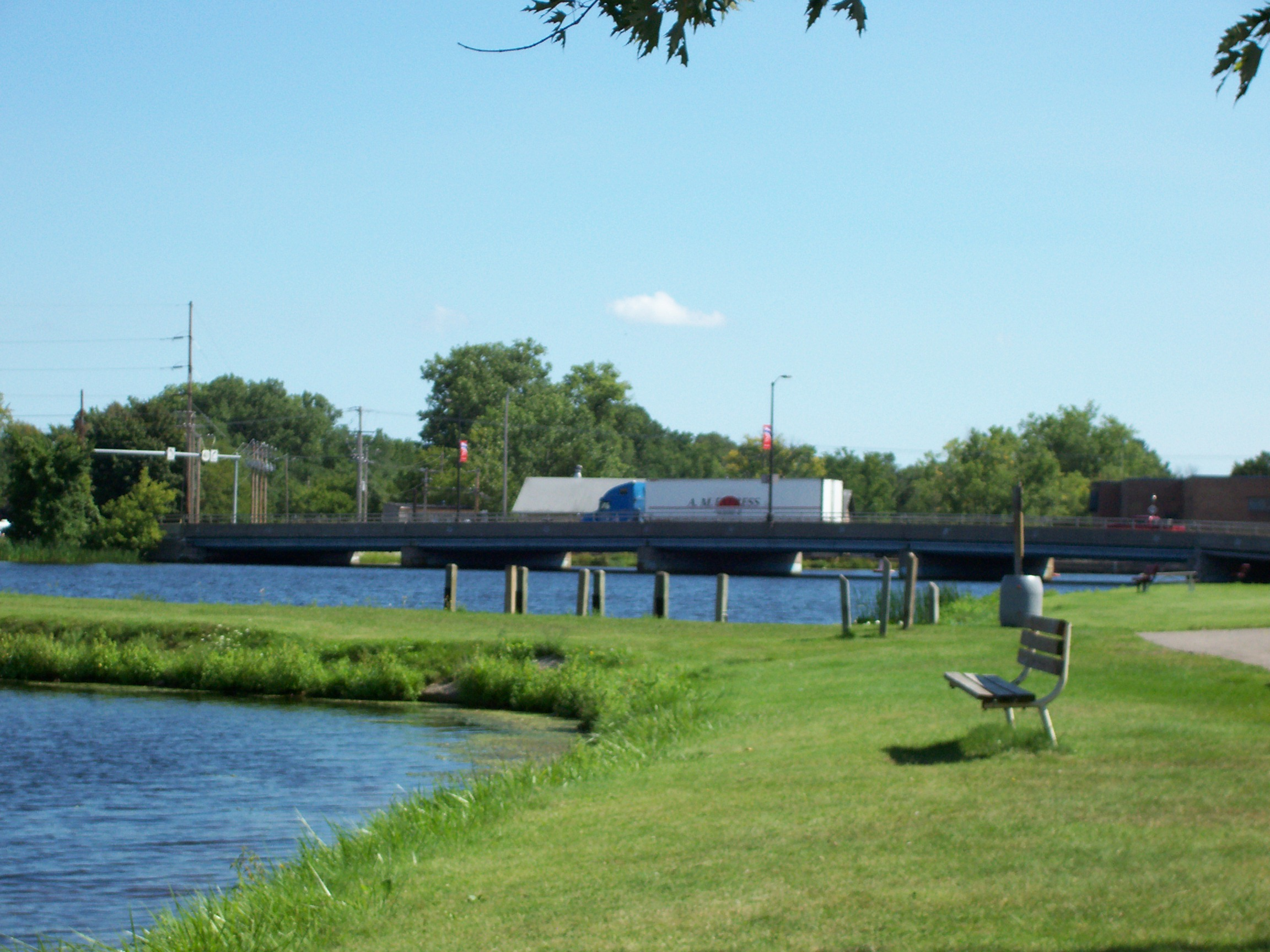
U.S. Route 41 bridge over the Peshtigo River in Peshtigo

The Peshtigo River is formed in Forest County and flows southeasterly towards the bay of Green Bay, spending most of its time winding through Marinette County.

== History ==
It shares its name with the city of Peshtigo, which was destroyed by the Peshtigo Fire on October 8, 1871. The fire was the deadliest fire in the history of the United States. According to stories of survivors, many people fled for the river to escape the inferno.

== See also ==
- List of Wisconsin rivers
