= Thunder River (Peshtigo River tributary) =

River in the U.S. state of Wisconsin

Coordinates: 45.26830°N 88.18538°W

Thunder River is a tributary of the Peshtigo River in Marinette County, Wisconsin.

The Thunder River originates in northern Oconto County near Thunder Mountain and travels downslope into Marinette County past a waterfall known as Veteran Falls to the Peshtigo River.
