= Wind River (Wisconsin) =

- Location of the mouth of Wind River in Wisconsin

Location
- Country: United States
- State: Wisconsin
- County: Pierce

Physical characteristics
- Source: Trimbelle
  - coordinates: 44°42′04″N 092°37′11″W
  - elevation: 1,064 ft (324 m)
- Mouth: Mississippi River
  - location: Diamond Bluff
  - coordinates: 44°39′13″N 092°38′34″W
  - elevation: 676 ft (206 m)
- Length: 9 mi (14 km)

The Wind River is a minor tributary of the Mississippi River in western Wisconsin in the United States. It flows for its entire 9.0-mile (14.5 km) length in western Pierce County. It rises in the town (unincorporated jurisdiction) of Trimbelle and flows southward through the towns of Oak Grove and Diamond Bluff. Wind River joins the Mississippi near the unincorporated community of Diamond Bluff, which is within the larger jurisdiction (the town). The confluence is 801 miles (1,289 km) from the Mississippi's mouth on the Gulf of Mexico.

== See also ==
- List of Wisconsin rivers
