= South Fork of the Kinnickinnic River =

Coordinates: 44°51′17″N 92°38′04″W

Kinnickinnic River

Location
- Country: United States
- State: Wisconsin
- Region: River Falls

Physical characteristics
- Length: 7.1 mi (11.4 km)

The South Fork of the Kinnickinnic River is a 7.1 mile-long tributary to the Kinnickinnic River in northwestern Wisconsin, USA.

== Location ==
The South Fork of the Kinnickinnic River is located 0.7 miles from the city of River Falls, Wisconsin. The river begins east of the city, meanders through farmland and residential areas, then connects to the Kinnickinnic River. The South Fork is one of several smaller rivers and creeks that connect with the Kinnickinnic River to drain the 170 square mile Kinnickinnic watershed.

== Recreation ==
The main recreational use of the river is for trout fly fishing. The river is classified by the Wisconsin DNR as a class II trout stream. Due to the high quantity and concentration of fish in the river it is heralded as a "jewel of a trout stream" by anglers who fish its waters. The river is primarily home to brook trout as opposed to the main Kinnickinnic River which contains high numbers of brown trout. The brook trout densities for the river are described as moderate.

Another source of recreation on the South Fork is birdwatching. A few of the major species in this area include mourning warbler, grasshopper sparrow, eastern bluebird, eastern kingbird, and Canada geese. Along with fly fishing and bird watching, kayaking is another recreational activity to participate in on the river.
