= Sugar River (Pecatonica River tributary) =

River in Wisconsin, United States

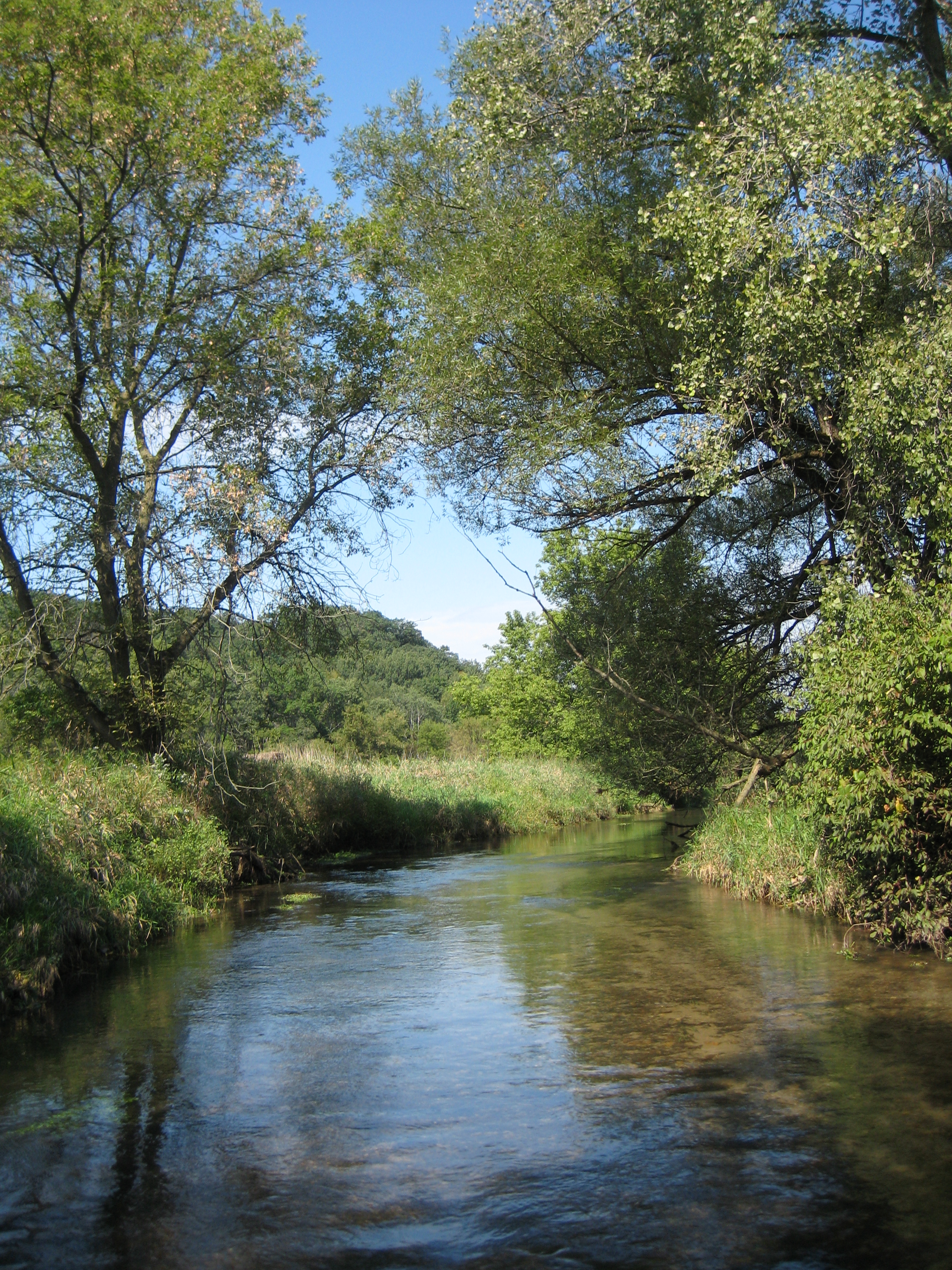

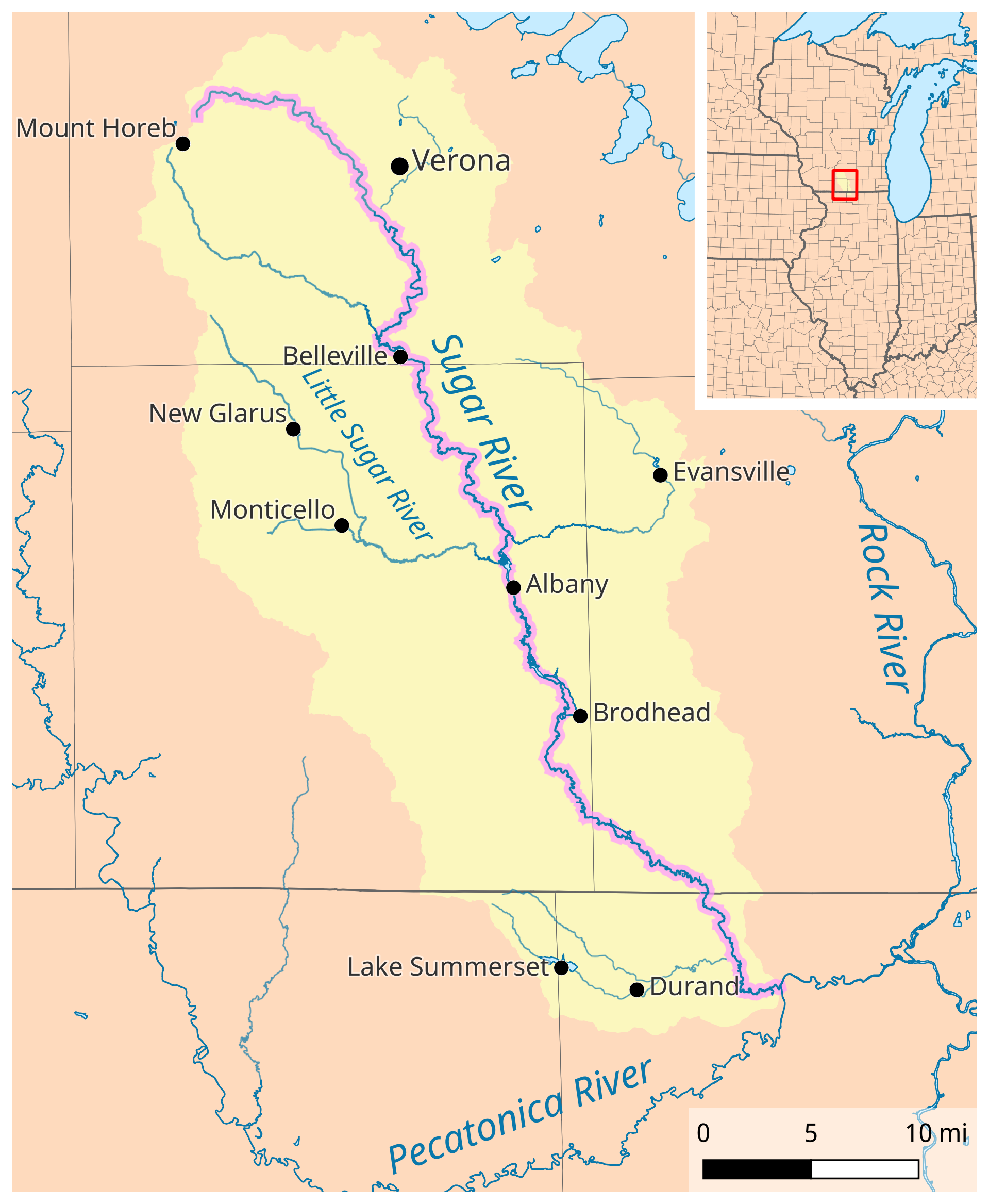
- Sugar River watershed map

Physical characteristics
- Source
  - location: Dane County north of Mount Horeb, Wisconsin
  - coordinates: 43°01′22″N 89°43′22″W
  - elevation: 1,164 ft (355 m)
- Mouth
  - location: Confluence with the Pecatonica south of Shirland, Illinois
  - coordinates: 42°26′08″N 89°11′50″W
  - elevation: 718 ft (219 m)
- Length: 91 mi (146 km)

Basin features
- Progression: Sugar River → Pecatonica → Rock → Mississippi → Gulf of Mexico
- GNIS ID: 1575030

The Sugar River is a tributary of the Pecatonica River, approximately 91 miles (146 km) long, in the U.S. states of Wisconsin and Illinois.

It river rises in the hills of southwest Wisconsin, in southwest Dane County, approximately 15 miles (24 km) southwest of Madison.

== See also ==
- List of rivers of Illinois
- List of rivers of Wisconsin
