= East Twin River (Wisconsin) =

River in Wisconsin, United States

Coordinates: 44°08′42″N 87°33′46″W

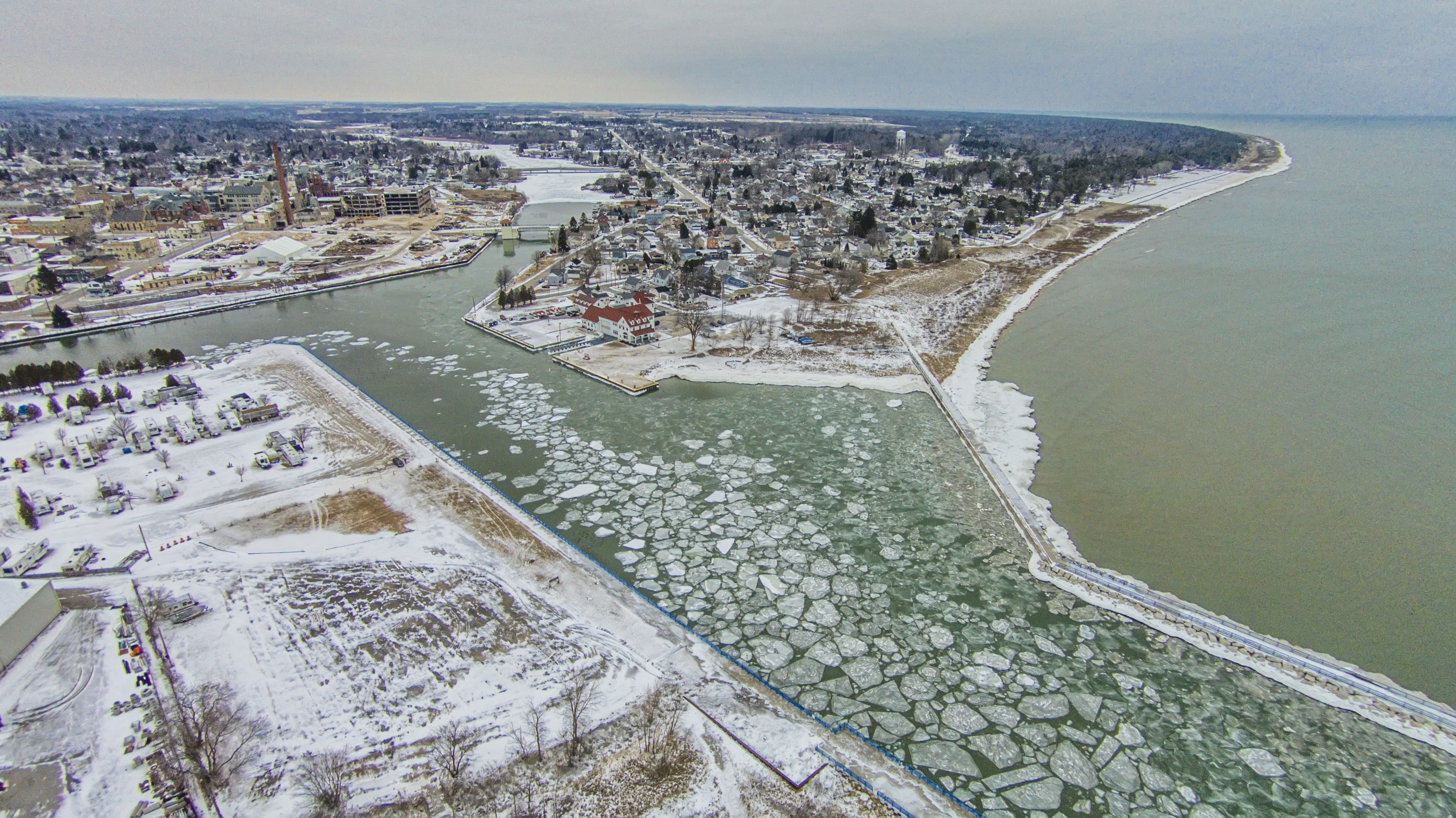
The East Twin and West Twin rivers meet at the Two Rivers harbor before journeying into Lake Michigan.

The East Twin River, formerly the Mishicot River, is a 41.1-mile-long (66.1 km) river in east-central Wisconsin that is a tributary to Lake Michigan. It merges with the West Twin River in the city of Two Rivers at its mouth with the lake. The source of the river is located in central Kewaunee County. On its course it passes through the villages of Mishicot and Tisch Mills. Its tributaries include Jambo Creek and Tisch Mills Creek.

Although the East Twin River is considered an impaired stream for phosphorus levels, a report in 2018 concluded that the "overall fish community in the Upper East Twin River watershed is in good to excellent condition." Fish surveys have found up to 20 species at a time.
