= Ethan Allen School for Boys =

Coordinates: 43°01′28″N 88°23′23″W

- Statesan Historic District
- U.S. National Register of Historic Places
- U.S. Historic district
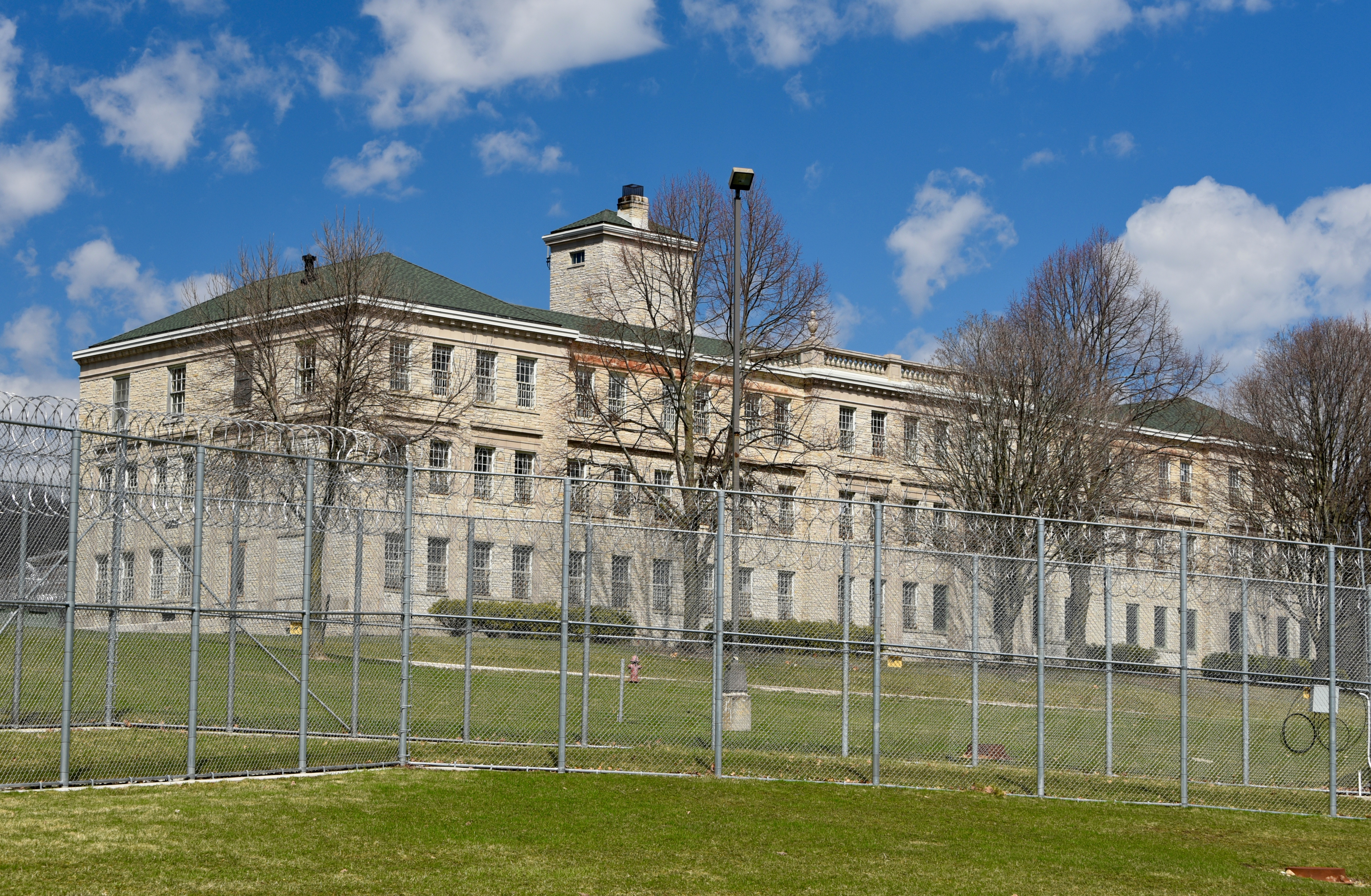

- Location within Wisconsin Location within the United States
- Location: Boys School Road, Delafield Town (Wales address)
- Built: 1907
- Architectural style: Craftsman
- NRHP reference No.: 88000454
- Added to NRHP: April 21, 1988

Ethan Allen School for Boys was a reform school in Delafield Town, Wisconsin (although the mailing address stated Wales, Wisconsin) which operated in a former tuberculosis sanitorium from April 1959 until June 2011, when it was abolished and the inmates moved to Lincoln Hills School in Irma. It was operated by the Wisconsin Department of Corrections.

The school campus was listed on the National Register of Historic Places in 1988 as the Statesan Historic District, notable for being the first state-sponsored tuberculosis sanitorium in Wisconsin, and the largest.

== History ==
In 1905 the Wisconsin legislature approved building a sanitorium to treat pulmonary tuberculosis. The state purchased 200 acres on the south side of Government Hill, a sunny site with fresh air, and protection from north and east winds. By 1907 the Wisconsin State Sanitarium Hospital (Statesan) admitted its first 40 patients. An administration building had been built, a dining hall, a power plant, and several cottages for patients. The health of a patient determined the cottage, so as a patient improved, he/she moved to more healthy cottages.

The initial complex in 1907 consisted of a 1.5-story Craftsman-styled dining hall, with a corner pavilion with large windows, the laundry building, the 2.5-story administration building, and men's and women's cottages - long hip-roofed buildings with full-length porches on their south sides so patients could enjoy the sun and fresh air. Most of these buildings had walls of hollow clay tile, clad in stucco.

The facility immediately filled up, so the next year the state added two more patient cottages. There were 87 patients in 1910, 175 by 1912. More cottages were added, and tents. In 1913 an assembly hall/chapel was added, two stories in a style similar to the other buildings. In 1918 an infirmary was added.

By 1929 the thinking on treating tuberculosis was changing. The previous approach had been largely passive: good food, good rest, and fresh air. By this time, surgical treatments were known, including pumping air between the lung and chest cavity to partially collapse the lung, and removing ribs to reduce lung activity. Coinciding with these new ideas, the facility built a large three-story 105-bed hospital. No longer needed, the cottages were probably torn down at this time.

The Statesan facility was the first in the state, but other state TB sanitariums soon followed. Lake Tomahawk Camp opened in Oneida County in 1915, as a destination for male patients who had completed treatment at Statesan. Other smaller county sanatoria began to open starting in 1913.

Antibiotics like streptomycin were a powerful treatment for TB, reducing average length of stay at Statesan and increasing vacancies. By 1957 occupancy was about 50% and the state legislature decided to close the facility.

In 1959 it reopened as a state reformatory for delinquent boys, the Ethan Allen School for Boys.
