= Tomahawk (town), Wisconsin =

Tomahawk, Wisconsin
- Town
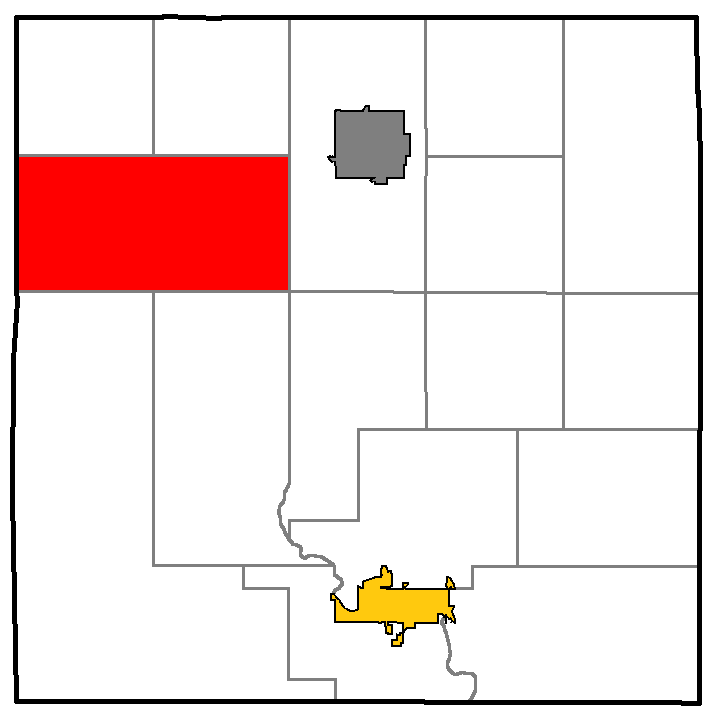
- Location of Tomahawk, within Lincoln County
- Coordinates: 45°26′23″N 89°55′2″W
- Country: United States
- State: Wisconsin
- County: Lincoln

Area
  - Total: 71 sq mi (185 km^{2})
  - Land: 69.7 sq mi (180.6 km^{2})
  - Water: 1.7 sq mi (4.4 km^{2})
- Elevation: 1,512 ft (461 m)

Population (2020)
  - Total: 458
  - Density: 6.57/sq mi (2.54/km^{2})
- Time zone: UTC-6 (Central (CST))
  - Summer (DST): UTC-5 (CDT)
- ZIP Codes: 54487 (Tomahawk); 54564 (Tripoli)
- Area codes: 715 & 534
- FIPS code: 55-80150
- GNIS feature ID: 1584285

Tomahawk is a town in Lincoln County, Wisconsin, United States. The population was 458 at the 2020 census. The city of Tomahawk is located to the northeast of the town, but is not contiguous with it. The unincorporated community of Spirit Falls is located in the town.

== Geography ==
Tomahawk is in the western part of Lincoln County, bordered to the west by Price County. The eastern border of the town is 2 miles (3 km) west of the city of Tomahawk's western limits. Wisconsin Highway 86 runs east–west across the northern part of the town, leading east to Tomahawk city and west to Ogema in Price County.

According to the United States Census Bureau, the town of Tomahawk has a total area of 71 square miles (185 km^{2}), of which 69.7 square miles (180.6 km^{2}) are land and 1.7 square miles (4.4 km^{2}), or 2.37%, are water. The Spirit River crosses the northern part of the town from west to east, draining most of the town. The southwestern part of town is drained by tributaries of the New Wood River. Both the Spirit and the New Wood are tributaries of the Wisconsin River.

== Demographics ==
As of the census of 2000, there were 439 people, 192 households, and 125 families residing in the town. The population density was 6.3 people per square mile (2.4/km^{2}). There were 383 housing units at an average density of 5.5 per square mile (2.1/km^{2}). The racial makeup of the town was 98.86% White, 0.23% Asian, and 0.91% from two or more races. 0.46% of the population were Hispanic or Latino of any race.

There were 192 households, out of which 22.4% had children under the age of 18 living with them, 56.8% were married couples living together, 5.2% had a female householder with no husband present, and 34.4% were non-families. 27.6% of all households were made up of individuals, and 9.4% had someone living alone who was 65 years of age or older. The average household size was 2.29 and the average family size was 2.79.

In the town, the population was spread out, with 20% under the age of 18, 6.6% from 18 to 24, 26.7% from 25 to 44, 32.6% from 45 to 64, and 14.1% who were 65 years of age or older. The median age was 44 years. For every 100 females, there were 102.3 males. For every 100 females age 18 and over, there were 97.2 males.

The median income for a household in the town was $35,625, and the median income for a family was $41,964. Males had a median income of $37,500 versus $18,125 for females. The per capita income for the town was $16,681. About 6.7% of families and 8.6% of the population were below the poverty line, including none of those under age 18 and 11.5% of those age 65 or over.
