= Russell, Lincoln County, Wisconsin =

Russell, Wisconsin
- Town
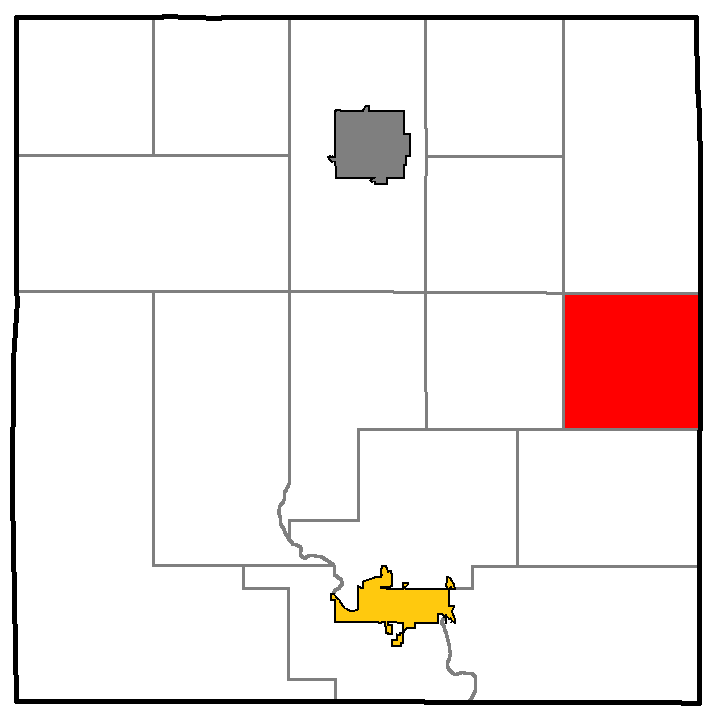
- Location of Russell, within Lincoln County

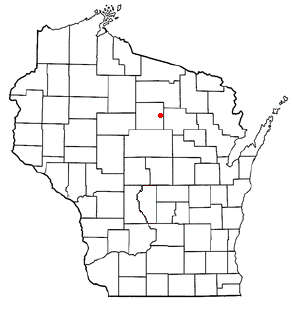
- Location of Russell, Wisconsin
- Coordinates: 45°19′45″N 89°28′41″W
- Country: United States
- State: Wisconsin
- County: Lincoln

Area
  - Total: 36.31 sq mi (94.03 km^{2})
  - Land: 35.76 sq mi (92.63 km^{2})
  - Water: 0.54 sq mi (1.40 km^{2})
- Elevation: 1,512 ft (461 m)

Population (2025)
  - Total: 704
  - Density: 19.7/sq mi (7.60/km^{2})
- Time zone: UTC-6 (Central (CST))
  - Summer (DST): UTC-5 (CDT)
- ZIP Code: 54435 (Gleason)
- Area codes: 715 & 534
- FIPS code: 55-069-70325
- GNIS feature ID: 1584081
- Website: townofrussellwi.com

Russell is a town in Lincoln County, Wisconsin, United States. The population was 704 in 2025. The unincorporated communities of Gleason and Dudley are located in the town. The unincorporated community of Bloomville is also located partially in the town.

== Geography ==
Russell is on the eastern side of Lincoln County and is bordered to the east by Langlade County. Wisconsin Highway 17 crosses the town, passing through Bloomville, Gleason, and Dudley. The highway leads north 26 miles (42 km) to Rhinelander and southwest 14 miles (23 km) to Merrill, the Lincoln county seat.

According to the United States Census Bureau, the town of Russell has a total area of 36.3 square miles (94.0 km^{2}), of which 35.8 square miles (92.6 km^{2}) are land and 0.5 square miles (1.4 km^{2}), or 1.48%, are water. The town is drained by the Prairie River, a southwestward-flowing tributary of the Wisconsin River.

== Demographics ==
As of the census of 2000, there were 693 people, 271 households, and 194 families residing in the town. The population density was 19.2 people per square mile (7.4/km^{2}). There were 330 housing units at an average density of 9.1 per square mile (3.5/km^{2}). The racial makeup of the town was 98.27% White, 0.14% African American, 0.72% from other races, and 0.87% from two or more races. Hispanic or Latino people of any race were 0.87% of the population.

There were 271 households, out of which 33.2% had children under the age of 18 living with them, 59% were married couples living together, 7.7% had a female householder with no husband present, and 28.4% were non-families. 23.6% of all households were made up of individuals, and 10% had someone living alone who was 65 years of age or older. The average household size was 2.56 and the average family size was 2.99.

In the town, the population was spread out, with 27.4% under the age of 18, 5.8% from 18 to 24, 29.7% from 25 to 44, 26.4% from 45 to 64, and 10.7% who were 65 years of age or older. The median age was 38 years. For every 100 females, there were 106.3 males. For every 100 females age 18 and over, there were 104.5 males.

The median income for a household in the town was $42,500, and the median income for a family was $45,536. Males had a median income of $30,476 versus $25,000 for females. The per capita income for the town was $17,875. None of the families and 3.1% of the population were living below the poverty line, including no under eighteens and 6.7% of those over 64.
