= Rock Falls, Wisconsin =

- Town
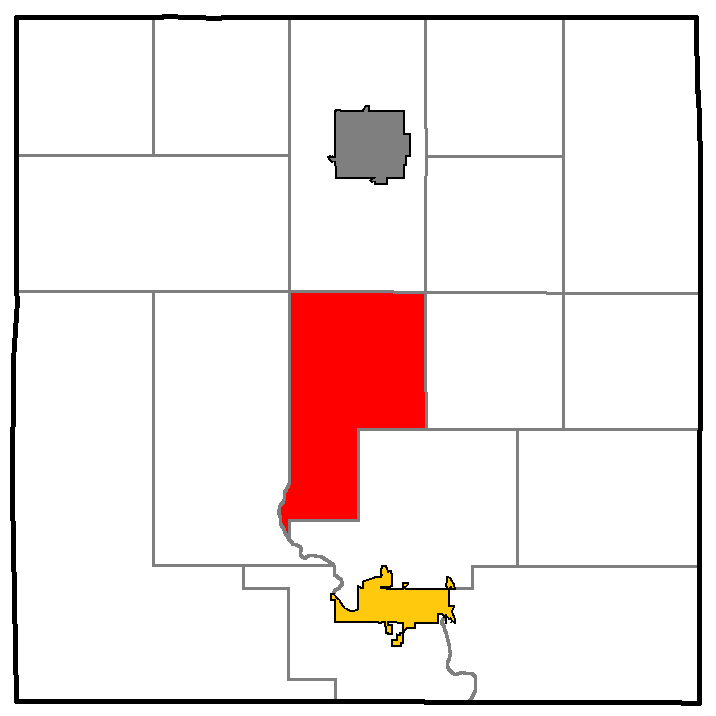
- Location of Rock Falls, within Lincoln County

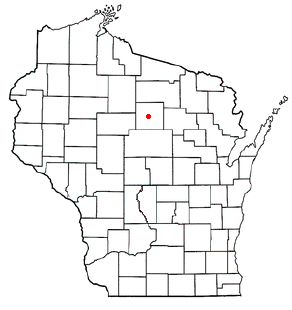
- Location of Rock Falls, Wisconsin
- Coordinates: 45°19′05″N 89°44′35″W
- Country: United States
- State: Wisconsin
- County: Lincoln

Area
  - Total: 49.2 sq mi (127.3 km^{2})
  - Land: 47.7 sq mi (123.5 km^{2})
  - Water: 1.5 sq mi (3.8 km^{2})
- Elevation: 1,562 ft (476 m)

Population (2020)
  - Total: 635
  - Density: 13.3/sq mi (5.14/km^{2})
- Time zone: UTC-6 (Central (CST))
  - Summer (DST): UTC-5 (CDT)
- ZIP Codes: 54442 (Irma); 54452 (Merrill); 54487 (Tomahawk)
- Area codes: 715 & 534
- FIPS code: 55-68825
- GNIS feature ID: 1584054
- Website: https://townofrockfalls.com/

Rock Falls is a town in Lincoln County, Wisconsin, United States. The population was 635 at the 2020 census.

== Geography ==
Rock Falls is in central Lincoln County, 11 miles (18 km) north of Merrill, the county seat, and 12 miles (19 km) south of Tomahawk. U.S. Route 51 crosses part of the eastern side of the town, and Wisconsin Highway 107 crosses the entire town from south to north, running up the east side of the Wisconsin River.

According to the United States Census Bureau, the town has a total area of 49.2 square miles (127.3 km^{2}), of which 47.7 square miles (123.5 km^{2}) are land and 1.5 square miles (3.8 km^{2}), or 3.01%, are water.

== Demographics ==
As of the census of 2000, there were 598 people, 231 households, and 176 families residing in the town. The population density was 12.5 people per square mile (4.8/km^{2}). There were 415 housing units at an average density of 8.7 per square mile (3.4/km^{2}). The racial makeup of the town was 98.49% White, 0.33% Native American, 0.17% Asian, 0.17% from other races, and 0.84% from two or more races. Hispanic or Latino people of any race were 0.84% of the population.

There were 231 households, out of which 27.7% had children under the age of 18 living with them, 71% were married couples living together, 3% had a female householder with no husband present, and 23.4% were non-families. 18.6% of all households were made up of individuals, and 4.8% had someone living alone who was 65 years of age or older. The average household size was 2.59 and the average family size was 2.96.

In the town, the population was spread out, with 22.7% under the age of 18, 6.4% from 18 to 24, 27.9% from 25 to 44, 30.4% from 45 to 64, and 12.5% who were 65 years of age or older. The median age was 42 years. For every 100 females, there were 97.4 males. For every 100 females age 18 and over, there were 105.3 males.

The median income for a household in the town was $46,875, and the median income for a family was $51,042. Males had a median income of $31,719 versus $20,893 for females. The per capita income for the town was $18,865. About 2.9% of families and 2.6% of the population were below the poverty line, including none of those under age 18 and 6.9% of those age 65 or over.
