= Schley, Wisconsin =

- Town
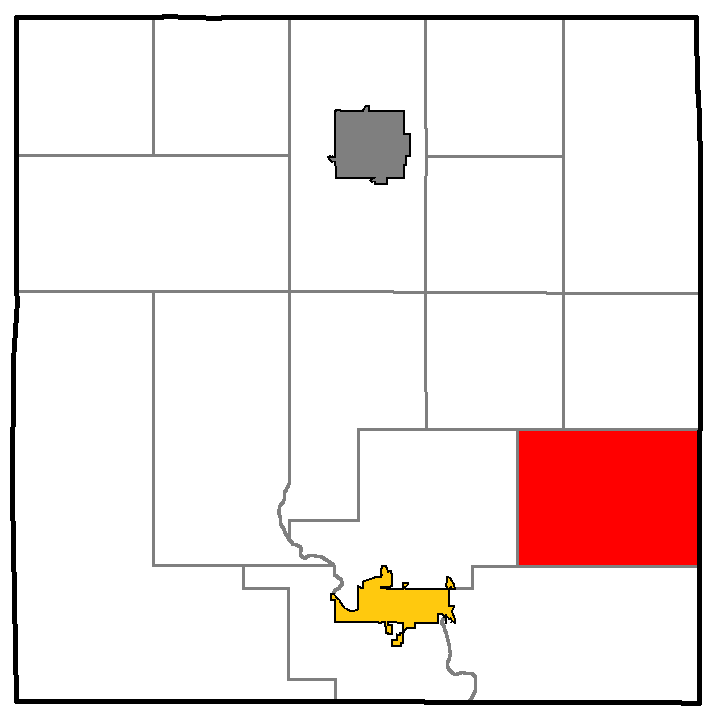
- Location of Schley, within Lincoln County

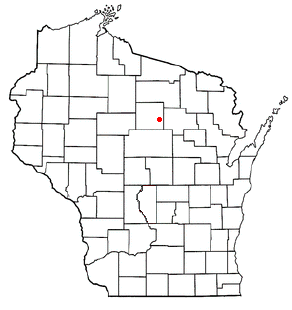
- Location of Schley, Wisconsin
- Coordinates: 45°15′53″N 89°31′11″W
- Country: United States
- State: Wisconsin
- County: Lincoln

Area
  - Total: 48.39 sq mi (125.32 km^{2})
  - Land: 48.17 sq mi (124.77 km^{2})
  - Water: 0.22 sq mi (0.56 km^{2})
- Elevation: 1,473 ft (449 m)

Population (2020)
  - Total: 950
  - Density: 20/sq mi (7.6/km^{2})
- Time zone: UTC-6 (Central (CST))
  - Summer (DST): UTC-5 (CDT)
- ZIP Codes: 54452 (Merrill); 54435 (Gleason)
- Area codes: 715 & 534
- FIPS code: 55-72100
- GNIS feature ID: 1584110
- Website: townofschley.com

Schley is a town in Lincoln County, Wisconsin, United States. The population was 950 at the 2020 census. The unincorporated communities of Doering and Dutch Corners are located in the town. The unincorporated community of Bloomville is also located partially in the town.

== Geography ==
Schley is in southeastern Lincoln County and is bordered to the east by Langlade County. Wisconsin Highway 17 crosses the northwestern part of the town, leading southwest 9 miles (14 km) to Merrill, the Lincoln county seat, and north-northeast 31 miles (50 km) to Rhinelander.

According to the United States Census Bureau, the town has a total area of 48.4 square miles (125.3 km^{2}), of which 48.2 square miles (124.8 km^{2}) are land and 0.2 square miles (0.6 km^{2}), or 0.44%, are water. The northwestern part of the town is drained by the Prairie River, while the rest of the town is drained by tributaries of the Pine River. Both rivers are southwest-flowing tributaries of the Wisconsin River.

== Demographics ==
As of the census of 2000, there were 909 people, 356 households, and 264 families residing in the town. The population density was 18.8 people per square mile (7.3/km^{2}). There were 395 housing units at an average density of 8.2 per square mile (3.2/km^{2}). The racial makeup of the town was 99.12% White, 0.55% Asian, 0.22% from other races, and 0.11% from two or more races. Hispanic or Latino people of any race were 0.88% of the population.

There were 356 households, out of which 32.9% had children under the age of 18 living with them, 63.5% were married couples living together, 4.2% had a female householder with no husband present, and 25.8% were non-families. 22.8% of all households were made up of individuals, and 7.3% had someone living alone who was 65 years of age or older. The average household size was 2.55 and the average family size was 2.97.

In the town, the population was spread out, with 23.7% under the age of 18, 7.8% from 18 to 24, 34.7% from 25 to 44, 22.4% from 45 to 64, and 11.4% who were 65 years of age or older. The median age was 38 years. For every 100 females, there were 110.4 males. For every 100 females age 18 and over, there were 117.6 males.

The median income for a household in the town was $40,703, and the median income for a family was $47,375. Males had a median income of $30,045 versus $21,848 for females. The per capita income for the town was $17,460. About 3.7% of families and 6.5% of the population were below the poverty line, including 7.1% of those under age 18 and 12.5% of those age 65 or over.
