= Spirit Lake =

Spirit Lake may refer to:

== Communities ==
In the United States:

- Spirit Lake, Idaho
- Spirit Lake, Iowa
- Spirit Lake Tribe in North Dakota

== Lakes ==
=== Canada ===
- Spirit Lake (Yukon) in the Yukon Territory
- Spirit Lake (Saskatchewan) in Saskatchewan
- Good Spirit Lake in Saskatchewan

=== United States ===
- Spirit Lake (Idaho)
- Spirit Lake (Iowa), in northwestern Iowa
- Spirit Lake (South Dakota), in eastern South Dakota
- Spirit Lake (Utah), Eastern, North slope Uintah Mountains
- Spirit Lake (Washington), in southwestern Washington
- Spirit Lake (Price County, Wisconsin)

== Other ==
- Spirit Lake Massacre, an 1857 attack by Sioux on settlers in Spirit Lake, Iowa
- Spirit Lake internment camp for Ukrainians in Canada during World War I
