= Somo, Wisconsin =

- Town
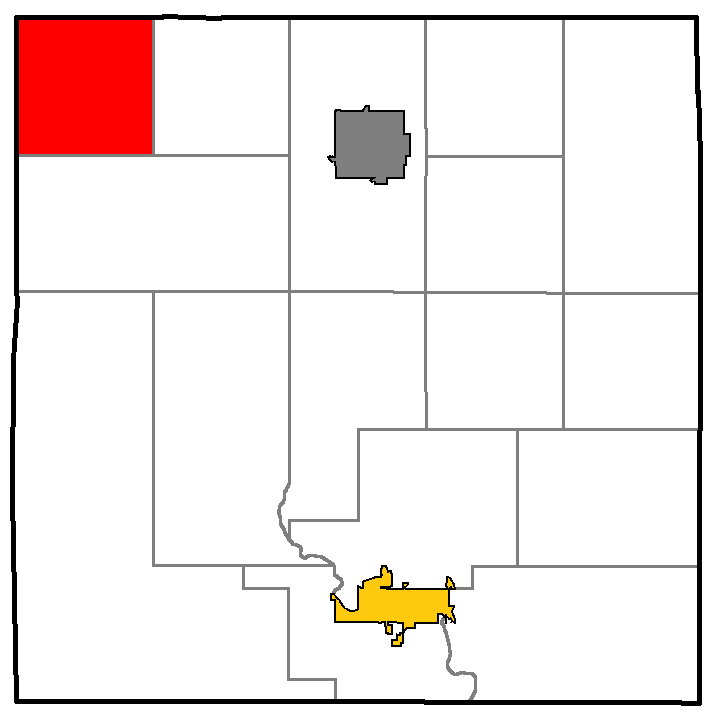
- Location of Somo, within Lincoln County

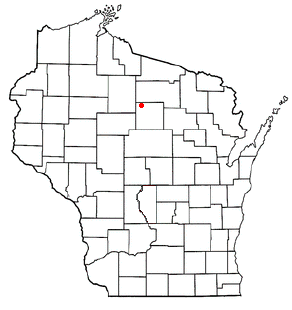
- Location of Somo, Wisconsin
- Coordinates: 45°30′48″N 90°0′3″W
- Country: United States
- State: Wisconsin
- County: Lincoln

Area
  - Total: 36.32 sq mi (94.06 km^{2})
  - Land: 36.18 sq mi (93.71 km^{2})
  - Water: 0.14 sq mi (0.35 km^{2})
- Elevation: 1,512 ft (461 m)

Population (2020)
  - Total: 123
  - Density: 3.40/sq mi (1.31/km^{2})
- Time zone: UTC-6 (Central (CST))
  - Summer (DST): UTC-5 (CDT)
- ZIP Code: 54564 (Tripoli)
- Area codes: 715 & 534
- FIPS code: 55-069-74725
- GNIS feature ID: 1584176
- Website: https://www.townofsomo.com/

Somo is a town in Lincoln County, Wisconsin, United States. The population was 123 at the 2020 census. The unincorporated communities of Clifford and Tripoli are located partially in the town.

== Geography ==
Somo occupies the northwestern corner of Lincoln County, with Oneida County to the north and Price County to the west. U.S. Route 8 runs along the northern border of the town, passing through Tripoli and leading east 16 miles (26 km) to U.S. Route 51 north of Tomahawk and west 15 miles (24 km) to Prentice.

According to the United States Census Bureau, the town of Somo has a total area of 36.3 square miles (94.1 km^{2}), of which 36.2 square miles (93.7 km^{2}) are land and 0.14 square miles (0.35 km^{2}), or 0.37%, are water. The northern and eastern parts of town are drained by the Somo River and its tributaries, while the southern and western parts are drained by tributaries of the Spirit River. Both rivers are east-flowing tributaries of the Wisconsin River.

== Demographics ==
As of the census of 2000, there were 121 people, 57 households, and 38 families residing in the town. The population density was 3.3 people per square mile (1.3/km^{2}). There were 85 housing units at an average density of 2.3 per square mile (0.9/km^{2}). The racial makeup of the town was 100% White.

There were 57 households, out of which 15.8% had children under the age of 18 living with them, 63.2% were married couples living together, 3.5% had a female householder with no husband present, and 33.3% were non-families. 28.1% of all households were made up of individuals, and 12.3% had someone living alone who was 65 years of age or older. The average household size was 2.12 and the average family size was 2.61.

In the town, the population was spread out, with 16.5% under the age of 18, 5.8% from 18 to 24, 21.5% from 25 to 44, 33.1% from 45 to 64, and 23.1% who were 65 years of age or older. The median age was 48 years. For every 100 females, there were 101.7 males. For every 100 females age 18 and over, there were 98 males.

The median income for a household in the town was $22,250, and the median income for a family was $31,875. Males had a median income of $24,375 versus $20,625 for females. The per capita income for the town was $19,374. There were 17.9% of families and 18.4% of the population living below the poverty line, including 27.3% of under eighteens and none of those over 64.
