= Jeffris =

Jeffris may refer to:

- Jeffris, Wisconsin, an unincorporated community in Harrison, Lincoln County, Wisconsin, United States
- Jeffris Hopkins (born 1950), Welsh cricketer
