= Bloomville =

Bloomville refers to the following places in the United States:

- Bloomville, New York, a hamlet and CDP in Delaware County
- Bloomville, Ohio, a village in Seneca County
- Bloomville, Wisconsin, an unincorporated community in Lincoln County
