= Knox, Wisconsin =

- Town
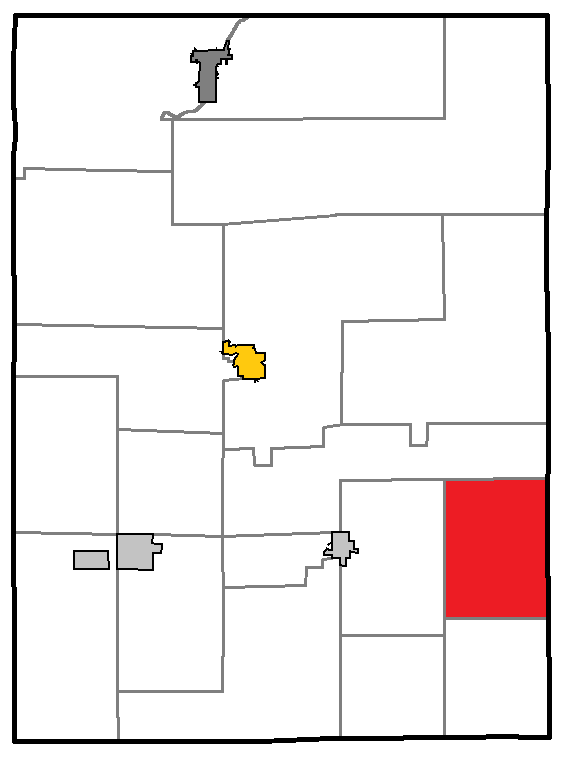
- Location of Knox, within Price County
- Coordinates: 45°32′48″N 90°5′20″W
- Country: United States
- State: Wisconsin
- County: Price

Area
  - Total: 48.1 sq mi (124.5 km^{2})
  - Land: 48.1 sq mi (124.5 km^{2})
  - Water: 0.039 sq mi (0.1 km^{2})
- Elevation: 1,709 ft (521 m)

Population (2020)
  - Total: 311
  - Density: 6.47/sq mi (2.50/km^{2})
- Time zone: UTC-6 (Central (CST))
  - Summer (DST): UTC-5 (CDT)
- Area codes: 715 & 534
- FIPS code: 55-40175
- GNIS feature ID: 1583491

Knox is a town in Price County, Wisconsin, United States. The population was 311 at the 2020 census. The unincorporated community of Brantwood is located with the town. The unincorporated community of Clifford is located partially in the town. The ghost town of Knox Mills is also located in the town.

== Geography ==
According to the United States Census Bureau, the town has a total area of 48.1 square miles (124.6 km^{2}), of which 48.1 square miles (124.5 km^{2}) is land and 0.04 square miles (0.1 km^{2}) (0.04%) is water.

== Demographics ==
As of the census of 2000, there were 399 people, 173 households, and 111 families residing in the town. The population density was 8.3 people per square mile (3.2/km^{2}). There were 240 housing units at an average density of 5.0 per square mile (1.9/km^{2}). The racial makeup of the town was 99.50% White and 0.50% Native American. Hispanic or Latino people of any race were 2.01% of the population.

There were 173 households, out of which 22.0% had children under the age of 18 living with them, 55.5% were married couples living together, 4.0% had a female householder with no husband present, and 35.3% were non-families. 30.1% of all households were made up of individuals, and 13.9% had someone living alone who was 65 years of age or older. The average household size was 2.31 and the average family size was 2.89.

In the town, the population was spread out, with 20.8% under the age of 18, 5.5% from 18 to 24, 27.1% from 25 to 44, 28.8% from 45 to 64, and 17.8% who were 65 years of age or older. The median age was 43 years. For every 100 females, there were 111.1 males. For every 100 females age 18 and over, there were 115.0 males.

The median income for a household in the town was $28,824, and the median income for a family was $35,000. Males had a median income of $27,344 versus $16,838 for females. The per capita income for the town was $20,674. About 5.4% of families and 10.8% of the population were below the poverty line, including 25.9% of those under age 18 and 8.5% of those age 65 or over.
