= Harding, Wisconsin =

- Town
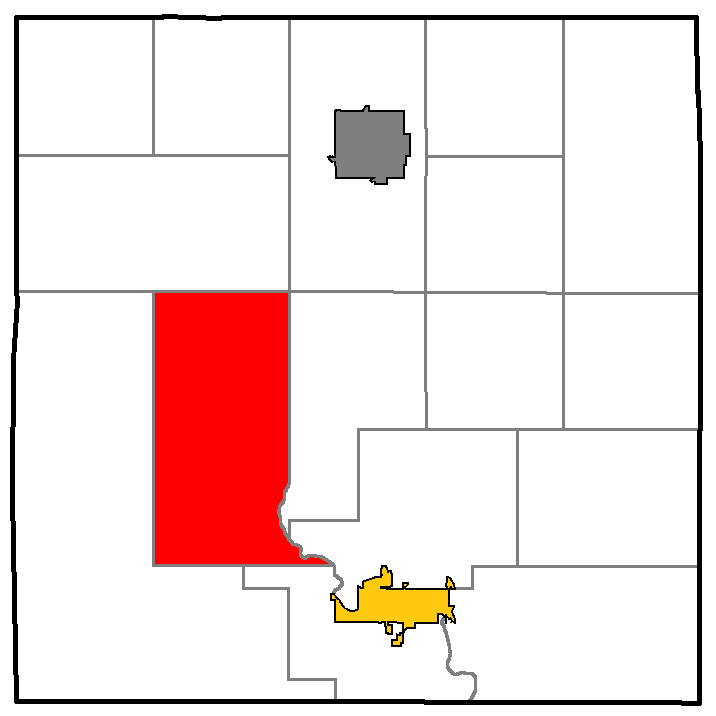
- Location of Harding, within Lincoln County

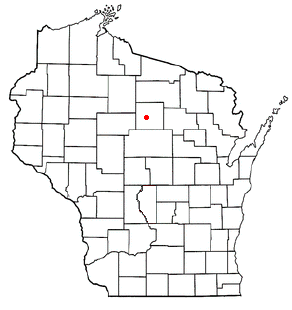
- Location of Harding, Wisconsin
- Coordinates: 45°15′53″N 89°51′3″W
- Country: United States
- State: Wisconsin
- County: Lincoln

Area
  - Total: 72.8 sq mi (188.5 km^{2})
  - Land: 71.3 sq mi (184.7 km^{2})
  - Water: 1.4 sq mi (3.7 km^{2})
- Elevation: 1,380 ft (420 m)

Population (2020)
  - Total: 364
  - Density: 5.10/sq mi (1.97/km^{2})
- Time zone: UTC-6 (Central (CST))
  - Summer (DST): UTC-5 (CDT)
- ZIP Codes: 54452 (Merrill); 54487 (Tomahawk)
- Area codes: 715 & 534
- FIPS code: 55-32650
- GNIS feature ID: 1583349
- Website: https://www.townofharding.com/

Harding is a town in Lincoln County, Wisconsin, United States. The population was 364 at the 2020 census, down from 372 at the 2010 census.

== Geography ==
Harding is in west-central Lincoln County, on the west side of the Wisconsin River. According to the United States Census Bureau, the town has a total area of 72.8 square miles (188.5 km^{2}), of which 71.3 square miles (184.7 km^{2}) are land and 1.4 square miles (3.7 km^{2}), or 1.98%, are water.

== Demographics ==
As of the census of 2000, there were 334 people, 129 households, and 105 families residing in the town. The population density was 4.6 people per square mile (1.8/km^{2}). There were 224 housing units at an average density of 3.1 per square mile (1.2/km^{2}). The racial makeup of the town was 98.5% White, 0.3% Native American, 0.3% Pacific Islander, 0.6% from other races, and 0.3% from two or more races. Hispanic or Latino people of any race were 0.6% of the population.

There were 129 households, out of which 31% had children under the age of 18 living with them, 73.6% were married couples living together, 2.3% had a female householder with no husband present, and 18.6% were non-families. 14% of all households were made up of individuals, and 3.1% had someone living alone who was 65 years of age or older. The average household size was 2.59 and the average family size was 2.83.

In the town, the population was spread out, with 25.7% under the age of 18, 7.2% from 18 to 24, 28.1% from 25 to 44, 27.5% from 45 to 64, and 11.4% who were 65 years of age or older. The median age was 39 years. For every 100 females, there were 111.4 males. For every 100 females age 18 and over, there were 100 males.

The median income for a household in the town was $43,250, and the median income for a family was $45,833. Males had a median income of $32,000 versus $30,357 for females. The per capita income for the town was $19,933. About 7.7% of families and 6.9% of the population were below the poverty line, including 13% of those under age 18 and none of those age 65 or over.
