= McCord Village =

- U.S. National Register of Historic Places
- Nearest city: Lynne, Wisconsin
- NRHP reference No.: 01000346 and 05000102
- Added to NRHP: April 06, 2001 (original); February 24, 2005 (increase)

McCord Village, also known as 47ON221, is an archeological site near Lynne, Wisconsin, in Oneida County, Wisconsin. It was listed on the National Register of Historic Places in 2001 and its boundaries were increased in 2005.

According to a Wisconsin Land Economic Inventory, there were seven occupied buildings on the site as of March, 1938. It was reported in the early 1950s that only one family remained, with an Ojibwe husband and a Potawatomi wife, and it was later reported that the village was entirely abandoned.
