= Merrill (town), Wisconsin =

Merrill, Wisconsin
- Town
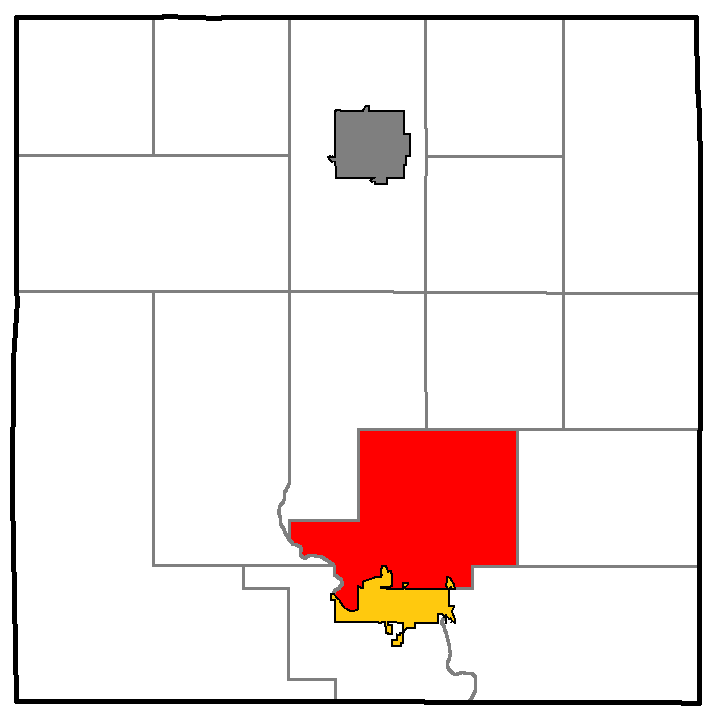
- Location of Merrill, within Lincoln County

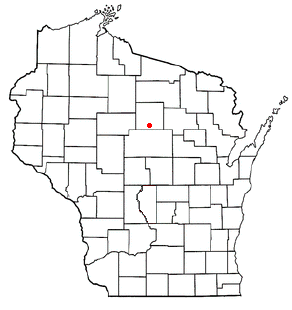
- Location of Merrill, Wisconsin
- Coordinates: 45°13′16″N 89°40′58″W
- Country: United States
- State: Wisconsin
- County: Lincoln

Area
  - Total: 53.2 sq mi (137.9 km^{2})
  - Land: 51.7 sq mi (133.9 km^{2})
  - Water: 1.5 sq mi (4 km^{2})
- Elevation: 1,348 ft (411 m)

Population (2020)
  - Total: 2,881
  - Density: 55.73/sq mi (21.52/km^{2})
- Time zone: UTC-6 (Central (CST))
  - Summer (DST): UTC-5 (CDT)
- ZIP Code: 54452
- Area codes: 715 & 534
- FIPS code: 55-51275
- GNIS feature ID: 1583702
- Website: townofmerrillwi.gov

Merrill is a town in Lincoln County, Wisconsin, United States. The population was 2,881 at the 2020 census. The city of Merrill is located to the south of and adjacent to the town. The city has incorporated a portion of land that had been part of the town. The unincorporated community of Otis is also located in the town.

== Geography ==
The town of Merrill is in southern Lincoln County. U.S. Route 51 crosses the town from north to south. According to the United States Census Bureau, the town has a total area of 53.2 square miles (137.9 km^{2}), of which 51.7 square miles (133.9 km^{2}) are land and 1.5 square miles (4 km^{2}), or 2.88%, are water. The Wisconsin River forms the southwestern border of the town, and the Prairie River crosses the southeastern part of the town, joining the Wisconsin in the city of Merrill.

== Demographics ==
As of the census of 2000, there were 2,979 people, 1,125 households, and 895 families residing in the town. The population density was 57.2 people per square mile (22.1/km^{2}). There were 1,210 housing units at an average density of 23.2 per square mile (9/km^{2}). The racial makeup of the town was 98.69% White, 0.1% Black or African American, 0.17% Native American, 0.27% Asian, 0.13% from other races, and 0.64% from two or more races. 0.34% of the population were Hispanic or Latino of any race.

There were 1,125 households, out of which 36.4% had children under the age of 18 living with them, 70% were married couples living together, 6.6% had a female householder with no husband present, and 20.4% were non-families. 16.5% of all households were made up of individuals, and 5.2% had someone living alone who was 65 years of age or older. The average household size was 2.65 and the average family size was 2.96.

In the town, the population was spread out, with 26% under the age of 18, 5.7% from 18 to 24, 30.1% from 25 to 44, 27.3% from 45 to 64, and 10.9% who were 65 years of age or older. The median age was 39 years. For every 100 females, there were 102.8 males. For every 100 females age 18 and over, there were 99.9 males.

The median income for a household in the town was $48,875, and the median income for a family was $51,892. Males had a median income of $33,309 versus $23,125 for females. The per capita income for the town was $18,677. About 1.2% of families and 2.8% of the population were below the poverty line, including 0.5% of those under age 18 and 10.5% of those age 65 or over.
