= Spirit Falls, Wisconsin =

- Unincorporated community
- Location within Wisconsin Location within the United States
- Coordinates: 45°27′11″N 89°58′51″W
- Country: United States
- State: Wisconsin
- County: Lincoln
- Town: Tomahawk
- Elevation: 1,483 ft (452 m)
- Time zone: UTC-6 (Central (CST))
  - Summer (DST): UTC-5 (CDT)
- Area codes: 715 & 534
- GNIS feature ID: 1574554

Spirit Falls is an unincorporated community in the town of Tomahawk, Lincoln County, Wisconsin, United States.

== Climate ==
The Köppen Climate Classification subtype for this climate is "Dfb" (Warm Summer Continental Climate).
