= Clifford, Wisconsin =

- Unincorporated community
- Location within Wisconsin Location within the United States
- Coordinates: 45°33′19″N 90°02′36″W
- Country: United States
- State: Wisconsin
- Counties: Lincoln, Oneida and Price
- Towns: Somo, Lynne, and Knox
- Elevation: 1,565 ft (477 m)
- Time zone: UTC-6 (Central (CST))
  - Summer (DST): UTC-5 (CDT)
- Area codes: 715 & 534
- GNIS feature ID: 1577547

Clifford is an unincorporated community in Lincoln, Oneida, and Price counties, Wisconsin, United States. Clifford is located in the towns of Somo in Lincoln County, Lynne in Oneida County, and Knox in Price County. The community is located on U.S. Route 8, 12 miles (19 km) east of Prentice.
