= Brantwood, Wisconsin =

- Unincorporated community
- Location within Wisconsin Location within the United States
- Coordinates: 45°33′46″N 90°06′55″W
- Country: United States
- State: Wisconsin
- County: Price
- Elevation: 1,690 ft (520 m)
- Time zone: UTC-6 (Central (CST))
  - Summer (DST): UTC-5 (CDT)
- ZIP code: 54513
- Area codes: 715 & 534
- GNIS feature ID: 1562158

Brantwood is an unincorporated community in southern Price County, Wisconsin, United States located within the town of Knox. It lies along U.S. Highway 8 and on the Wisconsin Central Railroad, between Prentice on the west and Tomahawk to the east. The rural community was settled in the late 1890s as a logging community.

== History ==
Francis Palms was the first to purchase acreage in the area, and later sold the land to William and Samuel Knox. The Knox brothers were loggers from the Stevens Point, Wisconsin area. They established the small community of Knox Mills a few miles south of Brantwood when they built a mill. The need to transport timber and products resulted in a spur being built from Brantwood to Knox Mills.

J. B. Engstrom owned a sawmill, a planing mill, and a boarding house for the mostly immigrant bachelor workers in Knox Mills. The mill prospered in the 1920s, but the Great Depression shut it down until the late 1930s. Knox Mills, having no post office or main line railroad, began to disappear. The area was absorbed into the Brantwood community and the spur line abandoned.

As the land was stripped of its timber, the Knox brothers began selling it to immigrants for farm land. The community slowly changed from a booming logging industry to a sedate farming and dairy community.

Land advertisements were targeted to Swedish, Norwegian, and Finnish immigrants living in other states. K. A. Ostergen and E. H. Hobe, both agents for the railroad, assisted the railroad company and the Knox brothers in marketing the land sales.

According to the 1900 US Census, there were 411 people living in the Town of Knox, which included Brantwood and Knox Mills. By 1910, the population was 1,010; in 1920 the census counted 1,251 people in the Town of Knox.

The Finns of Brantwood established a cooperative store and cheese factory that prospered well into the 1960s. However, with no industry to entice new people to the area or keep young adults there after graduation, Brantwood slowly declined as well. In the 2000 US Census there were only 399 people living in the Town of Knox.
