= Harrison, Lincoln County, Wisconsin =

Harrison, Wisconsin
- Town
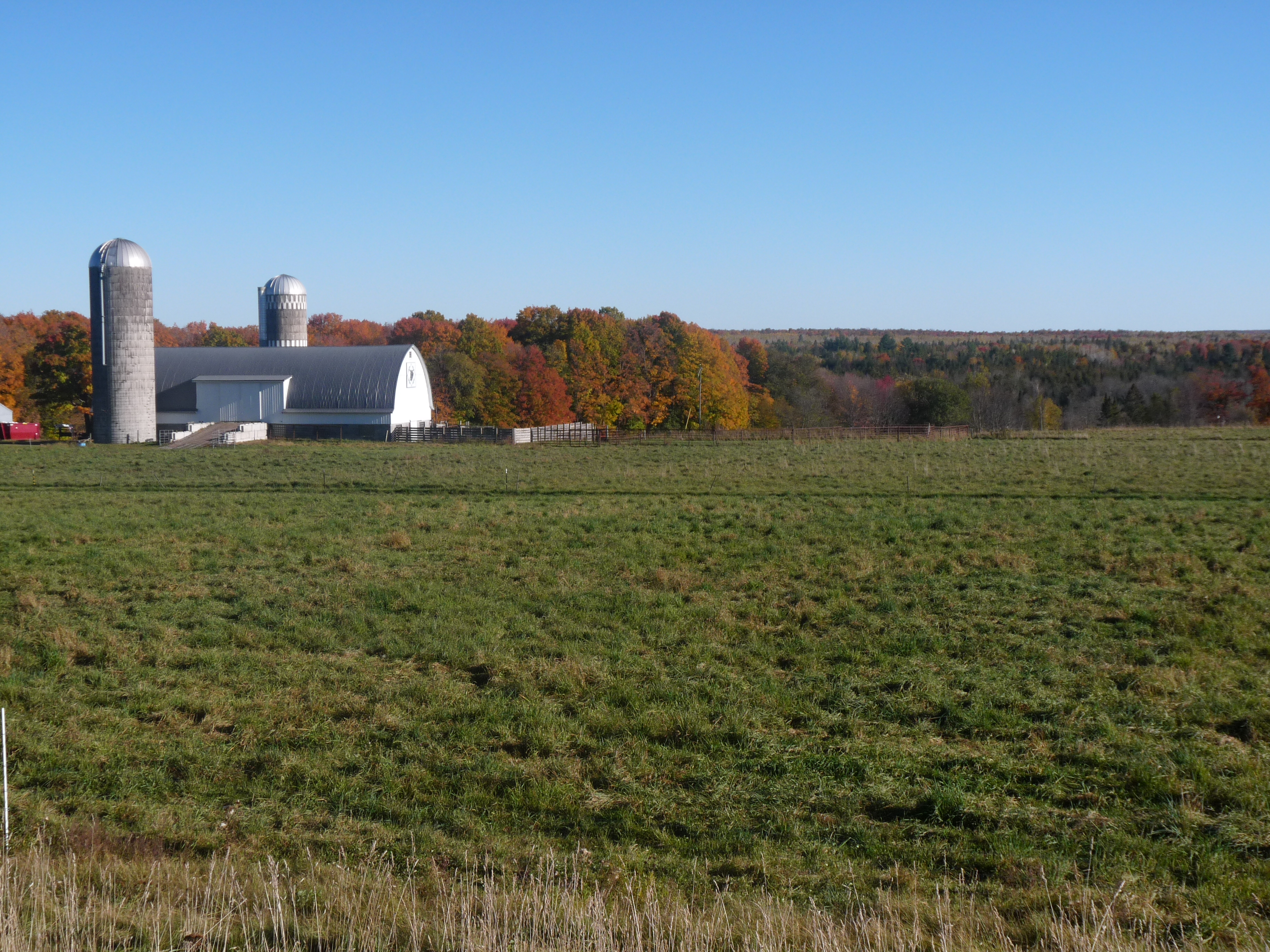
- Harrison is mostly forest, with patches of farmland

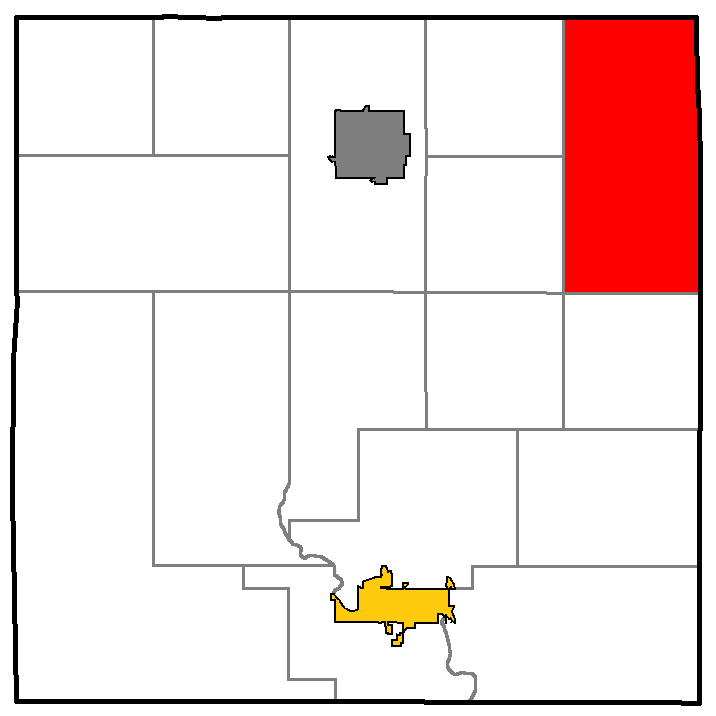
- Location of Harrison, within Lincoln County

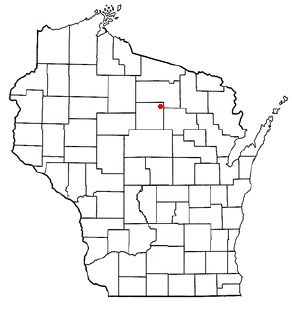
- Location of Harrison, Wisconsin
- Coordinates: 45°28′49″N 89°30′6″W
- Country: United States
- State: Wisconsin
- County: Lincoln

Area
  - Total: 72.1 sq mi (186.8 km^{2})
  - Land: 68.8 sq mi (178.2 km^{2})
  - Water: 3.3 sq mi (8.6 km^{2})
- Elevation: 1,696 ft (517 m)

Population (2020)
  - Total: 828
  - Density: 12.0/sq mi (4.65/km^{2})
- Time zone: UTC-6 (Central (CST))
  - Summer (DST): UTC-5 (CDT)
- ZIP Codes: 54435 (Gleason); 54487 (Tomahawk); 54501 (Rhinelander)
- Area codes: 715 & 534
- FIPS code: 55-32875
- GNIS feature ID: 1583356
- PLSS township: T34N R8E and T35N R8E
- Website: www.townofharrisonwisconsin.com

Harrison is a town in Lincoln County, Wisconsin, United States. The population was 828 at the 2020 census, down from 833 at the 2010 census. The unincorporated communities of Bundy, Harrison, and Jeffris are located in the town.

== Geography ==
Harrison occupies the northeastern corner of Lincoln County; it is bordered to the north and east by Oneida County, and the southern part of its eastern border is with Langlade County. According to the United States Census Bureau, the town has a total area of 72.1 square miles (186.8 km^{2}), of which 68.8 square miles (178.2 km^{2}) are land and 3.3 square miles (8.6 km^{2}), or 4.6%, are water. The Wisconsin River runs along the northern edge of the town, and the Prairie River, a tributary of the Wisconsin, crosses the southeastern corner. The town is full of dozens of small lakes, particularly in the Harrison Hills in the southern part of town.

== History ==
The two six-mile squares that would become Harrison were first surveyed in July and August 1851 by a crew working for the U.S. government. In November and December 1854 another crew marked the section corners of the southern six miles, walking through the woods and wading the streams, measuring with chain and compass. When done, the deputy surveyor filed this general description for the southern six miles:

The general Surface of this Township is very rough and uneven(?), Soil mostly of 3rd rate or Worthless, Swamps Low and Wet, There are numerous Small Lakes in this Township Some of which (?) Lake [undecipherable], the Water is clear and good. The Shores are gravelly, Some few Maple ridges mixed(?) in with other [indecipherable] Timber, no Pine of good quality mostly small white Pine, the Primeifal Timber is Hemlock [indecipherable] and Birch.

Ten years later in April 1865, another crew walked the section lines of the northern six miles, submitting this general description:

This Township has no large Streams. The Wisconsin River Enters in Sec. 3. A Stream about 2(?) chs. wide runs a Westerly direction - The timber is not of a good quality Hemlock Birch Tamarac to(?) The Soil is not [indecipherable] 2nd rate The surface is level therefore the Marshes and ponds cannot be drained(?) There are no Settlements.

== Demographics ==
As of the census of 2000, there were 793 people, 314 households, and 243 families residing in the town. The population density was 11.4 people per square mile (4.4/km^{2}). There were 679 housing units at an average density of 9.8 per square mile (3.8/km^{2}). The racial makeup of the town was 98.99% White, 0.5% Asian, and 0.5% from two or more races. Hispanic or Latino people of any race were 1.01% of the population.

There were 314 households, out of which 31.5% had children under the age of 18 living with them, 71.7% were married couples living together, 2.2% had a female householder with no husband present, and 22.6% were non-families. 18.2% of all households were made up of individuals, and 8% had someone living alone who was 65 years of age or older. The average household size was 2.53 and the average family size was 2.85.

In the town, the population was spread out, with 24.8% under the age of 18, 3.9% from 18 to 24, 28.4% from 25 to 44, 27.2% from 45 to 64, and 15.6% who were 65 years of age or older. The median age was 41 years. For every 100 females, there were 109.8 males. For every 100 females age 18 and over, there were 104.1 males.

The median income for a household in the town was $42,500, and the median income for a family was $50,625. Males had a median income of $40,250 versus $24,861 for females. The per capita income for the town was $19,463. About 4.6% of families and 7.5% of the population were below the poverty line, including 14.3% of those under age 18 and 8.9% of those age 65 or over.
