= Bradley, Wisconsin =

- Town
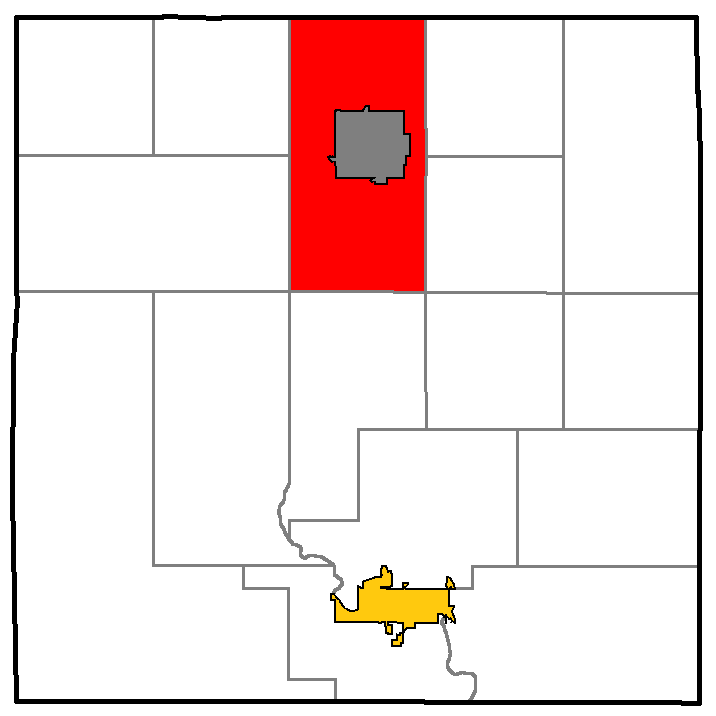
- Location of Bradley, within Lincoln County, Wisconsin

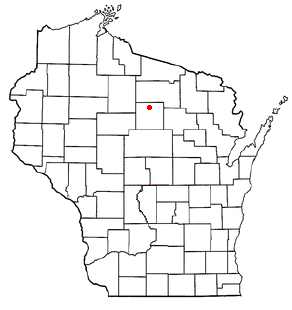
- Location of Bradley, Wisconsin
- Coordinates: 45°29′51″N 89°43′35″W
- Country: United States
- State: Wisconsin
- County: Lincoln

Area
  - Total: 62.9 sq mi (162.9 km^{2})
  - Land: 54.5 sq mi (141.2 km^{2})
  - Water: 8.4 sq mi (21.7 km^{2})
- Elevation: 1,440 ft (440 m)

Population (2020)
  - Total: 2,382
  - Density: 43.69/sq mi (16.87/km^{2})
- Time zone: UTC-6 (Central (CST))
  - Summer (DST): UTC-5 (CDT)
- ZIP Code: 54487 (Tomahawk)
- Area codes: 715 & 534
- FIPS code: 55-09225
- GNIS feature ID: 1582851
- Website: www.townofbradley.org

Bradley is a town in Lincoln County, Wisconsin, United States. The population was 2,382 at the 2020 census, down from 2,408 at the 2010 census. The unincorporated communities of Bradley, Gilbert, Heafford Junction, and West Kraft are located in the town.

== Geography ==
Bradley occupies northern Lincoln County and is bordered to the north by Oneida County. It surrounds the city of Tomahawk, a separate municipality. The U.S. Route 51 freeway runs along the eastern side of the town, leading south 21 miles (34 km) to Merrill, the Lincoln county seat, and north 85 miles (137 km) to Hurley.

According to the United States Census Bureau, the town has a total area of 62.9 square miles (162.9 km^{2}), of which 54.5 square miles (141.2 km^{2}) are land and 8.4 square miles (21.7 km^{2}), or 13.3%, are water. The Wisconsin River flows through the town and the center of Tomahawk, where it is joined by the Tomahawk, Somo, and Spirit rivers. The river system is impounded by the Tomahawk Dam in Bradley just south of the Tomahawk city limits, forming Lake Mohawksin, and by a separate dam forming the Spirit River Flowage. Upstream, the Wisconsin is impounded by Kings Dam in the east part of Bradley, forming Lake Alice.

== Demographics ==
As of the 2000 census, there were 2,573 people, 1,094 households, and 801 families residing in the town. The population density was 46.2 people per square mile (17.8/km^{2}). There were 1,840 housing units at an average density of 33 per square mile (12.7/km^{2}). The racial makeup of the town was 99.11% White, 0.08% African American, 0.08% Native American, 0.12% Asian, 0.04% Pacific Islander, 0.19% from other races, and 0.39% from two or more races. Hispanic or Latino people of any race were 0.31% of the population.

There were 1,094 households, out of which 26.8% had children under the age of 18 living with them, 65.6% were married couples living together, 4.8% had a female householder with no husband present, and 26.7% were non-families. 23.4% of all households were made up of individuals, and 11.2% had someone living alone who was 65 years of age or older. The average household size was 2.35 and the average family size was 2.75.

In the town, the population was spread out, with 20.9% under the age of 18, 4.1% from 18 to 24, 25.3% from 25 to 44, 29.6% from 45 to 64, and 20.2% who were 65 years of age or older. The median age was 45 years. For every 100 females, there were 107.2 males. For every 100 females age 18 and over, there were 104.2 males.

The median income for a household in the town was $38,676, and the median income for a family was $45,774. Males had a median income of $37,125 versus $25,179 for females. The per capita income for the town was $19,803. About 2.8% of families and 5.5% of the population were below the poverty line, including 10.1% of those under age 18 and 4.5% of those age 65 or over.
