= Knox Mills, Wisconsin =

- Ghost town
- Location within Wisconsin
- Coordinates: 45°30′00″N 90°06′46″W
- Country: United States
- State: Wisconsin
- County: Price

Knox Mills is a ghost town in the town of Knox, in Price County, Wisconsin, United States. The community was located on Old Mill Road, near Knox Creek, just off County Highway D, between the unincorporated communities of Brantwood and Spirit.

== History ==
Knox Mills was founded by the brothers William H. and Samuel G. Knox to be used as a company town for their lumber business. The Knox Brothers had an agreement with Wisconsin Central Railroad to put a railroad spur in for their lumber business. In 1931, the railroad spur was removed due to the declining lumber business. In 1975, the cheese factory closed.
