= Pine River, Wisconsin =

- Town
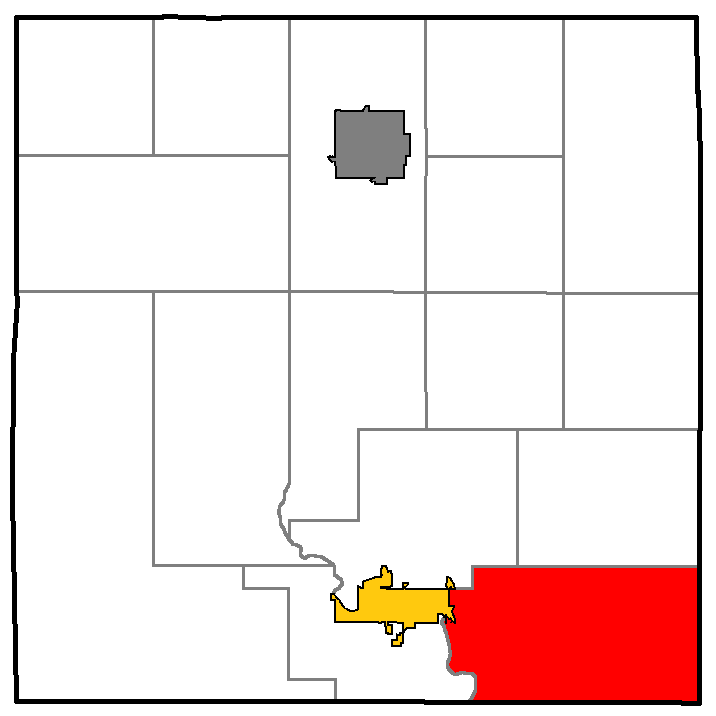
- Location of Pine River, within Lincoln County

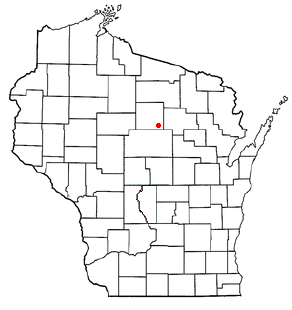
- Location of Pine River, Wisconsin
- Coordinates: 45°9′44″N 89°34′11″W
- Country: United States
- State: Wisconsin
- County: Lincoln

Area
  - Total: 63.9 sq mi (165.5 km^{2})
  - Land: 63.4 sq mi (164.2 km^{2})
  - Water: 0.50 sq mi (1.3 km^{2})
- Elevation: 1,512 ft (461 m)

Population (2020)
  - Total: 1,874
  - Density: 29.56/sq mi (11.41/km^{2})
- Time zone: UTC-6 (Central (CST))
  - Summer (DST): UTC-5 (CDT)
- ZIP Code: 54452 (Merrill)
- Area codes: 715 & 534
- FIPS code: 55-62950
- GNIS feature ID: 1583926
- Website: www.townofpineriver.com

Pine River is a town in Lincoln County, Wisconsin, United States. The population was 1,874 at the time of the 2020 census.

== Geography ==
The town of Pine River occupies the southeastern corner of Lincoln County. It is bordered to the east by Langlade County and to the south by Marathon County. Part of the town's western border is with the city of Merrill, the Lincoln county seat. The remainder of the western border follows the Wisconsin River.

According to the United States Census Bureau, the town has a total area of 63.9 square miles (165.5 km^{2}), of which 63.4 square miles (164.2 km^{2}) are land and 0.50 square miles (1.3 km^{2}), or 0.78%, are water. The Pine River crosses the town from northeast to southwest, joining the Wisconsin at the unincorporated community of Pine River.

== Demographics ==
As of the census of 2000, there were 1,877 people, 673 households, and 565 families residing in the town. The population density was 29.3 people per square mile (11.3/km^{2}). There were 724 housing units at an average density of 11.3 per square mile (4.4/km^{2}). The racial makeup of the town was 98.51% White, 0.05% African American, 0.59% Asian, 0.05% from other races, and 0.8% from two or more races. Hispanic or Latino people of any race were 0.43% of the population.

There were 673 households, out of which 38.3% had children under the age of 18 living with them, 74.7% were married couples living together, 5.3% had a female householder with no husband present, and 15.9% were non-families. 12.3% of all households were made up of individuals, and 3.4% had someone living alone who was 65 years of age or older. The average household size was 2.79 and the average family size was 3.04.

In the town, the population was spread out, with 27% under the age of 18, 6.6% from 18 to 24, 32% from 25 to 44, 25.4% from 45 to 64, and 9.1% who were 65 years of age or older. The median age was 37 years. For every 100 females, there were 107.4 males. For every 100 females age 18 and over, there were 107.7 males.

The median income for a household in the town was $47,723, and the median income for a family was $50,455. Males had a median income of $31,818 versus $22,628 for females. The per capita income for the town was $18,449. About 3.3% of families and 4.7% of the population were below the poverty line, including 6.3% of those under age 18 and 12.4% of those age 65 or over.
