= Dudley, Wisconsin =

- Unincorporated community
- Location within Wisconsin Location within the United States
- Coordinates: 45°20′08″N 89°27′55″W
- Country: United States
- State: Wisconsin
- County: Lincoln
- Town: Russell
- Elevation: 1,470 ft (450 m)
- Time zone: UTC-6 (Central (CST))
  - Summer (DST): UTC-5 (CDT)
- Area codes: 715 & 534
- GNIS feature ID: 1577578

Dudley is an unincorporated community located in the town of Russell, Lincoln County, Wisconsin, United States. The community was founded by businessman Henry Dudley as a waystation between Wausau and lumber camps further north.
