= Lincoln Hills School =

Juvenile correctional facility in Wisconsin, United States

Lincoln Hills
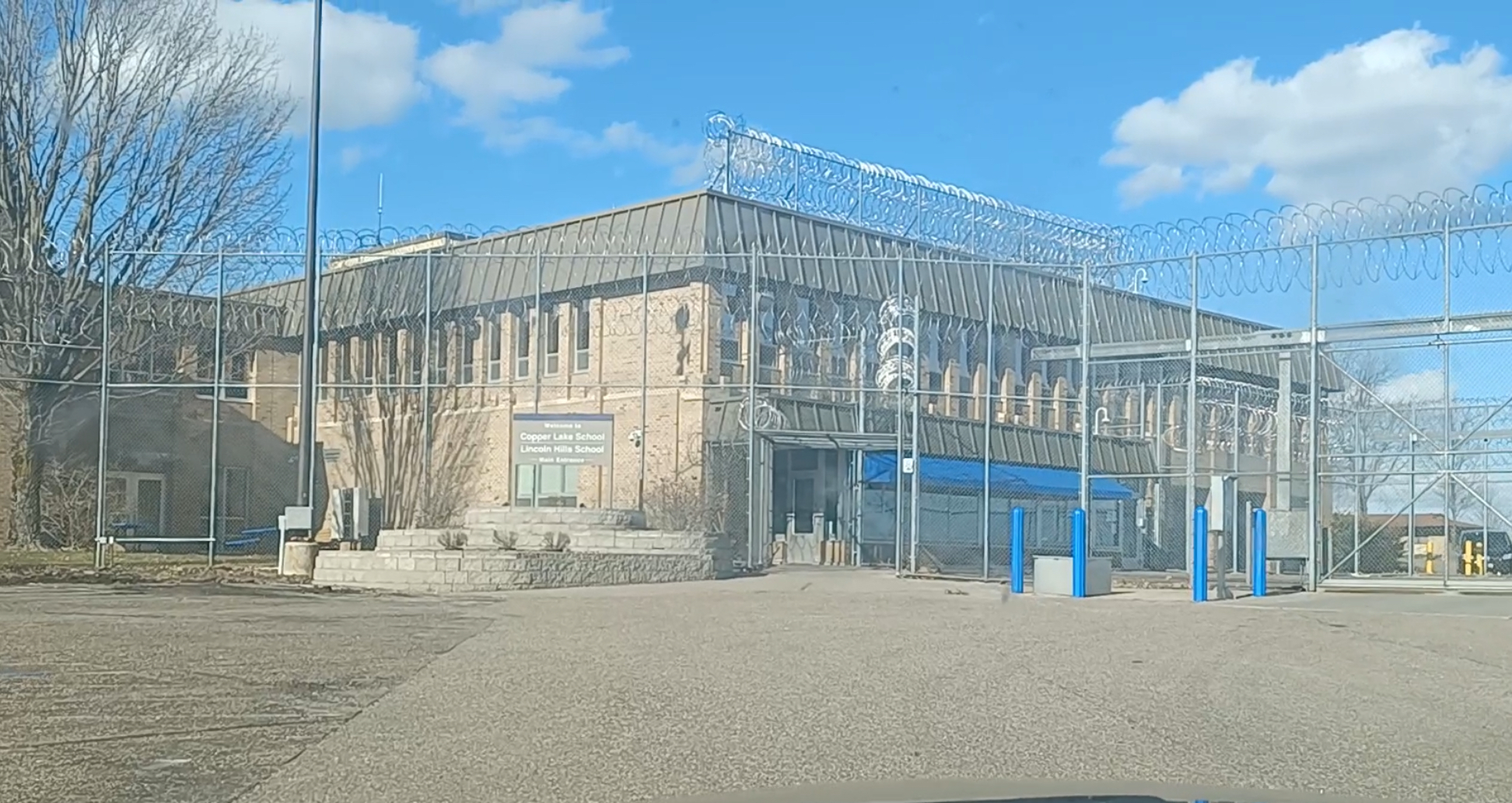
- The prison pictured in April 2022
- Interactive map of Lincoln Hills
- Location: Irma, Wisconsin, U.S.; 45°19′30″N 89°38′21″W
- Status: Operational
- Security class: Type 1 secure juvenile prison
- Opened: Summer 1970
- Managed by: Wisconsin Department of Corrections; Division of Juvenile Corrections

Lincoln Hills School is a juvenile detention facility operated by the Wisconsin Department of Corrections for juvenile boys. It is located in the unincorporated community of Irma in Lincoln County, Wisconsin, sharing operations and a campus Copper Lake School, a facility for girls. Lincoln Hills was constructed in 1970 and Copper Lake in 2011.
