= Lynne, Wisconsin =

- Town
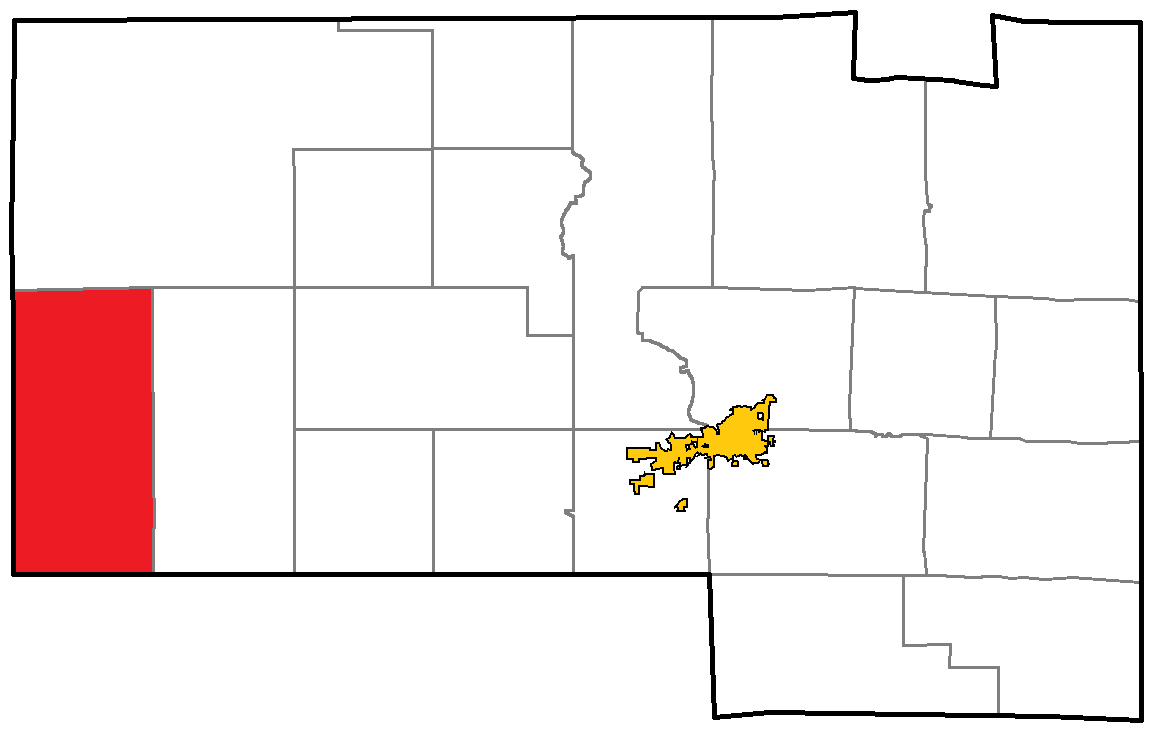
- Location of Lynne, within Oneida County
- Coordinates: 45°37′59″N 89°58′0″W
- Country: United States
- State: Wisconsin
- County: Oneida

Area
  - Total: 72.0 sq mi (186.5 km^{2})
  - Land: 70.5 sq mi (182.6 km^{2})
  - Water: 1.5 sq mi (3.9 km^{2})
- Elevation: 1,565 ft (477 m)

Population (2020)
  - Total: 139
  - Density: 1.97/sq mi (0.761/km^{2})
- Time zone: UTC-6 (Central (CST))
  - Summer (DST): UTC-5 (CDT)
- Area codes: 715 & 534
- FIPS code: 55-46650
- GNIS feature ID: 1583616
- Website: https://townoflynneoneidactywi.gov/

Lynne is a town in Oneida County, Wisconsin, United States. The population was 139 at the 2020 census. The unincorporated communities of Clifford and Tripoli are located partially in the town.

== Geography ==
According to the United States Census Bureau, the town has a total area of 72.0 square miles (186.5 km^{2}), of which 70.5 square miles (182.6 km^{2}) is land and 1.5 square miles (3.9 km^{2}) (2.08%) is water.

== Demographics ==
As of the census of 2000, there were 210 people, 92 households, and 64 families residing in the town. The population density was 3.0 people per square mile (1.2/km^{2}). There were 298 housing units at an average density of 4.2 per square mile (1.6/km^{2}). The racial makeup of the town was 98.57% White, 0.95% Native American, and 0.48% from two or more races.

There were 92 households, out of which 19.6% had children under the age of 18 living with them, 64.1% were married couples living together, 2.2% had a female householder with no husband present, and 30.4% were non-families. 25.0% of all households were made up of individuals, and 9.8% had someone living alone who was 65 years of age or older. The average household size was 2.28 and the average family size was 2.72.

In the town, the population was spread out, with 16.7% under the age of 18, 4.3% from 18 to 24, 26.2% from 25 to 44, 27.1% from 45 to 64, and 25.7% who were 65 years of age or older. The median age was 46 years. For every 100 females, there were 114.3 males. For every 100 females age 18 and over, there were 113.4 males.

The median income for a household in the town was $27,344, and the median income for a family was $35,000. Males had a median income of $28,333 versus $20,750 for females. The per capita income for the town was $16,430. About 8.9% of families and 17.5% of the population were below the poverty line, including 39.4% of those under the age of eighteen and 3.5% of those 65 or over.

== Historical places ==
The McCord Village, an archeological site, is located within the town.

== Transportation ==
The Rhinelander-Oneida County Airport (KRHI) serves Lynne, the county and surrounding communities with both scheduled commercial jet service and general aviation services.
