= Harrison (community), Lincoln County, Wisconsin =

Harrison, Wisconsin
- Unincorporated community
- Location within Wisconsin Location within the United States
- Coordinates: 45°28′39″N 89°30′24″W
- Country: United States
- State: Wisconsin
- County: Lincoln
- Town: Harrison
- Elevation: 1,598 ft (487 m)
- Time zone: UTC-6 (Central (CST))
  - Summer (DST): UTC-5 (CDT)
- Area codes: 715 & 534
- GNIS feature ID: 1566089

Harrison is an unincorporated community located in the town of Harrison, Lincoln County, Wisconsin, United States.

== History ==
A post office was first established under the name Harrison in 1888. The community was named for Benjamin Harrison, who won the 1888 presidential election and served as 23rd president of the United States.
