= Birch, Wisconsin =

- Town
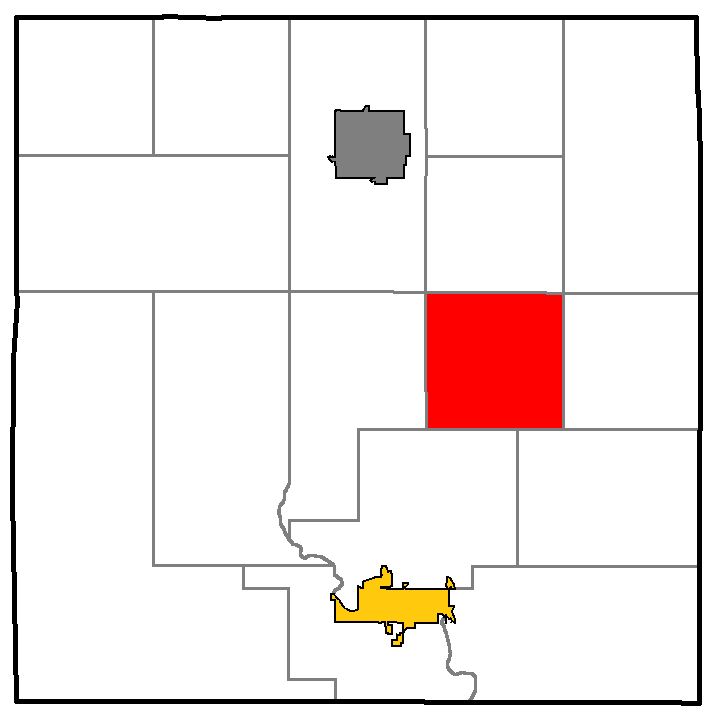
- Location of Birch, within Lincoln County, Wisconsin

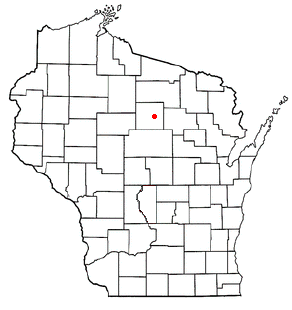
- Location of Birch, Wisconsin
- Coordinates: 45°20′14″N 89°36′38″W
- Country: United States
- State: Wisconsin
- County: Lincoln

Area
  - Total: 36.12 sq mi (93.54 km^{2})
  - Land: 35.66 sq mi (92.35 km^{2})
  - Water: 0.46 sq mi (1.20 km^{2})
- Elevation: 1,503 ft (458 m)

Population (2020)
  - Total: 570
  - Density: 16/sq mi (6.2/km^{2})
- Time zone: UTC-6 (Central (CST))
  - Summer (DST): UTC-5 (CDT)
- ZIP Codes: 54442 (Irma); 54435 (Gleason)
- Area codes: 715 & 534
- FIPS code: 55-07500
- GNIS feature ID: 1582810

Birch is a town in Lincoln County, Wisconsin, United States. As of the 2020 census, the town had a population of 570, down from 594 at the 2010 census. The unincorporated community of Irma is located in the town.

== Geography ==
Birch is in east-central Lincoln County, 12 miles (19 km) north of Merrill, the county seat. U.S. Route 51 passes through the west side of the town, passing through Irma; it leads south to Merrill and north 9 miles (14 km) to Tomahawk.

According to the United States Census Bureau, the town of Birch has a total area of 36.1 square miles (93.5 km^{2}), of which 35.6 square miles (92.3 km^{2}) are land and 0.46 square miles (1.2 km^{2}), or 1.28%, are water.

== Demographics ==
As of the census of 2000, there were 801 people, 179 households, and 134 families residing in the town. The population density was 22.4 people per square mile (8.6/km^{2}). There were 250 housing units at an average density of 7 per square mile (2.7/km^{2}). The racial makeup of the town was 76.53% White, 11.49% African American, 4.62% Native American, 1.37% Asian, 2% from other races, and 4% from two or more races. Hispanic or Latino people of any race were 4.87% of the population.

There were 179 households, out of which 36.3% had children under the age of 18 living with them, 67.6% were married couples living together, 5% had a female householder with no husband present, and 24.6% were non-families. 22.3% of all households were made up of individuals, and 6.7% had someone living alone who was 65 years of age or older. The average household size was 2.65 and the average family size was 3.10.

In the town, the population was spread out, with 54.7% under the age of 18, 5.9% from 18 to 24, 16.4% from 25 to 44, 16.6% from 45 to 64, and 6.5% who were 65 years of age or older. The median age was 18 years. For every 100 females, there were 264.1 males. For every 100 females age 18 and over, there were 125.5 males.

The median income for a household in the town was $41,442, and the median income for a family was $45,938. Males had a median income of $32,031 versus $25,278 for females. The per capita income for the town was $11,074. About 8.5% of families and 9.5% of the population were below the poverty line, including 15.3% of those under age 18 and 4.8% of those age 65 or over.
