= Heafford Junction, Wisconsin =

- Unincorporated community
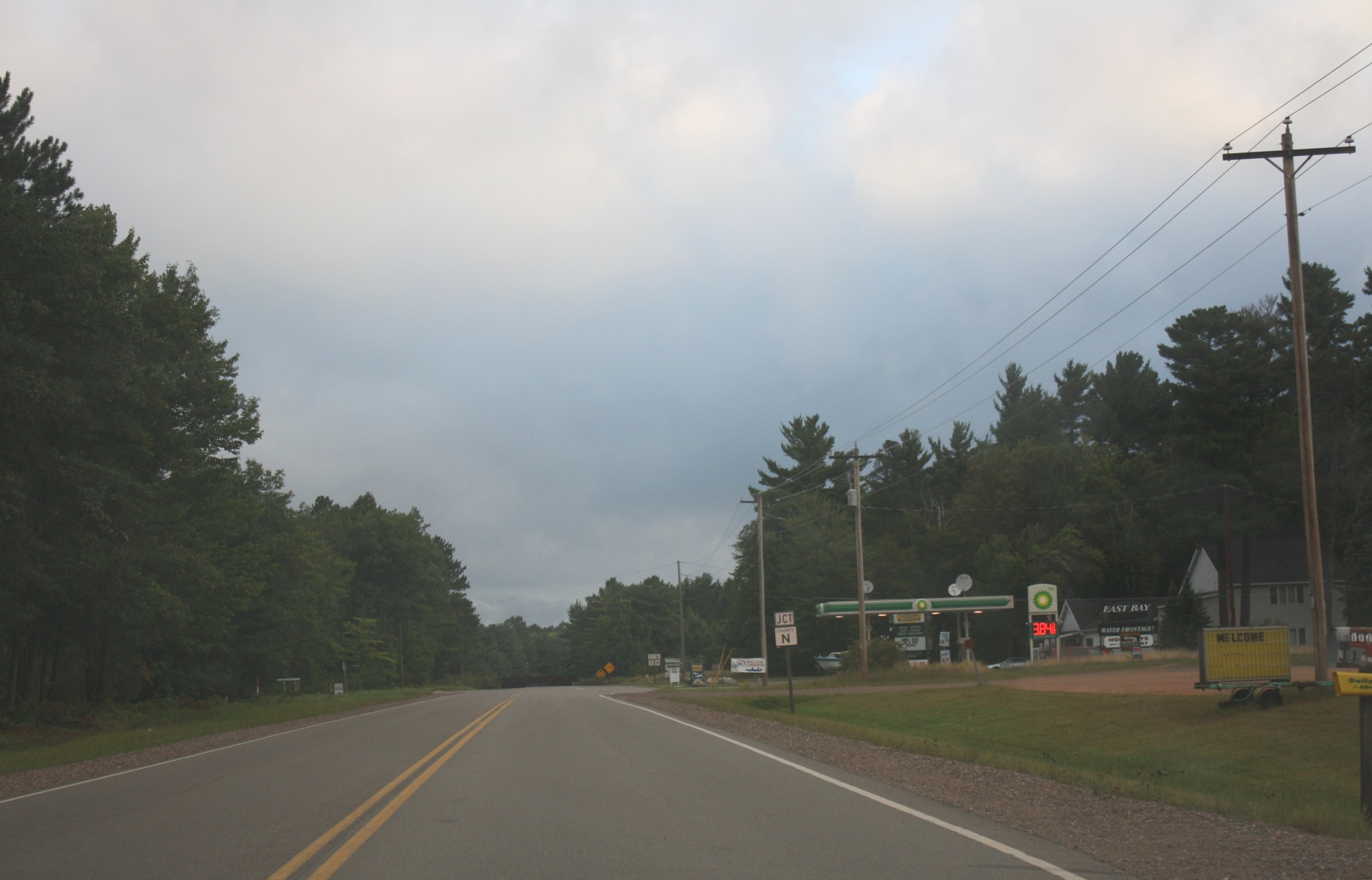
- Looking north at Heafford Junction

- Location within Wisconsin Location within the United States
- Coordinates: 45°32′50″N 89°42′56″W
- Country: United States
- State: Wisconsin
- County: Lincoln
- Town: Bradley
- Elevation: 1,489 ft (454 m)
- Time zone: UTC-6 (Central (CST))
  - Summer (DST): UTC-5 (CDT)
- ZIP code: 54532
- Area codes: 715 & 534
- GNIS feature ID: 1566242

Heafford Junction is an unincorporated community located in Lincoln County, Wisconsin, United States. Heafford Junction is located along U.S. Route 8, north of Tomahawk, in the town of Bradley, and is surrounded by several lakes. Heafford Junction was named for George Heafford, an employee of the Chicago, Milwaukee & St. Paul Railroad. The community had a post office, which was opened by its first postmaster, Warren Slater, in March 1898. It closed on November 30, 1984.
