= Wisconsin Highway 17 =

State highway in Wisconsin, United States

State Trunk Highway 17
- WIS 17 highlighted in red

Route information
- Maintained by WisDOT
- Length: 85.63 mi (137.81 km)

Major junctions
- South end: WIS 64 / CTH-W in Merrill
- US 8 / WIS 47 in Rhinelander; US 45 / WIS 32 / WIS 70 in Eagle River
- North end: CR 436 near Phelps

Location
- Country: United States
- State: Wisconsin
- Counties: Lincoln, Langlade, Oneida, Vilas

Highway system
- Wisconsin State Trunk Highway System; Interstate; US; State; Scenic; Rustic
← WIS 16	→ US 18
← US 63	WIS 63	→ WIS 64

State Trunk Highway 17 (often called Highway 17, STH-17 or WIS 17) is a state highway in the U.S. state of Wisconsin. The highway is a secondary route in northeastern Wisconsin that directly connects Rhinelander, Eagle River and the central and eastern parts of Michigan's Upper Peninsula with Wausau, Wisconsin and points south and west.

== Route description ==
WIS 17 begins at WIS 64, about a half mile east of WIS 64's interchange with US 51 near Merrill. From there, WIS 17 heads northeast, passing the Prairie Dells area and crossing several county routes in Bloomville and Gleason. The highway briefly crosses over out of Lincoln County into Langlade County, Wisconsin The highway then passes through Parrish and turns northwestward and returns to Lincoln County, briefly cutting through Oneida County in the process. The route then turns north for seven miles (11 km) and enters Oneida County heading north another five miles (8.0 km) and joining US 8 east and WIS 47 south just south of Rhinelander.

The two and a half mile concurrency is actually a "wrong-way" concurrency between WIS 17 North and WIS 47 south. WIS 17 turns north off the concurrency as the other two highways continue east. WIS 17 passes east of Rhinelander on an urban arterial then continues north, passing through Sugar Camp. WIS 17 then joins WIS 70 east, continuing into Eagle River. in the downtown area, WIS 17 leaves concurrency with WIS 70 and follows US 45 / WIS 32 north and out of the city. Four miles north, WIS 17 turns east off US 45/WIS 32 and heads northeast, entering the Nicolet National Forest and passing through Phelps. WIS 17 then heads east of Phelps, becoming Iron County Road 436 (Smokey Lake Road) upon entering Michigan. CR 436 meets Forest Highway 16 a short distance across the Michigan state line.

== History ==
WIS 17 originally began at the Illinois state line and passed through Kenosha, Racine, and into Milwaukee via present day WIS 32 to Whitefish Bay, then along WIS 57 through Cedarburg, Grafton and Saukville (along what is now CTH O). The route in Milwaukee was realigned to run along Lake Michigan in 1920. The route then headed north to Sheboygan and Manitowoc along present day WIS 42 and up the Lake Michigan Shoreline to Sturgeon Bay and Sister Bay. The route's southern terminus became Manitowoc when US 141 debuted in 1926. The remainder was replaced with WIS 42 in 1932.

The portion the current WIS 17 between Merrill and Eagle River was previously WIS 63. This route began at WIS 10 in Merrill and ended at WIS 70 west of Eagle River. The portion northeast of Eagle River was numbered as WIS 70. This route was removed in 1934 when U.S. Route 63 was opened into Wisconsin. The WIS 17 number was available at the time and applied to the route. The route was extended in 1947 when WIS 70 was changed to its current alignment. The southern terminus was relocated to its present location on WIS 64 in the late 1980s.

WIS 17 originally passed through Rhinelander. In 2004, The 3.25-mile (5.23 km) long bypass east of the city was opened. The route was rerouted along US 8/WIS 47 south of the city to reach the new bypass route. The old alignment through Rhinelander followed Boyce Drive to Kemp Street, turning east on to Kemp for 1,200 feet (370 m), then turning onto Arbutus and Pelham Streets and Stevens Street. This alignment was removed from the state trunkline books when the new route was opened and is now a city street.

== Major intersections ==
County	Location	mi	km	Destinations	Notes
Lincoln	Merrill	0.00	0.00	CTH-W south / WIS 64 – Merrill, Antigo	Southern terminus; road continues as CTH-W
Lincoln	Merrill	1.0	1.6	CTH-G	
Lincoln		5.3	8.5	CTH-C	
Lincoln		8.0	12.9	CTH-G	
Lincoln	Bloomville	10.5	16.9	CTH-J	
Lincoln	Gleason	13.0	20.9	CTH-X	
Lincoln		19.4	31.2	CTH-B	
Langlade	Parrish	23.1	37.2	CTH-H / CTH-Q	
Oneida	No major junctions				
Lincoln		28.9	46.5	CTH-D	
Oneida		32.5	52.3	CTH-A	
Oneida	Rhinelander	37.5	60.4	US 8 west / WIS 47 north	South end of US 8/WIS 47 concurrency
Oneida	Rhinelander	38.8	62.4	CTH-G	
Oneida	Rhinelander	40.1	64.5	US 8 east / WIS 47 south – Monico	North end of US 8/WIS 47 concurrency
Oneida	Rhinelander	41.5	66.8	CTH-P	
Oneida	Rhinelander	42.3	68.1	CTH-C	
Oneida		44.8	72.1	CTH-W	
Oneida	Sugar Camp	53.2	85.6	CTH-A	
Oneida	Sugar Camp	55.0	88.5	CTH-D	
Vilas	Eagle River	61.9	99.6	WIS 70 west – St. Germain	South end of WIS 70 concurrency
Vilas	Eagle River	63.9	102.8	US 45 / WIS 32 south / WIS 70 east (Pine Street east) – Three Lakes	North end of WIS 70 concurrency; south end of US 45/WIS 32 concurrency
Vilas	Eagle River	65.9	106.1	CTH-G	
Vilas	Eagle River	68.0	109.4	US 45 / WIS 32 north (32nd Division Memorial Highway) – Land O' Lakes	North end of US 45/WIS 32 concurrency
Vilas	Phelps	80.0	128.7	CTH-E	
Vilas	Phelps	81.7	131.5	CTH-A	
Wisconsin-Michigan line		85.63	137.81	CR 436 (Smokey Lake Road)	Continuation into Michigan
1.000 mi = 1.609 km; 1.000 km = 0.621 mi: Concurrency terminus
