= Spirit Lake (Price County, Wisconsin) =

Lake in the state of Wisconsin, United States

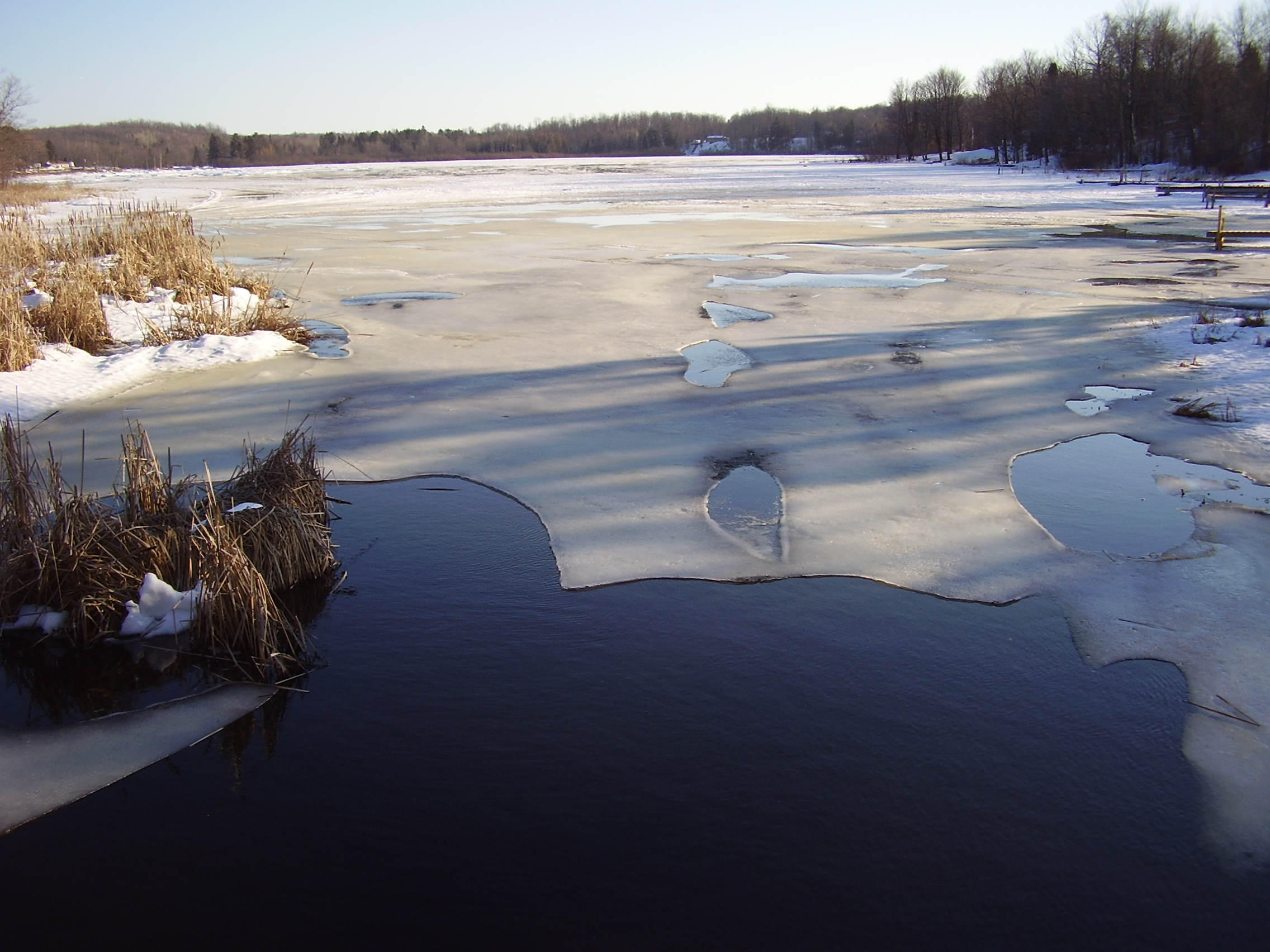
- Spirit Lake near its outlet. The photo was taken during a late winter thaw.

- Location within Wisconsin Location within the United States
- Coordinates: 45°22′50″N 90°08′13″W
- Primary outflows: Spirit River
- Basin countries: United States
- Surface area: 137 acres (55 ha)
- Average depth: 6 ft (1.8 m)
- Max. depth: 9 ft (2.7 m)
- Surface elevation: 1,601 ft (488 m)

Spirit Lake is a lake in Price County, Wisconsin and Taylor County, Wisconsin that is the source of the Spirit River. It is contiguous and at the same elevation as North Spirit Lake, connected by a narrow channel. The lake features a number of species of recreational fish including muskellunge, panfish, largemouth bass, northern pike and walleye.

In 1982 the non-profit Spirit Lakes Improvement Association was established for the purpose of improving the general quality of Spirit Lake and North Spirit Lake.
