= Jeffris, Wisconsin =

- Unincorporated community
- Location within Wisconsin Location within the United States
- Coordinates: 45°30′07″N 89°25′49″W
- Country: United States
- State: Wisconsin
- County: Lincoln
- Town: Harrison
- Elevation: 1,670 ft (510 m)
- Time zone: UTC-6 (Central (CST))
  - Summer (DST): UTC-5 (CDT)
- Area codes: 715 & 534
- GNIS feature ID: 1577661

Jeffris is an unincorporated community located in the town of Harrison, Lincoln County, Wisconsin, United States.

== History ==
A post office called Jeffris was established in 1891, and remained in operation until it was discontinued in 1930. The community was named for James K. Jeffris.
