= Tripoli, Wisconsin =

- Unincorporated community
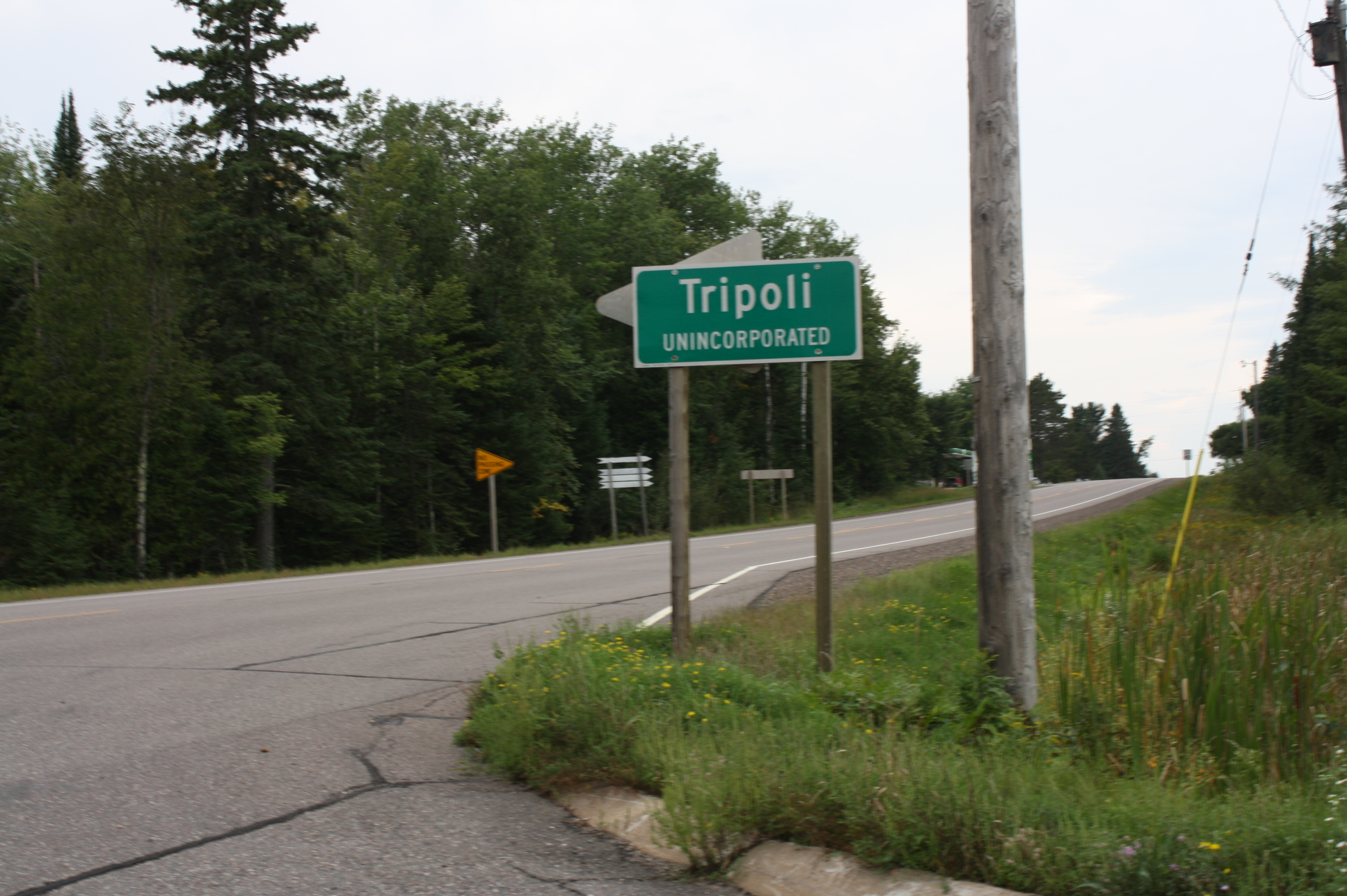
- Looking west at the Tripoli sign on US 8

- Location within Wisconsin Location within the United States
- Coordinates: 45°33′19″N 89°59′39″W
- Country: United States
- State: Wisconsin
- Counties: Lincoln, Oneida
- Towns: Somo, Lynne
- Elevation: 1,539 ft (469 m)
- Time zone: UTC-6 (Central (CST))
  - Summer (DST): UTC-5 (CDT)
- ZIP code: 54564
- Area codes: 715 & 534
- GNIS feature ID: 1575652

Tripoli is an unincorporated community in Lincoln and Oneida counties in the U.S. state of Wisconsin. Tripoli is located on U.S. Route 8, 31 miles (50 km) west of Rhinelander, in the towns of Somo and Lynne. Tripoli has a post office with ZIP code 54564.

== Images ==
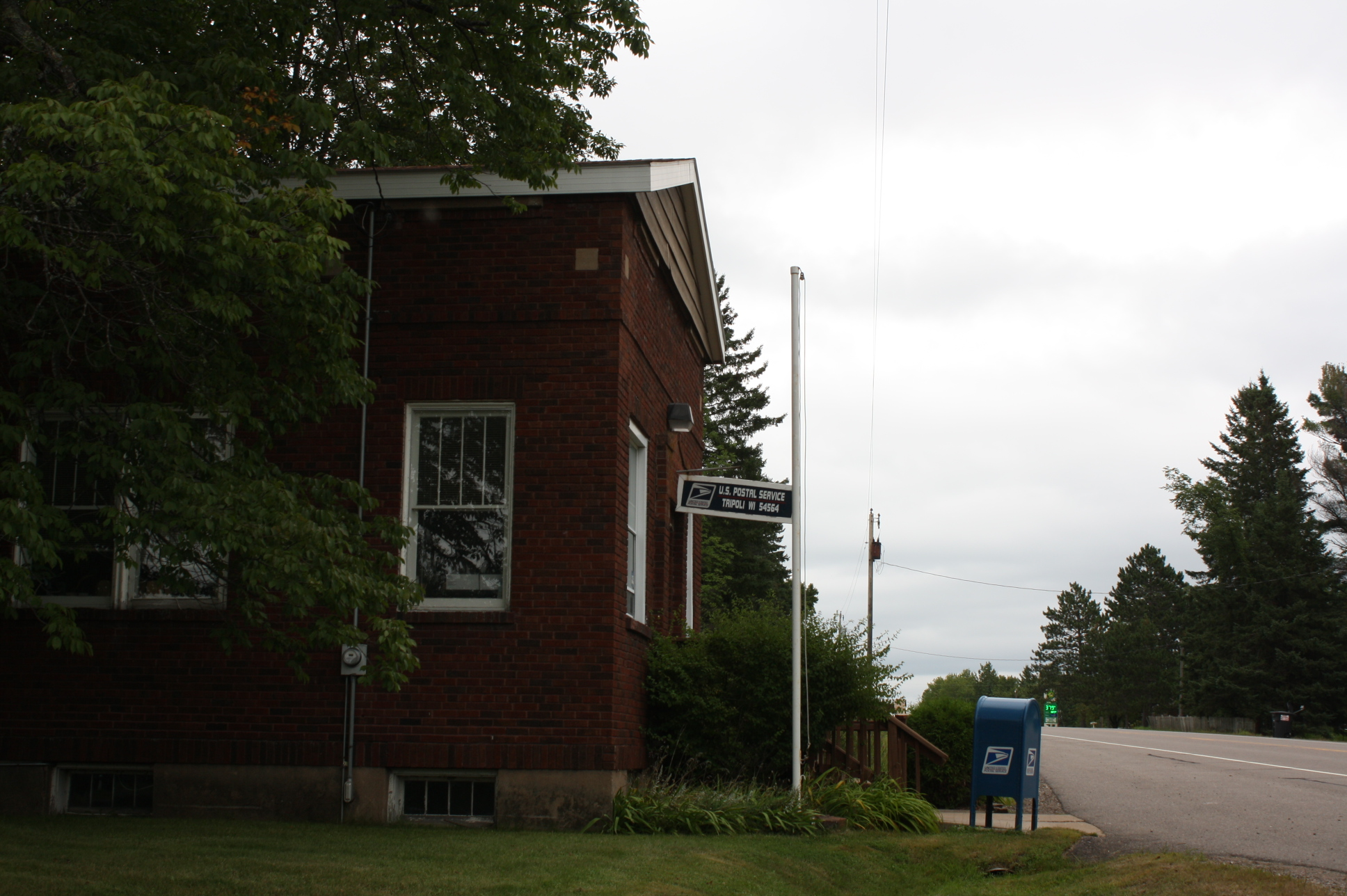
Post office

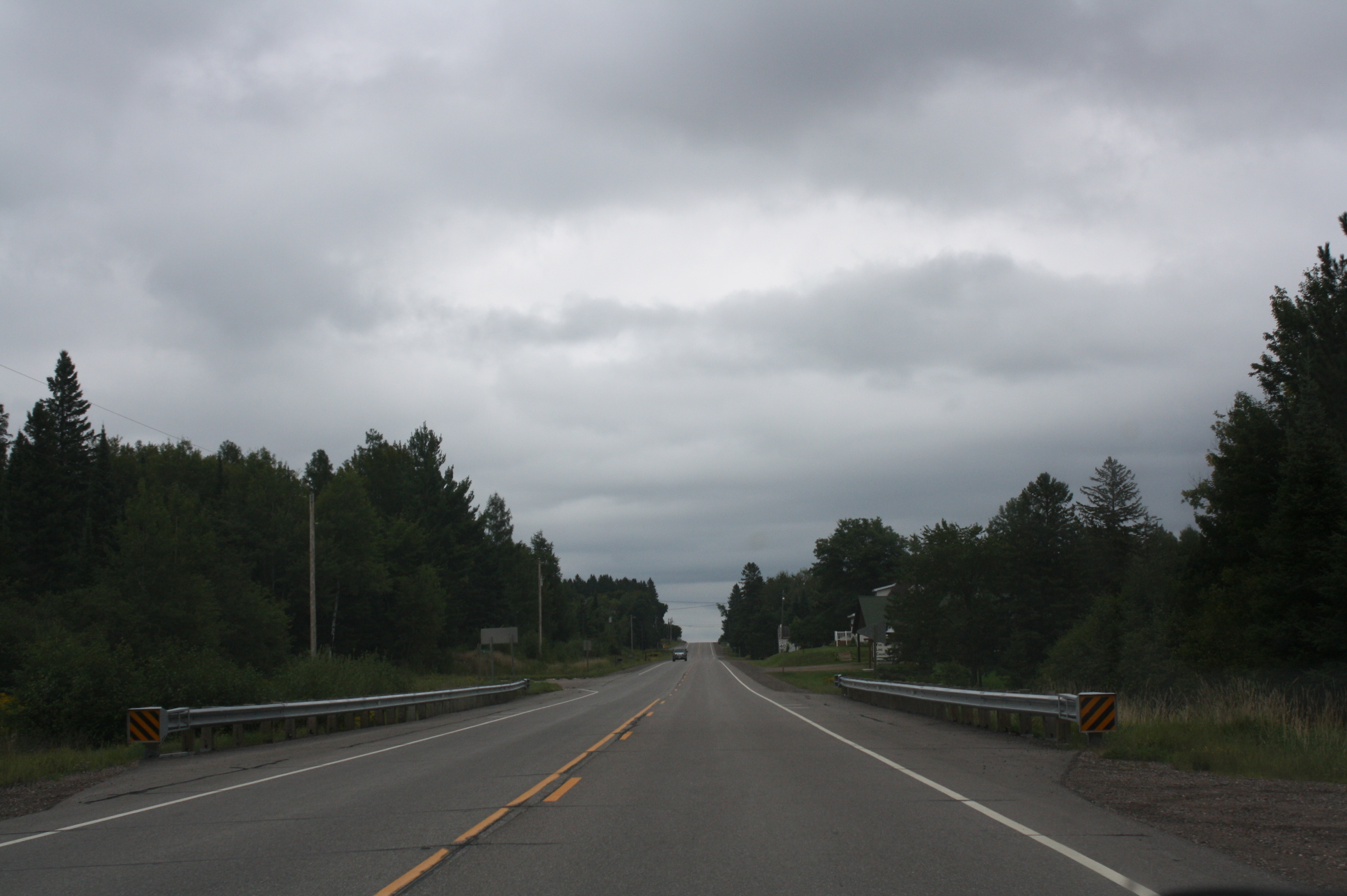
Looking east in Tripoli

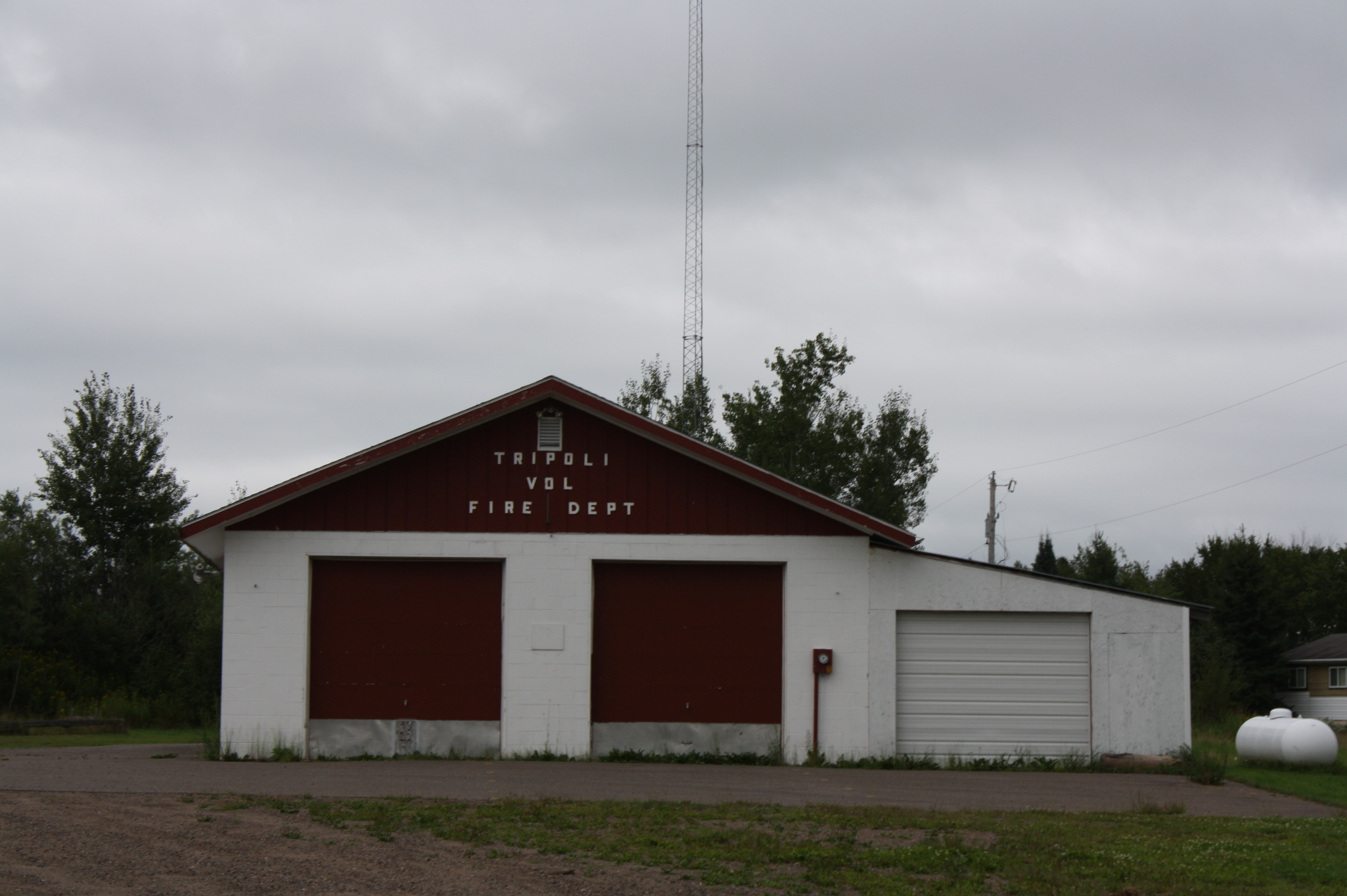
Volunteer Fire Department
