= Spirit River (Wisconsin) =

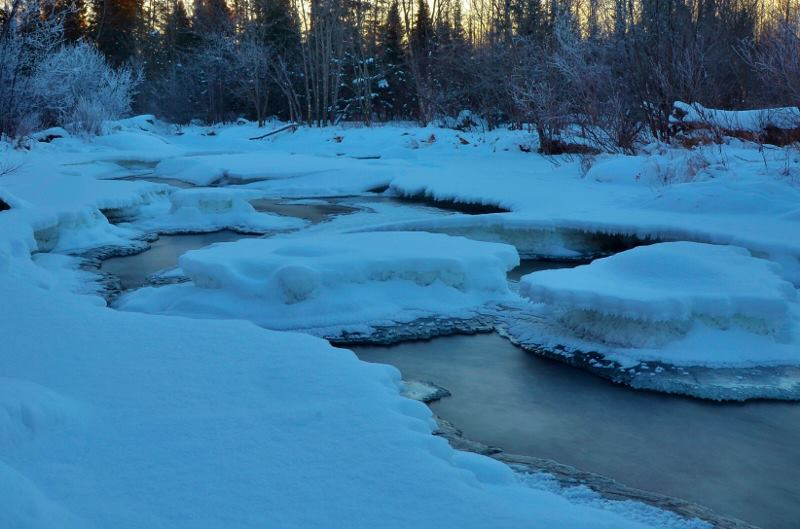
- Spirit Falls, New Year's Day 2013

Location
- Country: United States
- State: Wisconsin
- Region: Price County, Lincoln County

Physical characteristics
- Source: Spirit Lake
  - location: Price County, Wisconsin
  - coordinates: 45°23′5″N 90°8′0″W
- Mouth: Confluence with the Wisconsin River
  - location: Bradley Township, Lincoln County, Wisconsin
  - coordinates: 45°26′08″N 89°43′14″W

Basin features
- Tributaries
  - left: Squaw Creek (Wisconsin)
  - right: Coffee Creek (Wisconsin)

The Spirit River is a tributary of the Wisconsin River with headwaters in Price County and a confluence with the Wisconsin in Lincoln County just downstream from Lake Mohawksin. The source is Spirit Lake near Timms Hill. The Ojibwe name for the river was Manatokikewe Sebe (Stooping Spirit River). The river flows nearly west to east. About one mile from its mouth, the Wisconsin Valley Improvement Company maintains a dam which forms the Spirit River Flowage.

== See also ==
- List of rivers in Wisconsin
