= Bloomville, Wisconsin =

- Unincorporated community
- Location within Wisconsin Location within the United States
- Coordinates: 45°17′36″N 89°31′39″W
- Country: United States
- State: Wisconsin
- County: Lincoln
- Towns: Russell, Schley
- Elevation: 1,434 ft (437 m)
- Time zone: UTC-6 (Central (CST))
  - Summer (DST): UTC-5 (CDT)
- Area codes: 715 & 534
- GNIS feature ID: 1561937

Bloomville is an unincorporated community located in the towns of Russell and Schley, in Lincoln County, Wisconsin, United States.
