= Lincoln County, Wisconsin =

County in Wisconsin, United States

- County
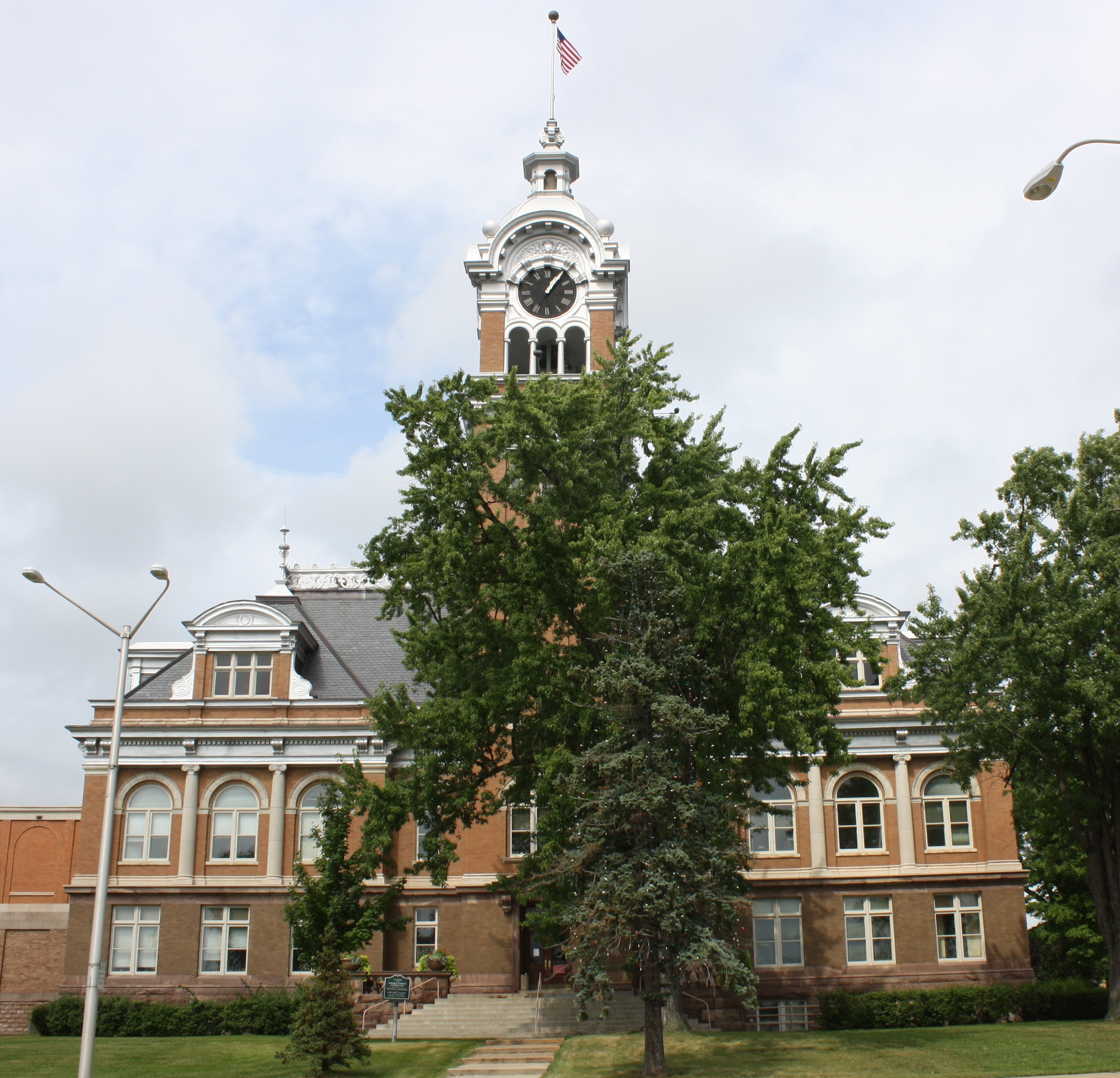
- Lincoln County Courthouse

- Location within the U.S. state of Wisconsin
- Coordinates: 45°20′N 89°44′W
- Country: United States
- State: Wisconsin
- Founded: 1875
- Named for: Abraham Lincoln
- Seat: Merrill
- Largest city: Merrill

Area
  - Total: 907 sq mi (2,350 km^{2})
  - Land: 879 sq mi (2,280 km^{2})
  - Water: 28 sq mi (73 km^{2}) 3.1%

Population (2020)
  - Total: 28,415
  - Estimate (2025): 28,403 ▼
  - Density: 32.3/sq mi (12.5/km^{2})
- Time zone: UTC−6 (Central)
  - Summer (DST): UTC−5 (CDT)
- Congressional district: 7th
- Website: www.co.lincoln.wi.us

Lincoln County is a county located in the U.S. state of Wisconsin. As of the 2020 census, the population was 28,415. Its county seat is Merrill. The county was created in 1875 and named after President Abraham Lincoln. Lincoln County comprises the Merrill, WI Micropolitan Statistical Area, which is also included in the Wausau–Stevens Point–Wisconsin Rapids, WI Combined Statistical Area.

== Geography ==
According to the U.S. Census Bureau, the county has a total area of 907 square miles (2,350 km^{2}), of which 879 square miles (2,280 km^{2}) is land and 28 square miles (73 km^{2}) (3.1%) is water.

=== Adjacent counties ===
- Oneida County – north
- Langlade County – east
- Marathon County – south
- Taylor County – west
- Price County – northwest

=== Major highways ===
- U.S. Highway 8
- U.S. Highway 51
- Highway 17 (Wisconsin)
- Highway 64 (Wisconsin)
- Highway 86 (Wisconsin)
- Highway 107 (Wisconsin)

=== Railroads ===
- Tomahawk Railway
- Watco

=== Airports ===
- KRRL – Merrill Municipal Airport
- KTKV – Tomahawk Regional Airport

== Demographics ==
Historical population
Census	Pop.	Note	%±
1880	2,011		—
1890	12,008		497.1%
1900	16,269		35.5%
1910	19,064		17.2%
1920	21,084		10.6%
1930	21,072		−0.1%
1940	22,536		6.9%
1950	22,235		−1.3%
1960	22,338		0.5%
1970	23,499		5.2%
1980	26,555		13.0%
1990	26,993		1.6%
2000	29,641		9.8%
2010	28,743		−3.0%
2020	28,415		−1.1%
2025 (est.)	28,403	▼	0.0%
U.S. Decennial Census; 1790–1960 1900–1990; 1990–2000 2010 2020

=== Racial and ethnic composition ===
Lincoln County, Wisconsin – Racial and ethnic composition Note: the US Census treats Hispanic/Latino as an ethnic category. This table excludes Latinos from the racial categories and assigns them to a separate category. Hispanics/Latinos may be of any race.
Race / ethnicity (NH = Non-Hispanic)	Pop 1980	Pop 1990	Pop 2000	Pop 2010	Pop 2020	% 1980	% 1990	% 2000	% 2010	% 2020
White alone (NH)	26,293	26,623	28,857	27,763	26,734	99.01%	98.63%	97.36%	96.59%	94.08%
Black or African American alone (NH)	24	79	119	152	148	0.09%	0.29%	0.40%	0.53%	0.52%
Native American or Alaska Native alone (NH)	70	89	120	89	108	0.26%	0.33%	0.40%	0.31%	0.38%
Asian alone (NH)	42	78	115	124	117	0.16%	0.29%	0.39%	0.43%	0.41%
Native Hawaiian or Pacific Islander alone (NH)	x	x	4	10	2	x	x	0.01%	0.03%	0.01%
Other race alone (NH)	32	6	6	14	35	0.12%	0.02%	0.02%	0.05%	0.12%
Mixed race or Multiracial (NH)	x	x	177	251	742	x	x	0.60%	0.87%	2.61%
Hispanic or Latino (any race)	94	118	243	340	529	0.35%	0.44%	0.82%	1.18%	1.86%
Total	26,555	26,993	29,641	28,743	28,415	100.00%	100.00%	100.00%	100.00%	100.00%

=== 2020 census ===
As of the 2020 census, the county had a population of 28,415. The population density was 32.3 people per square mile (12.5 people/km^{2}) and there were 16,034 housing units at an average density of 18.2 units per square mile (7.0 units/km^{2}). The median age was 48.9 years, 19.0% of residents were under the age of 18, and 23.6% of residents were 65 years of age or older. For every 100 females there were 100.5 males, and for every 100 females age 18 and over there were 99.9 males age 18 and over.

The racial makeup of the county was 94.7% White, 0.6% Black or African American, 0.4% American Indian and Alaska Native, 0.4% Asian, <0.1% Native Hawaiian and Pacific Islander, 0.6% from some other race, and 3.3% from two or more races. Hispanic or Latino residents of any race comprised 1.9% of the population.

33.5% of residents lived in urban areas, while 66.5% lived in rural areas.

There were 12,473 households in the county, of which 22.7% had children under the age of 18 living in them. Of all households, 50.7% were married-couple households, 20.0% were households with a male householder and no spouse or partner present, and 21.9% were households with a female householder and no spouse or partner present. About 30.7% of all households were made up of individuals and 14.5% had someone living alone who was 65 years of age or older.

Of those housing units, 22.2% were vacant. Among occupied housing units, 76.4% were owner-occupied and 23.6% were renter-occupied. The homeowner vacancy rate was 1.8% and the rental vacancy rate was 7.3%.

=== 2000 census ===
2000 Census age pyramid for Lincoln County

As of the census of 2000, there were 29,641 people, 11,721 households, and 8,228 families residing in the county. The population density was 34 people per square mile (13 people/km^{2}). There were 14,681 housing units at an average density of 17 units per square mile (6.6 units/km^{2}). The racial makeup of the county was 97.76% White, 0.41% Black or African American, 0.44% Native American, 0.39% Asian, 0.03% Pacific Islander, 0.29% from other races, and 0.68% from two or more races. 0.82% of the population were Hispanic or Latino of any race. 55.9% were of German, 5.7% Polish and 5.3% Norwegian ancestry. 96.9% spoke English, 1.3% German and 1.2% Spanish as their first language.

There were 11,721 households, out of which 31.4% had children under the age of 18 living with them, 58.4% were married couples living together, 8.1% had a female householder with no husband present, and 29.8% were non-families. 25.5% of all households were made up of individuals, and 12.1% had someone living alone who was 65 years of age or older. The average household size was 2.46 and the average family size was 2.94.

In the county, the population was spread out, with 25.4% under the age of 18, 6.9% from 18 to 24, 28% from 25 to 44, 23.3% from 45 to 64, and 16.4% who were 65 years of age or older. The median age was 39 years. For every 100 females there were 99.9 males. For every 100 females age 18 and over, there were 95.1 males.

In 2017, there were 270 births, giving a general fertility rate of 62.6 births per 1000 women aged 15–44, the 34th lowest rate out of all 72 Wisconsin counties.

== Communities ==
=== Cities ===
- Merrill (county seat)
- Tomahawk

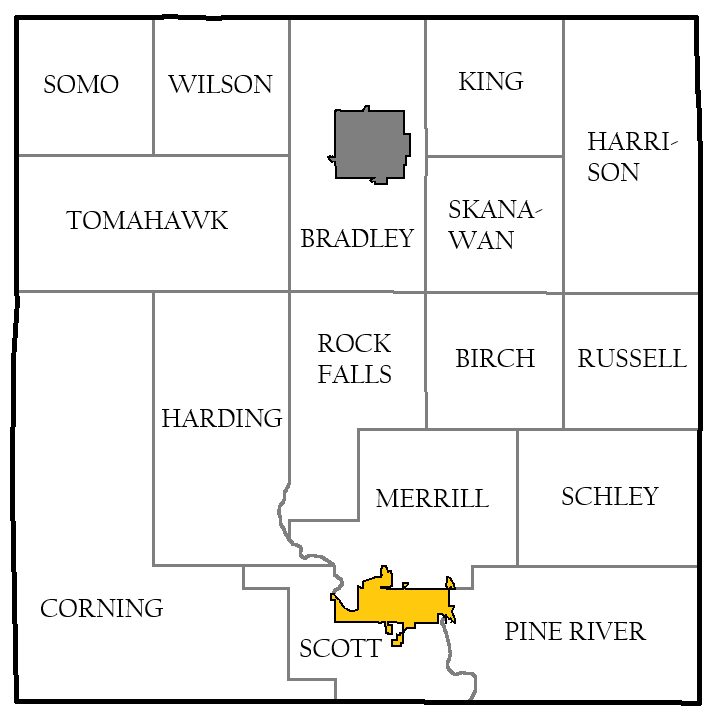
Towns of Lincoln County

=== Towns ===
- Birch
- Bradley
- Corning
- Harding
- Harrison
- King
- Merrill
- Pine River
- Rock Falls
- Russell
- Schley
- Scott
- Skanawan
- Somo
- Tomahawk
- Wilson

=== Unincorporated communities ===
- Bloomville
- Bradley
- Bundy
- Clifford (partial)
- Doering
- Dudley
- Dutch Corners
- Gilbert
- Gleason
- Harrison
- Heafford Junction
- Irma
- Jeffris
- McCord (partial)
- Otis
- Pine River
- Spirit Falls
- Tripoli (partial)
- West Kraft

== Politics ==
United States presidential election results for Lincoln County, Wisconsin
Year	Republican		Democratic		Third party(ies)	
Year	No.	%	No.	%	No.	%
1892	997	34.17%	1,443	49.45%	478	16.38%
1896	1,706	47.69%	1,802	50.38%	69	1.93%
1900	2,147	56.71%	1,552	40.99%	87	2.30%
1904	2,850	70.39%	1,004	24.80%	195	4.82%
1908	2,308	53.89%	1,813	42.33%	162	3.78%
1912	712	21.20%	1,760	52.41%	886	26.38%
1916	2,189	60.69%	1,282	35.54%	136	3.77%
1920	3,713	72.11%	838	16.28%	598	11.61%
1924	1,857	26.84%	503	7.27%	4,558	65.89%
1928	4,025	56.06%	3,091	43.05%	64	0.89%
1932	2,958	35.76%	5,093	61.57%	221	2.67%
1936	3,120	33.83%	5,520	59.86%	582	6.31%
1940	5,812	58.21%	3,951	39.57%	221	2.21%
1944	5,564	64.71%	2,938	34.17%	96	1.12%
1948	4,339	54.97%	3,368	42.67%	187	2.37%
1952	6,877	68.72%	3,092	30.90%	38	0.38%
1956	6,329	67.74%	2,880	30.83%	134	1.43%
1960	6,147	60.93%	3,909	38.75%	33	0.33%
1964	3,894	39.75%	5,883	60.06%	19	0.19%
1968	4,793	51.37%	3,858	41.35%	679	7.28%
1972	6,206	57.25%	4,175	38.51%	459	4.23%
1976	5,672	48.38%	5,800	49.48%	251	2.14%
1980	6,473	50.75%	5,438	42.63%	844	6.62%
1984	6,682	55.08%	5,353	44.12%	97	0.80%
1988	5,257	47.03%	5,819	52.06%	102	0.91%
1992	4,321	32.48%	5,297	39.82%	3,686	27.71%
1996	4,076	33.28%	6,166	50.35%	2,004	16.36%
2000	6,727	47.24%	6,664	46.80%	848	5.96%
2004	8,024	51.11%	7,484	47.67%	192	1.22%
2008	6,519	42.70%	8,424	55.17%	325	2.13%
2012	7,455	48.99%	7,563	49.70%	198	1.30%
2016	8,401	57.10%	5,371	36.51%	940	6.39%
2020	10,017	60.72%	6,261	37.95%	219	1.33%
2024	10,633	61.79%	6,306	36.64%	270	1.57%

Between 1964 and 2016, Lincoln County supported the nationwide winner in every election except for 1988. In 2020, Donald Trump received the highest share of the vote for any candidate in the county since 1960 and won by an even bigger margin in 2024, possibly indicating that this bellwether has shifted to the right.

== See also ==
- National Register of Historic Places listings in Lincoln County, Wisconsin
