= Irma, Wisconsin =

- Unincorporated community
- Location within Wisconsin Location within the United States
- Coordinates: 45°21′05″N 89°39′59″W
- Country: United States
- State: Wisconsin
- County: Lincoln
- Town: Birch
- Elevation: 1,529 ft (466 m)
- Time zone: UTC-6 (Central (CST))
  - Summer (DST): UTC-5 (CDT)
- ZIP code: 54442
- Area codes: 715 & 534
- GNIS feature ID: 1566960

Irma is an unincorporated community in Lincoln County, Wisconsin, United States. Irma is located on U.S. Route 51, 14 miles (23 km) north of Merrill, in the town of Birch. Irma has a post office with ZIP code 54442.

Irma is the location of the Lincoln Hills and Copper Lake Schools, Wisconsin's two juvenile detention facilities.

== Notable people ==
- Einar H. Ingman, Jr., Medal of Honor recipient, lived in Irma.
