= National Register of Historic Places listings in Lincoln County, Wisconsin =

Location of Lincoln County in Wisconsin

Lincoln County, Wisconsin, has six properties and districts listed on the National Register of Historic Places.

The locations of National Register properties for which the latitude and longitude coordinates are included below may be seen in a map.

This National Park Service list is complete through NPS recent listings posted September 4, 2026.

== Current listings ==
	Name on the Register	Image	Date listed	Location	City or town	Description
1	Center Avenue Historic District	Center Avenue Historic District	June 17, 1994 (#94000600)	Roughly bounded by Cedar, Park, Third, Center and Seventh Sts. 45°11′06″N 89°40′56″W	Merrill	Homes built as early as the late 1800s in various styles: Italianate, Queen Anne, Colonial Revival, and Prairie Style.
2	First Street Bridge	First Street Bridge	September 12, 1996 (#96001017)	1st St. spanning the Prairie River; 45°10′44″N 89°42′12″W	Merrill	Three-arch stone bridge built in 1904 of granite rubble by Fred Hesterman. It is the only such bridge left in Wisconsin.
3	Lincoln County Courthouse	Lincoln County Courthouse	April 19, 1978 (#78000116)	1110 E. Main St. 45°10′52″N 89°41′02″W	Merrill	Beaux-Arts courthouse designed by Van Ryn & DeGelleke and built in 1903.
4	Merrill City Hall	Merrill City Hall	July 12, 1978 (#78000117)	717 E. 2nd St. 45°10′49″N 89°41′23″W	Merrill	Former city hall, constructed in 1889 in Queen Anne style. Now apartments.
5	Merrill Post Office	Merrill Post Office	October 24, 2000 (#00001258)	430 E. Second St. 45°10′53″N 89°41′37″W	Merrill	Neoclassical building with octagonal skylight, built in 1915.
6	T.B. Scott Free Library	T.B. Scott Free Library	January 21, 1974 (#74000096)	106 W. 1st St. 45°10′47″N 89°42′05″W	Merrill	Established in 1891 by Thomas Blythe Scott, lumberman and legislator. First public library in Wisconsin to offer English classes for immigrants. Part of the current building was built in 1911 with a Carnegie grant.

== See also ==
- List of National Historic Landmarks in Wisconsin
- National Register of Historic Places listings in Wisconsin
- Listings in neighboring counties: Langlade, Marathon, Oneida, Price, Taylor
