= First Street Bridge =

First Street Bridge may refer to:

- First Street Bridge (Napa, California), listed on the National Register of Historic Places in Napa County, California
- First Street Bridge (Merrill, Wisconsin), listed on the National Register of Historic Places in Lincoln County, Wisconsin
- Asylum Bridge, listed on the National Register of Historic Places in Miami County, Kansas
