= Hatley, Wisconsin =

- Village
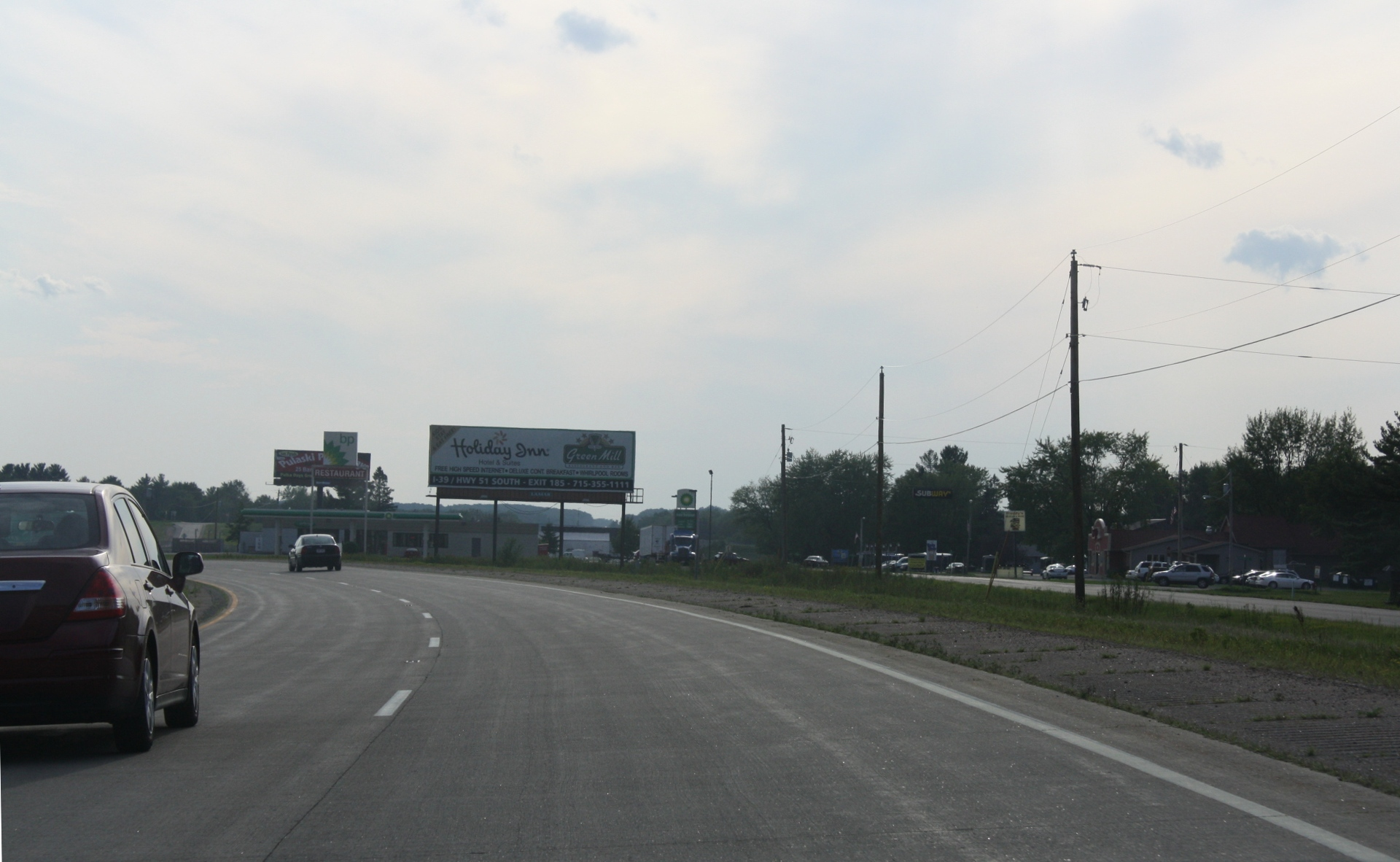
- Looking west at Hatley along WIS 29

- Location of Hatley in Marathon County, Wisconsin.
- Coordinates: 44°53′11″N 89°20′23″W
- Country: United States
- State: Wisconsin
- County: Marathon

Area
  - Total: 0.98 sq mi (2.53 km^{2})
  - Land: 0.98 sq mi (2.53 km^{2})
  - Water: 0 sq mi (0.00 km^{2})
- Elevation: 1,270 ft (387 m)

Population (2020)
  - Total: 648
  - Density: 663/sq mi (256/km^{2})
- Time zone: UTC-6 (Central (CST))
  - Summer (DST): UTC-5 (CDT)
- ZIP Code: 54440
- Area codes: 715 & 534
- FIPS code: 55-33175
- GNIS feature ID: 1566132
- Website: Village of Hatley

Hatley is a village in Marathon County, Wisconsin, United States. It is part of the Wausau, Wisconsin Metropolitan Statistical Area. The population was 648 at the 2020 census.

== History ==
A post office called Hatley has been in operation since 1881. The village was named after Hatley, Quebec, the former hometown of an early settler.

== Geography ==
Hatley is located at 44°53′11″N 89°20′23″W (44.886377, -89.339605).

According to the United States Census Bureau, the village has a total area of 1.05 square miles (2.72 km^{2}), all land.

== Demographics ==
Historical population
Census	Pop.	Note	%±
1920	290		—
1930	251		−13.4%
1940	270		7.6%
1950	299		10.7%
1960	306		2.3%
1970	315		2.9%
1980	300		−4.8%
1990	295		−1.7%
2000	476		61.4%
2010	574		20.6%
2020	648		12.9%
U.S. Decennial Census

=== 2010 census ===
As of the census of 2010, there were 574 people, 223 households, and 160 families living in the village. The population density was 546.7 inhabitants per square mile (211.1/km^{2}). There were 233 housing units at an average density of 221.9 per square mile (85.7/km^{2}). The racial makeup of the village was 94.9% White, 0.2% African American, 2.6% Native American, 1.0% Asian, 0.3% Pacific Islander, 0.2% from other races, and 0.7% from two or more races. Hispanic or Latino of any race were 2.4% of the population.

There were 223 households, of which 34.1% had children under the age of 18 living with them, 60.1% were married couples living together, 6.7% had a female householder with no husband present, 4.9% had a male householder with no wife present, and 28.3% were non-families. 20.2% of all households were made up of individuals, and 5.8% had someone living alone who was 65 years of age or older. The average household size was 2.57 and the average family size was 3.00.

The median age in the village was 34.3 years. 26.3% of residents were under the age of 18; 7.6% were between the ages of 18 and 24; 34.3% were from 25 to 44; 20.2% were from 45 to 64; and 11.7% were 65 years of age or older. The gender makeup of the village was 53.1% male and 46.9% female.

=== 2000 census ===
As of the census of 2000, there were 476 people, 185 households, and 133 families living in the village. The population density was 532.6 people per square mile (206.5/km^{2}). There were 193 housing units at an average density of 216.0 per square mile (83.7/km^{2}). The racial makeup of the village was 97.48% White, 1.47% Native American, 0.21% Asian, and 0.84% from two or more races.

There were 185 households, out of which 34.6% had children under the age of 18 living with them, 61.6% were married couples living together, 5.4% had a female householder with no husband present, and 28.1% were non-families. 19.5% of all households were made up of individuals, and 8.6% had someone living alone who was 65 years of age or older. The average household size was 2.57 and the average family size was 2.97.

In the village, the population was spread out, with 26.3% under the age of 18, 10.3% from 18 to 24, 34.9% from 25 to 44, 16.4% from 45 to 64, and 12.2% who were 65 years of age or older. The median age was 31 years. For every 100 females, there were 104.3 males. For every 100 females age 18 and over, there were 105.3 males.

The median income for a household in the village was $47,875, and the median income for a family was $48,125. Males had a median income of $32,917 versus $24,861 for females. The per capita income for the village was $20,373. About 4.2% of families and 4.7% of the population were below the poverty line, including 3.1% of those under age 18 and 12.7% of those age 65 or over.

== Education ==
=== Hatley Library ===
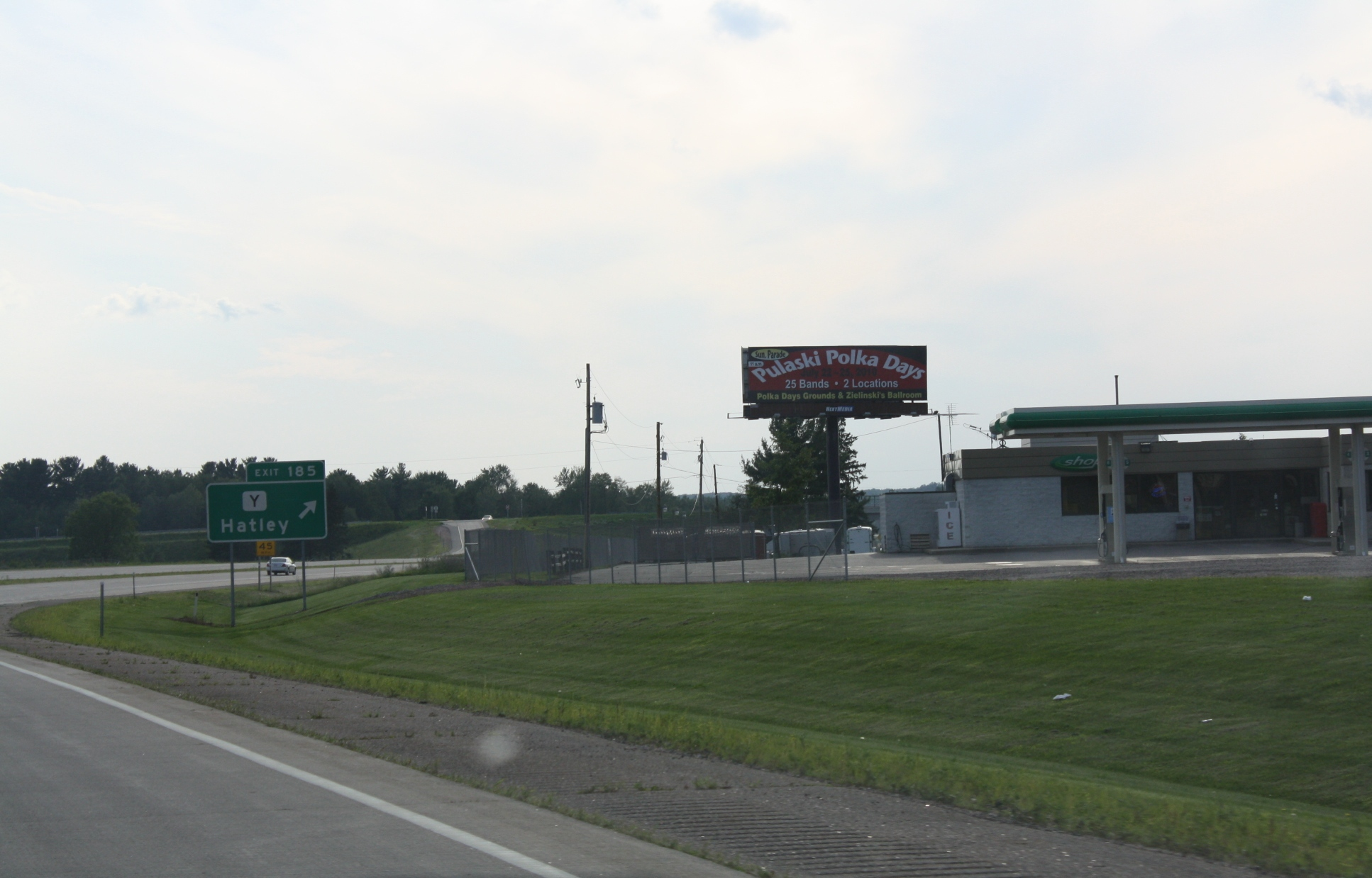
Sign on WIS 29

The Hatley Library is a part of the Marathon County Public Library (MCPL), a network of nine public libraries throughout Marathon County, Wisconsin. Under the auspices of MCPL, the Hatley Library (a.k.a. "MCPL Hatley") is also a member of the Wisconsin Valley Library Service, one of 17 state-level library consortia in Wisconsin.

In June 2005, the Hatley Branch Library and the Community/Senior Center opened its doors to serve eastern Marathon County, including Bevent, Elderon, Hatley, Norrie, Reid, and Ringle.

Hatley Branch Library is the newest member of the Marathon County Public Library system and offers all available library services. The community center is composed of a multi-purpose room, meeting room, offices and kitchen, and is used for area events, meetings and is available for general public use.

=== Hatley Elementary ===
The Hatley Elementary School, part of the DC Everest School District, serves kindergarten through 5th grade with one class per grade.
