= Edgar, Wisconsin =

Village of Edgar, Wisconsin
- Village
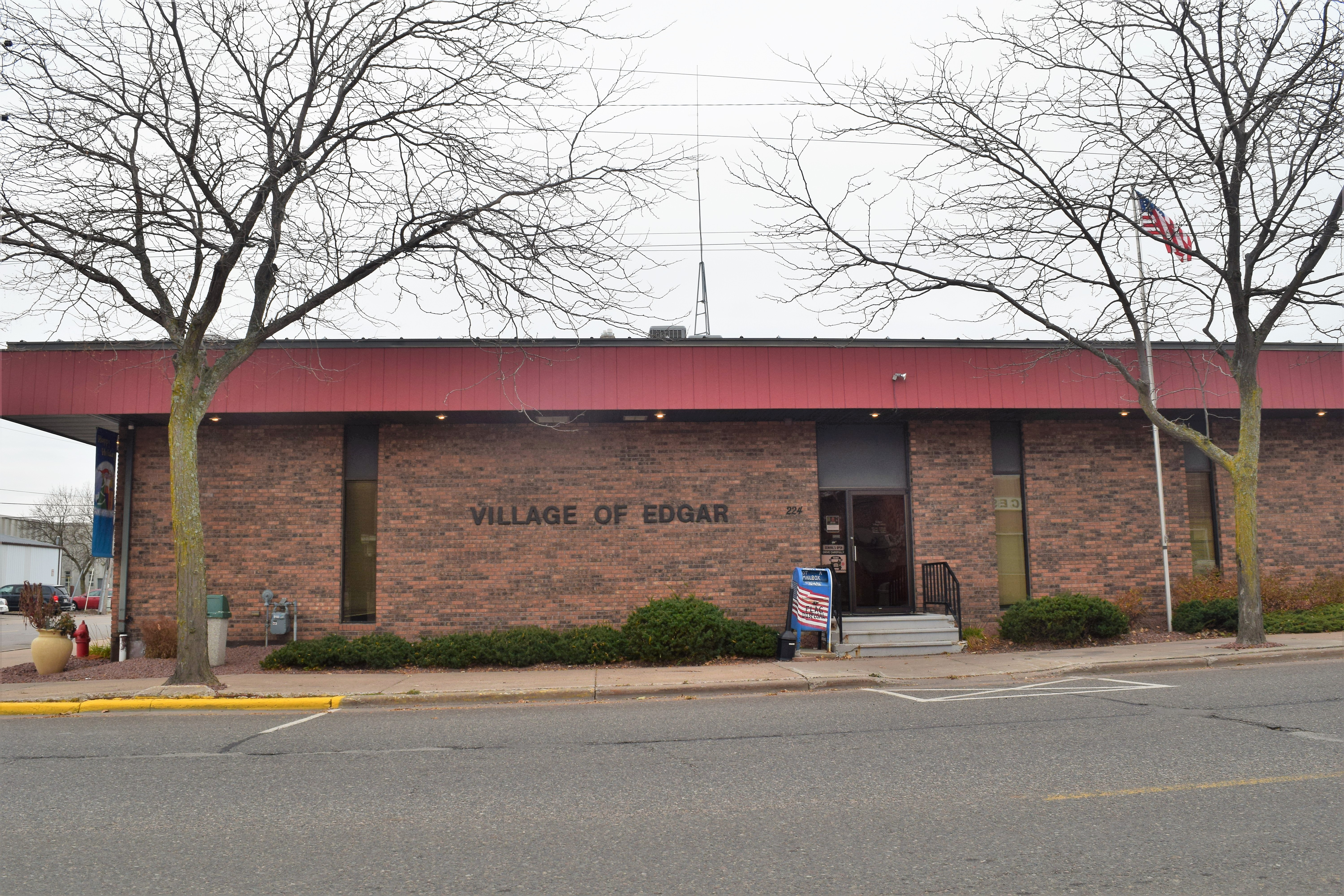
- Edgar Village Hall

- Location of Edgar in Marathon County, Wisconsin.
- Coordinates: 44°55′26″N 89°57′53″W
- Country: United States
- State: Wisconsin
- County: Marathon

Area
  - Total: 1.81 sq mi (4.68 km^{2})
  - Land: 1.81 sq mi (4.68 km^{2})
  - Water: 0 sq mi (0.00 km^{2})
- Elevation: 1,289 ft (393 m)

Population (2020)
  - Total: 1,439
  - Density: 796/sq mi (307/km^{2})
- Time zone: UTC-6 (Central (CST))
  - Summer (DST): UTC-5 (CDT)
- Area codes: 715 & 534
- FIPS code: 55-22550
- GNIS feature ID: 1564442
- Website: vil.edgar.wi.us

Edgar is a village in Marathon County, Wisconsin, United States. It is part of the Wausau, Wisconsin Metropolitan Statistical Area. The population was 1,439 at the 2020 census. Edgar has maintained Tree City USA standing since 1995.

== History ==
Edgar was platted in 1891 by the railroad. It was named for William Edgar, a local landowner and owner of a sawmill.

== Geography ==
Edgar is located at 44°55′26″N 89°57′53″W (44.923757, -89.964659).

According to the United States Census Bureau, the village has a total area of 1.81 square miles (4.69 km^{2}), all land.

== Demographics ==
Historical population
Census	Pop.	Note	%±
1900	478		—
1910	746		56.1%
1920	723		−3.1%
1930	667		−7.7%
1940	694		4.0%
1950	705		1.6%
1960	803		13.9%
1970	928		15.6%
1980	1,194		28.7%
1990	1,318		10.4%
2000	1,386		5.2%
2010	1,479		6.7%
2020	1,439		−2.7%
U.S. Decennial Census

=== 2010 census ===
As of the census of 2010, there were 1,479 people, 597 households, and 414 families living in the village. The population density was 817.1 inhabitants per square mile (315.5/km^{2}). There were 635 housing units at an average density of 350.8 per square mile (135.4/km^{2}). The racial makeup of the village was 97.4% White, 0.4% African American, 0.4% Native American, 0.2% Asian, 0.2% Pacific Islander, 0.7% from other races, and 0.6% from two or more races. Hispanic or Latino of any race were 2.0% of the population.

There were 597 households, of which 35.3% had children under the age of 18 living with them, 55.6% were married couples living together, 8.0% had a female householder with no husband present, 5.7% had a male householder with no wife present, and 30.7% were non-families. 27.0% of all households were made up of individuals, and 10.4% had someone living alone who was 65 years of age or older. The average household size was 2.48 and the average family size was 3.01.

The median age in the village was 37.3 years. 27.7% of residents were under the age of 18; 6.8% were between the ages of 18 and 24; 26.6% were from 25 to 44; 24.6% were from 45 to 64; and 14.3% were 65 years of age or older. The gender makeup of the village was 49.3% male and 50.7% female.

=== 2000 census ===
As of the census of 2000, there were 1,386 people, 542 households, and 377 families living in the village. The population density was 837.0 people per square mile (322.4/km^{2}). There were 568 housing units at an average density of 343.0 per square mile (132.1/km^{2}). The racial makeup of the village was 98.92% White, 0.14% African American, 0.22% Native American, 0.22% Asian, 0.14% from other races, and 0.36% from two or more races. Hispanic or Latino of any race were 0.14% of the population.

There were 542 households, out of which 35.8% had children under the age of 18 living with them, 57.7% were married couples living together, 7.4% had a female householder with no husband present, and 30.4% were non-families. 25.1% of all households were made up of individuals, and 11.4% had someone living alone who was 65 years of age or older. The average household size was 2.56 and the average family size was 3.10.

In the village, the population was spread out, with 26.8% under the age of 18, 8.3% from 18 to 24, 30.7% from 25 to 44, 20.3% from 45 to 64, and 13.9% who were 65 years of age or older. The median age was 35 years. For every 100 females, there were 98.3 males. For every 100 females age 18 and over, there were 96.5 males.

The median income for a household in the village was $40,759, and the median income for a family was $51,250. Males had a median income of $32,569 versus $22,426 for females. The per capita income for the village was $21,605. About 4.0% of families and 4.3% of the population were below the poverty line, including 3.6% of those under age 18 and 10.2% of those age 65 or over.

== Notable people ==
- Rocky Sekorski, former heavyweight boxer
- Frank J. Shortner, Wisconsin businessman, legislator, and President of the Village of Edgar, lived in Edgar.

== Education ==
=== Edgar Library ===
The Edgar library is a part of the Marathon County Public Library (MCPL), a network of nine public libraries throughout Marathon County, Wisconsin. Under the auspices of MCPL, the Edgar library (aka "MCPL Edgar") is also considered a member of the Wisconsin Valley Library Service, one of 17 state-level library systems in Wisconsin.

In 1928, the Edgar Women's Club obtained books from the Wisconsin Traveling Library and this functioned as the local library until 1946. In 1948 preschool storytimes began at the library. As the County Library grew and provided more services to the branch libraries, the village stepped in to provide building space so that the public would have a larger library to enjoy.

In 1973 the Edgar Library became a branch library of the newly formed Marathon County Public Library when the Wausau Public Library and Marathon County Library merged.

The county-wide building program funded the remodeling of the former Edgar Bank in 1994, giving the public more books, computers and more space for family and children's programs.
