= Paul Gebert Sr. =

American politician

Paul Gebert Sr. (October 10, 1870 – January 21, 1963) was an American politician and businessman.

Born in Magdeburg, Germany, Gebert had emigrated with his parents to the United States in 1882 and had settled in Wausau, Wisconsin. He had gone to a Business college and was involved with the flour mill and feed business. While, in Wausau, Wisconsin, Gebert was President of the Northern Milling Company. In 1909, Gebert and his family moved to Merrill, Wisconsin where Gebert started the Lincoln Milling Company. In 1922, Gebert retired. He served on the Lincoln County, Wisconsin Board of Supervisors and was a Republican. In 1929, Gebert served in the Wisconsin State Assembly. Gebert died in Merrill, Wisconsin in 1963 at age 92.
