= James H. Hamlin =

American politician

James H. Hamlin (November 3, 1875 – September 21, 1953) was a member of the Wisconsin State Assembly.

He was born in Mount Morris, Wisconsin. He moved with his family to Merrill, Wisconsin in 1883. On June 1, 1904, Hamlin married Alta Tarr. They had two children.

== Career ==
Hamlin was elected to the Assembly in 1942. Additionally, he was Clerk of Merrill and Lincoln County, Wisconsin Superintendent of Schools. He was a Republican.
