= John O'Day (Wisconsin politician) =

American politician

John O'Day (June 28, 1856 – December 28, 1933) was an American businessman and politician.

Born in England, O'Day emigrated to the United States in 1857 and lived in New York. In 1860, they settled on a farm in Grand Rapids, Wisconsin. He went to public school. O'Day then lived in Merrill, Wisconsin. He was in the lumber, logging, railroad, and paper business. O'Day served as mayor of Merrill, Wisconsin. From 1911 to 1915, O'Day served in the Wisconsin State Assembly and was a Democrat. O'Day died at his fruit farm, and winter home, in Reedley, California.
