= Merrill Municipal Airport =

Airport in Wisconsin, United States

- IATA: RRL; ICAO: KRRL; FAA LID: RRL

Summary
- Airport type: Public
- Owner: City of Merrill
- Serves: Merrill, Wisconsin
- Opened: February 1938
- Time zone: CST (UTC−06:00)
  - Summer (DST): CDT (UTC−05:00)
- Elevation AMSL: 1,318 ft (402 m)
- Coordinates: 45°11′56″N 089°42′46″W

Map
- Location of airport in Wisconsin RRL (the United States)

Runways
Direction	Length		Surface
Direction	ft	m	Surface
7/25	5,100	1,554	Asphalt
16/34	2,997	913	Asphalt

Statistics
- Aircraft operations (2023): 18,710
- Based aircraft (2024): 47
- Source: Federal Aviation Administration

Merrill Municipal Airport (IATA: RRL, ICAO: KRRL, FAA LID: RRL) is a city owned public use airport located one nautical mile (2 km) northwest of the central business district of Merrill, a city in Lincoln County, Wisconsin, United States. It is included in the Federal Aviation Administration (FAA) National Plan of Integrated Airport Systems for 2025–2029, in which it is categorized as a local general aviation facility.

== Facilities and aircraft ==
Merrill Municipal Airport covers an area of 439 acres (178 ha) at an elevation of 1,318 feet (402 m) above mean sea level. It has two runways with asphalt surfaces: the primary runway 7/25 is 5,100 by 75 feet (1,554 x 23 m) with approved GPS approaches and the crosswind runway 16/34 is 2,997 by 75 feet (913 x 23 m). The Merrill NDB navaid, (RRL) frequency 257 kHz, is located on the field.

For the 12-month period ending June 22, 2023, the airport had 18,710 aircraft operations, an average of 51 per day: 96% general aviation, 4% air taxi and less than 1% military.

In August 2024, there were 47 aircraft based at this airport: 44 single-engine, 2 multi-engine and 1 jet.

== See also ==
- List of airports in Wisconsin
