= Marathon County Public Library =

Public library in Wisconsin

Coordinates: 44.959652°N 89.630887°W

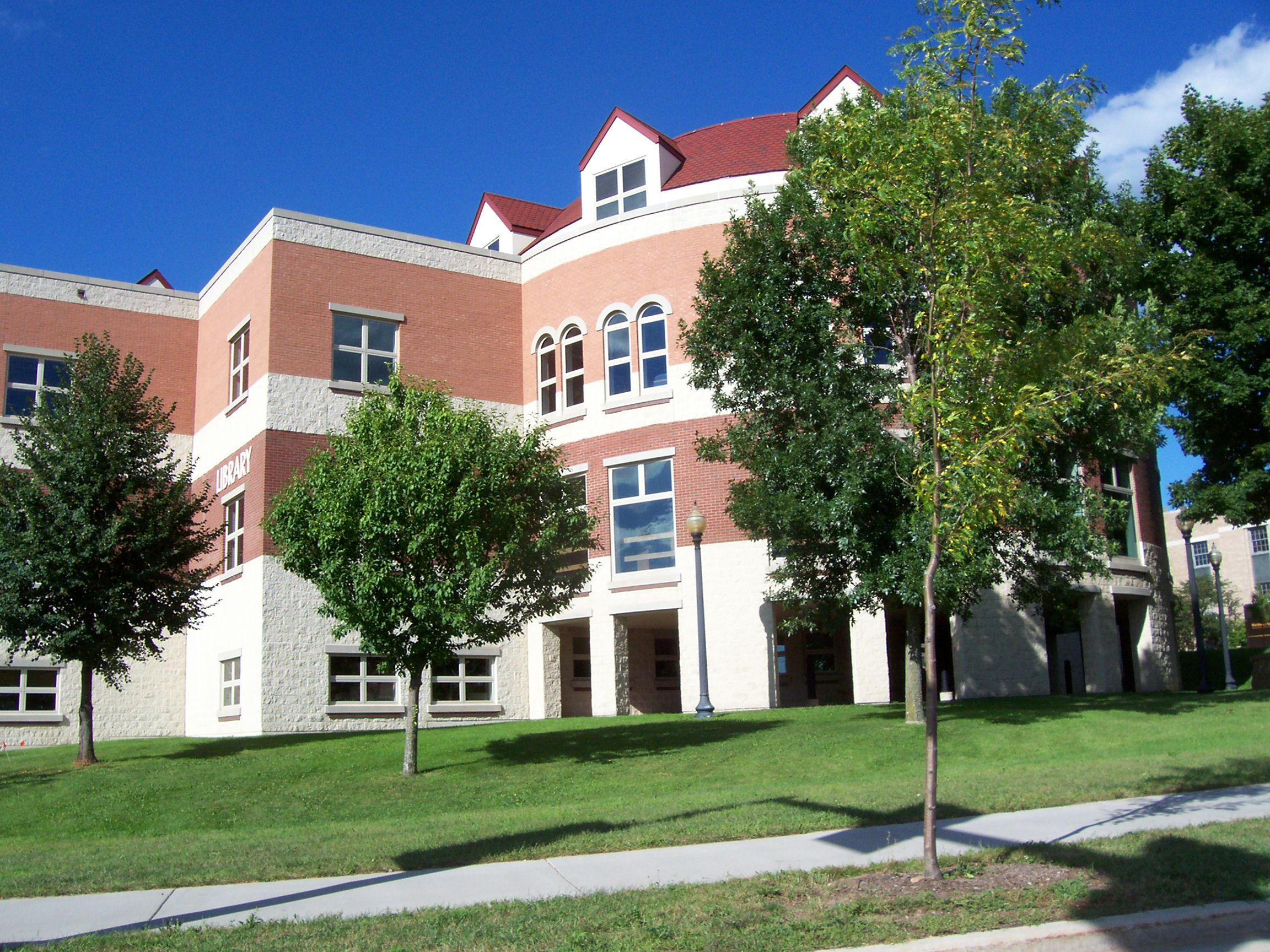
The Marathon County Public Library - Wausau Headquarters

The Marathon County Public Library (MCPL) is a consolidated county library with nine locations in Marathon County, Wisconsin, United States. Its headquarters are in Wausau. The library has its origins in the Wausau Free Public Library, which was founded in April 1907.

== Overview ==
The Marathon County Public Library's headquarters, sometimes called simply the "Wausau library," is located at 300 North First Street in Wausau. MCPL has branches in Athens, Edgar, Hatley, Marathon City, Mosinee, Rothschild, Spencer, and Stratford. As of 2019, it served a population of 135,692, with 74,268 active library card-holders in Marathon County alone. Its collection contains 313,008 books, 29,703 audio and video materials, 607 magazine and newspaper titles in print, access to thousands of magazines and newspapers electronically, and 247 art prints.

The Marathon County Public Library operates in cooperation with the Wisconsin Valley Library Service (WVLS), a state library system of 25 public libraries and more than 200 non-public libraries.

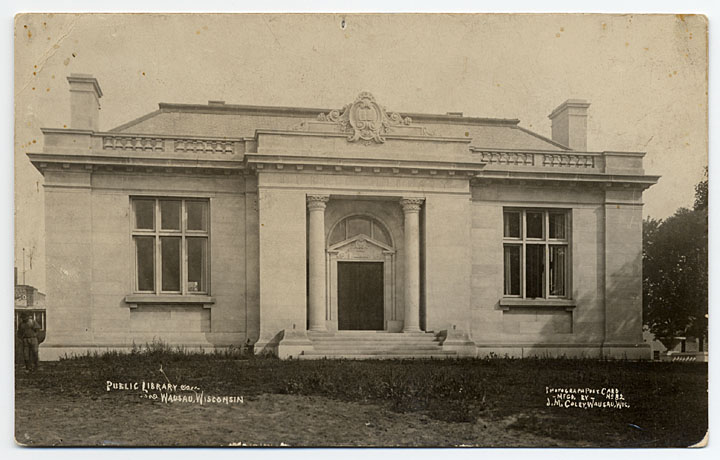
Wausau Free Public Library upon opening in 1907

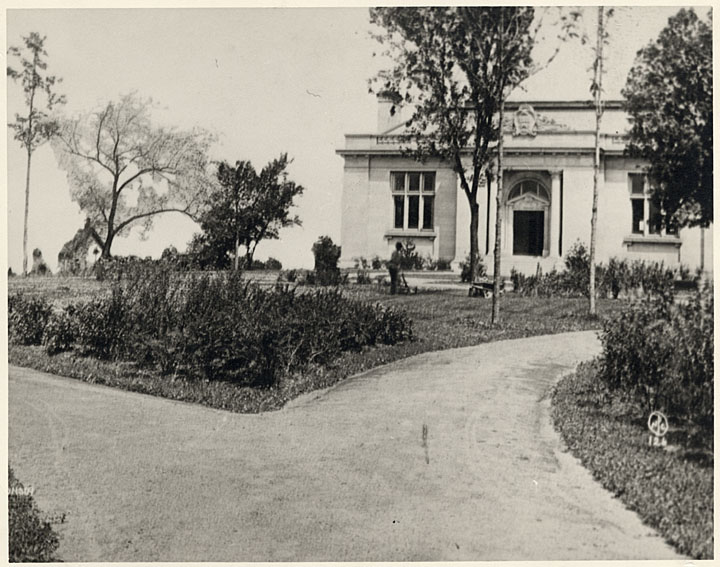
Wausau Free Public Library, 1910

== History ==
=== Early years ===
The first library in Wausau was formed in 1871 by the Pine Knot Literary Society, a men's literary club. The club had more than 700 books, some purchased and others donated by club members. The library was kept in the offices of the Wisconsin River Pilot newspaper. Residents could purchase a membership to the club and the right to check out books for $3 per year or 25 cents per week. In 1879, the Pine Knot Literary Society donated its library to the Ladies Literary Club of Wausau, who managed the collection under the same subscription arrangement until 1897, when the Wausau Free Public Library was established. At this time, the city of Wausau agreed to appropriate five percent of its license fees each year (between $600 and $1,750) to purchase books for the library. Around this time, the library was moved to the second floor of the courthouse. where it remained, rent free, for three years by arrangement with the Marathon County Board.

By 1904, the library collection had moved several times – from the basement of a bank to a store building – and had no permanent home. On July 5, 1904, the Wausau City Council adopted a resolution to accept a gift of $25,000 from steel magnate and philanthropist Andrew Carnegie to construct a library building. The following year Walter and Sarah Alexander donated the land from Walter's uncle, Walter McIndoe's, homestead to the city to use as a park and location for the library building. On July 11, 1905, the library board accepted plans designed by architect George W. Maher and began construction.

=== Carnegie Building (1907) ===
The library's new 3,402 square foot building opened on April 3, 1907. It held 4,968 books and served 4,785 registered users. The first librarian was Nellie Silverthorn, daughter of Willis C. Silverthorn, a founding member of the Pine Knot Literary Society.

By 1912, 50,427 books were borrowed in the previous year from the Wausau Public Library by 5,788 patrons. The library held 7,976 books.

In 1925, Walter Alexander donated more land for the library and park, allowing space for the library to expand, under the condition that the land be used only for the library and public park.

=== Parcher Addition (1929) ===
By the 1920s, the library was overcrowded. In its 1923 report, the library stated that it circulated 114,492 books and held 54,634 books in its collection. The library board voted to put a 4,187 square foot addition onto the library, increasing the square footage to 15,200 square feet. The addition also provided a community room with space for 300 people, committee meeting rooms and a kitchen. The money for the $80,000 addition came from the estate of Mary Single Parcher, whose will had established the Parcher Welfare Fund, to be used in a manner "most likely to promote the pleasure and happiness of the city of Wausau". The addition was dedicated on April 12, 1929.

=== Formation of Marathon County Library and Bookmobiles (1937) ===
In 1937, the Marathon County Library was established as a Works Progress Administration (WPA) project to make library services available throughout the county, not just Wausau. It operated out of the Wausau Public Library for several years before moving to the Marathon County Courthouse Annex in 1951. In 1948 the Marathon County Library had a $5,000 budget and was given a $5,000 appropriate to purchase a bookmobile. The county library operated the bookmobiles and all community libraries except the Wausau Public Library and the Joseph Dessert Library in Mosinee. The library operated 15 library stations in the county, including in the communities of Athens, Brokaw, Edgar, Marathon, Norrie, Rothschild, Spencer, Stratford, Unity, Halder, Radar Base (in the Town of Harrison), Gad Community Center (Town of Bern), Cherokee (Town of Hull), and Mount View Sanitorium and the Nurses' Home.

In 1953, the county owned 33,000 books and circulation was 317,873, up from 290,766 in 1952. By the 1960s, that number had doubled. In 1969, the county library owned 99,628 books and circulation was 1,399,830.

The first bookmobile in Marathon County was purchased in 1949 and held 3,000 books. The bookmobile made a circuit around the county every five weeks. The library purchased a second bookmobile in 1961.

=== 1968 Addition ===
Between 1929 and 1969, the number of borrowers at the Wausau Public Library doubled each decade and the auditorium and kitchen were reappropriated for bookshelves and programming areas. By 1966, the library again was overcrowded. In 1965, the library held more than 87,000 books and served more than 23,000 people. On May 10, 1966, the Wausau City Council approved a $589,000 addition to the library. The city borrowed $415,000, $193,000 came from a federal grant, and $30,000 was raised through private donations. The 29,860 square foot addition made it the largest library in the county.

=== Consolidation (1974) ===
By 1972, the Wausau Public Library had a collection of 247,255 books and the Marathon County Library had 132,669. The county had inadequate facilities and the majority of Wausau Library patrons were not residents of the city. On September 20, 1972, Edward Fromm, president of the Marathon County Library Board approached Robert See, president of the Wausau Public Library Board, about merging the two libraries. The first meeting of the joint boards occurred on November 1, 1972, and the Marathon County Board and the Wausau City Council approved the merger in 1973. On January 1, 1974, the Marathon County Library and the Wausau Public Library merged to form the Marathon County Public Library and all library operations moved to the Wausau Public Library building.

=== Renovations ===
After about 75 years, the original Wausau library building was falling into disrepair. The building had cracked plaster, leaking roofs, drafty spaces and rotting rafters. In 1990, the library closed for two weeks for asbestos removal. The Wausau City Council and the Marathon County Board agreed that the library needed to be repaired, but could not agree on how to pay for the project. On February 11, 1992, the Wausau Common Council Committee of the Whole approved a plan in which the city would build the new library on the grounds of the existing building and lease it back to the county to recoup costs. On August 25, 1993, the city broke ground on the new library. The project cost $5.3 million and the costs were split between the city of Wausau and Marathon County. The new library opened on January 3, 1995.

=== Current ===
The Wausau Public Library received the Library of the Year Award from the Wisconsin Library Association in 1965, and again in 1997 as the Marathon County Public Library.

In 2005, a branch library was built in Hatley. Bookmobiles were retired that year as well.
