= Wausau Homes =

Wausau Homes, Inc.
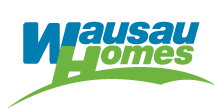
- Type: Private
- Industry: Home construction
- Founded: 1960
- Headquarters: Rothschild, Wisconsin
- Areas served: Wisconsin, Minnesota, Michigan, Illinois, Indiana, Iowa, Missouri, North Dakota
- Key people: Earl Schuette (Co-founder); Cliff Schuette (Co-founder); Marvin C. Schuette (Co-founder); Tom Schuette (Former Owner); Jay Schuette (Owner)
- Products: Custom Homes, Panelized Homes, Single Family Homes
- Number of employees: 60
- Website: www.wausauhomes.com

Wausau Homes is a custom, new home construction company in the United States.

== History ==
Schuette Brothers Original Sawmill

- The 1930s - 40's - In 1935, Earl Schuette purchased a milk route with his brother Cliff, once their deliveries were finished in the morning they were looking for other ways to keep busy. With the extra time on their hands in the afternoons, the brother invested in a sawmill, and began cutting lumber during the winter months so they could build homes in the summer. The milk route was eventually sold and Schuette Lumber Company was formed (which later evolved into Schuette Builders Company). As the lumber company began running more smoothly, Earl & Cliff turned their energies to home construction.
- The 1950s - While attending the University of Wisconsin, Marv worked summers and vacations at the lumberyard. Upon graduation Marv's brothers, Earl & Cliff, offered him the opportunity to work full-time to "make something out of this darn lumberyard". As the decade came to a close, a subsidiary called the Housing Service Company was started.

Founders of Wausau Homes: Cliff, Marv and Earl Schuette

- The 1960s - This decade saw the evolution of the Closed Wall Panelization approach to home building, with Stressed Skin Floor Panels, Closed Wall Interior and Exterior Walls (similar to many prefabricated homes of today), closed roof panels and a mechanical core. One of the larger hurdles to overcome initially was industry acceptance. One of issues was with building inspectors, because the home was "closed wall" this meant the home could not be inspected on-site, this meant in many cases that the building inspector was brought into the plant to see the home first-hand during construction. The Housing Service Company was renamed to Wausau Homes, Inc in 1964.
- The 1970s - In 1973 Wausau Homes broke ground on construction for a brand new 330,000-square-foot (31,000 m^{2}) facility in Rothschild, WI with enough capacity to produce 4,000 homes annually. The Rothschild plant was In addition to the new production facility, Wausau Homes needed to aid its builders in developing and growing. Realizing the only way to achieve this was to build year-round, the a promotion program was implemented to achieve the goal of year-round building. This program continues today in both the winter and early spring. Also during the 1970s, Wausau Homes, Inc acquired Sterling Building Systems, a company which used an "open-wall" approach to construction using roof trusses rather than roof panels. Towards the later part of the decade, recession was starting to se-in while interest rates began to upwards of 9½%.
- The 1980s - With the country was in the midst of a deep recession and interest rates skyrocketing over 21%, costs needed to be cut even though the building system needed further development. The current "closed wall" system was ready for a change. From this need, came a hybrid "closed wall" system using Upson board rather than Gypsum. The roof system became a unique combination of ceiling panel and roof panel, which were folded together to conserve space during transportation. These panels were opened on the trailer and lifted onto the wall via crane. Internally the new system was dubbed "Jaws" as it resembled the jaws of a shark. Also during this time, a basic modular home was introduced using the principles of the original "closed wall" concept. The major advantage to the modular home was that it could be completely finished in the plant...including shingles, and shipped in two loads to the jobsite. In order to meet the demand and accurately price these homes, TOPS was developed. It was the Total Order Pricing System, which generated a fairly accurate estimate that included materials, labor, delivery and on-site construction. The first CAD (Computer-Aided Design) system was introduced to help speed up and simplify the engineering process.
- The 1990s - The 90's brought a period of transition for Wausau Homes, as old system began to be phased out and new immerging systems brought in. An Information Technology department was created to handle the interface between engineering, materials and productions as one seamless function. The Rothschild facility was re-tooled and re-aligned several times to better streamline production. Computerized saws and air-driven jig systems were implemented. Truss operations, previously outsourced, were now being added to branch plants in Waverly, OH and eventually Corning, IA. In an attempt to continue with the "One Source, One Invoice" concept, the B-Pack was introduced.
- The 2000s - With a new decade, came new challenges. Wausau Homes was at a crossroads, remain a regionally based company or continue to grow into a national company. Growth brought about new challenges with existing engineering systems, materials management and business systems. To meet the demands of these new challenges, the decision was made to utilize SAP R/3 to handle financial, material management, scheduling and interfaces to engineering as a way to streamline processes. In 2008 and 2009 Wausau Homes has faced hard times with two large layoffs and the closure of all regional plants except the Rothschild headquarters.

As the economy improved, Wausau Homes changed its business model to include only protected builder territories across the Midwest Region. Wausau Homes eliminated prefabricated and manufactured homes from its product offering and now focuses solely on panelized or component homes. Walls and trusses are constructed within the factory headquarters and all other new home features are constructed on-site.

== Community involvement ==
Marv Schuette and Wausau Homes have always been a strong supporter of programs that not only benefit youth but improve housing in general. His ability to see a need and devise a solution through innovative measures contributed greatly to a variety of areas, such as the United Way, the Community Foundation of North Central Wisconsin, the Habitat for Humanity, the Mead Wildlife Center, Northcentral Technical College , Junior Achievement of Wisconsin, Boy Scouts of America, and Girl Scouts of the USA.

The Meade Wild Life Center is for educating school children in a three county area of Central Wisconsin.

- Habitat For Humanity - Commencing with the 2004-2005 school year, Wausau Homes, Habitat for Humanity of Wausau, and three local high schools (Mosinee, Wausau East and D.C. Everest High Schools) formed a partnership which has benefited all parties. Wausau Homes has the opportunity to provide significant input into the construction trades; Habitat has access to three homes and the involvement of youthful construction workers; the high schools have a level of support that they have not had before and through their building construction programs would each construct a modular home at their sites during the school year.
- Boy Scouts / Girl Scouts of the USA & Meade Wildlife Center - Marv and Ruth Schuette built and donated both the Boy Scout / Girl Scout Center and the Meade Wild Life Center on behalf of the employees and builders of Wausau Homes.

The Wausau Homes Boy Scout/Girl Scout Center is the nation's first combined facility.

== See also ==
- Modular building
- Prefabricated Home
- Hip Roof
- Roof construction
