= Oxie Lane =

American football player (1905–1977)

Francis Charles "Oxie" Lane (January 2, 1905 – August 19, 1977) was a player in the National Football League for the Milwaukee Badgers in 1926 as a tackle. He played at the collegiate level at Marquette University.

== Biography ==
Lane was born on January 2, 1905, in Merrill, Wisconsin.
