= Merrill Railway & Lighting Co. =

Overview
- Owner: Merrill Railway & Lighting Co
- Locale: Merrill, Wisconsin
- Termini: Stuyvesant St.; Cottage St.

Service
- Type: First-generation streetcar
- Operator(s): Merrill Railway & Lighting Co

History
- Opened: 1889
- Closed: 1921

Technical
- Line length: 2 mi (3.2 km)
- Track gauge: 1,435 mm (4 ft 8 1/2 in) standard gauge
- Minimum radius: (?)
- Electrification: Unknown Voltage Two Wire Overhead lines

The Merrill Railway & Lighting Co was set up in 1889. During the first months of operation, problems with poor bonding of the track led to the electrocution of several animals. This led the company to develop the first use by a trolley company of a second suspended wire for return power.

The company experimented with one of the earliest trolleybus operations in 1913. Already experienced with two wire operation it purchased an 18 passenger vehicle from the Field Electric Bus Company. The use of the trolleybus avoided the need to construct three complex railroad crossings. The service was discontinued in less than a year.

The company was absorbed by the Wisconsin Valley Electric Company in 1916. The franchise ended in 1919 and the company was offered to the City for $1. The offer not being accepted, the service was replaced by buses of the affiliated Valley Transit Company in 1921.

== Route ==
Main St (Junction of Stuyvesant St. ), Mill St, 1st St., 2nd St. Polk St, 1st St., West Main (Junction of Cottage). Passing loops at Second St between Scott and Cleveland and on Polk. Car Barn at south end of Polk.

== Equipment ==
Original Equipment unknown.

- 1896 - Second hand car built by Jones in 1892 purchased.
- 1898 - Second hand car built by American in 1893 purchased from TMERL
- 1898 - Second hand car built by Pullman in 1893 purchased from TMERL
- 1903 - Second hand car built by American in 1893 purchased from Aurora Ill.
