= Rothschild, Wisconsin =

- Village
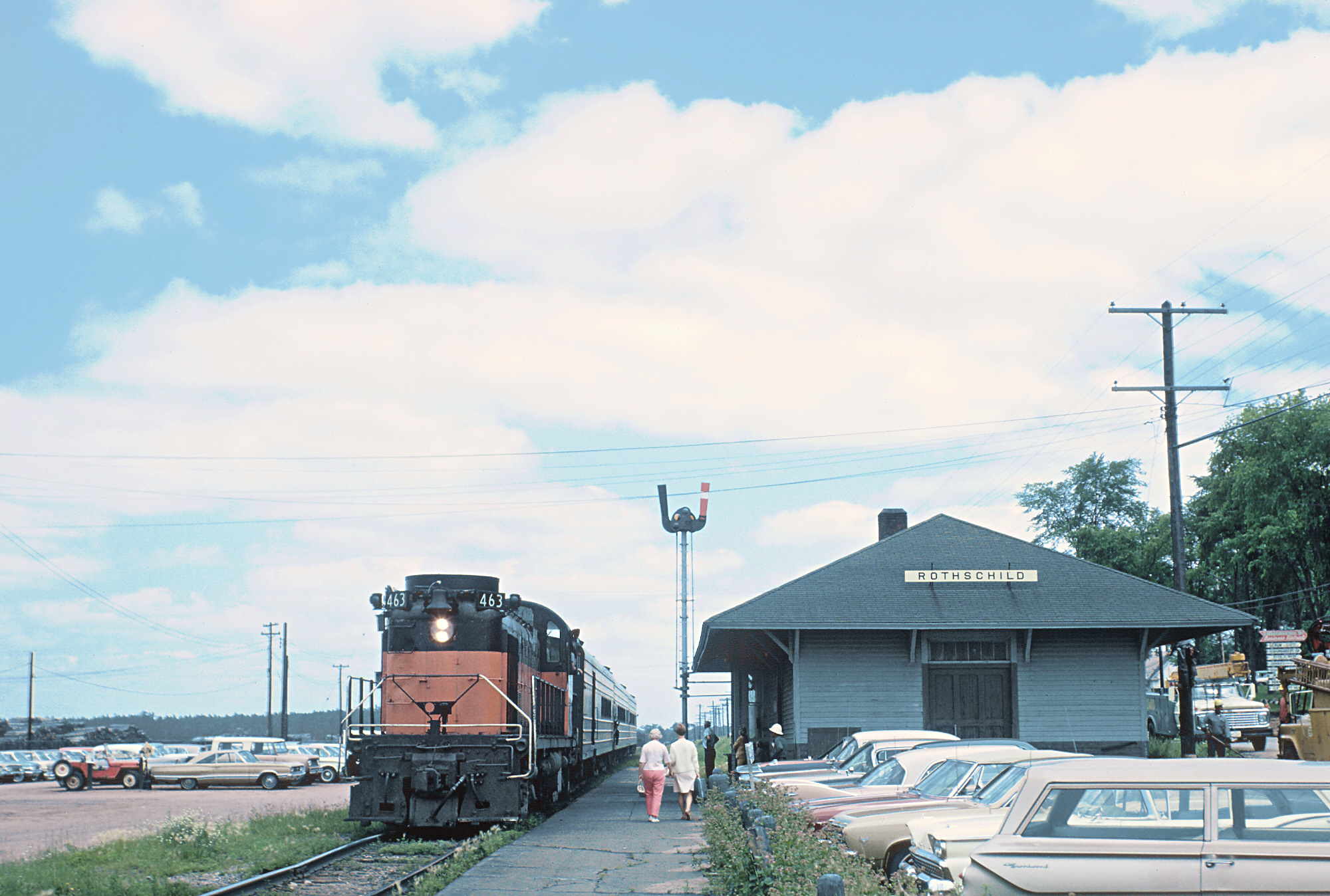
- A Milwaukee Road passenger train at Rothschild in 1967

- Location of Rothschild in Marathon County, Wisconsin.
- Coordinates: 44°52′54″N 89°37′14″W
- Country: United States
- State: Wisconsin
- County: Marathon

Area
  - Total: 6.90 sq mi (17.88 km^{2})
  - Land: 6.53 sq mi (16.91 km^{2})
  - Water: 0.37 sq mi (0.97 km^{2})
- Elevation: 1,198 ft (365 m)

Population (2020)
  - Total: 5,567
  - Density: 806.8/sq mi (311.49/km^{2})
- Time zone: UTC-6 (Central (CST))
  - Summer (DST): UTC-5 (CDT)
- Standard: 54474
- Area codes: 715 & 534
- FIPS code: 55-69725
- GNIS feature ID: 1572629
- Website: www.rothschildwi.com

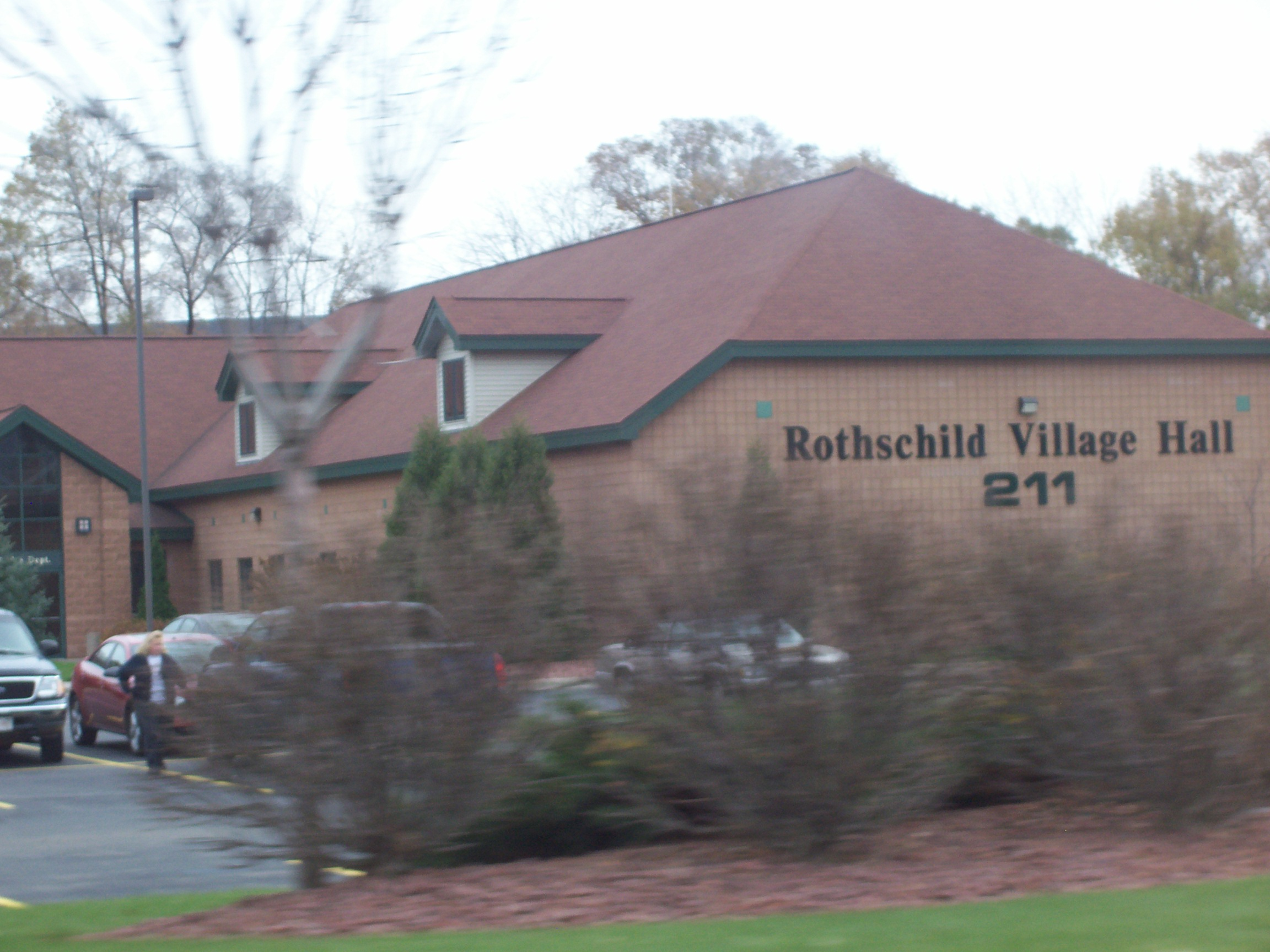
Village hall

Rothschild is a village in Marathon County, Wisconsin, United States. It is part of the Wausau, Wisconsin Metropolitan Statistical Area. The population was 5,567 at the 2020 census. Rothschild is the northern terminus of Interstate 39, which starts in Normal, Illinois.

== Geography ==
Rothschild is located at 44°52′54″N 89°37′14″W (44.881718, -89.620670). According to the United States Census Bureau, the village has a total area of 6.90 square miles (17.87 km^{2}), of which 6.53 square miles (16.91 km^{2}) is land and 0.37 square miles (0.96 km^{2}) is water.

== Demographics ==
Historical population
Census	Pop.	Note	%±
1920	413		—
1930	499		20.8%
1940	812		62.7%
1950	1,425		75.5%
1960	2,550		78.9%
1970	3,141		23.2%
1980	3,338		6.3%
1990	3,310		−0.8%
2000	4,970		50.2%
2010	5,269		6.0%
2020	5,567		5.7%
U.S. Decennial Census

=== 2010 census ===
As of the census of 2010, there were 5,269 people, 2,199 households, and 1,465 families living in the village. The population density was 806.9 inhabitants per square mile (311.5/km^{2}). There were 2,332 housing units at an average density of 357.1 per square mile (137.9/km^{2}). The racial makeup of the village was 93.9% White, 0.5% African American, 0.3% Native American, 3.8% Asian, 0.2% from other races, and 1.3% from two or more races. Hispanic or Latino of any race were 1.2% of the population.

There were 2,199 households, of which 28.2% had children under the age of 18 living with them, 55.2% were married couples living together, 7.3% had a female householder with no husband present, 4.2% had a male householder with no wife present, and 33.4% were non-families. 27.8% of all households were made up of individuals, and 10.3% had someone living alone who was 65 years of age or older. The average household size was 2.38 and the average family size was 2.90.

The median age in the village was 41.8 years. 22.4% of residents were under the age of 18; 7.1% were between the ages of 18 and 24; 25.1% were from 25 to 44; 29.2% were from 45 to 64; and 16.1% were 65 years of age or older. The gender makeup of the village was 49.4% male and 50.6% female.

=== 2000 census ===
As of the census of 2000, there were 4,970 people, 1,922 households, and 1,406 families living in the village. The population density was 763.1 people per square mile (294.8/km^{2}). There were 1,988 housing units at an average density of 305.2 per square mile (117.9/km^{2}). The racial makeup of the village was 96.16% White, 0.28% African American, 0.28% Native American, 2.88% Asian, 0.02% Pacific Islander, 0.08% from other races, and 0.30% from two or more races. Hispanic or Latino of any race were 0.28% of the population.

There were 1,922 households, out of which 34.5% had children under the age of 18 living with them, 62.7% were married couples living together, 7.5% had a female householder with no husband present, and 26.8% were non-families. 21.9% of all households were made up of individuals, and 8.7% had someone living alone who was 65 years of age or older. The average household size was 2.56 and the average family size was 3.01.

In the village, the population was spread out, with 26.4% under the age of 18, 6.8% from 18 to 24, 28.8% from 25 to 44, 25.6% from 45 to 64, and 12.4% who were 65 years of age or older. The median age was 38 years. For every 100 females, there were 99.1 males. For every 100 females age 18 and over, there were 94.9 males.

The median income for a household in the village was $50,543, and the median income for a family was $58,149. Males had a median income of $37,468 versus $25,439 for females. The per capita income for the village was $22,236. About 2.6% of families and 4.0% of the population were below the poverty line, including 0.2% of those under age 18 and 11.0% of those age 65 or over.

== Transportation ==
=== Airport ===
The Central Wisconsin Airport (KCWA) serves Rothschild, the county and surrounding communities with both scheduled commercial jet service and general aviation services.

== Economy ==
Wausau Homes Inc and Wausau Tile have their headquarters in Rothschild.

One of the larger employers in Rothschild is the Domtar Paper Mill. The mill was originally built between 1909 and 1910 by a group of local lumber barons. The mill produced its first reel of paper in 1910 and was incorporated under the name Marathon Paper Mills. At that time, the area that was to become Rothschild was still considered the Town of Weston. However, the company built and maintained several homes, a community hall, boarding house and general store. As the mill town grew around the paper mill, the area soon became incorporated as the village of Rothschild.

The paper mill has seen many upgrades over the years as well as changes in ownership. In the 1950s, the American Can Company purchased Marathon Corporation. In 1973, Weyerhaeuser purchased a large portion of the mill from American Can. Then again, in the 2000s, Domtar purchased the mill from Weyerhaeuser.

At its heyday in the early 1970s, the mill employed over 1,000 workers, operating four paper machines. Today, only one machine remains in operation.

== Rothschild Area Branch Library ==
The library in Rothschild opened its doors in 1949 when the Rothschild Homemakers group worked with the county librarian to establish a branch library. First located in a small cloak room in the village hall, it soon moved upstairs to a larger area.

When a fire destroyed the village hall in 1968, the village constructed a new building for the library and village offices. In 1973 the Rothschild Branch Library became a branch of the newly formed Marathon County Public Library when the Wausau Public Library and Marathon County Library merged.

By 1998, the Village of Rothschild needed more office space and the library was in need of expansion. This led to the construction of a new library/village hall complex completed in March 1999. The Schofield and Rothschild Branch Libraries were merged to form a larger branch library that had more open hours and a larger collection.
