= Lincoln County Courthouse (Wisconsin) =

- U.S. National Register of Historic Places
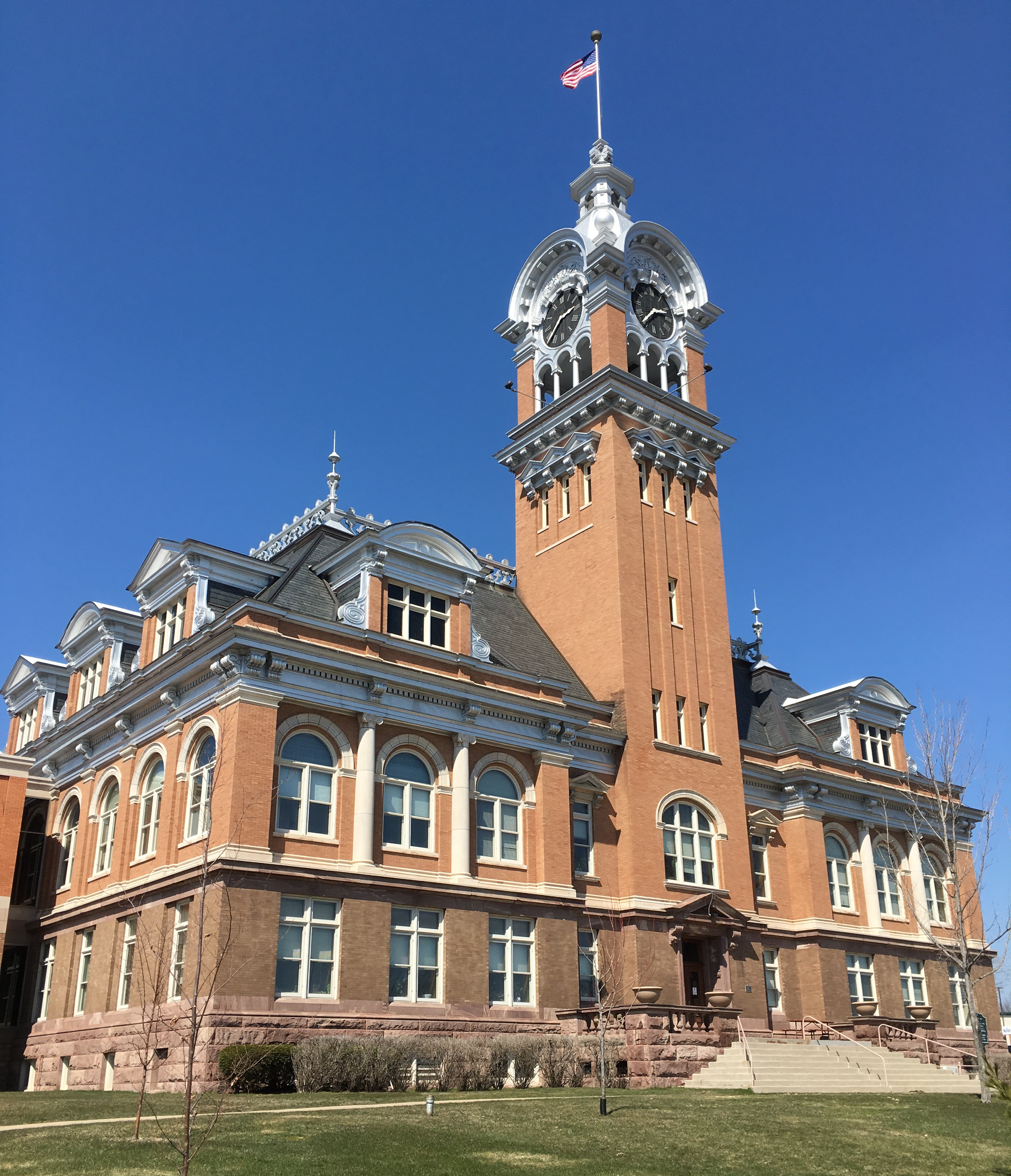

- Location within Wisconsin Location within the United States
- Interactive map showing the location for Lincoln County Courthouse
- Location: 1110 E. Main St., Merrill, Wisconsin
- Coordinates: 45°10′52″N 89°41′02″W
- Area: 1.7 acres (0.69 ha)
- Built: 1903
- Architect: Van Ryn & DeGelleke
- Architectural style: Beaux-Arts
- NRHP reference No.: 78000116
- Added to NRHP: April 19, 1978

The Lincoln County Courthouse is located in Merrill, Wisconsin. It was listed on the National Register of Historic Places in 1978 and on the State Register of Historic Places in 1989.
