= Wisconsin Valley Library Service =

Coordinates: 44.959652°N 89.630887°W

The Wisconsin Valley Library Service (WVLS) is a library system made up of 25 public libraries and hundreds of non-public libraries across seven counties in north-central Wisconsin. These include the counties of Clark, Forest, Langlade, Lincoln, Marathon, Oneida, and Taylor. The WVLS offices are located in the headquarters of the Marathon County Public Library in Wausau, Wisconsin.

== Overview ==
The Wisconsin Valley Library Service is one of 15 library systems in Wisconsin. It provides library services to residents of the system area, such as interlibrary loan and reference referrals, in-service training programs, and professional advisory services.

== Administration ==
WVLS operates under Chapter 43 of the Wisconsin State Statutes and is governed by a 15-member Board of Trustees. Each participating county has at least one member on the board. The remainder are allocated according to population. Trustees are appointed by the Chairs of the County Boards of Supervisors.

== WVLS member public libraries ==
The following public libraries are currently members of WVLS:

- Marathon County Public Library, headquartered in Wausau, Marathon County
- Abbotsford Public Library in Abbotsford, Clark County
- Antigo Public Library, headquartered in Antigo, Langlade County
- Colby Community Library in Colby, Clark County
- Crandon Public Library in Crandon, Forest County
- Dorchester Public Library in Dorchester, Clark County
- Western Taylor County Public Library in Gilman, Taylor County
- Granton Community Library in Granton, Clark County
- Greenwood Public Library in Greenwood, Clark County
- Edith B. Evans Memorial Library in Laona, Forest County
- Loyal Public Library in Loyal, Clark County
- Frances L. Simek Memorial Library in Medford, Taylor County
- T.B. Scott Free Library in Merrill, Lincoln County
- Minocqua Public Library in Minocqua, Oneida County
- Neillsville Public Library in Neillsville, Clark County
- Owen Public Library in Owen, Clark County
- Rhinelander District Library in Rhinelander, Oneida County
- Rib Lake Public Library in Rib Lake, Taylor County
- Jean M. Thomsen Memorial Library in Stetsonville, Taylor County
- Thorp Public Library in Thorp, Clark County
- Edward U. Demmer Memorial Library in Three Lakes, Oneida County
- Tomahawk Public Library in Tomahawk, Lincoln County
- Wabeno Public Library in Wabeno, Forest County
- Westboro Public Library in Westboro, Taylor County
- Withee Public Library in Withee, Clark County
