= Prairie River (Wisconsin) =

River in Wisconsin, United States

Coordinates: 45°10′41″N 89°41′27″W

The Prairie River is a tributary of the Wisconsin River in north-central Wisconsin in the United States. It is about 40 mi (65 km) long. Via the Wisconsin River, it is part of the Mississippi River watershed.

== Course ==
The Prairie River flows from Horseshoe Lake in northwestern Langlade County and follows a generally southwestward course through southeastern Lincoln County to the city of Merrill, where it joins the Wisconsin River.

In an effort to restore trout habitat, the Wisconsin Department of Natural Resources removed two dams on the Prairie River in Lincoln County in the 1990s, making the river free-flowing for its entire course.

== See also ==
- List of Wisconsin rivers
