= Merrill City Hall =

- U.S. National Register of Historic Places
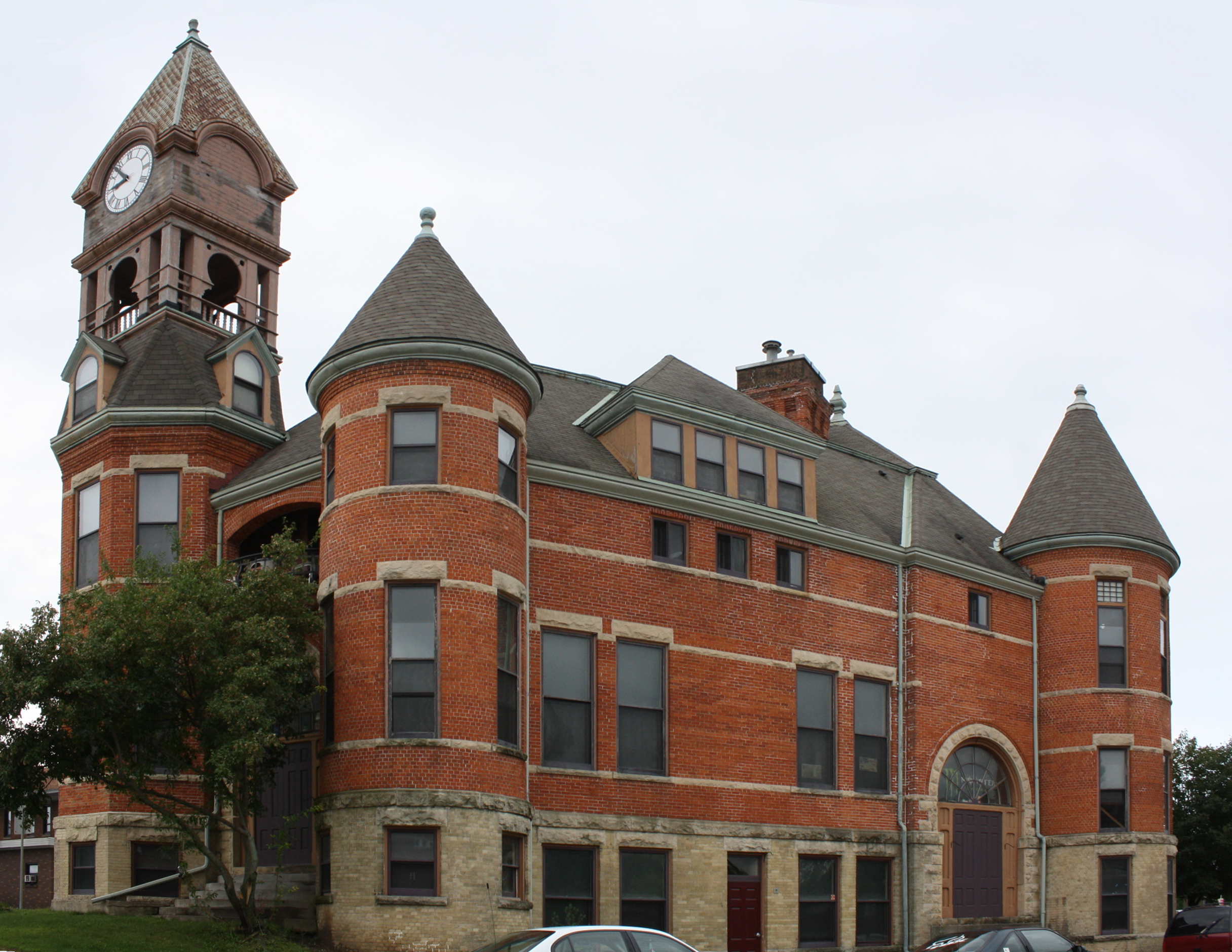
- Merrill City Hall
- Location: 717 E. 2nd St. Merrill, Wisconsin
- Coordinates: 45.18034°N 89.68995°W
- Built: 1888-1889
- Architect: T. D. Allen
- Architectural style: Queen Anne
- NRHP reference No.: 78000117
- Added to NRHP: July 12, 1978

Merrill City Hall is located in Merrill, Wisconsin. It was added to the National Register of Historic Places in 1978.

== History ==
When it originally opened, the building housed a jail and the T.B. Scott Free Library in addition to the city offices.

It was listed in the National Register of Historic Places in 1978. The city hall moved to a newer location in 1977.

Merrill City Hall was constructed in the Richardsonian Romanesque style and made of local brick, sandstone, and virgin timber.

Currently, the building serves as an apartment complex known as the Merrill City Hall Apartments. It still incorporates many of the historical elements of the building into the design of the individual apartment units.
