= T.B. Scott Free Library =

- Scott, T. B., Free Library
- U.S. National Register of Historic Places
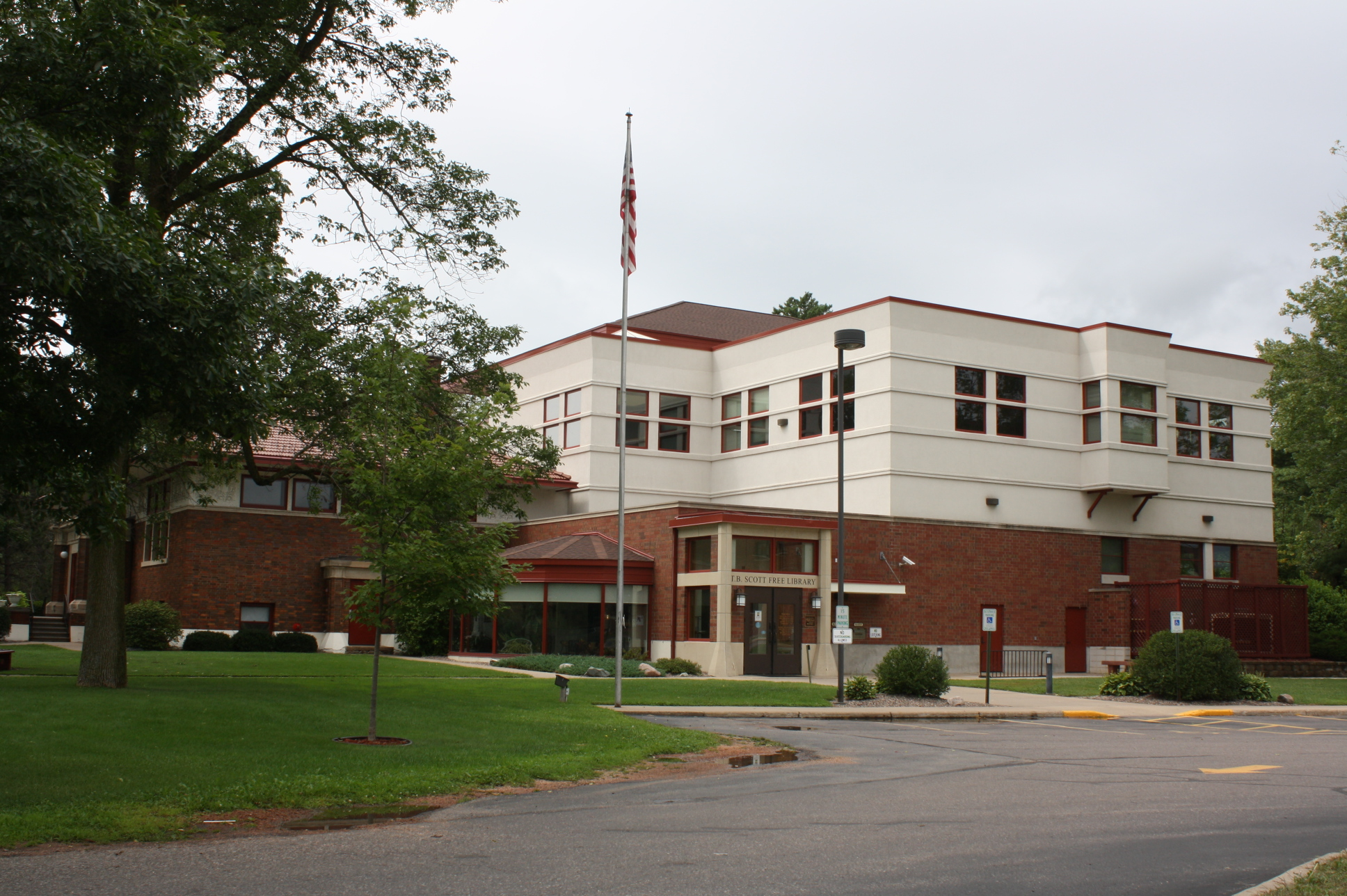

- Location within Wisconsin Location within the United States
- Location: Merrill, Wisconsin
- Coordinates: 45°10′47″N 89°42′5″W
- Built: 1911
- Architect: Claude & Starck
- Architectural style: Prairie School
- NRHP reference No.: 74000096
- Added to NRHP: January 21, 1974

The T.B. Scott Free Library is a public library in the city of Merrill, Wisconsin. The building, completed in 1911, was designed by the firm of Claude and Starck and funded with $17,500 from the Carnegie Corporation. It is listed on the National Register of Historic Places. Prior to the construction of its own building in 1964, the library was housed at Merrill City Hall. The library building has had two additions in 1969 and in 2001.

In 2017, T.B. Scott Free Library installed a 27.25 kilowatt solar power array expected to provide about 15 percent of the library's annual electricity usage. The project includes 79 solar collectors, made in the U.S. and featuring a 25-year warranty. The solar array is located on the south and south-west sides of the roof of the library's 2001 addition. There is a learning kiosk located in the library's lobby level where the public, in real-time, can track the solar project's performance and the library's overall energy usage, providing a valuable educational component.

The T.B. Scott Free Library is a member of the Wisconsin Valley Library Service (WVLS), a library system made up of 26 public libraries and 212 non-public libraries across seven counties in north-central Wisconsin. In 2017, the library's circulation was 46% to city residents and 47% to county residents.

The library has won the Library of the Year award from the Wisconsin Library Association twice, in 2002 and 1977. The library is also profiled in the 2007 book Heart of the Community: The Libraries We Love.
