= First Street Bridge (Merrill, Wisconsin) =

- U.S. National Register of Historic Places
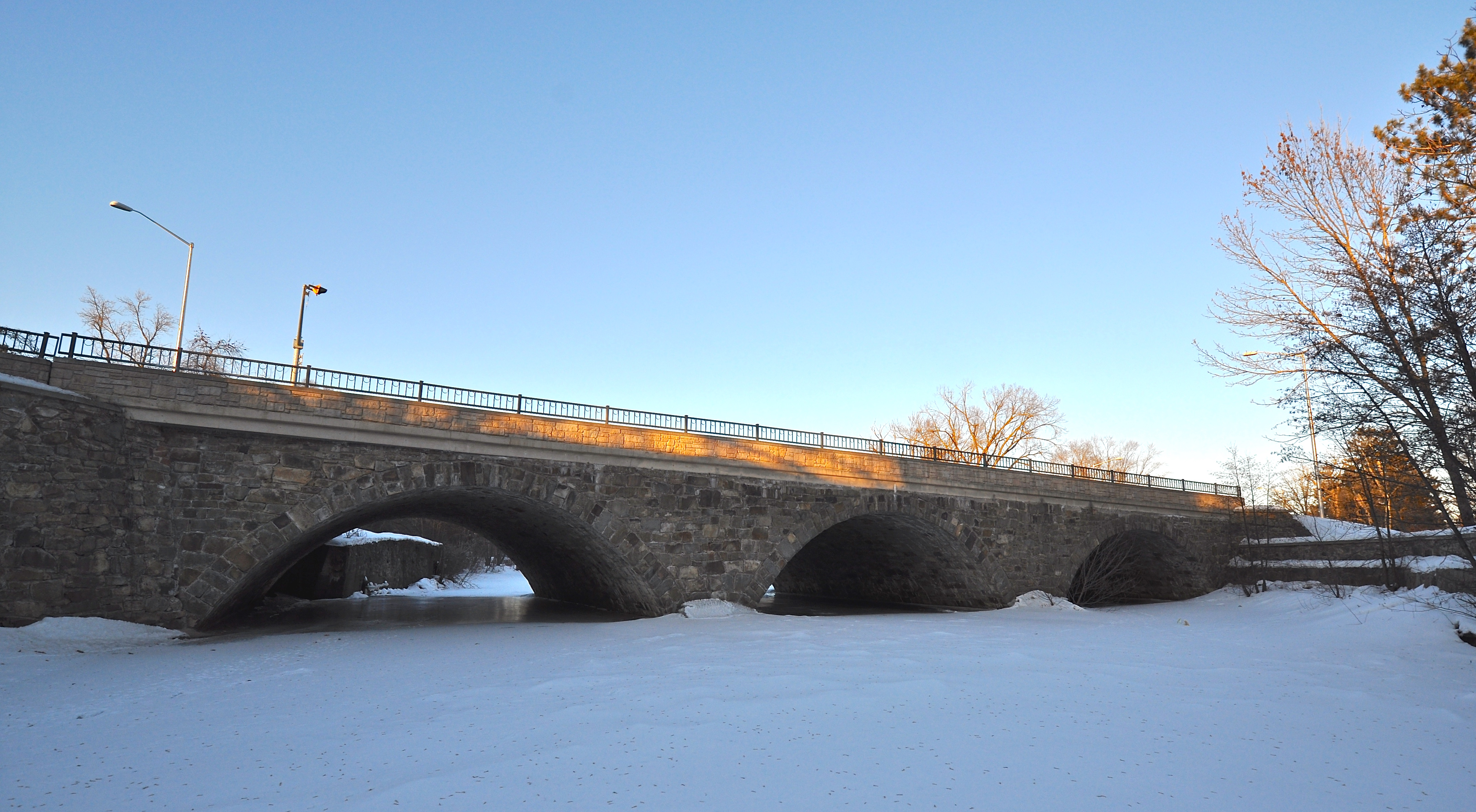
- First Street Bridge, February 2015.

- Location within Wisconsin Location within the United States
- Location: 1st St. spanning the Prairie River, Merrill, Wisconsin
- Coordinates: 45°10′44″N 89°42′12″W
- Area: less than one acre
- Built: 1904
- Built by: Hesterman, Fred
- Architectural style: stone-arch
- NRHP reference No.: 96001017
- Added to NRHP: September 12, 1996

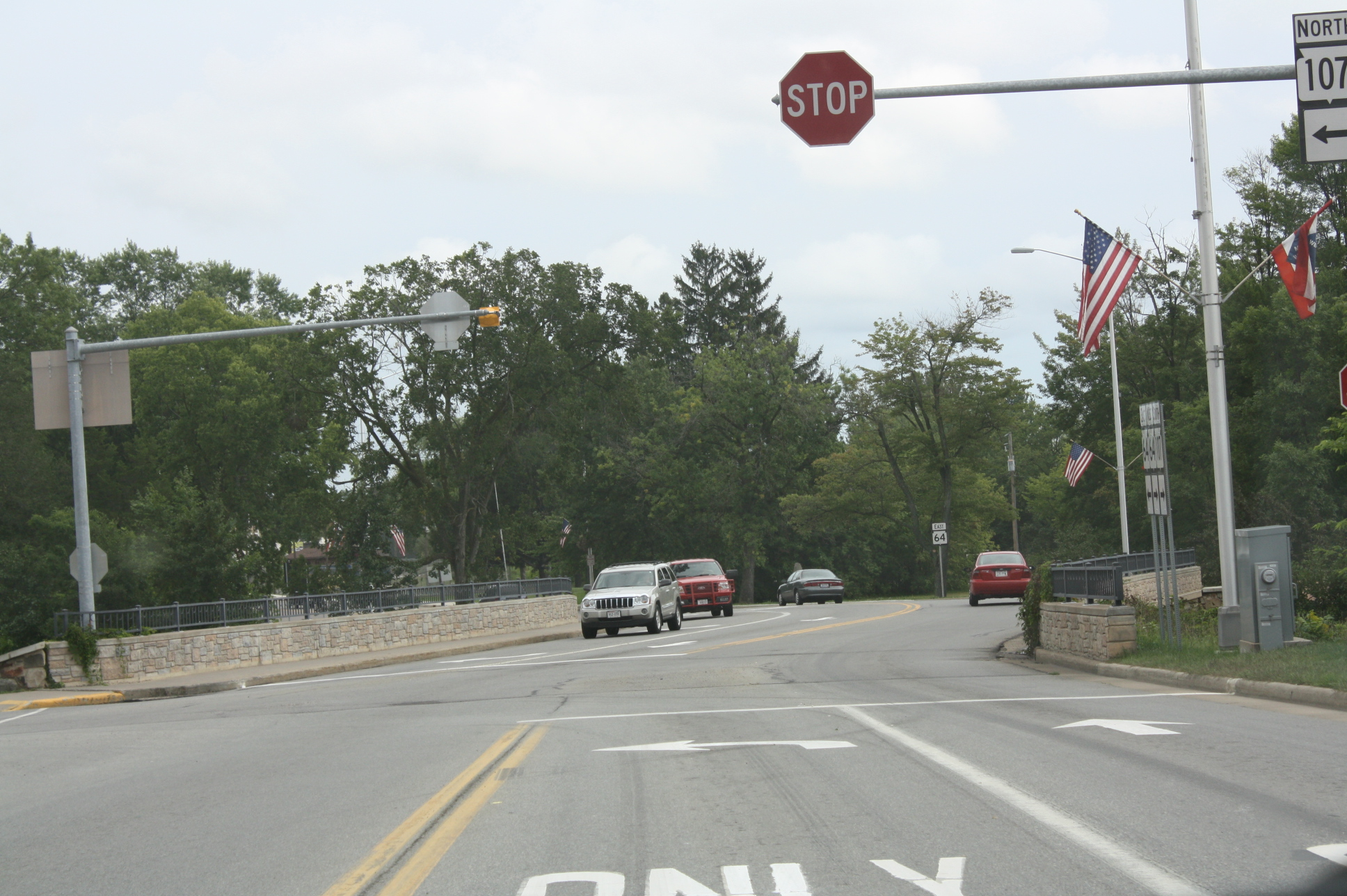
centerline

The First Street Bridge is a stone arch bridge in Merrill, Wisconsin, which carries First Street across the Prairie River. The bridge is 130 feet (40 m) long and has three arches. Each arch is bordered by an alternating pattern of single and double stones and is capped by 30-inch (760 mm) keystones. Contractor Fred Hesterman built the bridge in 1904, replacing an existing bridge. The bridge is the only known three stone arch bridge in Wisconsin.

The bridge was added to the National Register of Historic Places on September 12, 1996.
