= Merrill, Wisconsin =

- City
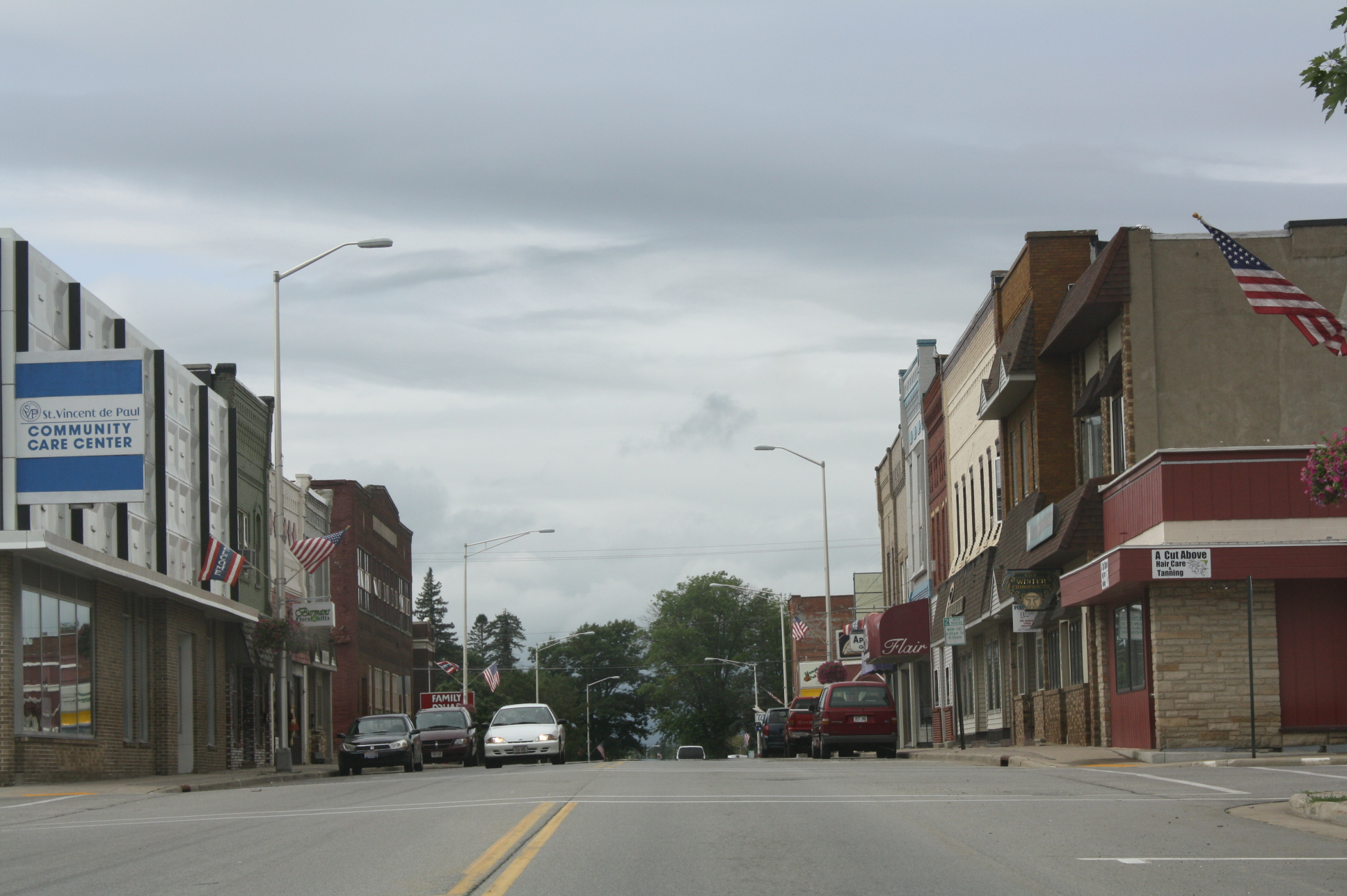
- Looking west at the western downtown
- Nickname: City of Parks
- Location of Merrill in Lincoln County, Wisconsin

- Location within Wisconsin Location within the United States
- Coordinates: 45°10′57″N 89°41′44″W
- Country: United States
- State: Wisconsin
- County: Lincoln County
- Name Adopted: 1881
- First Mayor and City Council: 1883

Government
  - Mayor: Steve Hass

Area
  - Total: 8.08 sq mi (20.94 km^{2})
  - Land: 7.51 sq mi (19.44 km^{2})
  - Water: 0.58 sq mi (1.50 km^{2}) 7.30%
- Elevation: 1,316 ft (401 m)

Population (2020)
  - Total: 9,347
  - Estimate (2022): 9,122
  - Density: 1,246/sq mi (480.9/km^{2})
- Demonym: Merrillite
- Time zone: UTC-6 (CST)
  - Summer (DST): UTC-5 (CDT)
- ZIP code: 54452
- Area codes: 715 & 534
- FIPS code: 55-51250
- Website: www.ci.merrill.wi.us

Merrill is a city in and the county seat of Lincoln County, Wisconsin, United States. It is located to the south of and adjacent to the Town of Merrill. The population was 9,347, according to the 2020 census. Merrill is part of the United States Census Bureau's Merrill MSA, which includes all of Lincoln County. Together with the Wausau MSA, which includes all of Marathon County, it forms the Wausau-Merrill CSA.

== History ==
Merrill was first inhabited by the Chippewa Native Americans. The first European settlement there was a logging town named Jenny Bull Falls. By 1843, a trading post was constructed near the town; John Faely was the first settler. Within four years a dam, started by Andrew Warren, was constructed over the Wisconsin River. Warren then established the first mill powered by the dam, and other saw mills in the area. In 1870, T. B. Scott succeeded Warren, and the mill soon became increasingly successful. In 1899 the mill burned down. During that time the name of the community was changed to Merrill, in honor of Sherburn S. Merrill (1818–1885), the general manager of the Chicago, Milwaukee, St. Paul, and Pacific Railroad.

In 1881, the Wisconsin Telephone Company began operation, with 20 phones in service. In 1883, the first City Council met and T. B. Scott was named the first mayor. By 1885, the population had risen to 7,000, approximately 3,000 less than Merrill's population today. The railroad and passenger depot was a hub of social activity through the lumber industry's boom years and after. It later became a community youth center, but has since been razed. By 1900, the timber industry was in decline and the community was compelled to diversify its economy. In 1892, the Weinbrenner Shoe Company was established with Merrill headquarters.

In July 1912, the Wisconsin River and several of its tributaries flooded from Rothschild to Merrill, destroying several dams (active and abandoned), as well as causing hundreds of thousands of dollars in damage in Merrill.

== Geography ==
Merrill is located at 45°10′57″N 89°41′44″W (45.182569, -89.69559), along the Wisconsin River at its confluence with the Prairie River.

According to the United States Census Bureau, the city has a total area of 8.08 square miles (20.93 km^{2}), of which 7.5 square miles (19.42 km^{2}) is land and 0.58 square miles (1.50 km^{2}) is water.

Merrill is located west of US Route 51 on State Highway 64 (Main Street).

Council Grounds State Park is due west of the city.

=== Climate ===
Climate data for Merrill, Wisconsin (1991–2020 normals, extremes 1905–present)
Month	Jan	Feb	Mar	Apr	May	Jun	Jul	Aug	Sep	Oct	Nov	Dec	Year
Record high °F (°C)	57 (14)	65 (18)	86 (30)	92 (33)	104 (40)	104 (40)	110 (43)	101 (38)	97 (36)	89 (32)	75 (24)	62 (17)	110 (43)
Mean daily maximum °F (°C)	22.0 (−5.6)	26.6 (−3.0)	38.7 (3.7)	52.9 (11.6)	66.6 (19.2)	76.1 (24.5)	80.2 (26.8)	77.9 (25.5)	69.7 (20.9)	55.4 (13.0)	39.7 (4.3)	27.4 (−2.6)	52.8 (11.6)
Daily mean °F (°C)	12.7 (−10.7)	15.8 (−9.0)	27.9 (−2.3)	41.3 (5.2)	54.6 (12.6)	64.6 (18.1)	68.6 (20.3)	66.3 (19.1)	58.0 (14.4)	44.9 (7.2)	31.4 (−0.3)	19.4 (−7.0)	42.1 (5.6)
Mean daily minimum °F (°C)	3.4 (−15.9)	5.1 (−14.9)	17.0 (−8.3)	29.6 (−1.3)	42.6 (5.9)	53.2 (11.8)	57.1 (13.9)	54.7 (12.6)	46.3 (7.9)	34.5 (1.4)	23.1 (−4.9)	11.4 (−11.4)	31.5 (−0.3)
Record low °F (°C)	−48 (−44)	−42 (−41)	−35 (−37)	−5 (−21)	18 (−8)	28 (−2)	33 (1)	30 (−1)	18 (−8)	4 (−16)	−15 (−26)	−31 (−35)	−48 (−44)
Average precipitation inches (mm)	1.19 (30)	1.06 (27)	1.75 (44)	2.93 (74)	3.72 (94)	4.63 (118)	3.82 (97)	4.05 (103)	3.86 (98)	3.16 (80)	2.06 (52)	1.53 (39)	33.76 (858)
Average snowfall inches (cm)	12.4 (31)	11.6 (29)	7.2 (18)	5.5 (14)	0.1 (0.25)	0.0 (0.0)	0.0 (0.0)	0.0 (0.0)	0.0 (0.0)	0.9 (2.3)	5.0 (13)	11.6 (29)	54.3 (138)
Average precipitation days (≥ 0.01 in)	10.6	7.9	9.0	11.7	13.6	13.8	12.0	11.7	12.6	12.5	9.8	11.0	136.2
Average snowy days (≥ 0.1 in)	9.7	7.0	5.1	2.6	0.1	0.0	0.0	0.0	0.0	0.8	4.4	8.9	38.6
Source: NOAA

== Demographics ==
Historical population
Census	Pop.	Note	%±
1880	882		—
1890	6,809		672.0%
1900	8,537		25.4%
1910	8,689		1.8%
1920	8,068		−7.1%
1930	8,458		4.8%
1940	8,711		3.0%
1950	8,951		2.8%
1960	9,451		5.6%
1970	9,502		0.5%
1980	9,578		0.8%
1990	9,860		2.9%
2000	10,146		2.9%
2010	9,661		−4.8%
2020	9,347		−3.3%
2022 (est.)	9,122		−2.4%
U.S. Decennial Census

=== 2020 census ===
As of the census of 2020, the population was 9,347. The population density was 1,245.6 inhabitants per square mile (480.9/km^{2}). There were 4,503 housing units at an average density of 600.1 per square mile (231.7/km^{2}). The racial makeup of the city was 93.1% White, 0.7% Native American, 0.7% Black or African American, 0.4% Asian, 1.0% from other races, and 4.1% from two or more races. Ethnically, the population was 2.6% Hispanic or Latino of any race.

=== 2010 census ===
As of the census of 2010, there were 9,661 people, 4,175 households, and 2,516 families residing in the city. The population density was 1,334.4 inhabitants per square mile (515.2/km^{2}). There were 4,619 housing units at an average density of 638.0 per square mile (246.3/km^{2}). The racial makeup of the city was 96.3% White, 0.5% African American, 0.4% Native American, 0.6% Asian, 0.8% from other races, and 1.2% from two or more races. Hispanic or Latino people of any race were 2.0% of the population.

There were 4,175 households, of which 29.4% had children under the age of 18 living with them, 43.0% were married couples living together, 12.4% had a female householder with no husband present, 4.9% had a male householder with no wife present, and 39.7% were non-families. 35.0% of all households were made up of individuals, and 17.4% had someone living alone who was 65 years of age or older. The average household size was 2.25 and the average family size was 2.88.

The median age in the city was 40.4 years. 23.9% of residents were under the age of 18; 7.2% were between the ages of 18 and 24; 24.9% were from 25 to 44; 24.5% were from 45 to 64; and 19.4% were 65 years of age or older. The gender makeup of the city was 47.6% male and 52.4% female.

=== 2000 census ===
As of the census of 2000, there were 10,146 people, 4,183 households, and 2,631 families residing in the city. The population density was 1,441.7 people per square mile (556.4/km^{2}). There were 4,397 housing units at an average density of 624.8 per square mile (241.1/km^{2}). The racial makeup of the city was 97.77% White, 0.20% Black or African American, 0.54% Native American, 0.42% Asian, 0.04% Pacific Islander, 0.36% from other races, and 0.66% from two or more races. 1.03% of the population were Hispanic or Latino of any race.

There were 4,183 households, out of which 31.0% had children under the age of 18 living with them, 47.2% were married couples living together, 11.9% had a female householder with no husband present, and 37.1% were non-families. 32.3% of all households were made up of individuals, and 17.6% had someone living alone who was 65 years of age or older. The average household size was 2.34 and the average family size was 2.96.

In the city, the population was spread out, with 25.3% under the age of 18, 8.5% from 18 to 24, 27.5% from 25 to 44, 19.1% from 45 to 64, and 19.7% who were 65 years of age or older. The median age was 37 years. For every 100 females, there were 89.8 males. For every 100 females age 18 and over, there were 84.4 males.

The median income for a household in the city was $33,098, and the median income for a family was $45,860. Males had a median income of $30,789 versus $21,372 for females. The per capita income for the city was $17,429. About 5.7% of families and 9.5% of the population were below the poverty line, including 10.7% of those under age 18 and 15.0% of those age 65 or over.

== Government ==
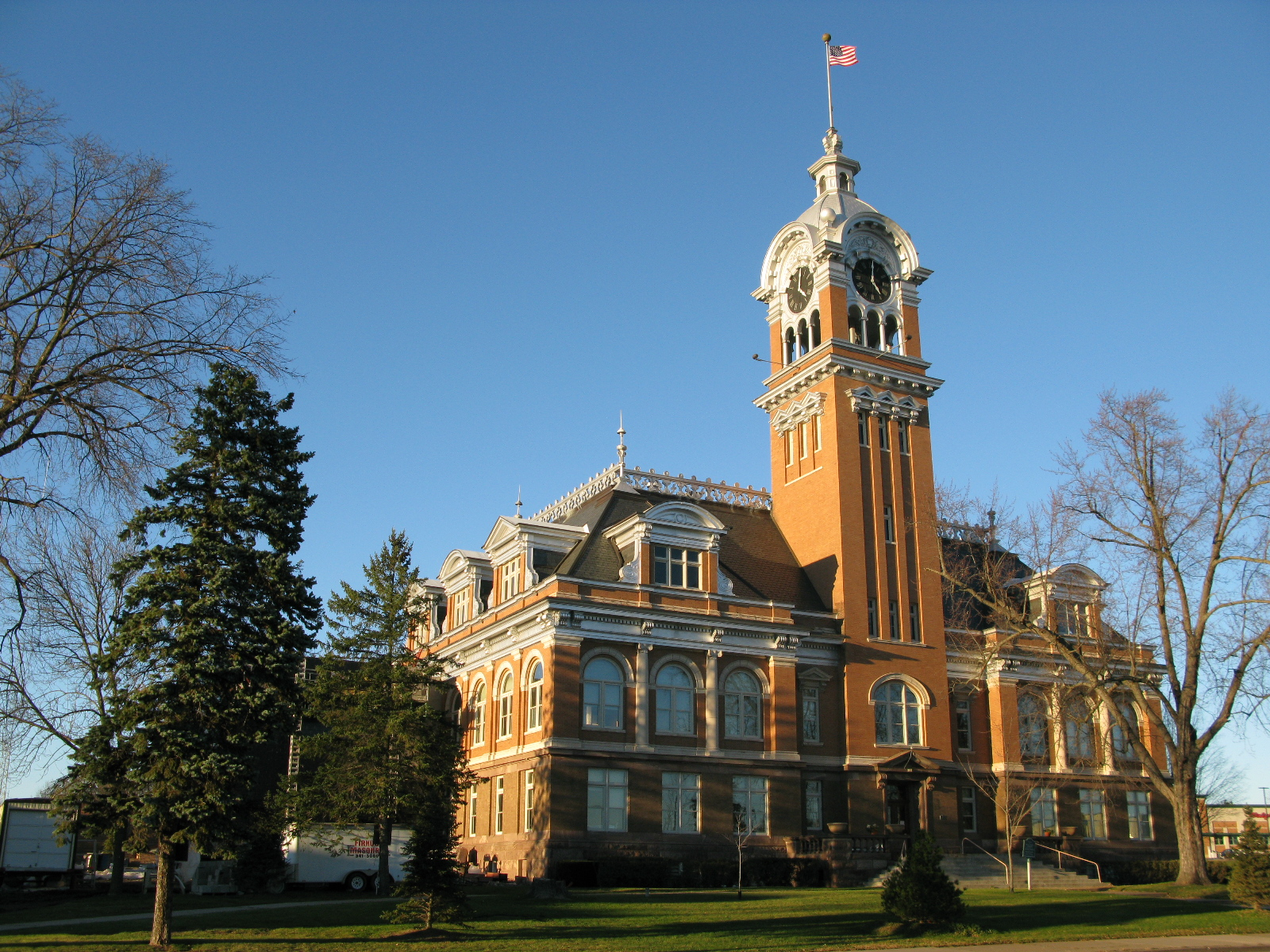
Lincoln County Courthouse

The Lincoln County Courthouse, begun in 1903, was completed at a cost of $119,882. Its central rotunda is 32 feet in diameter; second floor offices lead off its balcony. A 48-inch bell and one-ton clock were mounted on the roof tower. It was added to the National Register of Historic Places on April 19, 1978.

== Education ==
Merrill is served by the Merrill Area Public School District. Northcentral Technical College's Public Safety Training center was built in Merrill in 2005.

=== Public schools ===
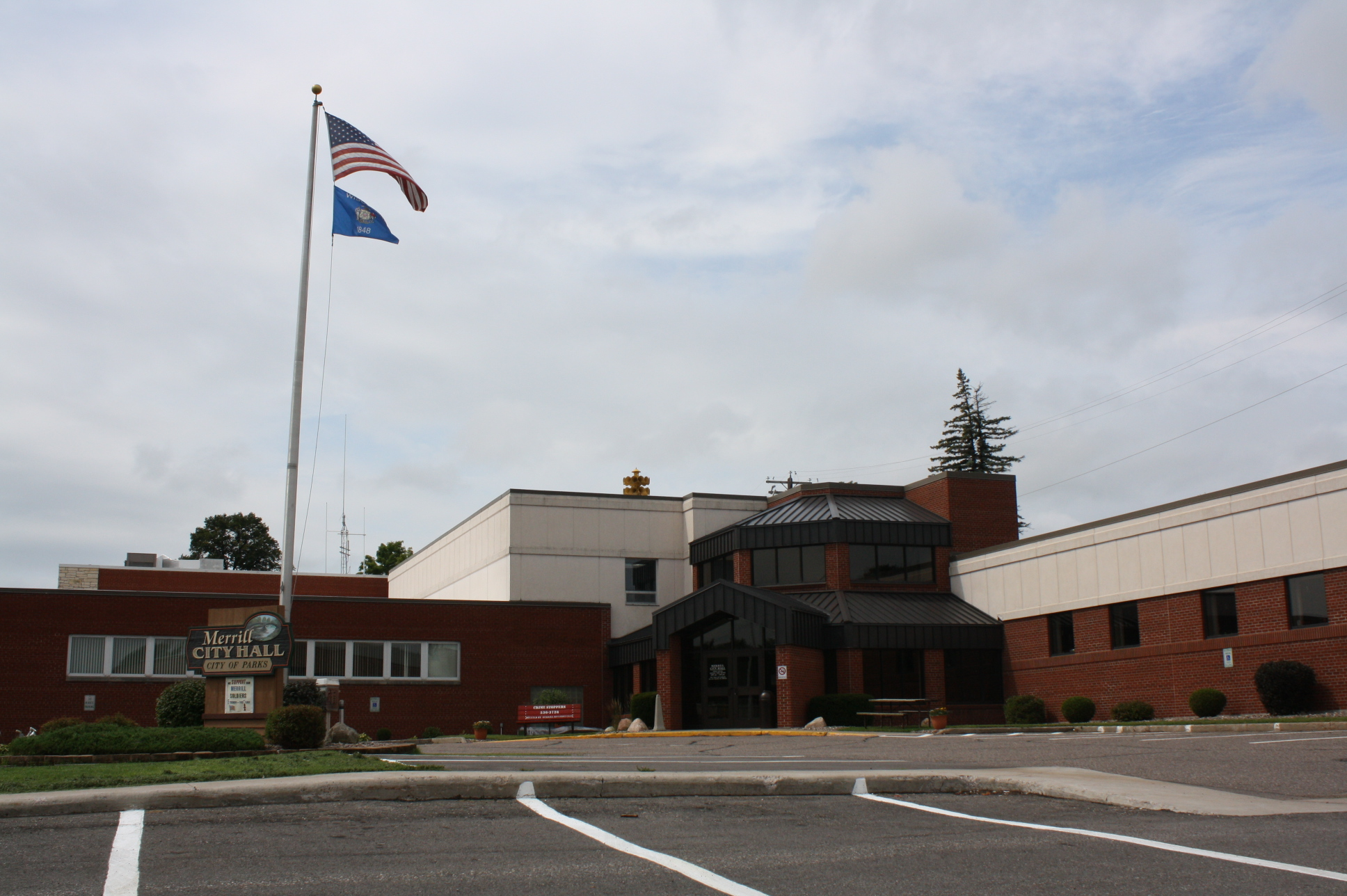
City hall

- Kate Goodrich Elementary School
- Washington Elementary School
- Prairie River Middle School
- Merrill High School

=== Private schools ===
- Trinity Lutheran School
- St. John Lutheran School
- St. Francis Xavier Catholic School
- New Testament Church Christian Academy

== Transportation ==
=== Highways ===
U.S. 51 Northbound US 51 travels to Woodruff, Wisconsin. Southbound, US 51 routes to Wausau, Wisconsin.
WIS 17 travels north to Rhinelander, Wisconsin.
WIS 64 travels east to Antigo, Wisconsin and west to Medford, Wisconsin.
WIS 107 travels north to Tomahawk, Wisconsin and south to Mosinee, Wisconsin.

From 1889 to 1921 a streetcar line was operated by the Merrill Railway & Lighting Co., which also operated one of the earliest trolleybus lines in the United States in 1913.

=== Local transit ===
The City of Merrill operates an on-demand bus system within the city limits, known as the Merrill Transit System (formerly Merrill-Go-Round). As of 2019, the fee is $2.00 general and $1.00 for the elderly and disabled.

The community supports the private Blue Jay Taxi service. The service is in part supported by the Merrill/Tomahawk Tavern League through its SafeRide Home program, providing over 1,200 free ride vouchers annually. It is locally funded by the annual Lobsterfest event. The program is unique to Wisconsin, and is considered an effective means by other states to eliminate drunk driving.

=== Airport ===
Merrill is served by the Merrill Municipal Airport (KRRL). Located one mile northwest of the city's center, the airport handles approximately 18,600 operations per year, with roughly 96% general aviation and 4% air taxi. The airport has a 5,100-foot asphalt runway with approved GPS approaches (Runway 7-25) and a 2,997-foot asphalt crosswind runway (Runway 16-34).

== Parks and recreation ==
=== Parks ===
Community parks:

- Lion's Park
- Stange Park
- Merrill Area Recreation Complex (MARC)
- Dog Park

Neighborhood parks:

- Streeter Square
- Ott's Park
- Riverside Park
- Stange Kitchenette
- Normal Park

Special use:

- Athletic Park
- Gebert Park
- Memorial Forest Wildlife Area

State:

- Council Grounds State Park

Other:

- Camp New Wood County Park
- Cenotaph Memorial Park
- Jack Pines Park
- Tug Lake Recreation Area

=== Recreation ===
- Merrill Enrichment Center
- MARC/Smith Center
- Merrill Soccer
- Merrill City Band
- Merrill Tennis
- River Bend Trail
- Merrill City Softball
- Merrill Fast Pitch

== Historic places ==
- Center Avenue Historic District
- First Street Bridge
- Fromm, Walter, and Mabel House
- Lincoln County Courthouse
- Merrill City Hall
- Merrill Post Office
- T.B. Scott Free Library
- Gesundheit, Maine Street (1874)

== Notable people ==
- Wendy Boglioli, Olympic swimming gold medalist
- Peter B. Champagne, Wisconsin politician
- Walter Chilsen, Wisconsin politician
- Walter B. Chilsen, Wisconsin politician and newspaper editor
- Charles Chvala, Wisconsin politician
- Sheehan Donoghue, Wisconsin politician
- William T. Evjue, Wisconsin politician and founder of the Capital Times
- Hermann R. Fehland, Wisconsin politician
- William H. Flett, Wisconsin politician
- Daniel E. Freeman, musicologist
- Paul Gebert, Sr., Wisconsin politician
- Leo Gesicki, Wisconsin politician
- James H. Hamlin, Wisconsin politician
- Ralph Dorn Hetzel, tenth president of Pennsylvania State University
- Emil A. Hinz, Wisconsin politician
- Paul Jesperson, basketball player and coach
- Zola Jesus, singer and songwriter
- H. V. Kaltenborn, journalist
- Clarence Kretlow, Wisconsin politician
- Clifford Krueger, Wisconsin politician
- F. W. Kubasta, Wisconsin politician
- Oxie Lane, NFL player
- Myron Hawley McCord, U.S. Representative
- John O'Day, Wisconsin politician
- Fred C. Reger, Wisconsin politician
- Thomas B. Scott, Wisconsin politician
- Donald Edgar Tewes, United States House of Representatives
- Reno W. Trego, Wisconsin politician
- Tom Uttech, artist
- Edward W. Whitson, Wisconsin politician
- James A. Wright, Wisconsin politician

== Images ==
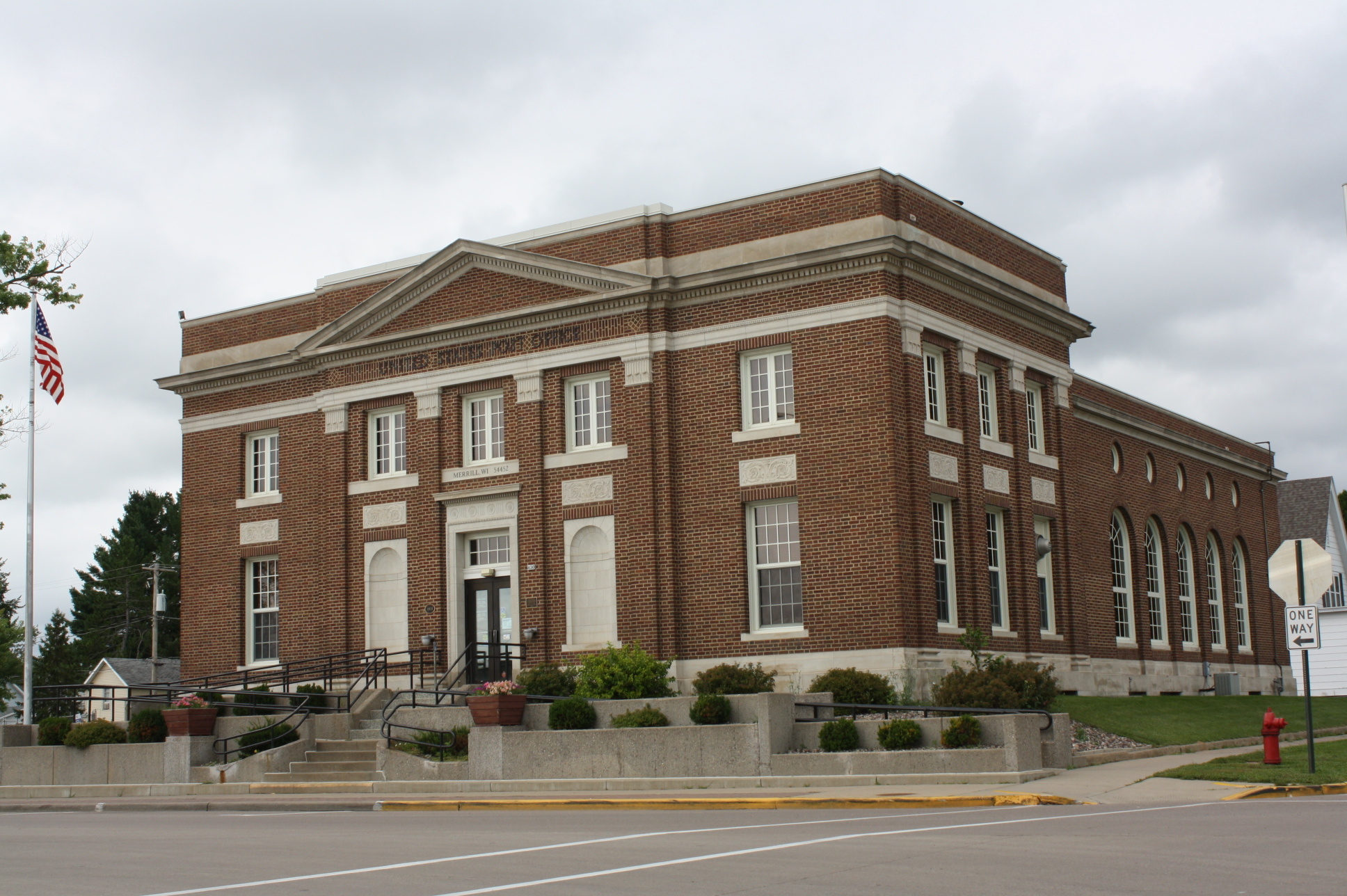
Post office

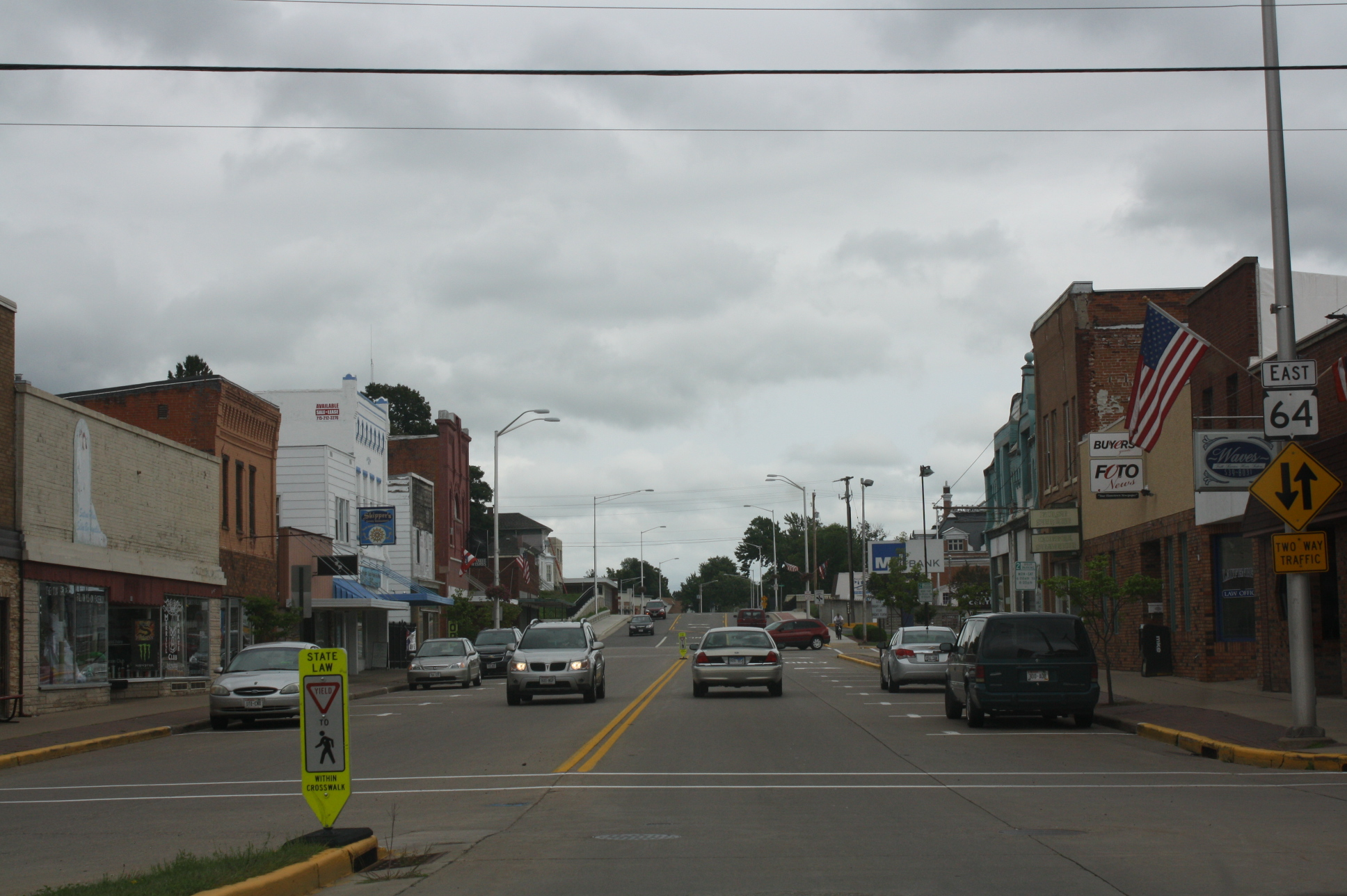
Looking east at the eastern downtown

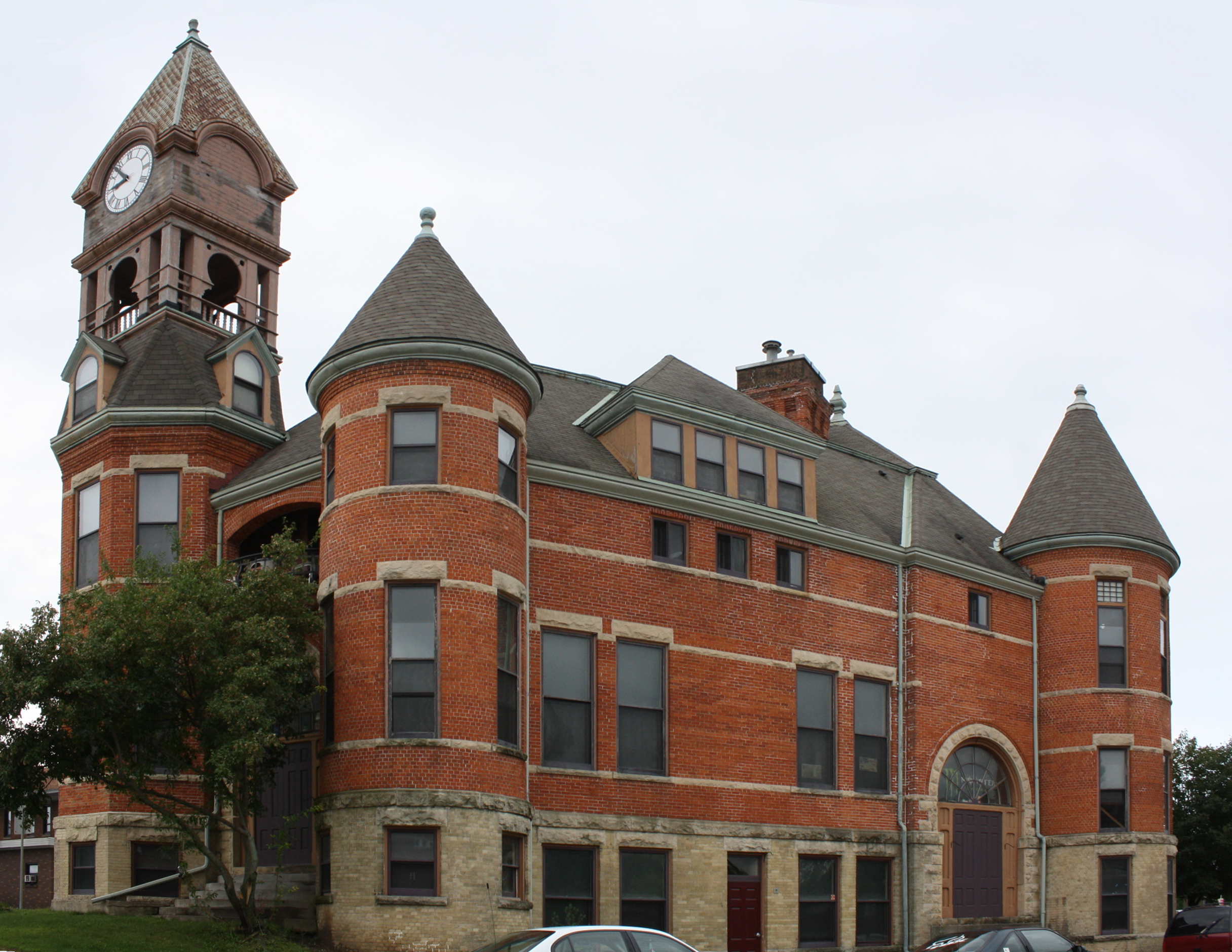
Historic city hall

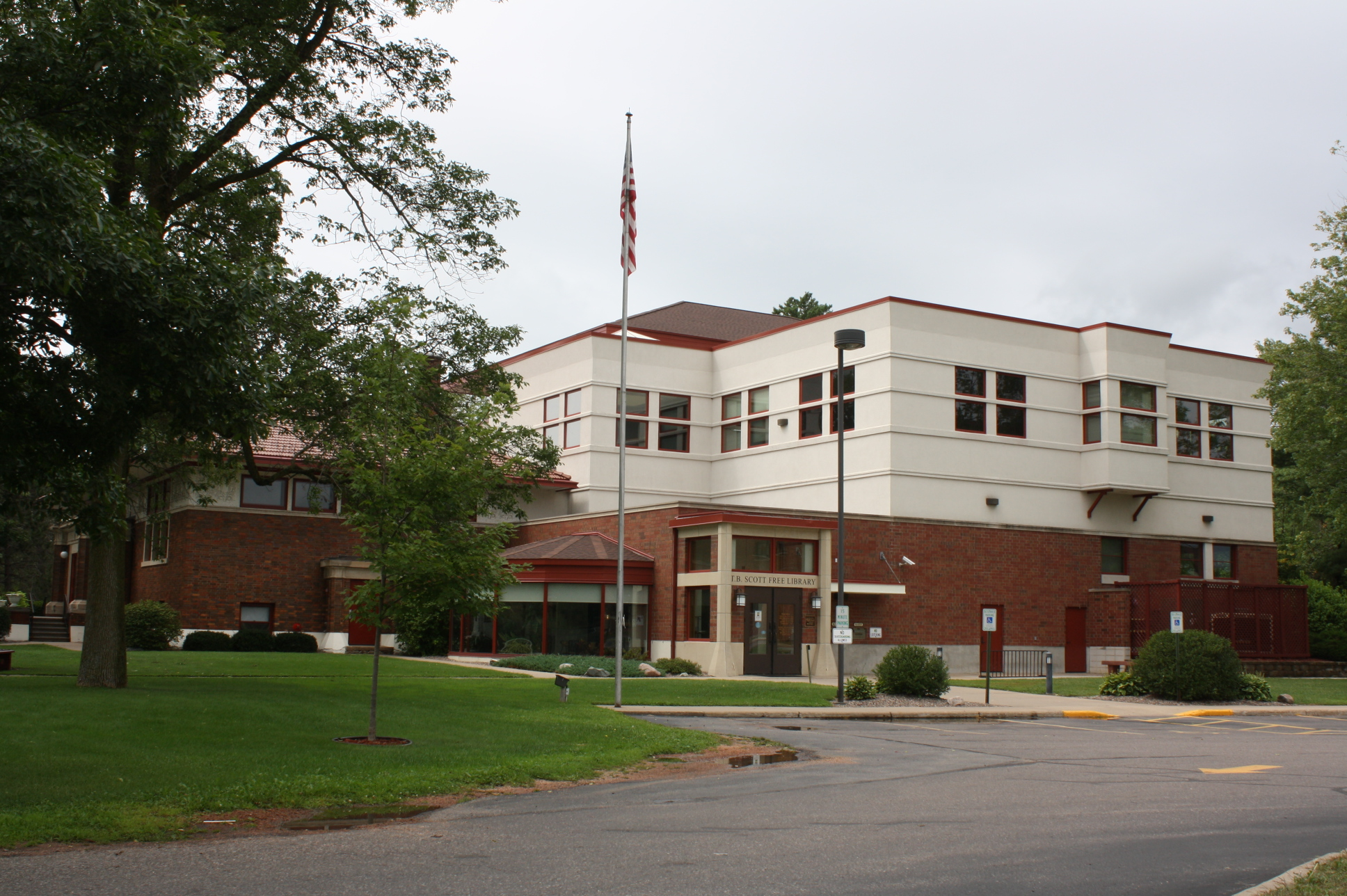
T.B. Scott library

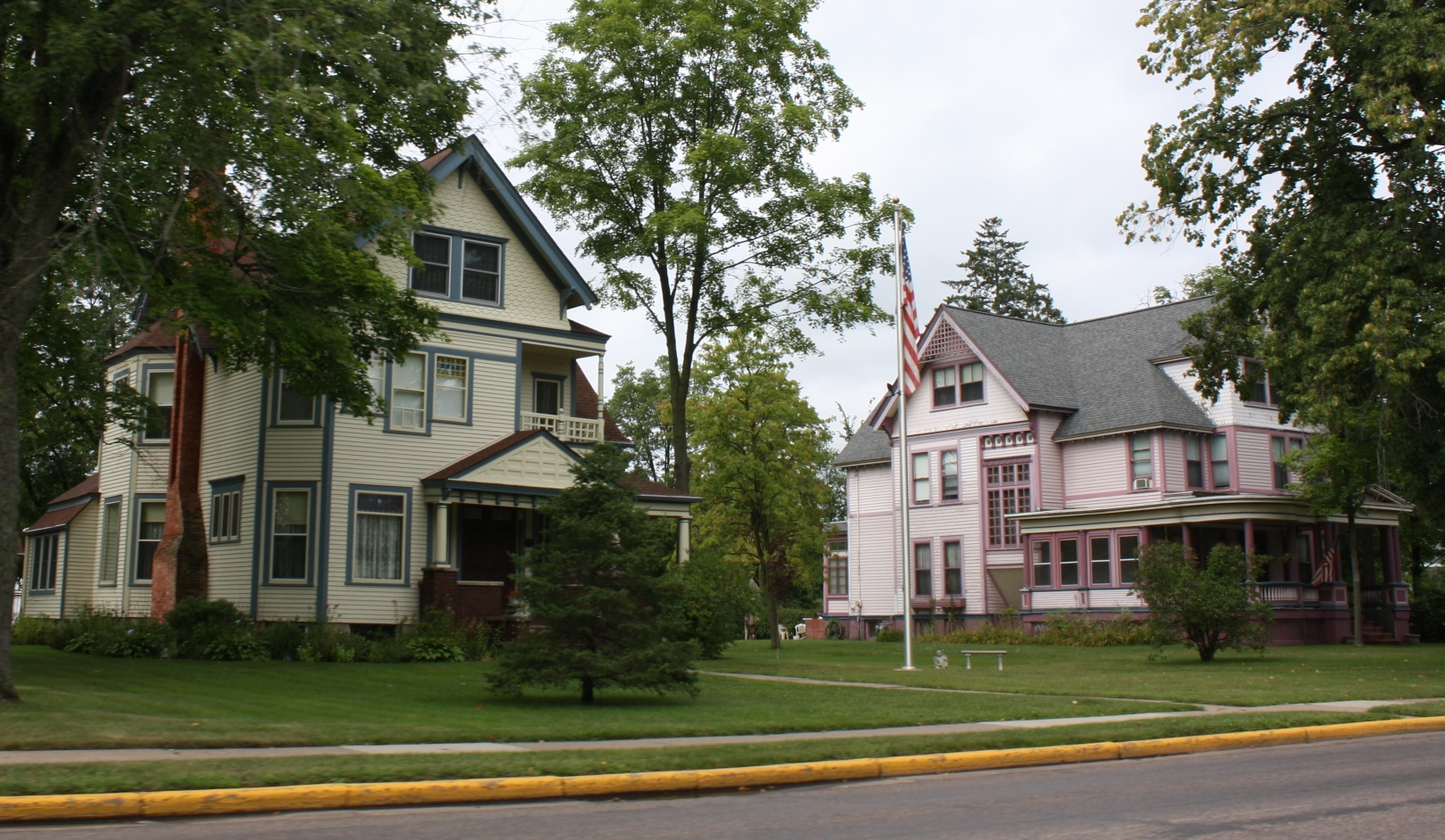
Center Avenue Historic District

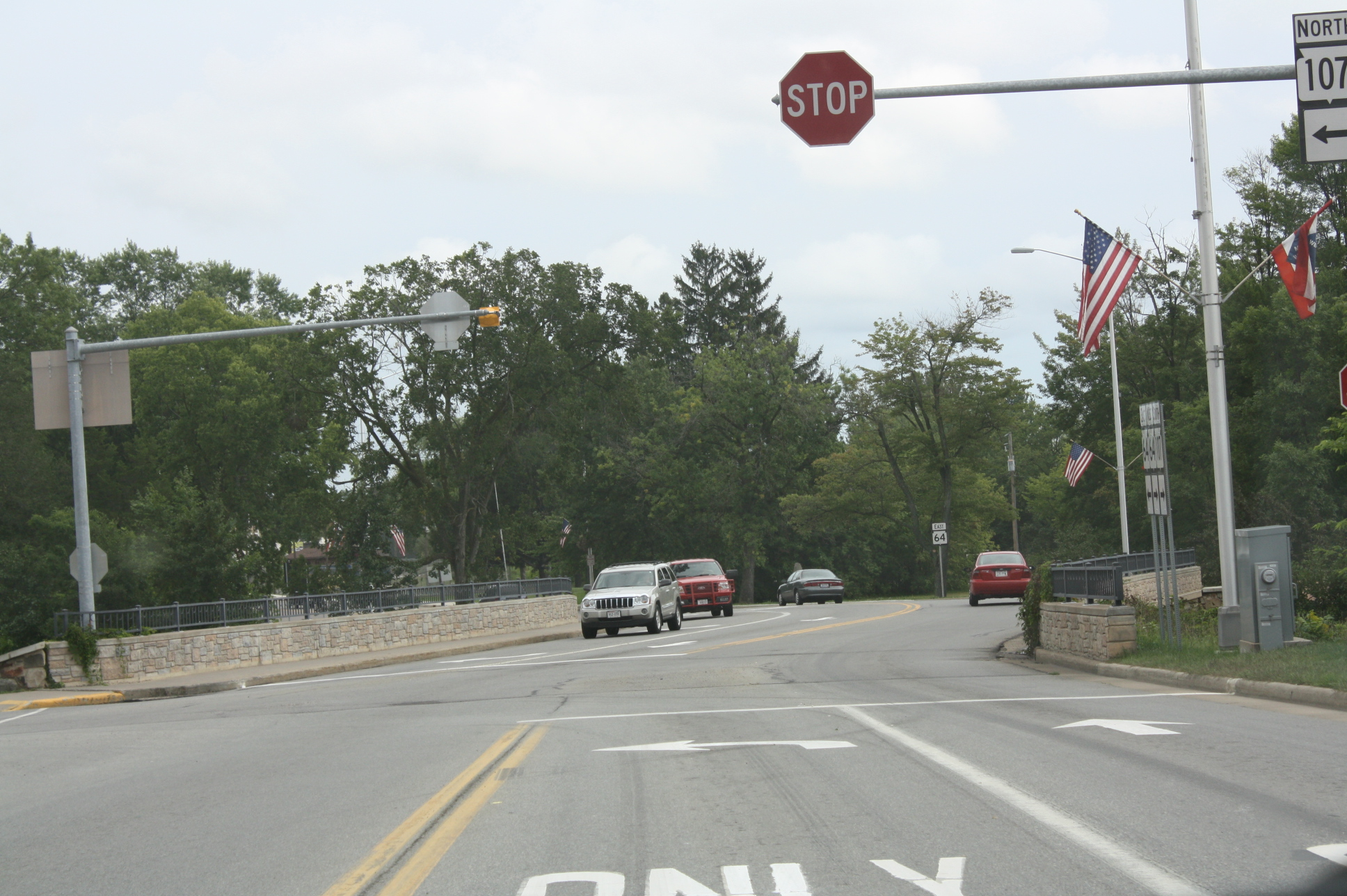
First Street bridge

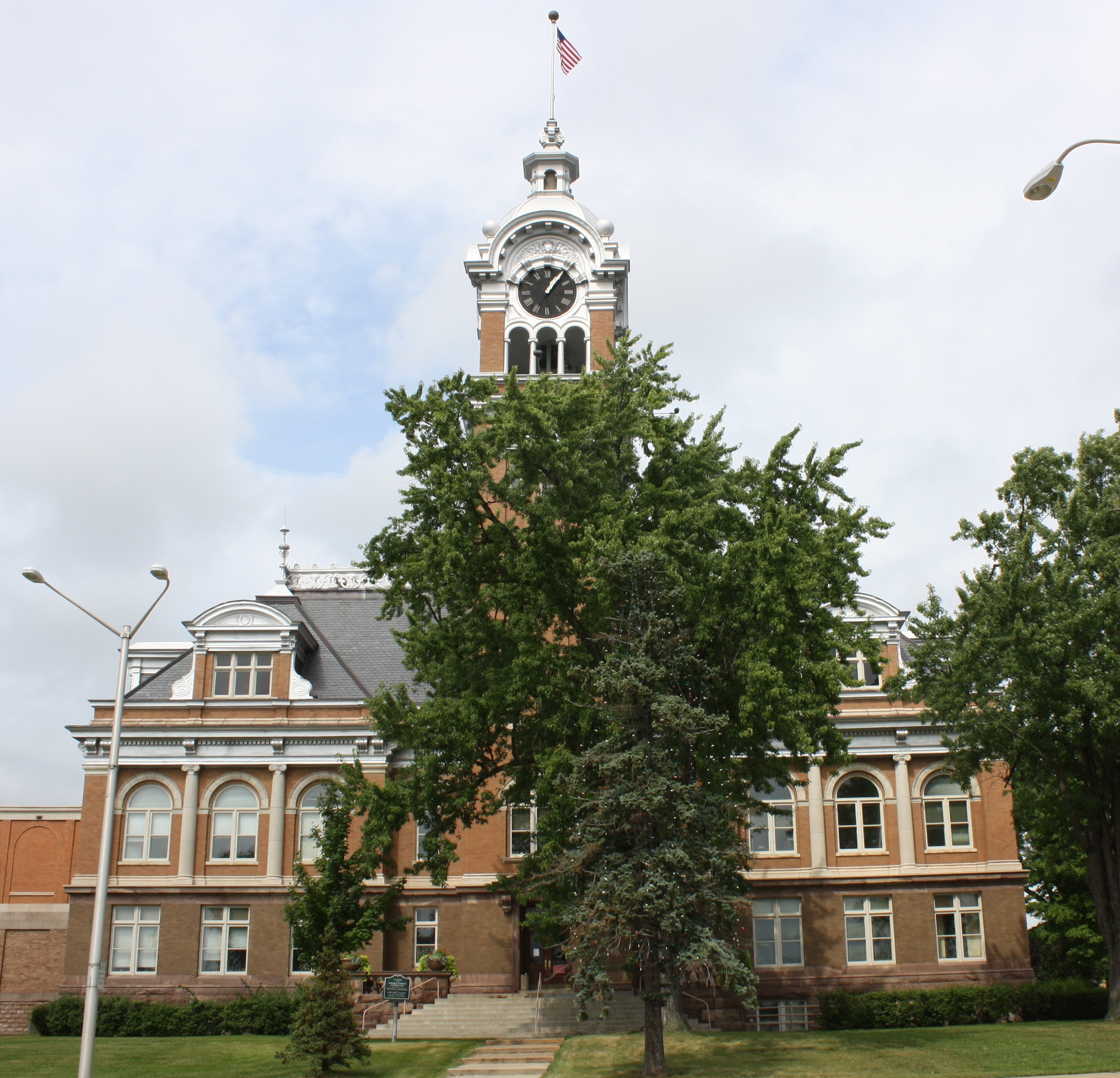
Lincoln County Courthouse
