= Lake Tomahawk =

Lake Tomahawk may refer to places in the United States:

- Lake Tomahawk, Ohio, a census-designated place
- Lake Tomahawk, Wisconsin, a town
- Lake Tomahawk (CDP), Wisconsin, a census-designated place

== See also ==
- Tomahawk (disambiguation)
