= Tomahawk (disambiguation) =

A tomahawk is a type of axe made and used by Native Americans.

Tomahawk may also refer to:

== Places ==
=== Australia ===
- Tomahawk, Tasmania, a town

=== Canada ===
- Tomahawk, Alberta, a hamlet

=== New Zealand ===
- Ocean Grove, New Zealand, formerly called Tomahawk from the Māori toma haka, now a suburb of the city of Dunedin
- Tomahawk Beach, the beach below Ocean Grove
- Tomahawk Lagoon, a coastal lake adjacent to Ocean Grove

=== United States ===
- Tomahawk Township, Searcy County, Arkansas, a township
- Tomahawk, Kentucky, a small community in eastern Kentucky
- Tomahawk, West Virginia, an unincorporated community
- Tomahawk, Wisconsin, a city
- Tomahawk (town), Wisconsin, a town adjacent to the city of the same name
- Tomahawk School District, a school district in Wisconsin
- Lake Tomahawk, Wisconsin, a town
- Lake Tomahawk (community), Wisconsin, an unincorporated community
- Tomahawk River, a river in Wisconsin

== People ==
- Tom Hawkins (footballer, born 1988), an Australian rules footballer, nicknamed "Tomahawk"
- Tomahawk T.T., Takuya Onodera, a Japanese professional wrestler

== Arts, entertainment, and media ==
=== Fictional entities ===
- Tomahawk (character), a DC Comics character, published in his own series from the 1940s to 1970s
- Tomahawk (G.I. Joe), a helicopter in the G.I. Joe universe
- Tomahawk (Transformers), a Transformers character

=== Music ===
- Tomahawk (band), an alternative/experimental band fronted by Mike Patton
- Tomahawk (album), an album by Tomahawk
- Tomahawk Technique, an album by Sean Paul
- "Tomahawk", a single by BT and Adam K

=== Other arts, entertainment, and media ===
- Tomahawk (film) (1951), directed by George Sherman
- Tomahawk (satirical magazine), a weekly magazine (1867–1870)
- Tomahawk (video game), a 1985 video game by Datasoft

== Military ==
- Tomahawk missile, a cruise missile built in the United States
- Curtiss P-40 Warhawk, early variants were named Tomahawk in RAF service
- Nike-Tomahawk, a U.S. sounding rocket
- Operation Tomahawk, an airborne military operation
- Taurus Tomahawk, a two-stage elevator sounding rocket
- TE-416 Tomahawk, a U.S. sounding rocket
- USS Tomahawk (AO-88), a World War II fuel supply ship

== Transportation ==
- Tomahawk (train), a train operated by the Chicago, Milwaukee, St. Paul and Pacific Railroad (the "Milwaukee Road")
- Tomahawk, a children's bicycle similar to the Raleigh Chopper
- Dodge Tomahawk, a concept motorcycle
- ITV Tomahawk, a French paraglider design by ITV Parapentes
- Piper PA-38 Tomahawk, a light general aviation aircraft
- SRT Tomahawk Gran Turismo, a concept car created by SRT for the Gran Turismo series
- Tomahawk Railway, a U.S. railroad

== Sports ==
- Tomahawk chop, a controversial celebratory gesture made by fans of multiple American sports teams

=== Move, plays or shots ===
- Basketball, a one-handed slam dunk, where the ball is brought over the head before being stuffed into the basket, in a chopping motion
- Beach volleyball, an overhead method of contacting the ball
- Field hockey, a type of hit where the hockey stick is turned so that the rounded side faces the ground and then swung in such a way that it hits the ball in a downward chopping motion
- Football/soccer, a name given to Cristiano Ronaldo's direct free kicks
- Pickleball, a tomahawk shot
- Roller skating, a turning maneuver

=== Teams ===
- Johnstown Tomahawks, a Tier II Junior A ice hockey team from Johnstown, Pennsylvania
- Mississauga Tomahawks Jr. A, a Junior "A" box lacrosse team from Mississauga, Ontario
- Tomahawks, the nickname for the United States national rugby league team
- Toronto Tomahawks, a former team in the National Lacrosse League
- Williamsport Tomahawks, a former Class AA Eastern League baseball team in Williamsport, Pennsylvania

== Other uses ==
- Tomahawk (geometry), a mathematical tool that can be used to trisect angles
- Tomahawk (software), a cross-platform music player for Windows, Mac and Linux, see List of Linux audio software
- Tomahawk, a set of Java Server Faces components created by the MyFaces development team prior to its donation to Apache
- A tomahawk steak is a rib steak with the bone attached
- Tomahawk, a series of switching chips at Broadcom Corporation

== See also ==
- Tokamak, a magnetic confinement device, used in nuclear fusion experiments
