= Tom Tiffany =

American politician (born 1957)

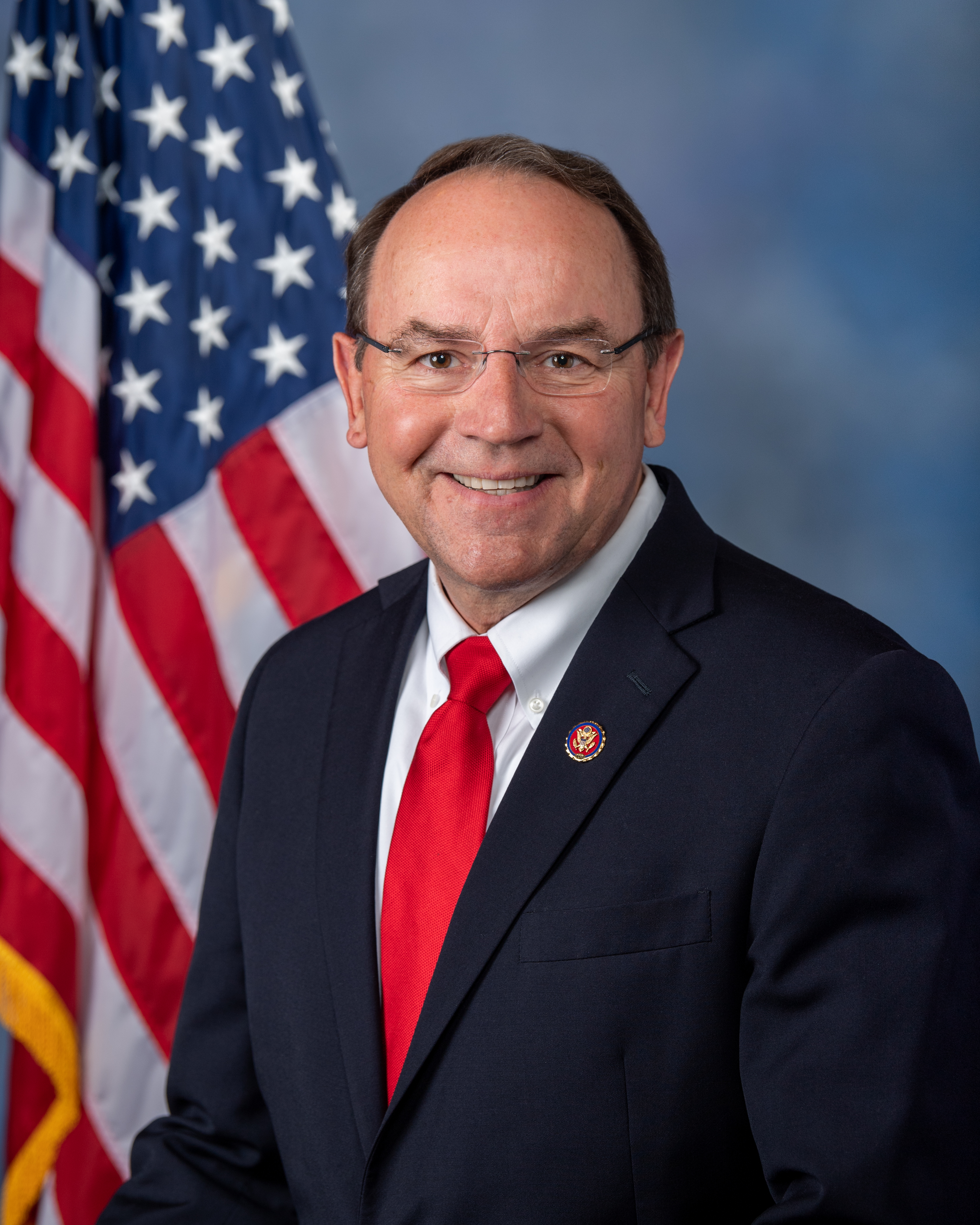
- Official portrait, 2020

Member of the U.S. House of Representatives from Wisconsin's 7th district
- Incumbent
- Assumed office May 12, 2020 (Note: Tiffany's official service begins on the date of the special election, while he was not sworn in until May 19, 2020.)
- Preceded by: Sean Duffy

Member of the Wisconsin Senate from the 12th district
- In office January 7, 2013 – May 18, 2020
- Preceded by: Jim Holperin
- Succeeded by: Mary Felzkowski

Member of the Wisconsin State Assembly from the 35th district
- In office January 3, 2011 – January 7, 2013
- Preceded by: Donald Friske
- Succeeded by: Mary Felzkowski

Personal details
- Born: Thomas Patrick Tiffany; December 30, 1957 (age 68) Wabasha, Minnesota, U.S.
- Party: Republican
- Spouse: Christine Sully
- Children: 3
- Education: University of Wisconsin, River Falls (BS)
- Website: House website Campaign website

Thomas Patrick Tiffany (born December 30, 1957) is an American politician and businessman from Wisconsin. A member of the United States House of Representatives, he has represented Wisconsin's 7th congressional district since 2020. A member of the Republican Party, he is a member of the House Freedom Caucus.

Tiffany worked in business and as the supervisor of the town of Little Rice before his election in 2010 to the Wisconsin State Assembly. Later elected to the Wisconsin State Senate in 2012, he became the chair of the Senate Committee on Sporting Heritage, Mining and Forestry. He was elected to the U.S. House of Representatives following a special election in 2020. In 2026, Tiffany was the Republican nominee for governor of Wisconsin, losing to Democratic nominee David Crowley.

== Early life, education, and career ==
Tiffany was born in Wabasha, Minnesota, and grew up on a dairy farm near Elmwood, Wisconsin, with five brothers and two sisters. He graduated from Elmwood High School in 1976 and earned a Bachelor of Science in agricultural economics from the University of Wisconsin–River Falls in 1980.

Tiffany managed the petroleum division of High Plains Cooperative in Plainview, Minnesota, before moving to Minocqua, Wisconsin, to manage Zenker Oil Company's petroleum distribution in 1988. He and his wife, Chris, operated an excursion business, Wilderness Queen Cruise Line, on the Willow Flowage from 1991 to 2006. They moved the business to the Wisconsin River in Rhinelander in 2007 before they sold the business in 2012.

Tiffany was the supervisor of the town of Little Rice, Wisconsin, from 2009 to 2013, was a dam tender for the Wisconsin Valley Improvement Company, and is a former member of the Oneida County Economic Development Corporation.

== Wisconsin Legislature (2011–2020) ==
In 2004 and 2008, he ran to represent the 12th district in the Wisconsin State Senate, first against Roger Breske, and then Jim Holperin, losing both times.

In 2010, Tiffany ran for the 35th district of the Wisconsin State Assembly after the incumbent, Donald Friske, retired. Tiffany won the primary and defeated Democratic nominee Jay Schmelling, 58.09% to 41.81%.

In 2012, Tiffany chose not to seek reelection to the Assembly and instead to run again for the state senate after Holperin announced he would not run for reelection. He defeated the Democratic nominee Susan Sommer, 56% to 40%, in the general election.

In the state senate, Tiffany was the chair of the chair of the Senate Committee on Sporting Heritage, Mining and Forestry and a member of the Joint Finance Committee. He supported mining operations, advocated more logging, and proposed reduced funding for the Wisconsin Department of Natural Resources. He also had a role in transferring powers over to the Wisconsin Legislature from the Wisconsin Department of Natural Resources on issues like operating rules for controversial dams in Vilas County. Tiffany was proud to earn the enmity of the Wisconsin chapter of the League of Conservation Voters and called organizations such as the Environmental Protection Agency under President Obama "radical."

== U.S. House of Representatives (2020–present) ==
U.S. representative Sean Duffy resigned on September 23, 2019, after his youngest daughter was diagnosed with a heart condition. Tiffany announced that he would run in a special election to succeed him. He won the February 18, 2020, Republican primary and defeated Wausau attorney Tricia Zunker in the May 12, 2020, special election. Tiffany was sworn in on May 19, 2020.

Tiffany defeated Zunker in a rematch in the November 3, 2020, general election taking in 60.7% of the vote.

In June 2021, Tiffany was one of 14 House Republicans to vote against legislation to establish June 19, or Juneteenth, as a federal holiday.

In early 2026, Tiffany introduced legislation to raise the status of Apostle Islands National Lakeshore into a national park.

=== Committee assignments ===
- Committee on the Judiciary
- Committee on Natural Resources

=== Caucus memberships ===
Tiffany is a member of the Freedom Caucus. He is also a member of the following caucuses:

- Republican Study Committee
- Congressional Dairy Farmer Caucus
- Congressional Sportsmen's Caucus
- Congressional Taiwan Caucus
- Congressional Western Caucus

== 2026 gubernatorial campaign ==
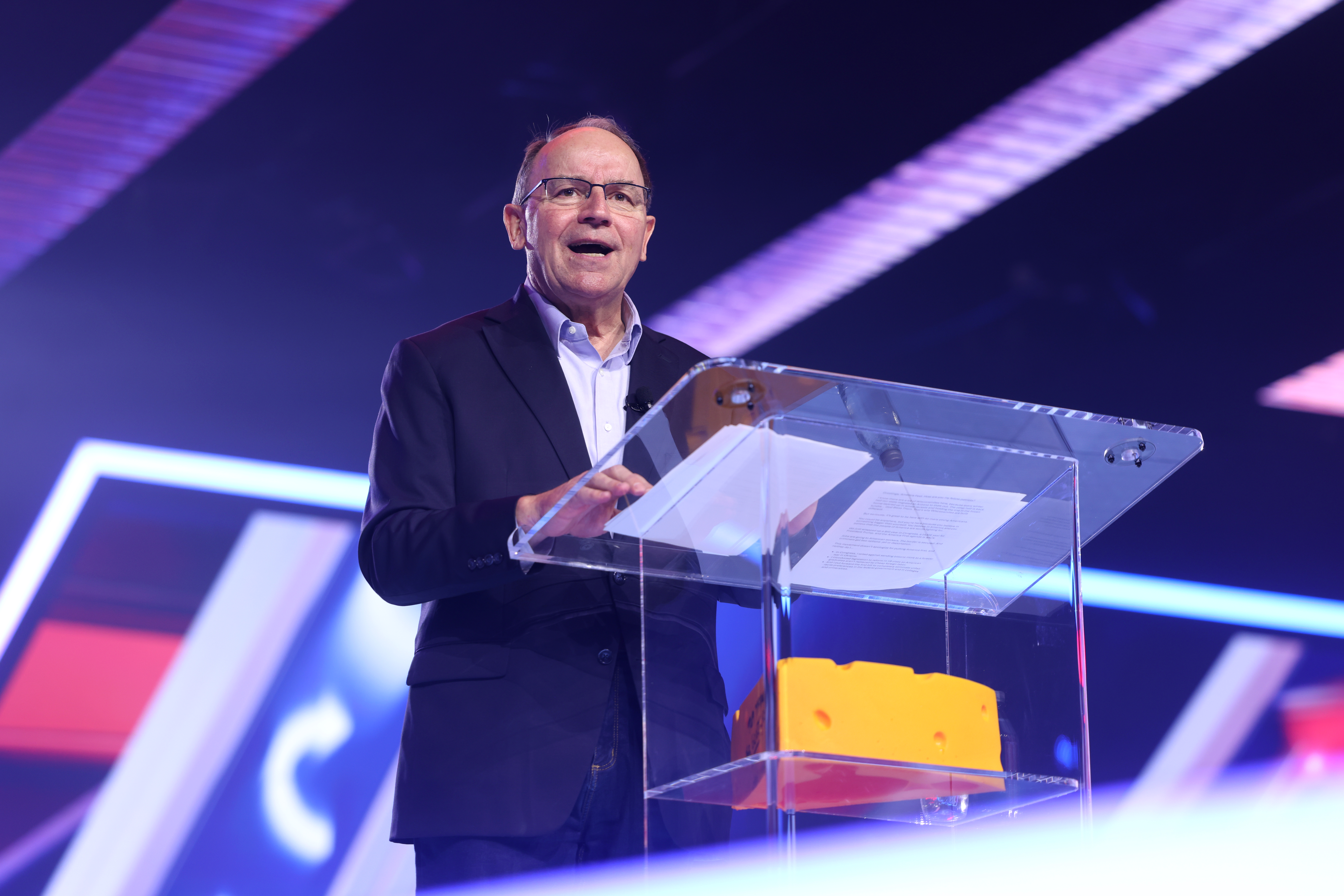
Tiffany speaking at the 2025 AmericaFest convention

On September 23, 2025, Tiffany announced his campaign for governor of Wisconsin in the 2026 election.

He was endorsed by Donald Trump in January 2026. The next day, his main opponent in the primary dropped out of the race. All of Tiffany's Republican colleagues from Wisconsin in the U.S. House of Representatives have endorsed him. Republican strategists have said this allowed Tiffany to avoid rebuilding the party after the primary, noting that the election is for "only the second open gubernatorial seat in the last 60 years in Wisconsin, and there won't be a primary on the Republican side."

In 2026, Tiffany, while campaigning for governor, commented on the Menomonee Falls high school starting a black students' club, by stating that "Race-based preferences are un-American, illegal, and must end." Republican candidate for lieutenant governor Will Martin, an African-American whose mother, Tanya Martin, helped integrate his school in their Tennessee hometown, commented that student clubs must be open to all without discrimination or exclusion.

In July 2026, Tiffany said most election clerks around Wisconsin do good work, "but there's a couple clerks that have fallen down on the job, and we've got to make sure we have election integrity."

In August 2026, Tiffany proposed to have the Wisconsin Department of Natural Resources split, in order to "separate fish, wildlife, hunting, fishing, trapping from the environmental permitting part of it," saying that this would benefit the state's sportsmen.

In September 2026, Tiffany was flying back from a campaign event when the light aircraft he was flying in lost power. The plane made an emergency landing on a lake; as the plane began to take on water, Tiffany and the pilot swam to safety. Tiffany received stitches on his face prior to being released from the hospital.

Tiffany ultimately lost the election to Crowley, conceding less than two hours after polls closed on election day in November 2026. After his concession speech, Tiffany stated that he would remain in Wisconsin but was unsure if he'd remain involved in politics.

== Political positions ==
=== 2020 United States presidential election ===
In his first year in Congress, Tiffany supported Donald Trump's attempts to overturn the 2020 United States presidential election. In December 2020, Tiffany was one of 126 Republican members of the U.S. House of Representatives to sign an amicus brief in support of Texas v. Pennsylvania, a lawsuit filed at the U.S. Supreme Court contesting the results of the 2020 presidential election, in which Joe Biden defeated the incumbent president Donald Trump. The Supreme Court declined to hear the case on the basis that Texas lacked standing under Article III of the Constitution to challenge the results of an election held by another state. Tiffany was also among the 120 House members, all Republicans, who objected to counting Arizona's and Pennsylvania's electoral votes in the 2020 presidential election.

Tiffany supports ongoing efforts to revisit the 2020 election and has supported previous efforts to overturn it. He has said he would have rejected the 2020 vote for Biden in Wisconsin if it had been up to the legislature, and he supported a Texas lawsuit to overturn the 2020 election in various other states.

=== Abortion ===
In September 2025, Tiffany declined to say whether he supported a heartbeat abortion ban such as one he supported during his time in the state legislature. In January 2026, PBS asked him "Would you like to see any changes to Wisconsin's abortion law?" and he answered "No. So, I voted for the current law, which, 10 years ago when I was in the state legislature, which is you can have an abortion up to five months. I voted for that law, and as governor I will uphold it."

=== Foreign policy ===
==== China and Taiwan ====
Tiffany has expressed support for recognition of Taiwan as an independent state. In 2023, Tiffany authored an op-ed in The Washington Times, stating that "the United States should lead by example and end this tired charade." Since being elected to the House, Tiffany has introduced legislation in every session to establish diplomatic relations with Taiwan. In 2024, Tiffany introduced legislation expressing support for Taiwan's full participation at the World Health Organization, as well as legislation restricting the U.S. Department of State from using funds to enforce restrictions on "high-level communications" with Taiwanese officials. Both pieces of legislation were passed by Congress.

==== Russo-Ukrainian war ====
In May 2022, Tiffany "strongly" condemned the 2022 Russian invasion of Ukraine, but did not support a bill for almost $40 billion in additional American funding for Ukraine, stating that American taxpayers should not be financing "an open-ended European conflict."

On March 19, 2024, Tiffany was one of nine Republicans to vote against a resolution condemning the abduction of Ukrainian children into Russia during the Russo-Ukrainian war.

==== Israel ====
After the October 7 attacks, Tiffany said he firmly supported Israel and would not support a ceasefire until "Hamas has been neutralized by Israel". In 2023, he voted in favor of a Republican-led House bill that would provide $14 billion in aid to Israel.

When asked why he supports foreign aid to Israel but not Ukraine, Tiffany said he trusted Israel to responsibly use aid but he does not feel the same way about Ukraine.

==== War powers ====
In June 2021, Tiffany was one of 49 House Republicans who voted to repeal the Authorization for Use of Military Force Against Iraq Resolution of 2002.

In March 2023, Tiffany was among 47 Republicans to vote in favor of House Congressional Resolution 21, which directed President Joe Biden to remove U.S. troops from Syria within 180 days. In June, Tiffany was among 71 members who voted against final passage of the Fiscal Responsibility Act of 2023 in the House. Tiffany has supported some efforts for infrastructure in his district. In September 2023, he joined a bipartisan group of legislators to request a replacement for the Blatnik Bridge connecting Duluth, Minnesota and Superior, Wisconsin. The U.S. Department of Transportation under Joe Biden granted $1 billion to this project.

In May 2026, Tiffany voted against an Iran war powers resolution. The resolution was intended to limit the 2026 Iran war, directing President Trump to remove the U.S. military from the conflict, until congressional consent had been obtained. Tiffany said about his vote, "I think most Americans agree that it's reasonable to want things to start winding down in Iran, while also recognizing that it is unreasonable to undermine the president's role as commander-in-chief."

=== Tariffs ===
In January 2025, at a listening session in Rice Lake, Wisconsin, Tiffany spoke in approval of tariffs in the second Trump administration, saying that they are "very strategic, very targeted and ultimately they are meant to benefit the American people". In 2025, Tiffany stated "we clearly have not had fair trade here in America."

== Personal life ==
Tiffany and his wife, Christine, have three children. The Tiffanys are Protestant.

== Electoral history ==
=== Wisconsin Senate (2004, 2008) ===
Wisconsin Senate, 12th District Election, 2004
Party	Candidate	Votes	%	±%
Republican Primary Election, September 14, 2004
Republican	Tom Tiffany	8,910	60.44%	
Republican	Gary Baier	2,998	20.34%	
Republican	William E. Raduege	2,828	19.19%	
	Scattering	5	0.03%	
Total votes		14,740	100.0%	
General Election, November 2, 2004
Democratic	Roger Breske (incumbent)	47,287	53.47%	
Republican	Tom Tiffany	41,119	46.49%	
	Scattering	38	0.04%	
Plurality		6,168	6.97%	
Total votes		88,444	100.0%	
Democratic hold				

Wisconsin Senate, 12th District Election, 2008
Party	Candidate	Votes	%	±%
General Election, November 4, 2008
Democratic	Jim Holperin	85,125	66.11%	+12.64%
Republican	Tom Tiffany	43,595	33.85%	−12.64%
	Scattering	50	0.04%	
Plurality		41,530	32.25%	+25.28%
Total votes		128,770	100.0%	+45.59%
Democratic hold				

=== Wisconsin Assembly (2010) ===
Wisconsin Assembly, 35th District Election, 2010
Party	Candidate	Votes	%	±%
Republican Primary Election, September 14, 2010
Republican	Tom Tiffany	3,708	63.77%	
Republican	Jeremy Cordova	2,107	36.23%	
	Scattering	0	0.00%	
Total votes		5,815	100.0%	
General Election, November 2, 2010
Republican	Tom Tiffany	11,830	58.09%	
Democratic	Jay Schmelling	8,515	41.81%	
	Scattering	21	0.10%	
Plurality		3,315	16.28%	+2.79%
Total votes		20,366	100.0%	
Republican hold				

=== Wisconsin Senate (2012, 2016) ===
Wisconsin Senate, 12th District Election, 2012
Party	Candidate	Votes	%	±%
General Election, November 6, 2012
Republican	Tom Tiffany	51,176	56.24%	+22.39%
Democratic	Susan Sommer	36,809	40.45%	−25.65%
Independent	Paul O. Ehlers	2,964	3.26%	
	Scattering	45	0.05%	
Plurality		14,367	15.79%	-16.46%
Total votes		90,994	100.0%	-29.34%
Republican gain from Democratic				

=== U.S. House of Representatives (2020–present) ===
Wisconsin's 7th congressional district special election, 2020
Party	Candidate	Votes	%	±%
Republican Primary Election, February 18, 2020
Republican	Tom Tiffany	43,714	57.44%	
Republican	Jason Church	32,339	42.50%	
Republican	Michael Opela (write-in)	18	0.02%	
	Scattering	29	0.04%	
Total votes		76,100	100.0%	
Special Election, May 12, 2020
Republican	Tom Tiffany	109,592	57.22%	−2.89%
Democratic	Tricia Zunker	81,928	42.78%	+4.27%
Plurality		27,664	14.44%	-7.16%
Total votes		191,520	100.0%	-40.68%
Republican hold				

Wisconsin's 7th congressional district, 2020
Party	Candidate	Votes	%
Republican	Tom Tiffany (incumbent)	252,048	60.7
Democratic	Tricia Zunker	162,741	39.2
Write-in		218	0.1
Total votes		415,007	100.0
Republican hold			

Wisconsin's 7th congressional district, 2022
Party	Candidate	Votes	%
Republican	Tom Tiffany (incumbent)	209,224	61.8
Democratic	Richard Ausman	128,877	38.1
Write-in		167	0.1
Total votes		338,268	100.0
Republican hold			

Wisconsin's 7th congressional district, 2024
Party	Candidate	Votes	%
Republican	Tom Tiffany (incumbent)	273,553	63.6
Democratic	Kyle Kilbourn	156,524	36.4
Write-in		307	0.1
Total votes		430,384	100.0
Republican hold			

U.S. House of Representatives
Preceded by Sean Duffy	Member of the U.S. House of Representatives from Wisconsin's 7th congressional district 2020–present	Incumbent
Party political offices
Preceded by Tim Michels	Republican nominee for Governor of Wisconsin; 2026	Most recent
U.S. order of precedence (ceremonial)
Preceded by Greg Murphy	United States representatives by seniority 236th	Succeeded by Claudia Tenney
