= Wisconsin's 35th Assembly district =

American legislative district in northern Wisconsin

Wisconsin's 35th State Assembly district
- 2024 map defined in 2023 Wisc. Act 94; 2022 map defined in Johnson v. Wisconsin Elections Commission; 2011 map was defined in 2011 Wisc. Act 43
Assemblymember
Calvin Callahan; R–Wilson
since January 4, 2021 (5 years)
- Demographics: 94.73% White; 0.51% Black; 1.52% Hispanic; 0.78% Asian; 1.75% Native American; 0.07% Hawaiian/Pacific Islander
- Population (2020) • Voting age: 59,891; 48,377
- Website: Official website
- Notes: Northern Wisconsin

The 35th Assembly district of Wisconsin is one of 99 districts in the Wisconsin State Assembly. Located in northern Wisconsin, the district comprises all of Lincoln and Langlade counties, and parts of northern Oconto County, northwest Shawano County, southern Oneida County, and northern Marathon County. It includes the cities of Antigo, Merrill, and Tomahawk, and the villages of Aniwa, Eland, Maine, Mattoon, and White Lake. It also contains the Council Grounds State Park and about a quarter of the Nicolet National Forest. The district is represented by Republican Calvin Callahan, since January 2021.

The 35th Assembly district is located within Wisconsin's 12th Senate district, along with the 34th and 36th Assembly districts.

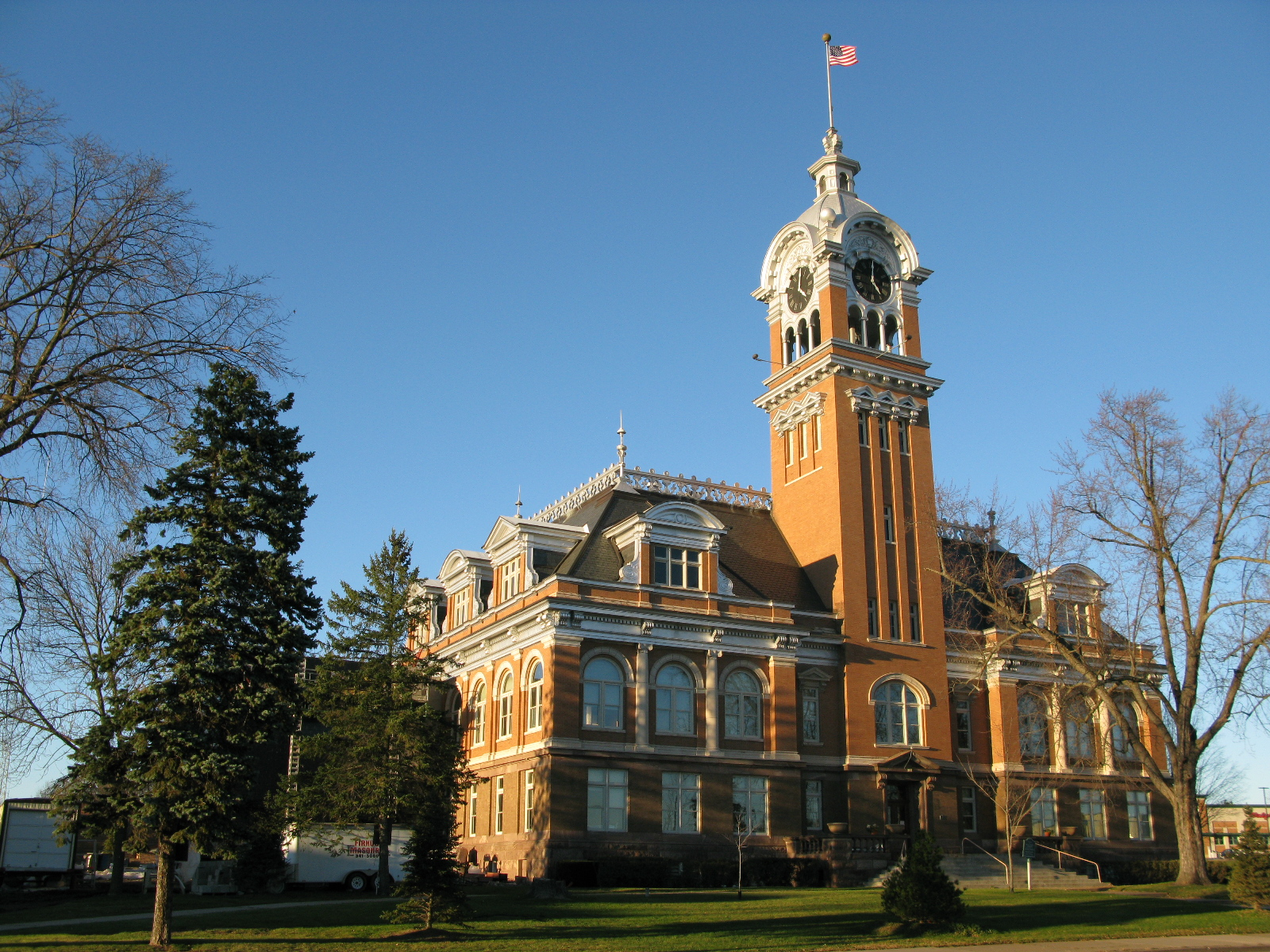
Historic Lincoln County Courthouse in Merrill

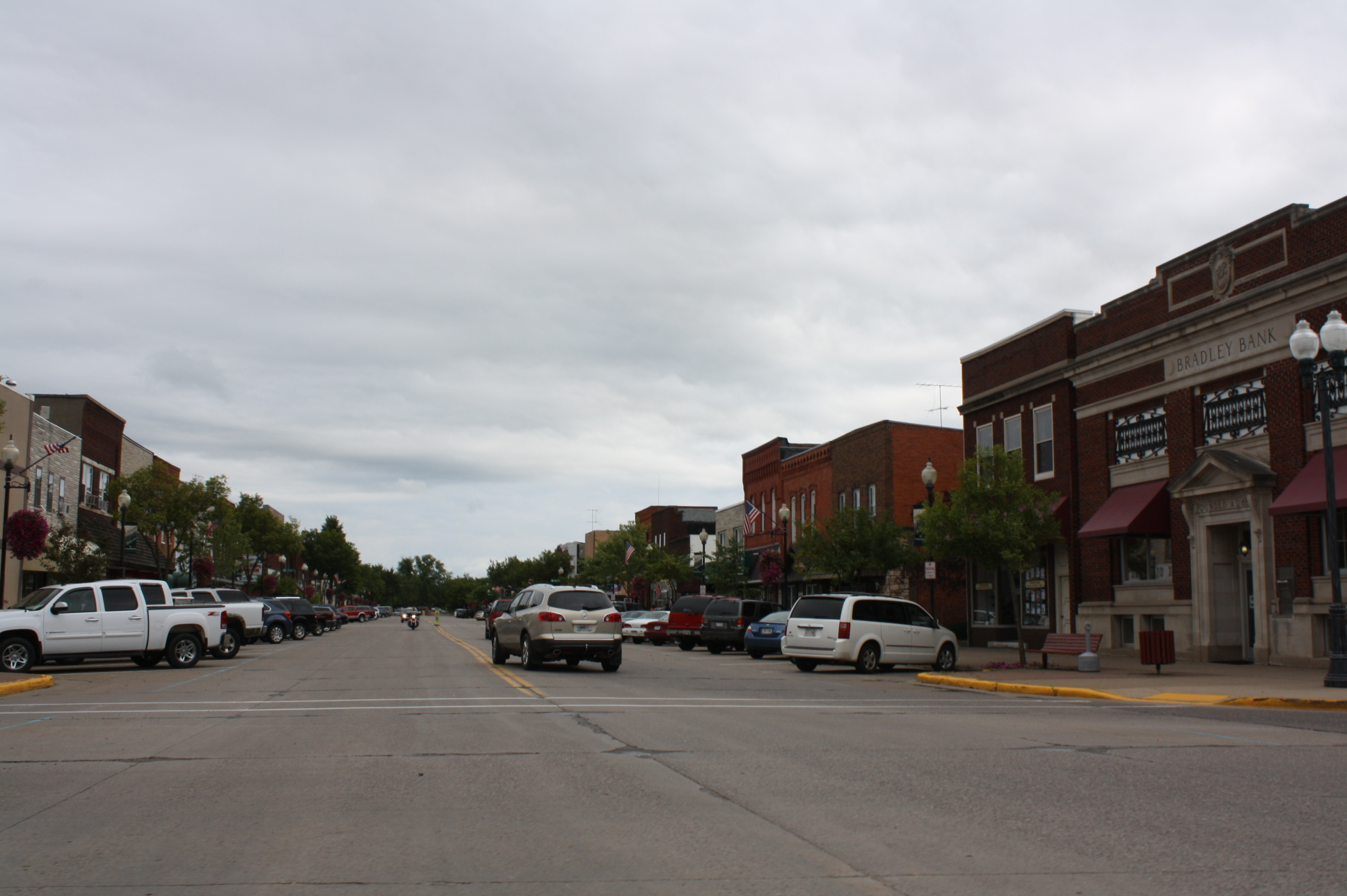
Downtown Tomahawk

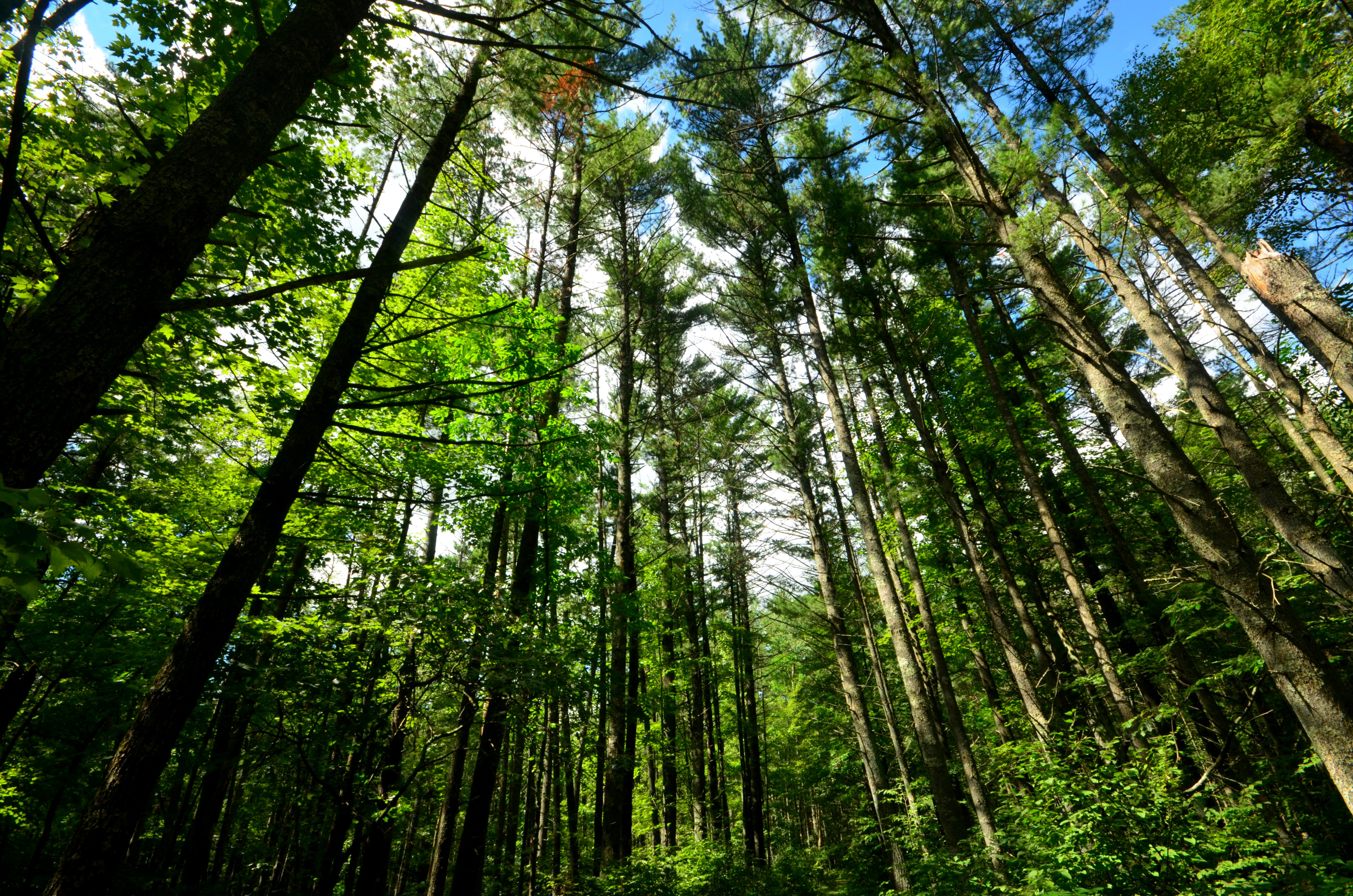
Pine forest within Council Grounds State Park

== List of past representatives ==
List of representatives to the Wisconsin State Assembly from the 35th district
Member	Party	Residence	Counties represented	Term start	Term end	Ref.
District created
Sheehan Donoghue	Rep.	Lublin	Langlade, Lincoln, Oneida,	January 1, 1973	January 3, 1983	
Virgil Roberts	Dem.	Holmen	La Crosse, Monroe	January 3, 1983	January 7, 1985	
Thomas D. Ourada	Rep.	Antigo	Langlade, Lincoln, Marathon, Shawano	January 7, 1985	January 29, 1999	
--Vacant--			Langlade, Lincoln, Marathon, Shawano	January 29, 1999	May 12, 1999	
Sarah Waukau	Dem.	Antigo	Langlade, Lincoln, Marathon, Shawano	May 12, 1999	January 1, 2001	
Donald Friske	Rep.	Merrill	Langlade, Lincoln, Marathon, Oneida, Shawano	January 1, 2001	January 3, 2011	
Tom Tiffany	Rep.	Hazelhurst	Langlade, Lincoln, Marathon, Oneida, Shawano	January 3, 2011	January 7, 2013	
Mary Felzkowski	Rep.	Irma	Langlade, Lincoln, Marathon, Oneida, Shawano	January 7, 2013	January 4, 2021	
Calvin Callahan	Rep.	Wilson	Langlade, Lincoln, Marathon, Oneida, Shawano	January 4, 2021	Current	
Calvin Callahan	Rep.	Wilson	Langlade, Lincoln, Marathon, Oconto, Oneida, Shawano	January 4, 2021	Current	
