= Calvin Callahan =

American Republican politician (born 1999)

Member of the Wisconsin State Assembly from the 35th district
- Incumbent
- Assumed office January 4, 2021
- Preceded by: Mary Felzkowski

Personal details
- Born: March 2, 1999 (age 27) Lincoln County, Wisconsin, U.S.
- Party: Republican
- Education: University of Wisconsin, Stevens Point (attended); University of Wisconsin, Madison (BS)
- Website: Campaign website

Calvin Callahan (born March 2, 1999) is an American Republican politician. He serves as a member of the Wisconsin State Assembly, representing the 35th Assembly district. His district comprises Lincoln County, western Langlade County, and neighboring towns in Marathon, Oneida, and Shawano counties, in north-central Wisconsin. He also serves as a Lincoln County Board of Supervisors member, first elected in 2018, and a supervisor of the town of Wilson.

== Early life and education ==
A native of Tomahawk, Wisconsin, Callahan graduated from Tomahawk High School in 2017. In 2023, he enrolled at the University of Wisconsin–Stevens Point, where he completed general education courses and is now enrolled at University of Wisconsin Madison for Political Science, Economics, and Pre-Law. Representative Callahan also holds certification as a Certified Nursing Assistant.

== Career ==
In 2017 and 2018, Callahan worked as an intern in the office of Congressman Sean Duffy. After graduating from high school, Callahan worked as a field organizer and regional field director for the Republican Party of Wisconsin. Callahan was elected to the Lincoln County Board of Supervisors in April 2018, defeating incumbent Kirby Crosby. He was reelected in 2020 without opposition.

On the County Board, Callahan served on the Administrative and Legislative committee, which oversees county operations, and the Land Services committee, which manages zoning issues. Callahan has been active with the county's Economic Development division, and serves as Lincoln County's sole representative on the regional Central Wisconsin Economic Development Board.

After incumbent representative Mary Felzkowski opted not to seek re-election to the Wisconsin State Assembly and instead run for the Wisconsin State Senate, Callahan announced his candidacy to succeed her. He defeated Don Nelson in the Republican primary and Democratic nominee Tyler Ruprecht in the November general election. At age 21 when elected, he was one of the youngest members of the Assembly.

== Personal life ==
Callahan resides in rural Wilson, Lincoln County, Wisconsin, near the unincorporated community of McCord, Wisconsin, on the border with Oneida County. He is a member of the National Rifle Association of America, the Somo Fish and Game Club, the Wisconsin Bear Hunters Association, Wisconsin Trappers Association, Somo ATV Club, and the Wisconsin ATV/UTV Association.

== Electoral history ==
=== Lincoln County Board (2018, 2020) ===
Year	Election	Date	Elected				Defeated				Total	Plurality
2018	General	Apr. 3	Calvin Callahan	Nonpartisan	87	58.39%	Kirby Crosby (inc)	Non.	62	41.61%	149	25
2020	General	Apr. 7	Calvin Callahan (inc)	Nonpartisan	297	99.00%	--Unopposed--				300	294

=== Wisconsin Assembly (2020–present) ===
Year	Election	Date	Elected				Defeated				Total	Plurality
2020	Primary	Aug. 11	Calvin Callahan	Republican	4,446	72.01%	Donald Nelson	Rep.	1,726	27.96%	6,174	2,720
2020	General	Nov. 3	Calvin Callahan	Republican	20,913	65.31%	Tyler E. Ruprecht	Dem.	11,105	34.68%	32,020	9,808
2022	General	Nov. 8	Calvin Callahan (inc)	Republican	19,481	69.79%	Todd Frederick	Ind.	8,403	30.10%	27,913	11,078
2024	Primary	Aug. 13	Calvin Callahan (inc)	Republican	6,867	84.64%	Todd Mayr	Rep.	1,238	15.26%	8,113	5,629
2024	General	Nov. 5	Calvin Callahan (inc)	Republican	24,421	67.73%	Elizabeth McCrank	Dem.	11,616	32.22%	36,056	12,805
