= Squirrel River (Wisconsin) =

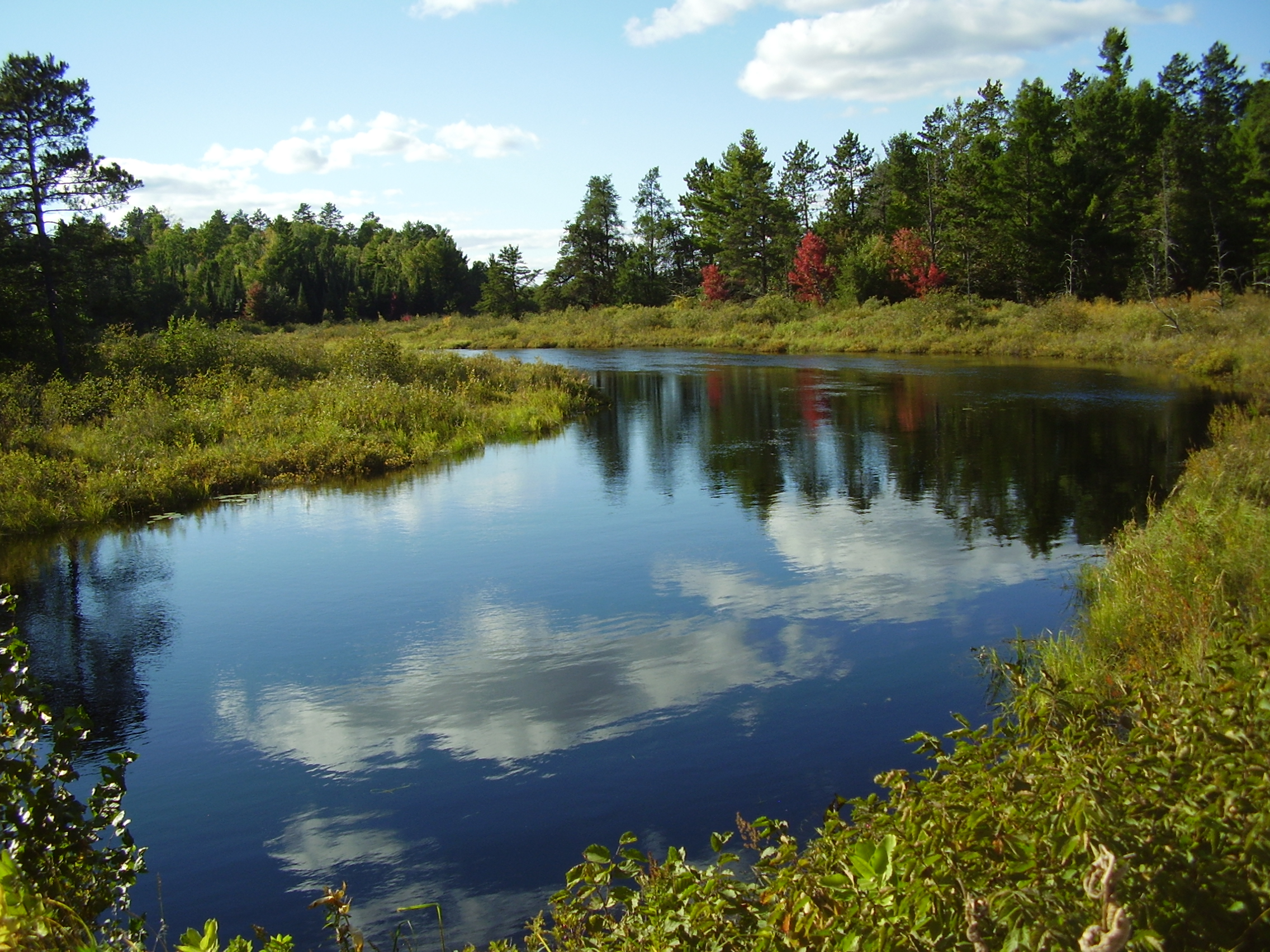
- Squirrel River from Scotchman Lake Road bridge.

Physical characteristics
- Source
  - coordinates: 45.843565°N 89.903763°W
- Mouth
  - coordinates: 45.819676°N 89.813760°W
  - elevation: 1,545 feet (471 m)

The Squirrel River is a river in Oneida County, Wisconsin, which arises in Squirrel Lake and empties into the Tomahawk River a few miles upstream from the Willow Reservoir. The Squirrel River was an important part of a trade and travel route for Indians and non-Indians in the fur trade era. Using canoes in the summer and dog sleds in the winter, travelers would use the river, Squirrel Lake, and a short land portage to travel between Lac du Flambeau and the Tomahawk River. The Tomahawk River, connecting with the Wisconsin River, formed one long north-south route.

The Squirrel River travels through the Squirrel River Pines State Natural Area, a 363-acre stand of mostly large red pines (Pinus resinosa). The recreation area is managed by the Wisconsin Department of Natural Resources.
