= Lake Mohawksin =

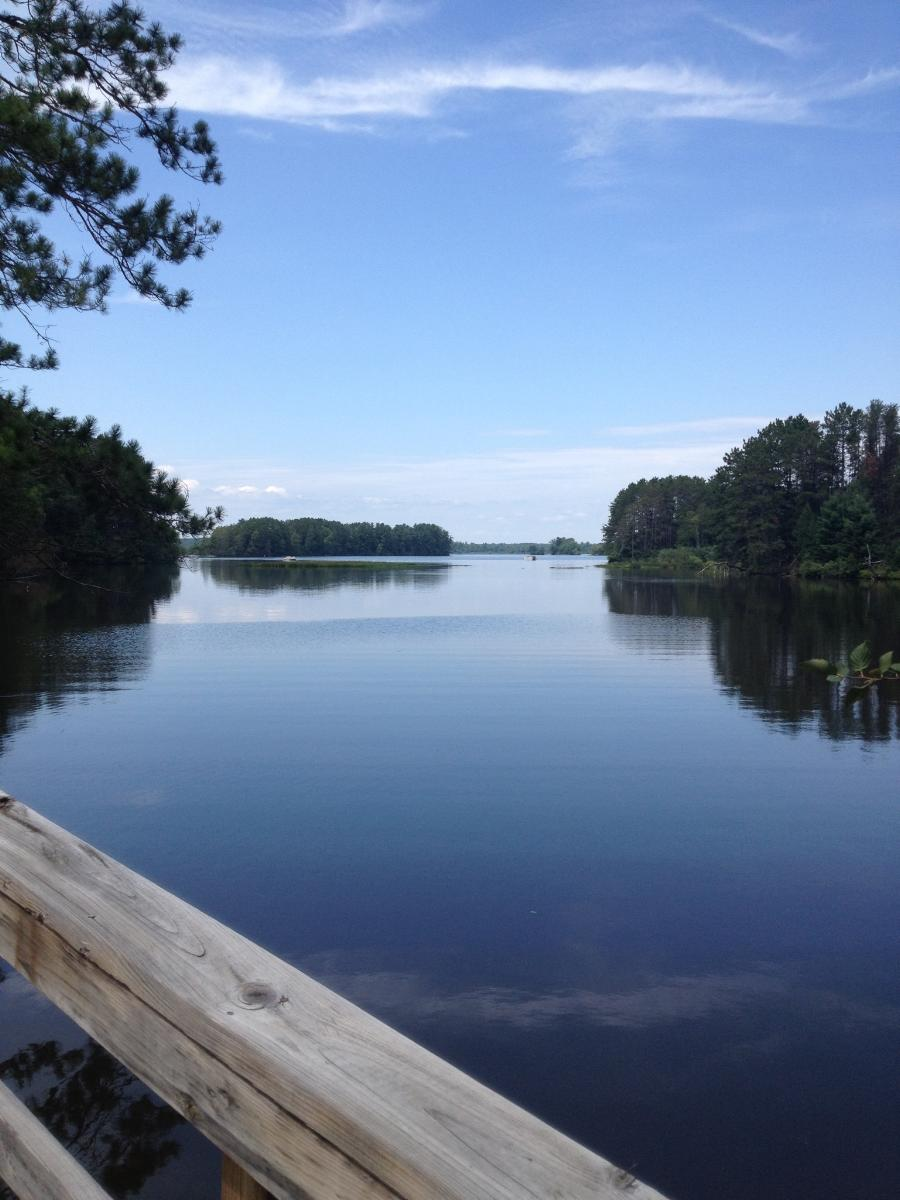
- Lake Mohawksin near Bradley Park.

- Location within Wisconsin Location within the United States
- Location: Lincoln County, Wisconsin, United States
- Coordinates: 45°28′31″N 89°45′32″W
- Basin countries: United States
- Surface area: 1,515 acres (613 ha)
- Max. depth: 25 ft (7.6 m)
- Surface elevation: 1,437 ft (438 m)

Lake Mohawksin is the name of the reservoir on the Wisconsin River formed by the Tomahawk Dam. The dam is located about one mile south of the city limits of Tomahawk, Wisconsin. Lake Mohawksin was originally called Lake Tomahawk, but the name was changed to avoid confusion with the town of Lake Tomahawk as well as the lake near that town (which is actually called Tomahawk Lake). The name Mohawksin is derived from a concatenation of the last syllables of the three rivers which flow into it – the Somo, the Tomahawk and the Wisconsin. The name came via a contest won by Herbert Atcherson in 1926.

The lake has an area of 1,515 acres (613 ha), and a maximum depth of 25 feet (7.6 m). There are 6 public boat landings, and the lake features northern pike, walleyed pike and muskellunge fishing. The dam is owned by the Wisconsin Public Service Corporation.

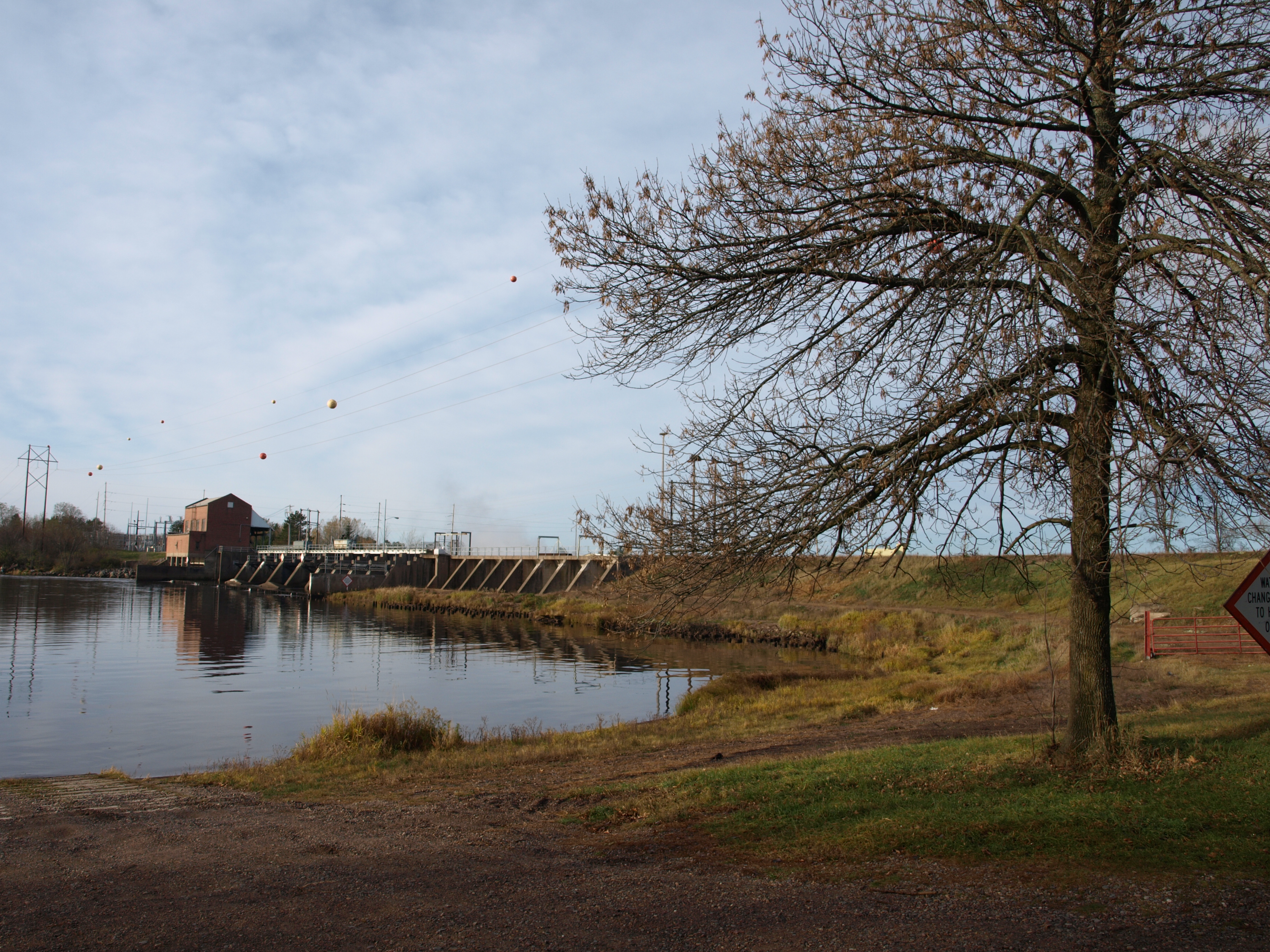
The main part of the Tomahawk Dam, which creates Lake Mohawksin, viewed from down stream.

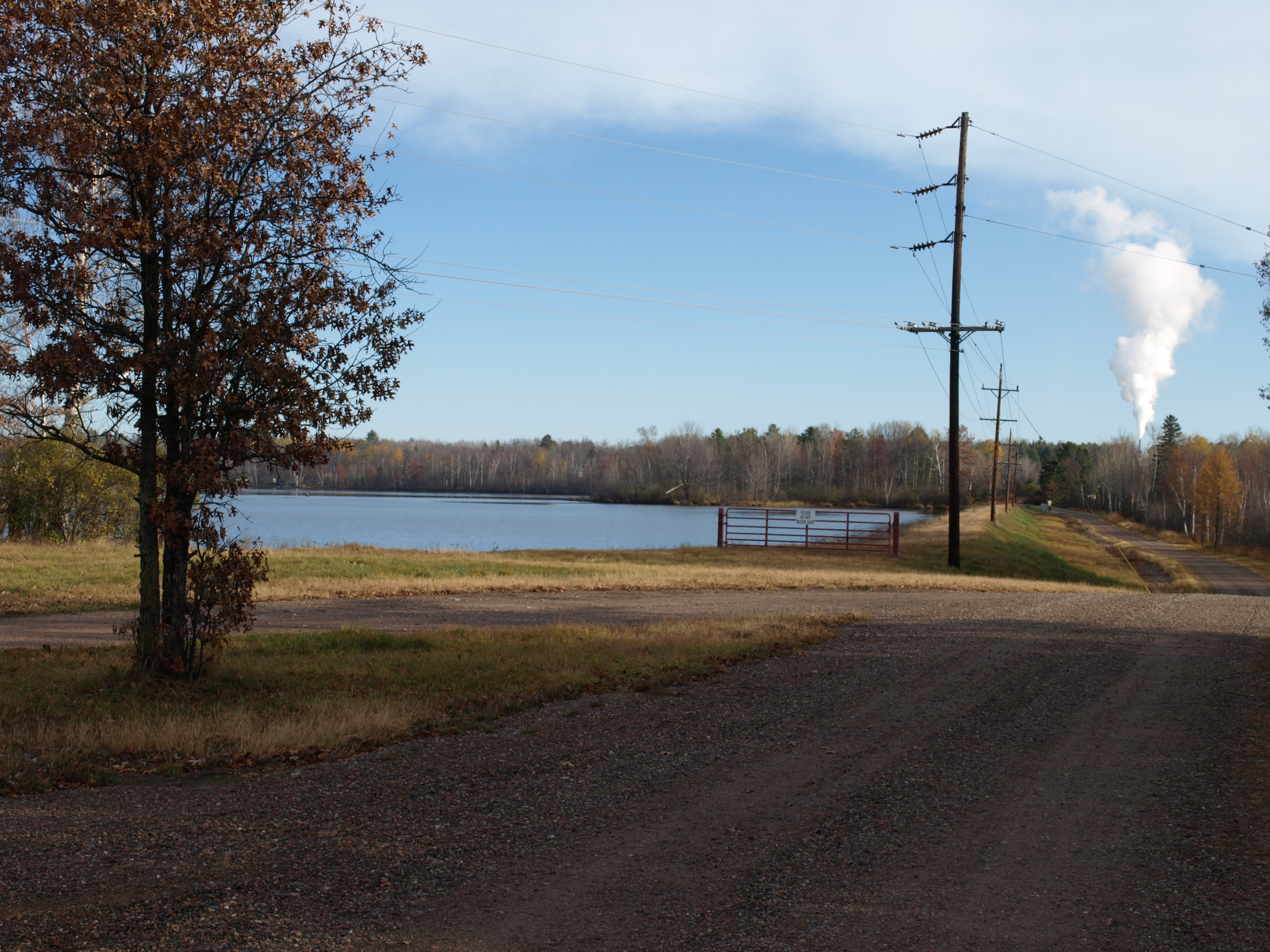
The eastern wing dam of the Tomahawk Dam, which creates Lake Mohawksin.

== See also ==
- List of lakes in Wisconsin
