= USS Accohanoc =

Tugboat of the United States Navy

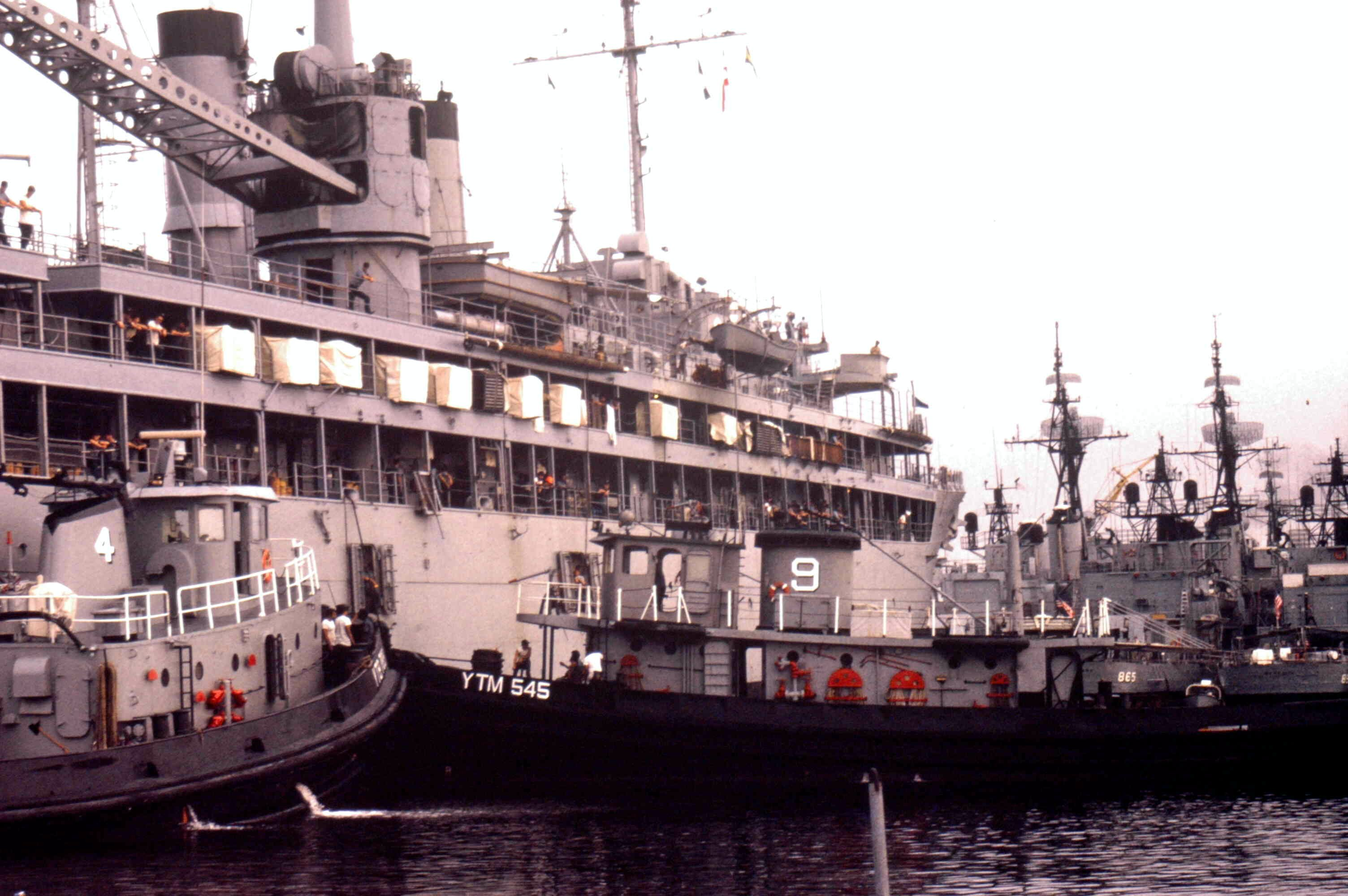
- Naval Station Mayport, Florida, tugs Accohanoc (YTM-545) and Tomahawk, alongside Yosemite 1973. Note the two destroyers in the background, one of which is Charles R. Ware.

History

United States
- Name: Accohanoc
- Namesake: Accohanoc
- Builder: Consolidated Shipbuilding Corp., Morris Heights, New York
- Laid down: 12 April 1945
- Launched: 9 July 1945
- In service: May 1947
- Out of service: February 1987
- Reclassified: District Harbor Tug, February 1962
- Stricken: February 1987
- Homeport: Naval Station Mayport
- Identification: Hull symbol: YTB-545; Hull symbol: YTM-545
- Fate: Transferred to Maritime Administration (MARAD), 10 June 1987
- Name: Accohanoc
- Owner: MARAD
- Acquired: 10 June 1987
- Homeport: James River Reserve Fleet
- Identification: Hull symbol: TD-25
- Fate: Swamped, 16 September 1999

General characteristics
- Class & type: Hisada-class harbor tug
- Displacement: 260 long tons (264 t); 310 long tons (315 t) (Full load)
- Length: 100 ft (30 m)
- Beam: 25 ft (7.6 m)
- Draft: 9 ft 7 in (2.92 m)
- Propulsion: 1 × Diesel engine; 1 × Screw
- Speed: 12 kn (22 km/h; 14 mph)
- Complement: 10

USS Accohanoc (YTB/YTM-545/TD-25) was a Hisada-class harbor tug in the service of the United States Navy, named after a tribe of the Powhatan confederacy.

== Construction ==
Accohanoc was laid down on 12 April 1945, at Morris Heights, New York, by Consolidated Shipbuilding Corp.; launched on 9 July 1945; and delivered to the Navy on 28 December 1945.

== Service history ==
By that time, however, World War II had ended and the Navy's need for all types of ships had greatly diminished. Consequently, instead of joining the Fleet, the large harbor tug was placed in reserve at Green Cove Springs, Florida, and remained inactive for 16 months.

She was finally placed in service in May 1947, for duty in the 7th Naval District, plying the waters of Florida. When the 7th Naval District was dissolved on 1 September 1948, Accohanoc reported to the commandant of its successor, the enlarged 6th Naval District. That assignment endured for almost 40 years. In February 1962, the tug was reclassified a medium harbor tug and redesignated YTM-545. Her last years as a naval vessel were spent handling the Lexington (CVT-16) in and out of berth at Pensacola Naval Air Station, Pensacola, Florida.

In February 1987, Accohanoc was placed out of service and her name was struck from the Navy List. She was transferred to the Maritime Administration (MARAD) on 10 June 1987.

Accohanoc was used in the James River Reserve Fleet, redesignated TD-25, until she was swamped 16 September 1999, by Hurricane Floyd. Her final disposition is unknown, but possibly scrapped.

== Bibliography ==
- "Accohanoc (YTB-545)". Dictionary of American Naval Fighting Ships. Navy Department, Naval History and Heritage Command. 9 July 2015.
- "Accohanoc (YTM-545)". NavSource. 20 December 2019.
