= Wisconsin Valley Improvement Company =

Wisconsin company

The Wisconsin Valley Improvement Company is a private company chartered by Section 182.70 of the Wisconsin Statutes. The company is responsible for organizing the flow from most of the upper Wisconsin River tributaries, and this flow affects the economy and ecosystem of the entire river. Its member companies are the owners and operators of dams along the Wisconsin River, such as paper manufacturers and utility companies with hydroelectric facilities on that river. The company is located in Wausau, Wisconsin. They include:

- NewPage
- Domtar
- Packaging Corporation of America
- Wisconsin River Power Company
- Alliant Energy
- Wausau Paper
- Expera Specialty Solutions
- Wisconsin Public Service Corporation

According to its charter, the company is to maintain

nearly a uniform flow of water as practicable in the Wisconsin and Tomahawk rivers by storing in reservoirs surplus water for discharge when the water supply is low to improve the usefulness of the rivers for all public purposes and to reduce flood damage.

The reservoirs it operates

shall be located north of township 37 north in or along the Wisconsin River, and in or along any tributary of the Wisconsin River that discharges into the river at any point north of the south line of township 23 north.

The company was founded by an act of the Wisconsin State Legislature in 1907, as an outgrowth of several previous attempts to organize cooperative use of the water resources in the upper Wisconsin River basin. The company owns and maintains 21 reservoirs on the Wisconsin River and its tributaries. Sixteen of these reservoirs are natural lake reservoirs, and five are artificial reservoirs. Of the five artificial reservoirs, one is on the Wisconsin River: Rainbow Flowage. The other four are on the Willow River, Tomahawk River, Spirit River, and Big Eau Pleine River, all of which are western tributaries of the Wisconsin.

== See also ==
- Goc, Michael J (1993). Stewards of the Wisconsin: Wisconsin Valley Improvement Company. New Past Press. ISBN 0938627198.
