= Wilson, Lincoln County, Wisconsin =

Wilson, Wisconsin
- Town
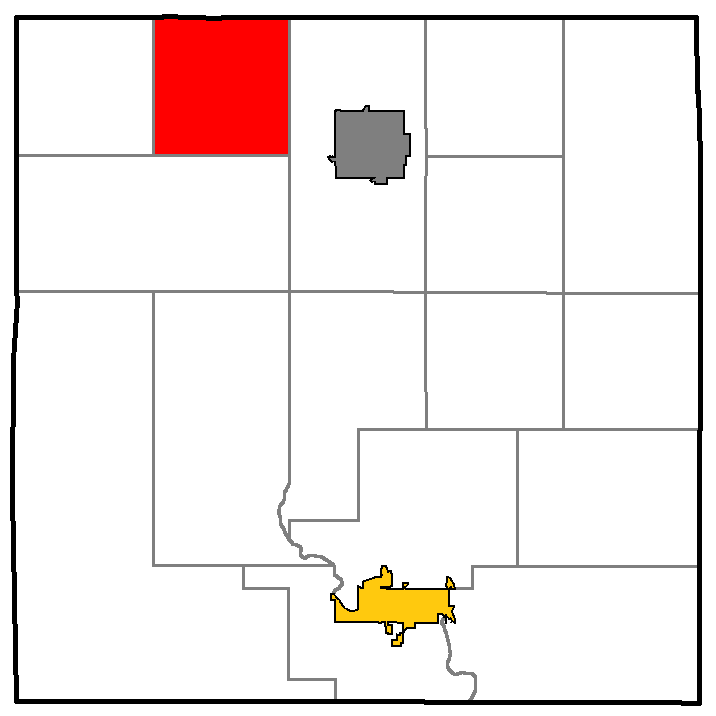
- Location of Wilson, within Lincoln County

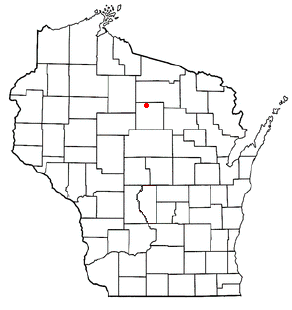
- Location of Wilson, Wisconsin
- Coordinates: 45°30′36″N 89°51′2″W
- Country: United States
- State: Wisconsin
- County: Lincoln

Area
  - Total: 36.32 sq mi (94.07 km^{2})
  - Land: 35.02 sq mi (90.70 km^{2})
  - Water: 1.30 sq mi (3.36 km^{2})
- Elevation: 1,457 ft (444 m)

Population (2020)
  - Total: 317
  - Density: 9.05/sq mi (3.50/km^{2})
- Time zone: UTC-6 (Central (CST))
  - Summer (DST): UTC-5 (CDT)
- ZIP Codes: 54487 (Tomahawk); 54564 (Tripoli)
- Area codes: 715 & 534
- FIPS code: 55-069-87425
- GNIS feature ID: 1584445
- Website: wilson-lincoln-wi.gov

Wilson is a town in Lincoln County, Wisconsin, United States. The population was 317 at the 2020 census. The unincorporated community of McCord is located partially in the town.

== Geography ==
Wilson is in northern Lincoln County, 9 miles (14 km) northwest of the city of Tomahawk. The town is bordered to the north by Oneida County. U.S. Route 8 crosses the northern part of the town, leading east 8 miles (13 km) to U.S. Route 51 and west 22 miles (35 km) to Prentice.

According to the United States Census Bureau, the town has a total area of 36.3 square miles (94.1 km^{2}), of which 35.0 square miles (90.7 km^{2}) are land and 1.3 square miles (3.4 km^{2}), or 3.58%, are water. The town is drained by the Somo River and its tributaries, leading east to the Wisconsin River at Lake Mohawksin in Tomahawk. Somo Lake is in the middle of the town, on the Little Somo River.

== Demographics ==
As of the census of 2000, there were 299 people, 130 households, and 92 families residing in the town. The population density was 8.5 people per square mile (3.3/km^{2}). There were 334 housing units at an average density of 9.5 per square mile (3.7/km^{2}). The racial makeup of the town was 98.66% White, 0.33% Asian, and 1% from two or more races.

There were 130 households, out of which 21.5% had children under the age of 18 living with them, 64.6% were married couples living together, 3.1% had a female householder with no husband present, and 29.2% were non-families. 22.3% of all households were made up of individuals, and 13.1% had someone living alone who was 65 years of age or older. The average household size was 2.3 and the average family size was 2.64.

In the town, the population was spread out, with 18.1% under the age of 18, 5% from 18 to 24, 22.7% from 25 to 44, 32.8% from 45 to 64, and 21.4% who were 65 years of age or older. The median age was 48 years. For every 100 females, there were 95.4 males. For every 100 females age 18 and over, there were 100.8 males.

The median income for a household in the town was $32,750, and the median income for a family was $38,125. Males had a median income of $32,321 versus $20,625 for females. The per capita income for the town was $16,103. About 11% of families and 13.1% of the population were below the poverty line, including 18.9% of those under the age of eighteen and 12.5% of those 65 or over.
