= Tomahawk (YTB-789) =

Tugboat of the United States Navy

History

United States
- Name: Tomahawk
- Builder: Marinette Marine, Marinette, Wisconsin
- Laid down: 31 January 1966
- Launched: 5 May 1966
- Acquired: 7 June 1966
- In service: 8 July 1966
- Stricken: 1 October 2004
- Fate: Sold 22 January 2008

General characteristics
- Class & type: Natick-class large harbor tug
- Displacement: 283 long tons (288 t) (light); 356 long tons (362 t) (full)
- Length: 109 ft (33 m)
- Beam: 31 ft (9.4 m)
- Draft: 14 ft (4.3 m)
- Speed: 12 knots (22 km/h; 14 mph)
- Complement: 12

Tomahawk (YTB-789) was a United States Navy Natick-class large harbor tug named for the Tomahawk River in Wisconsin.

== Construction and career ==
The contract for Tomahawk was awarded 14 January 1965. She was laid down on 31 January 1966 at Marinette, Wisconsin, by Marinette Marine and launched on 5 May 1966. Her fitting-out period ended on 8 July 1966, and the large harbor tug reported to the 10th Naval District, San Juan, Puerto Rico, and provided tug and tow services out of Roosevelt Roads until reassigned to the 6th Naval District in the spring of 1971 and stationed at Mayport, Florida.

Stricken from the Navy Directory 1 October 2004, Tomahawk was disposed of by the Defense Reutilization and Marketing Service (DRMS) by Exchange/Sale for reuse/conversion on 22 January 2008.
