= Mary Felzkowski =

American politician (born 1963)

President of the Wisconsin Senate
- Incumbent
- Assumed office January 6, 2025
- Preceded by: Chris Kapenga

Member of the Wisconsin Senate from the 12th district
- Incumbent
- Assumed office January 4, 2021
- Preceded by: Tom Tiffany

Member of the Wisconsin State Assembly from the 35th district
- In office January 7, 2013 – January 4, 2021
- Preceded by: Tom Tiffany
- Succeeded by: Calvin Callahan

Personal details
- Born: Mary Jean Behling; September 25, 1963 (age 62) Tomahawk, Wisconsin, U.S.
- Party: Republican
- Spouses: Bruce Czaja (div. 2011); Jeff Felzkowski (m. 2016)
- Children: 5
- Education: University of Wisconsin, River Falls (BS)
- Website: State Senate website

Mary Jean Felzkowski (née Behling; born September 25, 1963) is an American businesswoman and Republican politician from northern Wisconsin. She is the current president of the Wisconsin Senate, since 2025, and has served in the Senate since 2021. She represents Wisconsin's 12th Senate district, which comprises a large swath of northern Wisconsin. She previously served eight years in the Wisconsin State Assembly, and was assistant majority leader in the 2019–2020 session.

She was known as Mary Czaja until her second marriage in 2016. On many official documents after 2017, including the 2018 and 2020 election ballots, her name appeared as Mary Czaja-Felzkowski.

== Early life and education ==
Mary Felzkowski was born Mary Jean Behling on September 25, 1963. She graduated from Tomahawk High School before earning a Bachelor of Science in Finance and Economics from the University of Wisconsin–River Falls.

== Career ==
Felzkowski is the owner of CIS Insurance Group in Tomahawk, Wisconsin. In November 2012, she was elected to the Wisconsin State Assembly as a Republican, succeeding Tom Tiffany, who was elected to the Wisconsin State Senate.

Felzkowski is a supporter of medical cannabis, and submitted a measure to legalize it in Wisconsin. Felzkowski has also advocated against the expansion of Medicaid. She was chosen by the Republican caucus as the assistant majority leader in the 2019–2020 session.

After incumbent state senator Tom Tiffany was elected to Congress in a 2020 special election, Felzkowski announced that she would run for the seat he was vacating in the Wisconsin Senate. She was unopposed in the Republican primary, and went on to defeat Democrat Ed Vocke in the 2020 general election.

On August 23, 2024, while serving as co-chair of the state's Special Committee on State-Tribal Relations, Felzkowki made controversial statements equating Wisconsin's Lac du Flambeau Band of Lake Superior Chippewa to "terrorists" when commenting on a territorial dispute between the tribe and the neighboring township. The Lac du Flambeau Band retaliated by issuing a proclamation banishing Felzkowski from their reservation.

Following the 2024 Wisconsin Senate elections, Felzkowski was elected to be the Senate president going into the 107th Wisconsin Legislature.

Following the negotiations for the 2025-2027 state budget, which had been done on a bipartisan basis between Democratic governor Tony Evers, and state legislative leaders of both parties in the state senate, Felzkowski voted against the budget. Additionally, Felzkowski was the only state senate president in state history to vote against a biennial budget.

== Personal life ==
Felzkowski has been married twice and has five children. She took the name Mary Czaja after marrying her first husband Bruce Czaja; they divorced in 2011. She subsequently married Jeffery James Felzkowski on December 31, 2016, and took the name Mary Felzkowski.

She is a former president of Tomahawk Main Street, Inc., a community organization of Tomahawk businesses, and a former board member and national director of the National Association of Professional Insurance Agents. She is a lifetime member of the National Rifle Association of America.

== Electoral history ==
=== Wisconsin Assembly (2012–2018) ===
Year	Election	Date	Elected				Defeated				Total	Plurality
2012	General	Nov. 6	Mary Czaja	Republican	15,481	53.30%	Kevin Koth	Dem.	12,149	41.83%	29,045	3,332
2012	General	Nov. 6	Mary Czaja	Republican	15,481	53.30%	Patrick K. Tjugum	Ind.	1,397	4.81%	29,045	3,332
2014	General	Nov. 4	Mary Czaja (inc)	Republican	18,713	98.58%	--unopposed--				18,982	18,444
2016	General	Nov. 8	Mary Czaja (inc)	Republican	18,622	66.02%	Renea Frederick	Dem.	9,564	33.91%	28,208	9,058
2018	General	Nov. 6	Mary Czaja-Felzkowski (inc)	Republican	16,380	62.74%	Mark A. Martello	Dem.	9,714	37.21%	26,107	6,666

=== Wisconsin Senate (2020, 2024) ===
Year	Election	Date	Elected				Defeated				Total	Plurality
2020	General	Nov. 3	Mary Czaja-Felzkowski	Republican	67,800	65.66%	Ed Vocke	Dem.	35,386	34.27%	103,256	32,414
2024	General	Nov. 5	Mary Felzkowski (inc)	Republican	74,162	67.46%	Andi Rich	Dem.	35,628	32.41%	109,936	38,534

Political offices
Preceded by Chris Kapenga	President of the Wisconsin Senate; 2025–present	Incumbent
