= Dolhun Field Airport =

- IATA: none; ICAO: none; FAA LID: WI36

Summary
- Airport type: Private
- Owner: Dolhun Field Airpark Owners Assn. UA
- Location: Lake Tomahawk, Wisconsin
- Opened: October 1999
- Time zone: CST (UTC−06:00)
  - Summer (DST): CDT (UTC−05:00)
- Elevation AMSL: 1,625 ft (495 m)
- Coordinates: 45°49′36″N 089°37′13″W

Map
- Location of airport in Wisconsin WI36 (the United States)

Runways
Direction	Length		Surface
Direction	ft	m	Surface
18/36	2,700	823	Asphalt

Statistics
- Based aircraft (2024): 2
- Source: Federal Aviation Administration

Dolhun Field Airport (FAA LID: WI36) is a private airport founded by Theodore Dolhun in 1945 located 1.54 miles northwest of Lake Tomahawk, Wisconsin in Oneida County, just off of Highway 47.

== Facilities ==
The airport covers an area of 32 acres (13 ha) at an elevation of 1,625 feet (495 m) above mean sea level. It has one runway designated 18/36 with an asphalt surface measuring 2,700 by 75 feet (823 x 23 m).

In August 2024, there were 2 aircraft based at this airport: 2 single-engine.

== See also ==
- List of airports in Wisconsin
