= Somo River =

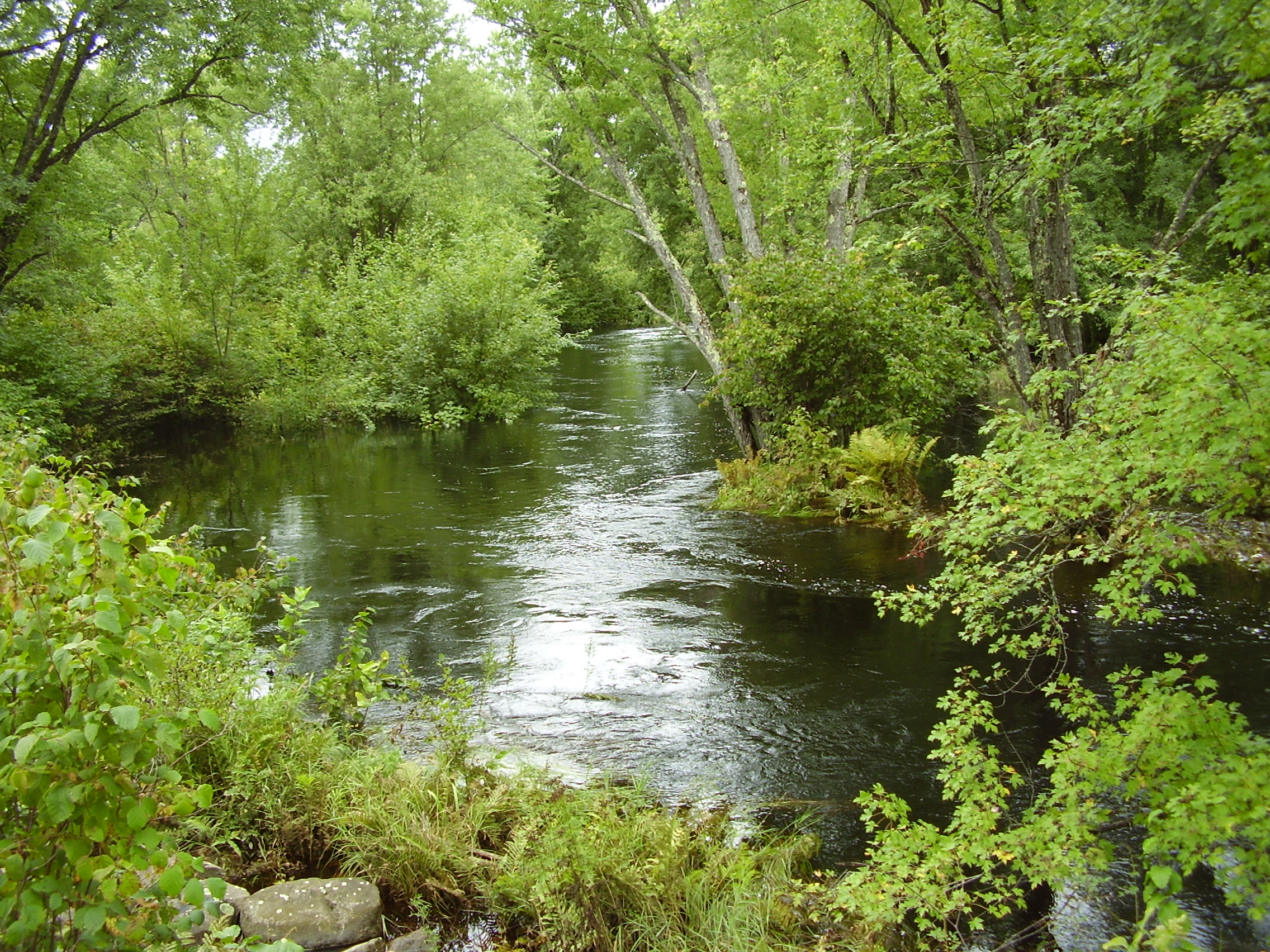
- Somo River from Zenith Fire Tower Road bridge.

Physical characteristics
- Source
  - coordinates: 45.55562°N 90.043949°W
- Mouth
  - coordinates: 45.476142°N 89.785523°W

Basin features
- Tributaries
  - left: Little Somo River

The Somo River (sometimes called the Big Somo) is a tributary of the Tomahawk River, with headwaters in Price County, but mostly lying in Lincoln County. The source is the confluence of Somo Creek and Little Somo Creek in the unincorporated community of Clifford. The river flows approximately east-southeast, and terminates in Lake Mohawksin. Prior to the existence of Lake Mohawksin, which floods the confluence, the Somo flowed into the Tomahawk, just a few hundred yards up stream of its confluence with the Wisconsin.

A primary tributary of the Somo is the Little Somo River, which joins the main river about five miles upstream from Lake Mohawksin. Somo Lake is on the Little Somo, not the Somo. The Little Somo, Somo Lake and the Somo River are traditionally combined in general reference as the "Somo region."

== See also ==
- List of rivers in Wisconsin
