= Tomahawk Lake (Wisconsin) =

Lake in Oneida County, Wisconsin, United States

- Location within Wisconsin Location within the United States
- Location: Oneida County, Wisconsin
- Coordinates: 45.826898°N 89.652644°W
- Primary outflows: Tomahawk River
- Basin countries: United States
- Surface area: 3,392 acres (1,373 ha)
- Max. depth: 84 ft (26 m)
- Water volume: 111,956 acre⋅ft (138,096,000 m^{3})
- Shore length^{1}: 30.2 mi (48.6 km)
- Surface elevation: 1,585 ft (483 m)
- Settlements: Lake Tomahawk, Wisconsin
- ^{1} Shore length is not a well-defined measure.

Tomahawk Lake is a lake in Oneida County, Wisconsin, United States. The lake covers an area of 3,392 acres (1,373 ha) and has a maximum depth of 84 feet (26 m). The community of Lake Tomahawk is located on the eastern edge of the lake. Tomahawk Lake was so named from the fact its outline resembles a tomahawk.

Tomahawk Lake is the source of the Tomahawk River. Historically, Tomahawk Lake was part of a travel route for traders and Indians who portaged to and from the Wisconsin River at the east end of the lake.
