= Willow Reservoir =

- Location within Wisconsin Location within the United States
- Location: Oneida County, Wisconsin
- Coordinates: 45.718611°N 89.881944°W
- Type: reservoir
- Primary inflows: Tomahawk River, Willow River and Swampsauger Creek
- Basin countries: United States
- Surface area: 6,306 acres (2,552 ha)
- Max. depth: 30 ft (9.1 m)
- Water volume: 64,644 acre⋅ft (79,737,000 m^{3})
- Shore length^{1}: 79.2 mi (127.5 km)
- Surface elevation: 1,522 ft (464 m)
- ^{1} Shore length is not a well-defined measure.

The Willow Reservoir or Willow Flowage is an artificial lake in Oneida County, Wisconsin formed by a dam on the Tomahawk River. The dam and reservoir level are controlled by the Wisconsin Valley Improvement Company as part of regulating the overall flow of the upper Wisconsin River. When full, Willow Reservoir has a surface area of 6306 acres.

Other major inflows to the Willow Reservoir are the Willow River and Swampsauger Creek.
