= McCord, Wisconsin =

- Unincorporated community
- Location within Wisconsin Location within the United States
- Coordinates: 45°33′19″N 89°53′59″W
- Country: United States
- State: Wisconsin
- Counties: Lincoln, Oneida
- Towns: Wilson, Little Rice
- Elevation: 1,470 ft (450 m)
- Time zone: UTC-6 (Central (CST))
  - Summer (DST): UTC-5 (CDT)
- Area codes: 715 & 534
- GNIS feature ID: 1577717

McCord is an unincorporated community in Lincoln and Oneida counties in the U.S. state of Wisconsin. The Lincoln County portion of McCord is in the town of Wilson, while the Oneida County portion is in the town of Little Rice. McCord is on U.S. Route 8, 10 miles (16 km) west-northwest of Tomahawk. The community was named after Myron H. McCord, a territorial governor of Arizona and member of the Wisconsin State Senate and the U.S. House of Representatives.
