= SRT Tomahawk =

Fictional vehicle created by Chrysler

Overview
- Manufacturer: Street & Racing Technology (Dodge)
- Designer: Paul Hoste

Body and chassis
- Class: Fictional concept car
- Body style: Coupé
- Layout: Mid-engine, four-wheel-drive

Powertrain
- Engine: 6,980 cubic centimetres (426 cu in; 6.98 L) naturally-aspirated 144-degree DOHC V10
- Power output: All hypothetical: 693 hp (703 PS) at 9,200 rpm - Gr. 1; 1,007 hp (1,021 PS) at 9,200 rpm - S 1,449 hp (1,469 PS) at 9,200 rpm - GTS-R; 2,586 hp (2,622 PS) at 13,800 rpm - X
- Transmission: 7-speed dual-clutch
- Hybrid drivetrain: Direct drive pneumatic system (front); Electronically controlled limited-slip differential (rear)

Dimensions
- Wheelbase: 2,988 mm (117.6 in)
- Length: 5,040 mm (198 in)
- Curb weight: Hypothetical: 950 kg (2,094 lb) - Gr. 1; 921 kg (2,030 lb) - S 663 kg (1,462 lb) - GTS-R; 749 kg (1,651 lb) - X

The Dodge SRT Tomahawk Vision Gran Turismo is a fictional concept car created by Street & Racing Technology, a sub-division of Stellantis North America (formerly Fiat Chrysler Automobiles). It was developed as part of the Vision Gran Turismo project, where real-life automakers partner with video game developer Polyphony Digital to create car models for their Gran Turismo driving simulation series. The vehicle was released as downloadable content for Gran Turismo 6 in 2015. While the car's advanced design makes it impossible to functionally create with 2015 technology, the company has discussed creating it a few decades in the future, when technology has caught up with the car's design.

In Gran Turismo Sport and Gran Turismo 7, all of the Tomahawks are sold under the Dodge name to acknowledge the fact that SRT was absorbed back into Stellantis North America's Dodge brand.

== History and development ==
The SRT Tomahawk was teased in late May 2015, and fully revealed a week later in June 2015. A concept car developed by Stellantis, the vehicle was created digitally for the video game Gran Turismo 6. A small-scale physical model of the vehicle's "S" model was created. The vehicle was designed more as a conceptual "preview of what supercars could look like in 20 years", with the vehicle's makeup deemed impossible with 2015 technology (but it was estimated that technology could advance to the point of plausibility closer to the year 2035). The car's design was so exaggerated compared to current automobiles that even the Gran Turismo 6 physics engine needed to be reworked to allow the car to function in the in-game world.

Three models of the vehicle were created: the Tomahawk S, the Tomahawk GTS-R, and the Tomahawk X (the original version). The three variants were created because the game designers felt that even in the game the car was too overpowered and difficult to control, leading the team to create the two weaker, more accessible variants. Additionally, it was purported that were the car ever developed in real life, a G-suit would be necessary to withstand acceleration forces (unless using the comparatively lower-powered S variant).

The Tomahawk S was featured in June 2016 as a scale model in Polyphony Digital's Gran Turismo Sport unveiling event in the Copper Box Arena along with nine other full-size and scaled replicas of Vision GT vehicles.

== Design ==
The Tomahawk is powered by a 6980 cc naturally aspirated 144-degree DOHC V10 engine, capable of producing up to 2,164 horsepower (1,614 kW; 2,194 PS). This output varies between the three models in the Tomahawk series. There is a regenerative pneumatic hybrid system with a high storage capacity that stores compressed air in composite tanks, and when used, the compressed air becomes a drive force. As with the engine, the pneumatic power output differs between the three models. The engine delivers power to the rear wheels via a 7-speed paddle-shifted dual-clutch transmission, and the pneumatic hybrid system delivers power to the front wheels using a direct drive mechanism. Together, the two systems make the car all-wheel-drive.

All three models are equipped with a 100-litre fuel tank and carbon matrix disc brakes. Five exhaust pipes deliver a large amount of exhaust gases out of the car in a blown diffuser configuration. The body is shaped with a continuous flow to decrease the coefficient of drag. It also uses a graphene lattice, a form of carbon purported to be stronger than steel and lighter than carbon fibre. The chassis includes a structural spine that extends throughout the car, most likely to steady the chassis in high speed. The light clusters, both front and rear, consist of plasma lights.

=== Tomahawk S ===
SRT Tomahawk S

The Tomahawk S (labeled the Tomahawk Street in Brand Central of Gran Turismo Sport) is the entry-level variant that has all the capabilities of the concept itself in a street-legal form. The "S" in the name means "Street". The 7.0L V10 is set to 791 horsepower (590 kW; 802 PS) and 501 pound-feet (679 N⋅m) of torque. Along with the pneumatic system, which in this case produces another 215 horsepower (160 kW; 218 PS), the total amount is set at 1,007 horsepower (751 kW; 1,021 PS). Since the vehicle is meant to be street-legal, the weight is set at 921 kilograms (2,030 lb), low enough to give the car a total power-to-weight ratio of 1,092 horsepower per ton. All of the power is sent to the rear wheels, and the pneumatic system drives the front wheels, therefore making it an all-wheel-drive car. The vehicle is also equipped with active aerodynamics located at the front splitter and an integrated rear spoiler.

=== Tomahawk GTS-R ===
==== Vision Gran Turismo ====
SRT Tomahawk GTS-R

The Tomahawk GTS-R (labelled the Tomahawk Racing in Brand Central of Gran Turismo Sport) is a concept racing version based on the S variant, built to withstand extreme g-forces when cornering and produce very quick lap times. The V10 engine is now set at 1,136 horsepower (847 kW; 1,152 PS) and 719 pound-feet (975 N⋅m) of torque, which, along with the pneumatic system (now set at 313 horsepower), results in a total of 1,449 horsepower (1,081 kW; 1,469 PS). Weight has also been drastically reduced to 663 kg (1,462 lb), which means the power-to-weight ratio is now 2,185 horsepower per ton. As mentioned before, the vehicle is built to withstand extreme g-forces, which means downforce has been extensively upgraded for racing. The integrated spoiler now lifts, and a second element extends from underneath the spoiler as an airbrake. Other than that, the rest of the design stays the same.

==== Group 1 ====
SRT Tomahawk Group 1

The Tomahawk Group 1 (labelled the Tomahawk Gr. 1 in Brand Central of Gran Turismo Sport) is the prototype racing version of the Tomahawk, and also the alternate to the GTS-R, built to compete along with other LMP1 prototypes. "Group 1" is the second-highest racing level of the Gran Turismo Sport game, and is the class belonging to sports prototypes and high-end Vision Gran Turismo race cars, and is the reason why this Tomahawk uses the name. The V10 engine is reduced to 693 horsepower (517 kW; 703 PS). The weight is the heaviest out of all Tomahawk models, at 950 kg (2,094 lb), therefore setting the power-to-weight ratio to 729 horsepower per ton (despite the lack of a pneumatic drive system).

The Group 1 Tomahawk's aerodynamic body kit is reminiscent of modern Le Mans prototypes, with a multi-element fixed wing, dive planes, and a vertical stabilizer, although the GTS-R's body shape has been carried over. The Group 1 is also the only rear-wheel-drive car of the series, to meet modern prototype regulations.

=== Tomahawk X ===
SRT Tomahawk X

The Tomahawk X (labelled the Tomahawk Technology in Brand Central of Gran Turismo Sport) is the extreme version of the Tomahawk, built solely to push boundaries and cross thresholds. The "X" in the name means "Experimental". The V10 engine is set at 2,168 horsepower (1,617 kW; 2,198 PS) and 898 pound-feet (1,218 N⋅m) of torque. Combined with the pneumatic system, set at 422 horsepower, the X's total output is 2,586 horsepower (1,928 kW; 2,622 PS). The weight has increased from the GTS-R at 749 kg (1,651 lb), mostly due to the fact the car has extra aerodynamic parts. With all of these specifications, this gives for an extreme power-to-weight ratio of 3,452 horsepower per ton. In game the car has a top speed of over 400 mph and is able to lap the Nürburgring Nordschleife in around 3 minutes average.

As mentioned before, the vehicle's body now has nine control surfaces, including four panels located above the wheels, two "rudder" panels aft of the rear wheels, and the dual-element rear wing as seen in the GTS-R.

=== Table of specifications ===
| Model | Displacement | Horsepower | HP RPM | Torque | Torque RPM | Weight | Length | Width | Height | Wheelbase | 0-60 | Top Speed |
|---|---|---|---|---|---|---|---|---|---|---|---|---|
| S/Street | 6,980 cubic centimetres (426 cu in; 6.98 L) naturally-aspirated V10 | 1,007 hp (751 kW; 1,021 PS) | 9,200 | 501.0 lb⋅ft (679.3 N⋅m) | 7,400 | 921 kg (2,030 lb) | 5,040 mm (198 in) | 2,250 mm (89 in) | 950 mm (37 in) | 2,988 mm (117.6 in) | 2.5s | 300 mph (480 km/h) |
| GTS-R/Racing | 6,980 cubic centimetres (426 cu in; 6.98 L) naturally-aspirated V10 | 1,449 hp (1,081 kW; 1,469 PS) | 9,200 | 719.4 lb⋅ft (975.4 N⋅m) | 7,400 | 663 kg (1,462 lb) | 5,040 mm (198 in) | 2,250 mm (89 in) | 950 mm (37 in) | 2,988 mm (117.6 in) | 2.5s | 355 mph (571 km/h) |
| X/Technology | 6,980 cubic centimetres (426 cu in; 6.98 L) naturally-aspirated V10 | 2,586 hp (1,928 kW; 2,622 PS) | 14,500 | 898.0 lb⋅ft (1,217.5 N⋅m) | 9,500 | 749 kg (1,651 lb) | 5,039 mm (198.4 in) | 2,250 mm (89 in) | 940 mm (37 in) | 2,988 mm (117.6 in) | 1.74s | 391.5–404 mph (630.1–650.2 km/h) |
| Group 1 | 6,980 cubic centimetres (426 cu in; 6.98 L) naturally-aspirated V10 | 693 hp (517 kW; 703 PS) | 9,200 | 439.0 lb⋅ft (595.2 N⋅m) | 7,400 | 950 kg (2,094 lb) | 5,141 mm (202.4 in) | 2,244 mm (88.3 in) | 974 mm (38.3 in) | 2,988 mm (117.6 in) | 2.5s | 286 mph (460 km/h) |

== Reception ==
In Top Gear's overview of the car, editor Vijay Pattni stated that the prospect of such a car was a "lofty claim" of what technology would ever be like in 20 years, and that its impracticality would "test the limits of human physiology". Similarly, Chris Perkins of Mashable felt that such a vehicle was unlikely to ever materialize but still found the hypothetical idea enjoyable to explore. AutoWeek concurred that one would have to "suspend their disbelief" when reviewing the car's parameters, noting that such a car would require "an infinite budget" and that "It's more fun to pretend that the SRT Tomahawk is real. Or that it could be real." They also noted that the car did not perform particularly well in Gran Turismo 6's virtual world either, with its specs making it difficult to handle.
