= Willow River (Tomahawk River tributary) =

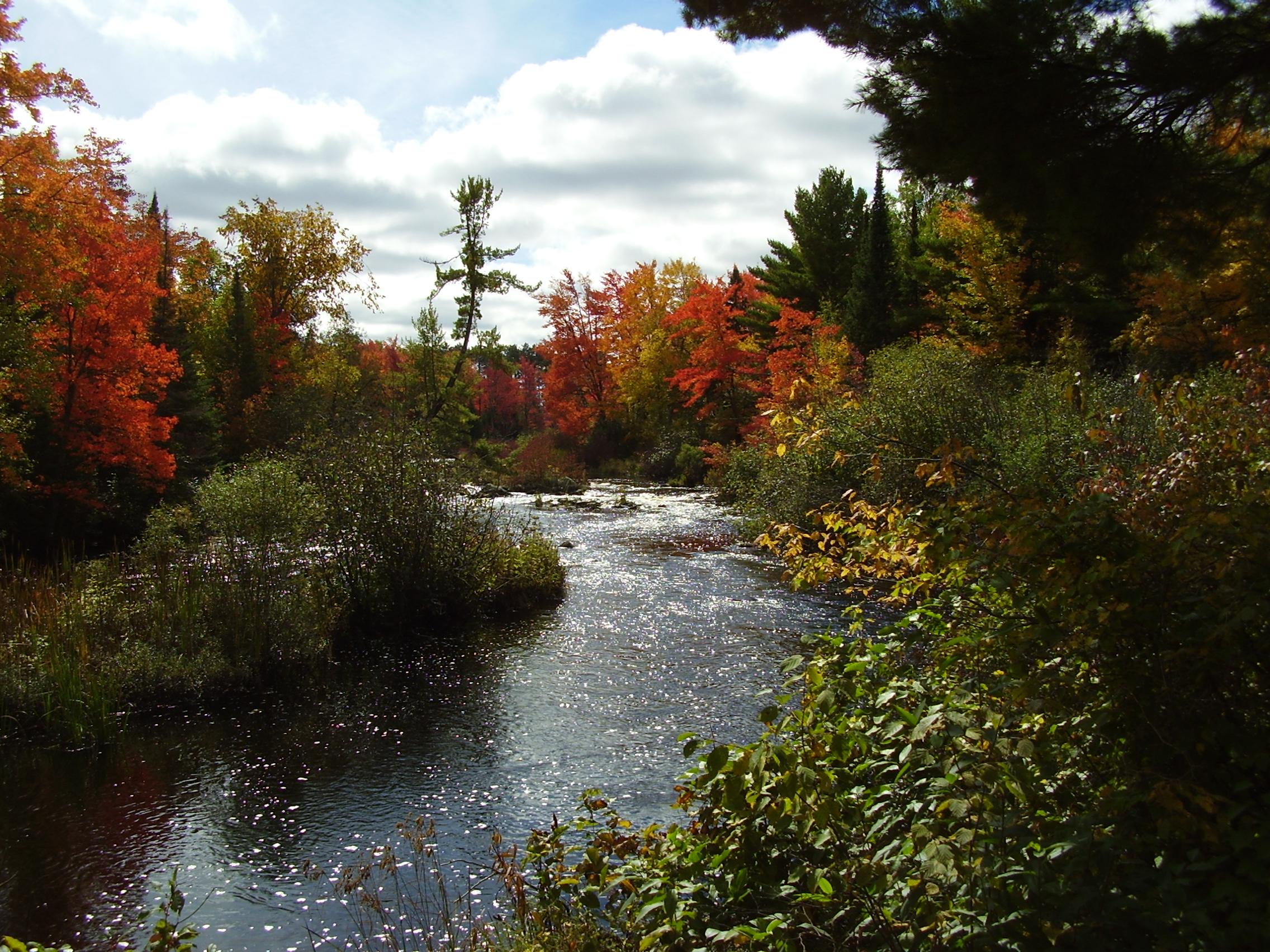
- Willow River near the rapids.

Physical characteristics
- Source
  - coordinates: 45.809121°N 89.067376°W
- Mouth
  - coordinates: 45.7016236°N 89.941260°W
  - elevation: 1,526 feet (465 m)

The Willow River is a river in Oneida County, Wisconsin, that merges with the Tomahawk River by way of the Willow Flowage. Historically the Willow River was a significant white pine logging region.
