= Little Rice, Wisconsin =

- Town
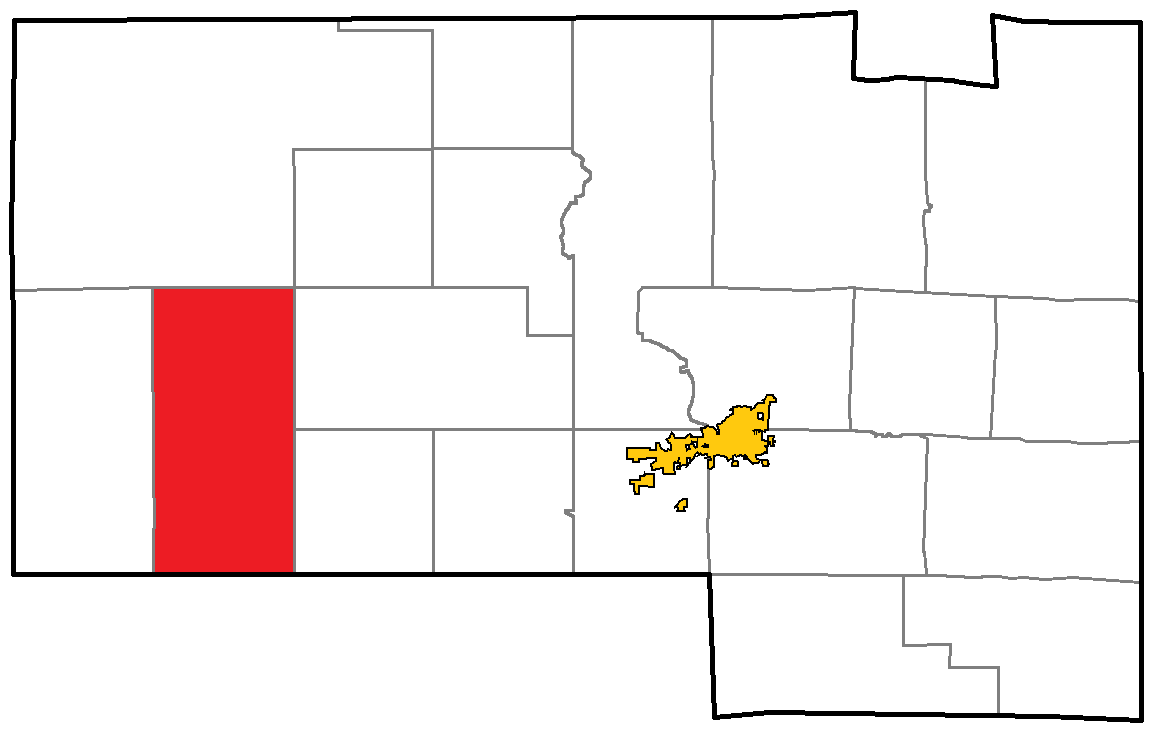
- Location of Little Rice, within Oneida County
- Coordinates: 45°38′12″N 89°50′37″W
- Country: United States
- State: Wisconsin
- County: Oneida

Area
  - Total: 73.7 sq mi (190.8 km^{2})
  - Land: 68.1 sq mi (176.4 km^{2})
  - Water: 5.6 sq mi (14.4 km^{2})
- Elevation: 1,535 ft (468 m)

Population (2020)
  - Total: 388
  - Density: 5.70/sq mi (2.20/km^{2})
- Time zone: UTC-6 (Central (CST))
  - Summer (DST): UTC-5 (CDT)
- Area codes: 715 & 534
- FIPS code: 55-45150
- GNIS feature ID: 1583584
- Website: https://townoflittlerice.com/

Little Rice is a town in Oneida County, Wisconsin, United States. The population was 388 at the 2020 census. The unincorporated community of McCord is located in the town.

== Geography ==
According to the United States Census Bureau, the town has a total area of 73.7 square miles (190.8 km^{2}), of which 68.1 square miles (176.4 km^{2}) is land and 5.6 square miles (14.4 km^{2}) (7.55%) is water.

== Demographics ==
As of the census of 2000, there were 314 people, 138 households, and 93 families residing in the town. The population density was 4.6 people per square mile (1.8/km^{2}). There were 435 housing units at an average density of 6.4 per square mile (2.5/km^{2}). The racial makeup of the town was 99.68% White, and 0.32% from two or more races.

There were 138 households, out of which 25.4% had children under the age of 18 living with them, 60.1% were married couples living together, 5.1% had a female householder with no husband present, and 31.9% were non-families. 26.1% of all households were made up of individuals, and 10.1% had someone living alone who was 65 years of age or older. The average household size was 2.28 and the average family size was 2.72.

In the town, the population was spread out, with 18.5% under the age of 18, 6.4% from 18 to 24, 27.1% from 25 to 44, 30.6% from 45 to 64, and 17.5% who were 65 years of age or older. The median age was 44 years. For every 100 females, there were 118.1 males. For every 100 females age 18 and over, there were 120.7 males.

The median income for a household in the town was $40,750, and the median income for a family was $44,531. Males had a median income of $30,893 versus $24,375 for females. The per capita income for the town was $21,659. About 2.3% of families and 4.0% of the population were below the poverty line, including none of those under age 18 and 4.8% of those age 65 or over.

== Transportation ==
The Rhinelander-Oneida County Airport (KRHI) serves Little Rice, the county and surrounding communities with both scheduled commercial jet service and general aviation services.
