= Council Grounds State Park =

State park in Lincoln County, Wisconsin

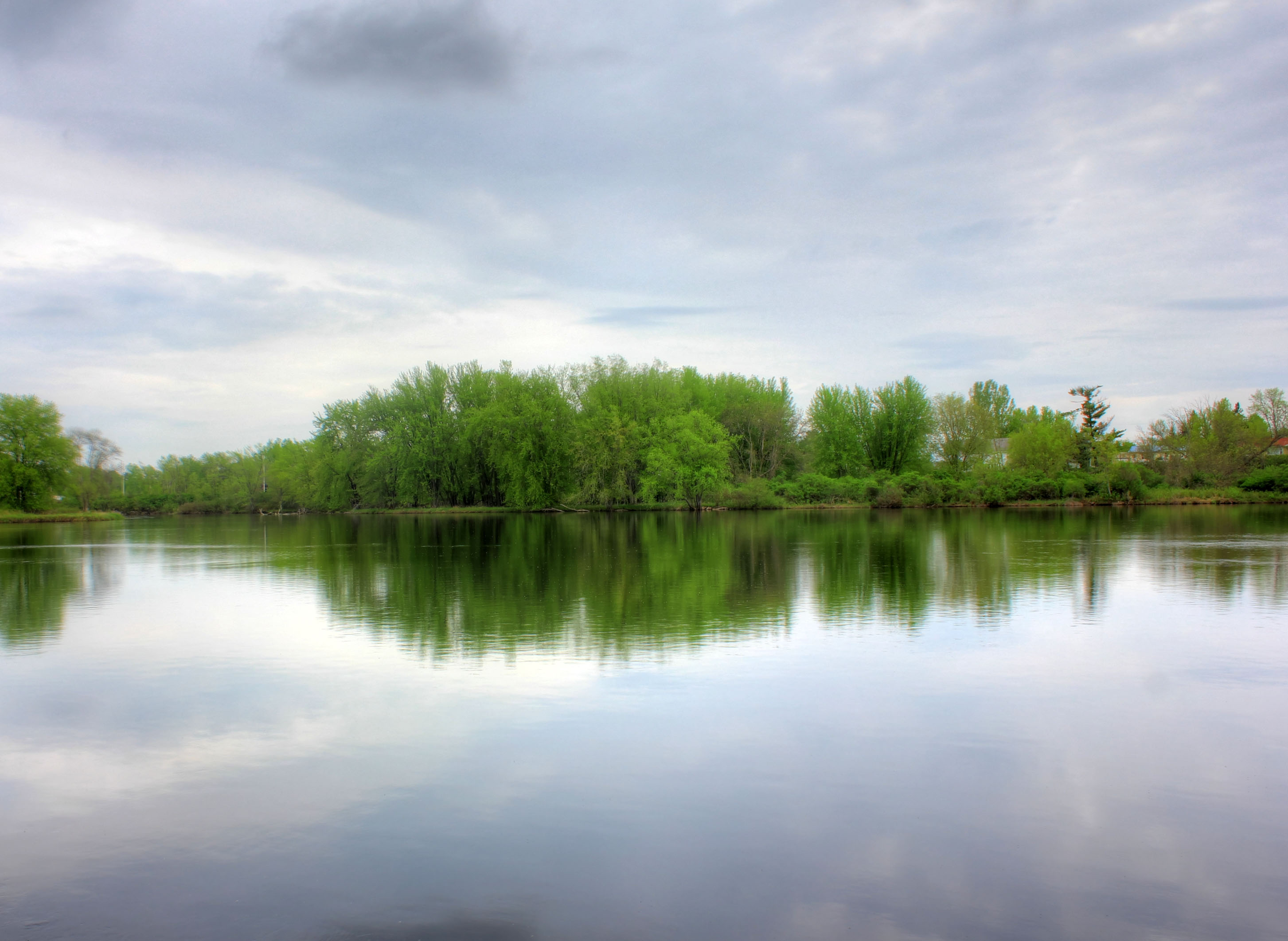

- Location within Wisconsin Location within the United States
- Interactive map of Council Grounds State Park
- Location: Lincoln County, Wisconsin, United States
- Coordinates: 45°11′7″N 89°44′35″W
- Area: 508 acres (206 ha)
- Elevation: 1,273 ft (388 m)
- Established: 1938
- Administrator: Wisconsin Department of Natural Resources
- Website: Official website
- Wisconsin State Parks

Council Grounds State Park is a 508-acre (206 ha) Wisconsin state park on the Wisconsin River in Lincoln County, Wisconsin, United States.

== History ==
The park was originally a Merrill city park that was donated to the state in 1938, evolving in designation from a state roadside park to a state forest to full state park status in 1978. The Works Progress Administration planted trees and built visitor amenities. The name Council Grounds comes from reports that the site was once used for seasonal gatherings of Native Americans.

== Gallery ==
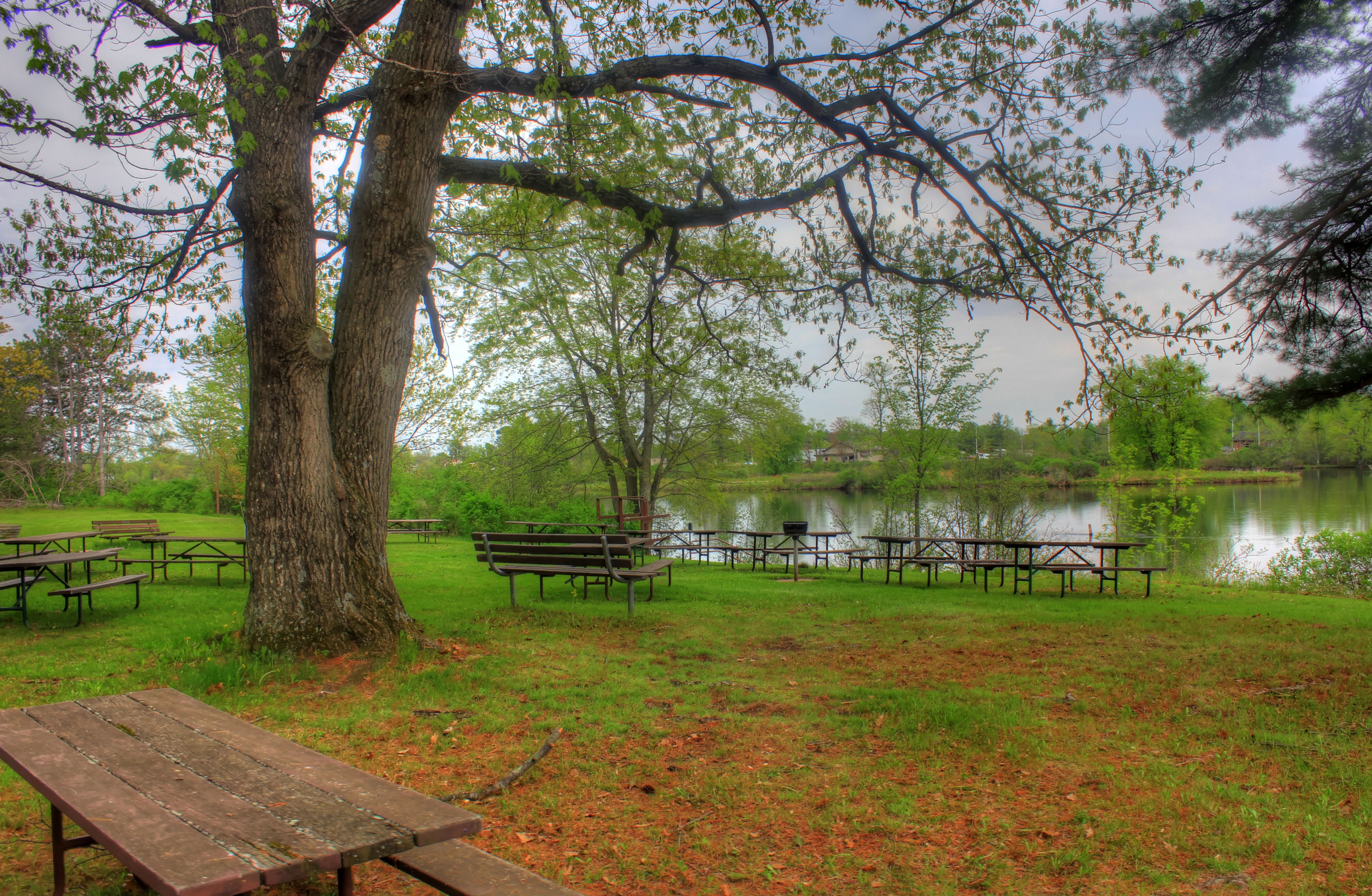
Picnic area by the lake

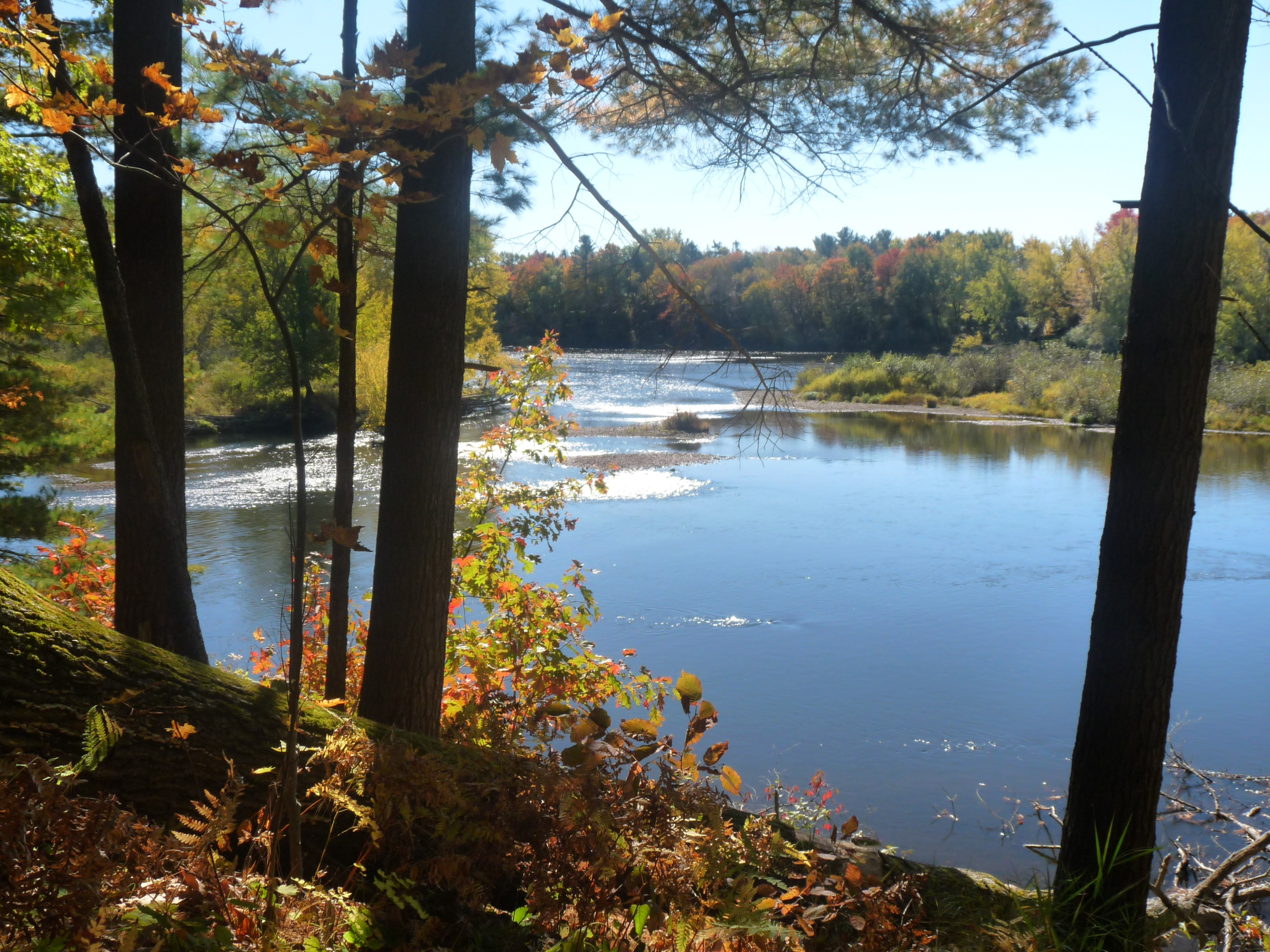
View of the river below the Alexander dam
