= Lake Tomahawk (CDP), Wisconsin =

Census-designated place in Wisconsin, United States

Lake Tomahawk, Wisconsin
- Census-designated place
- Location within Wisconsin
- Coordinates: 45°48′51″N 89°35′38″W
- Country: United States
- State: Wisconsin
- County: Oneida

Area
  - Total: 1.649 sq mi (4.27 km^{2})
  - Land: 1.537 sq mi (3.98 km^{2})
  - Water: 0.112 sq mi (0.29 km^{2})
- Elevation: 1,640 ft (500 m)

Population (2020)
  - Total: 246
  - Density: 160/sq mi (61.8/km^{2})
- Time zone: UTC-6 (Central (CST))
  - Summer (DST): UTC-5 (CDT)
- ZIP code: 54539
- Area codes: 715 & 534
- GNIS feature ID: 1567755

Lake Tomahawk is an unincorporated census-designated place located in the town of Lake Tomahawk, Oneida County, Wisconsin, United States. Lake Tomahawk is located on Wisconsin Highway 47, 15 miles (24 km) northwest of Rhinelander. Lake Tomahawk has a post office with ZIP code 54539. As of the 2020 census, its population was 246, up from 228 at the 2010 census.

== History ==
Lake Tomahawk was originally called Tomahawk Lake, and under the latter name was platted in 1892. The community took its name from nearby Tomahawk Lake. The name of the post office was changed from Tomahawk Lake to Lake Tomahawk in 1928.
