= Lake Tomahawk, Wisconsin =

- Town
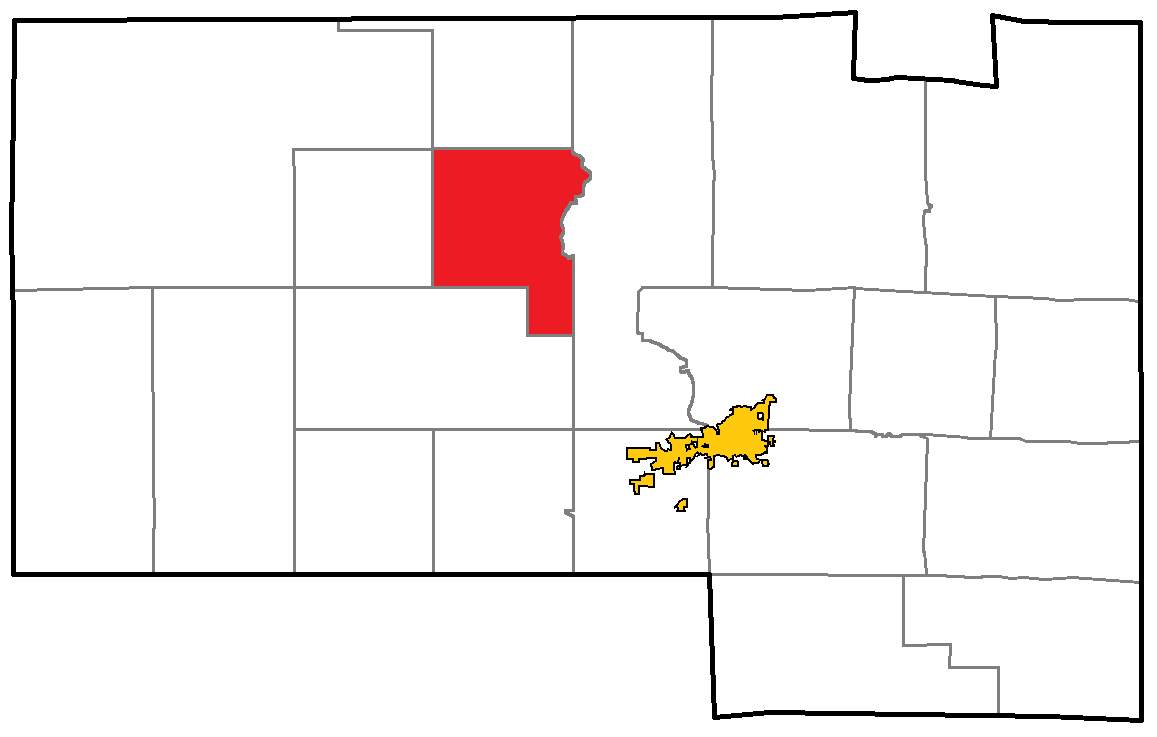
- Location of Lake Tomahawk, within Oneida County
- Coordinates: 45°46′51″N 89°36′32″W
- Country: United States
- State: Wisconsin
- County: Oneida

Area
  - Total: 39.2 sq mi (101.6 km^{2})
  - Land: 34.3 sq mi (88.9 km^{2})
  - Water: 4.9 sq mi (12.7 km^{2})
- Elevation: 1,598 ft (487 m)

Population (2020)
  - Total: 1,155
  - Density: 33.6/sq mi (13.0/km^{2})
- Time zone: UTC-6 (Central (CST))
  - Summer (DST): UTC-5 (CDT)
- Area codes: 715 & 534
- FIPS code: 55-41887
- GNIS feature ID: 1583518

Lake Tomahawk is a town in Oneida County, Wisconsin, United States, named for the adjacent freshwater lake of the same name. The population was 1,155 at the 2020 census. The census-designated place of Lake Tomahawk and the unincorporated community of Sunflower are located in the town.

== Geography ==
According to the United States Census Bureau, the town has a total area of 39.2 square miles (101.6 km^{2}), of which 34.3 square miles (88.9 km^{2}) is land and 4.9 square miles (12.7 km^{2}) (12.50%) is water.

=== Climate ===
The climate is Humid Continental in the Köppen Climate System, abbreviated as Dfb.

== Demographics ==
As of the census of 2000, there were 1,160 people, 475 households, and 317 families residing in the town. The population density was 33.8 people per square mile (13.1/km^{2}). There were 1,052 housing units at an average density of 30.7 per square mile (11.8/km^{2}). The racial makeup of the town was 93.97% White, 4.40% African American, 0.78% Native American, 0.26% Asian, 0.09% from other races, and 0.52% from two or more races. Hispanic or Latino of any race were 0.69% of the population.

There were 475 households, out of which 21.9% had children under the age of 18 living with them, 57.5% were married couples living together, 6.5% had a female householder with no husband present, and 33.1% were non-families. 27.6% of all households were made up of individuals, and 11.6% had someone living alone who was 65 years of age or older. The average household size was 2.18 and the average family size was 2.60.

In the town, the population was spread out, with 16.6% under the age of 18, 6.9% from 18 to 24, 29.7% from 25 to 44, 26.9% from 45 to 64, and 20.0% who were 65 years of age or older. The median age was 43 years. For every 100 females, there were 123.5 males. For every 100 females age 18 and over, there were 128.8 males.

The median income for a household in the town was $38,065, and the median income for a family was $41,131. Males had a median income of $30,268 versus $20,870 for females. The per capita income for the town was $19,177. About 3.6% of families and 4.7% of the population were below the poverty line, including 9.4% of those under age 18 and 4.6% of those age 65 or over.

== Transportation ==
=== Major highways ===
Wisconsin Highway 47 is the main road through the town.

=== Airports ===
The Rhinelander-Oneida County Airport (KRHI) serves Lake Tomahawk, the county and surrounding communities with both scheduled commercial jet service and general aviation services. Dolhun Field Airport is a private airport located 1.54 miles (2.48 km) northwest of Lake Tomahawk.

== Recreation ==
Lake Tomahawk is promoted as the "World Capital of Snowshoe Baseball". The game is similar to regular baseball, except the players wear snowshoes and the field is covered in sawdust.
