= Tomahawk River =

Coordinates: 45.48136°N 89.75375°W

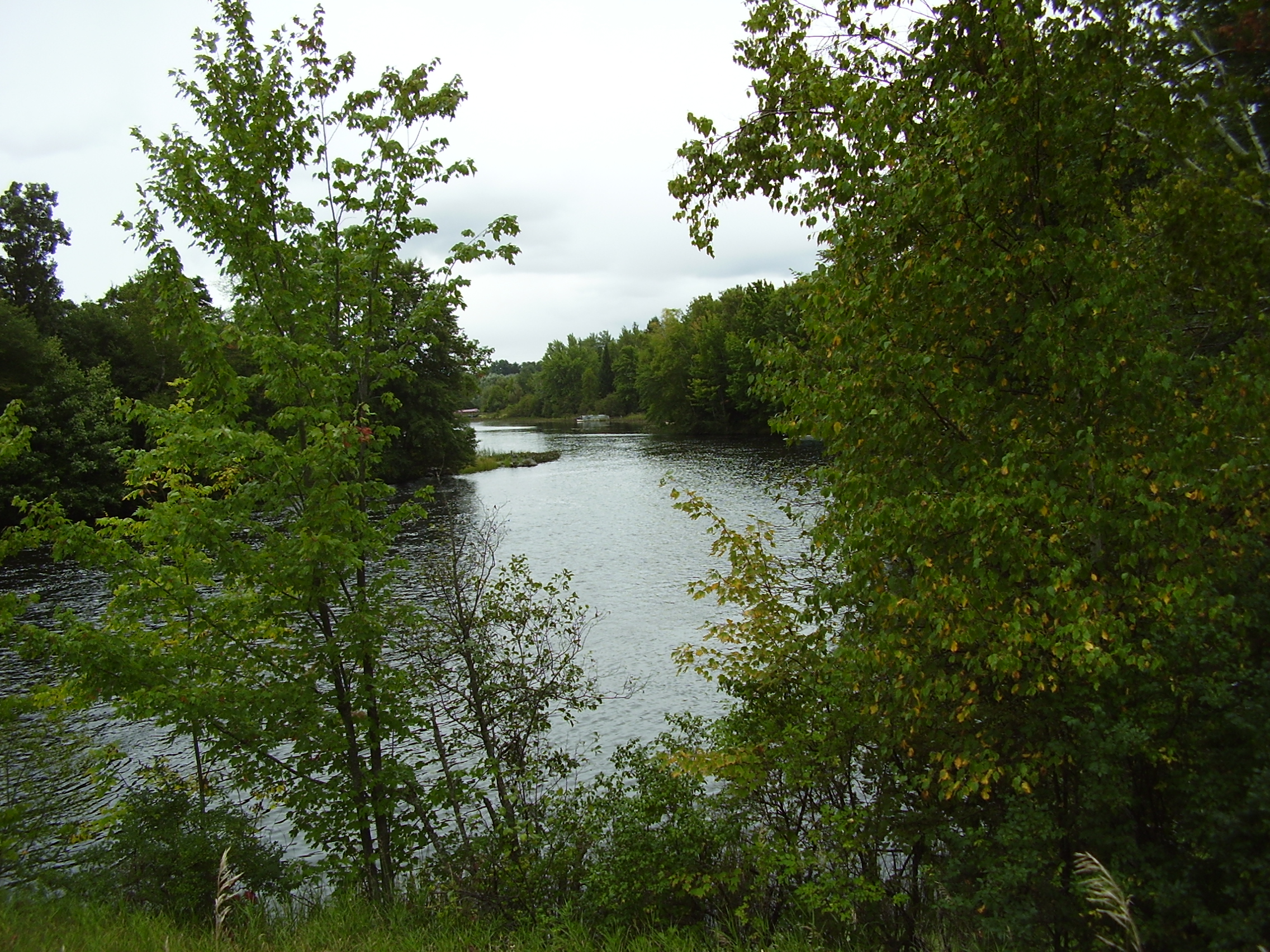
- Tomahawk River near its mouth.

Location
- Country: United States
- State: Wisconsin
- Region: Vilas County, Oneida County, Lincoln County

Physical characteristics
- Source: Tomahawk Lake
  - location: Vilas County
- Mouth: Confluence with the Wisconsin River
  - location: Tomahawk

Basin features
- Tributaries
  - left: Rocky Run, Little Rice Creek
  - right: Squirrel River, Willow River, Little Rice River

The Tomahawk River is a river in Wisconsin.

It is the largest tributary of the Wisconsin River in terms of flow. It begins at Tomahawk Lake in southern Vilas County, flows through Oneida County, and terminates at Lake Mohawksin in Tomahawk. It flows through the Willow Reservoir and Lake Nokomis (artificial reservoirs), and Kawaguesaga Lake and Minocqua Lake (natural lakes).

At one time the Tomahawk River was known as the Little Wisconsin River. Historically it was part of the most important north-south travel route in Wisconsin for both Indians and non-Indians (fur traders).
