= Wisconsin Highway 97 =

State highway in Wood, Marathon, and Taylor counties in Wisconsin, United States

State Trunk Highway 97
- WIS 97 highlighted in red

Route information
- Maintained by WisDOT
- Length: 36.65 mi (58.98 km)

Major junctions
- South end: WIS 13 / Bus. WIS 13 in Marshfield
- North end: WIS 64 in Goodrich

Location
- Country: United States
- State: Wisconsin
- Counties: Wood, Marathon, Taylor

Highway system
- Wisconsin State Trunk Highway System; Interstate; US; State; Scenic; Rustic
← WIS 96	→ WIS 98

State Trunk Highway 97 (often called Highway 97, STH-97 or WIS 97) is a state highway in the U.S. state of Wisconsin. It runs north–south in central Wisconsin for 36.65 miles (58.98 km) from WIS 64 near Goodrich to WIS 13 in Marshfield.

== Route description ==
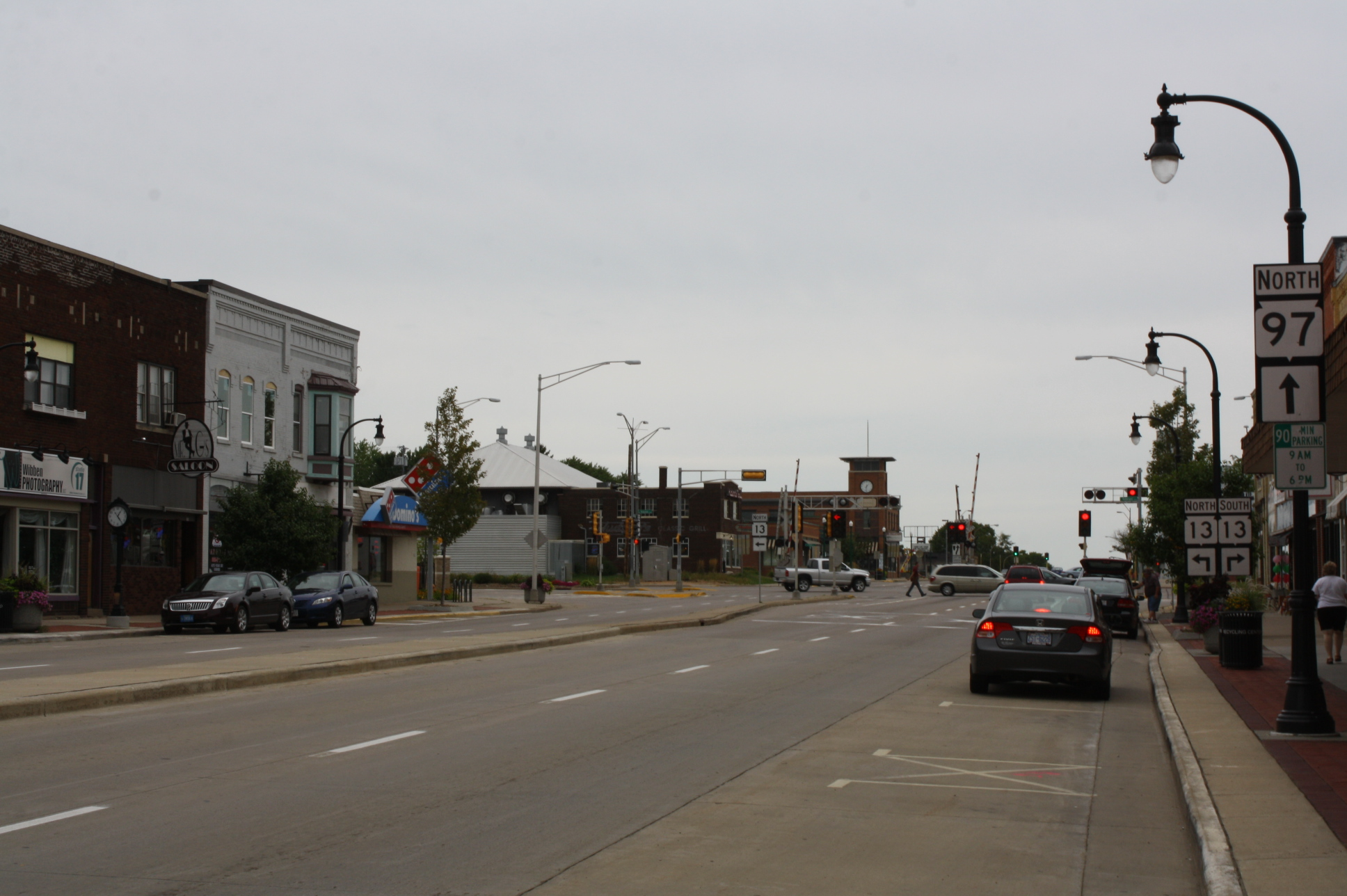
Looking north from southern terminus

WIS 97 starts at the intersection of WIS 13 and heads northeast. The road continues as Central Avenue southwest of the intersection and is signed as a special route of WIS 13. The highway then heads north and runs straight through Stratford as Weber Avenue and intersects WIS 153. It then goes through a diamond interchange with WIS 29 near Wuertsburg, then continues due North towards Athens. It then makes a right turn and then heads north again, crossing Black Creek. The route then merges with CTH-L and heads west and then continues north after splitting with CTH-L until terminating at WIS 64 west of Goodrich. The road continues north as Mink Drive and becomes a dirt road.

== History ==
The Wisconsin Department of Transportation (WisDOT) reconstructed the stretch between Northridge Street in Marshfield to Reflection Street in Stratford to increase traffic safety along the stretch. There were approximately 216 crashes that took place in that stretch between 2012 and 2016. The construction involved replacing the existing asphalt, widening the shoulders and adding rumble strips, replacing the guardrail and deteriorated culvert pipes, and modify the intersections of CTH-AAA, Galvin Road, Staadt Avenue, and CTH-C by widening and adding left turn lanes to separate turning traffic from thru traffic. The construction was completed in 2023.

== Major intersections ==
County	Location	mi	km	Destinations	Notes
Wood	Marshfield	0.0	0.0	WIS 13 (Veterans Parkway)	Southern terminus; road continues southwest as Central Avenue
Wood	Marshfield	0.4	0.64	CTH-Y (Doege Street)	
Marathon	Marshfield	1.7	2.7	CTH-E (Peach Avenue)	
Marathon	McMillan	5.3	8.5	CTH-T	
Marathon	McMillan	7.3	11.7	CTH-C	Southern end of CTH-C concurrency
Marathon	McMillan	8.3	13.4	CTH-C	Northern end of CTH-C concurrency
Marathon	Stratford	11.6	18.7	WIS 153 (Fir Street)	
Marathon	Eau Pleine	15.9	25.6	CTH-P	
Marathon	Wien	18.9	30.4	CTH-N	
Marathon	Wuertsburg	21.8	35.1	WIS 29 – Chippewa Falls, Wausau	Diamond interchange exit 145
Marathon		25.8	41.5	CTH-A / CTH-M	Southern end of CTH-A/CTH-M concurrency
Marathon	Athens	27.9	44.9	CTH-M (Mueller St.)	Northern end of CTH-M concurrency
Marathon		29.0	46.7	CTH-A	Northern end of CTH-A concurrency
Marathon		31.2	50.2	CTH-L	Eastern end of CTH-L concurrency
Marathon		31.9	51.3	CTH-L	Western end of CTH-L concurrency
Taylor	Goodrich	36.65	58.98	WIS 64 – Medford, Merrill	Northern terminus
1.000 mi = 1.609 km; 1.000 km = 0.621 mi: Concurrency terminus
