= Wisconsin Highway 153 =

State highway in Wisconsin, United States

State Trunk Highway 153
- WIS 153 highlighted in red

Route information
- Maintained by WisDOT
- Length: 61.25 mi (98.57 km)
- Existed: 1925–present

Major junctions
- West end: WIS 13 in Spencer
- I-39 / US 51 in Mosinee
- East end: US 45 in Tigerton

Location
- Country: United States
- State: Wisconsin
- Counties: Marathon, Shawano

Highway system
- Wisconsin State Trunk Highway System; Interstate; US; State; Scenic; Rustic
← WIS 152	→ WIS 154

State Trunk Highway 153 (often called Highway 153, STH-153 or WIS 153) is a 61.25 miles (98.57 km) state highway in Marathon and Shawano counties in central Wisconsin, United States, that runs in east–west from Spencer to Tigerton, passing through Mosinee and Stratford. The highway was originally designated in 1925 between WIS 97 in Stratford and WIS 10 in Mosinee. It was extended west to its present western terminus and east to WIS 49 in 1947. It was extended again to its present eastern terminus in the early 1960s.

== Route description ==
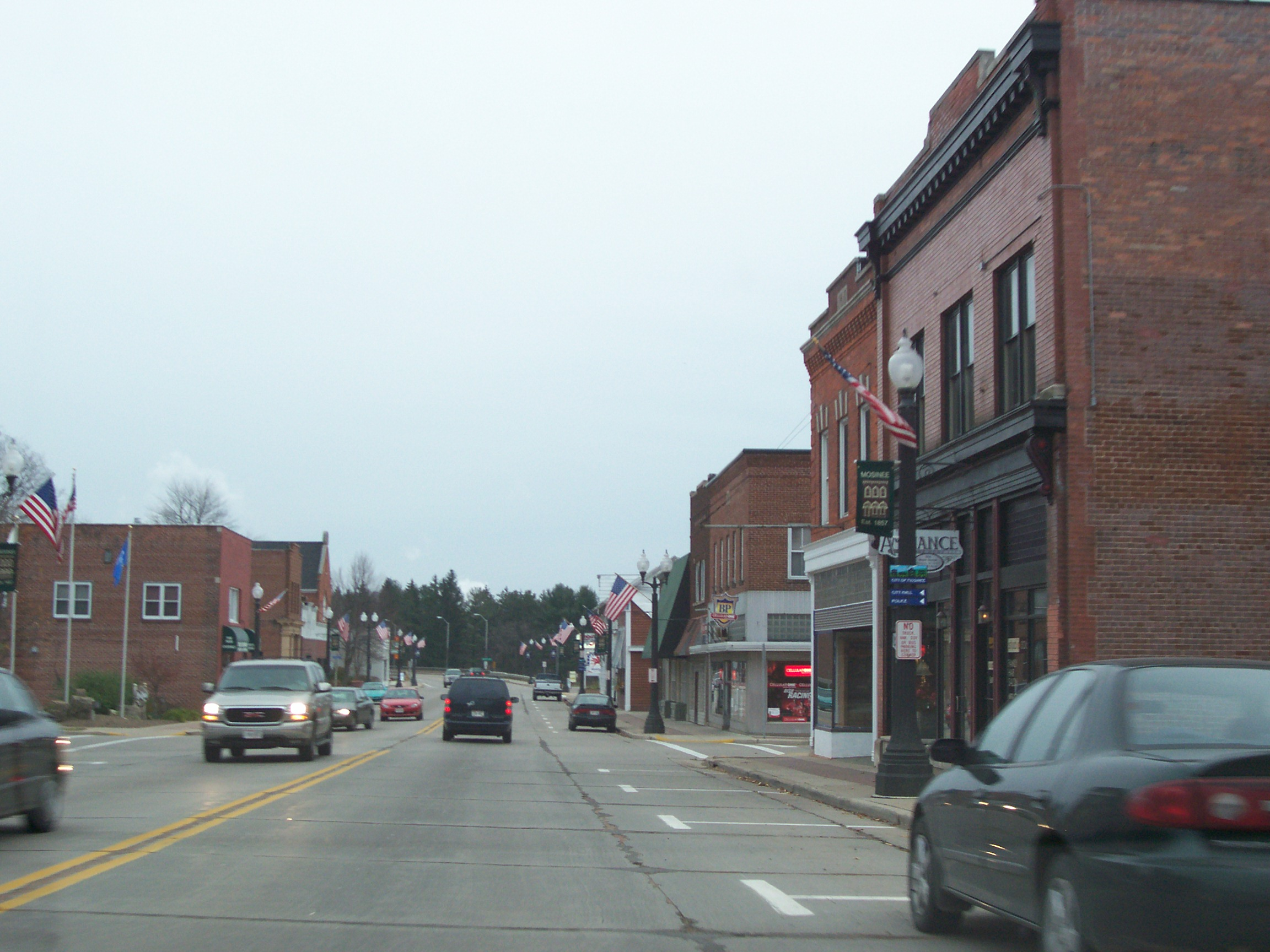
Highway 153 in Downtown Mosinee, 2007

The highway begins at its intersection with WIS 13 and 153rd Road north of Stratford and continues eastward from it. It passes by WIS 97 (North Weber Avenue) in Stratford and various small communities before it enters Moisinee. The highway runs through downtown Mosinee and intersects with County Trunk Highway B (CTH-B, Main Street) and continues east on Main Street before running south on Old Highway 51 for a short distance before continuing east, passing through an interchange with Interstate 39 (I-39) and US Highway 51 (US 51) and by Central Wisconsin Airport. The highway runs south through a short concurrency with CTH-J before running east from it. It later runs north towards Mission Lake Road and continues east along its alignment, intersecting WIS 49 before ending at US 45 in the town of Wittenberg.

== History ==
The WIS 153 designation first appeared on the state highway map in 1925 as a largely unpaved route from WIS 97 in Stratford to WIS 10 in Mosinee. The section west of WIS 97 was signed as CTH-M. In 1927, the same year WIS 10 was redesignated as US 51, a section east of US 51 was signed as CTH-K.

In 1939, a bill proposing an extension of the highway was heard in the Wisconsin Legislature, though this was indefinitely postponed. The first two extensions were built in 1947, extending the highway 11 miles (18 km) west along the alignment of CTH-B to WIS 13 and 16 miles (26 km) east along CTH-K to WIS 49 in Elderon. A third extension was built in 1961 or 1962, extending the highway 6 miles (10 km) further east from Elderon along CTH-K to its present eastern terminus at US 45 near Whitcomb.

== Major intersections ==
County	Location	mi	km	Destinations	Notes
Marathon	Town of Brighton	0.0	0.0	WIS 13 – Abbotsford, Marshfield	
Marathon	Stratford	11.3	18.2	WIS 97 – Athens, Marshfield	
Marathon	Town of Emmet	22.8	36.7	WIS 107 north – Marathon City	
Marathon	Mosinee	29.9	48.1	CTH-B north	
Marathon	Mosinee	31.3	50.4	I-39 / US 51 – Wausau, Stevens Point	
Marathon	Town of Reid	42.8	68.9	CTH-J north	Northern end of CTH-J concurrency
Marathon	Reid–Bevent town line	43.8	70.5	CTH-J south	Southern end of CTH-J concurrency
Marathon	Elderon	54.7	88.0	WIS 49 – Iola	
Shawano	Town of Wittenberg	61.1	98.3	US 45 – Wittenberg, Clintonville, New London	
1.000 mi = 1.609 km; 1.000 km = 0.621 mi: Concurrency terminus
