= Wisconsin Highway 98 =

State highway in Wisconsin, United States

State Trunk Highway 98
- WIS 98 highlighted in red

Route information
- Maintained by WisDOT
- Length: 16.20 mi (26.07 km)

Major junctions
- West end: WIS 73 south of Greenwood
- CTH-K in Loyal
- East end: WIS 13 / CTH-C in Spencer

Location
- Country: United States
- State: Wisconsin
- Counties: Clark, Marathon

Highway system
- Wisconsin State Trunk Highway System; Interstate; US; State; Scenic; Rustic
← WIS 97	→ WIS 99

State Trunk Highway 98 (often called Highway 98, STH-98 or WIS 98) is a state highway in the U.S. state of Wisconsin. It runs east–west in central Wisconsin from near Greenwood to Spencer.

== Route description ==
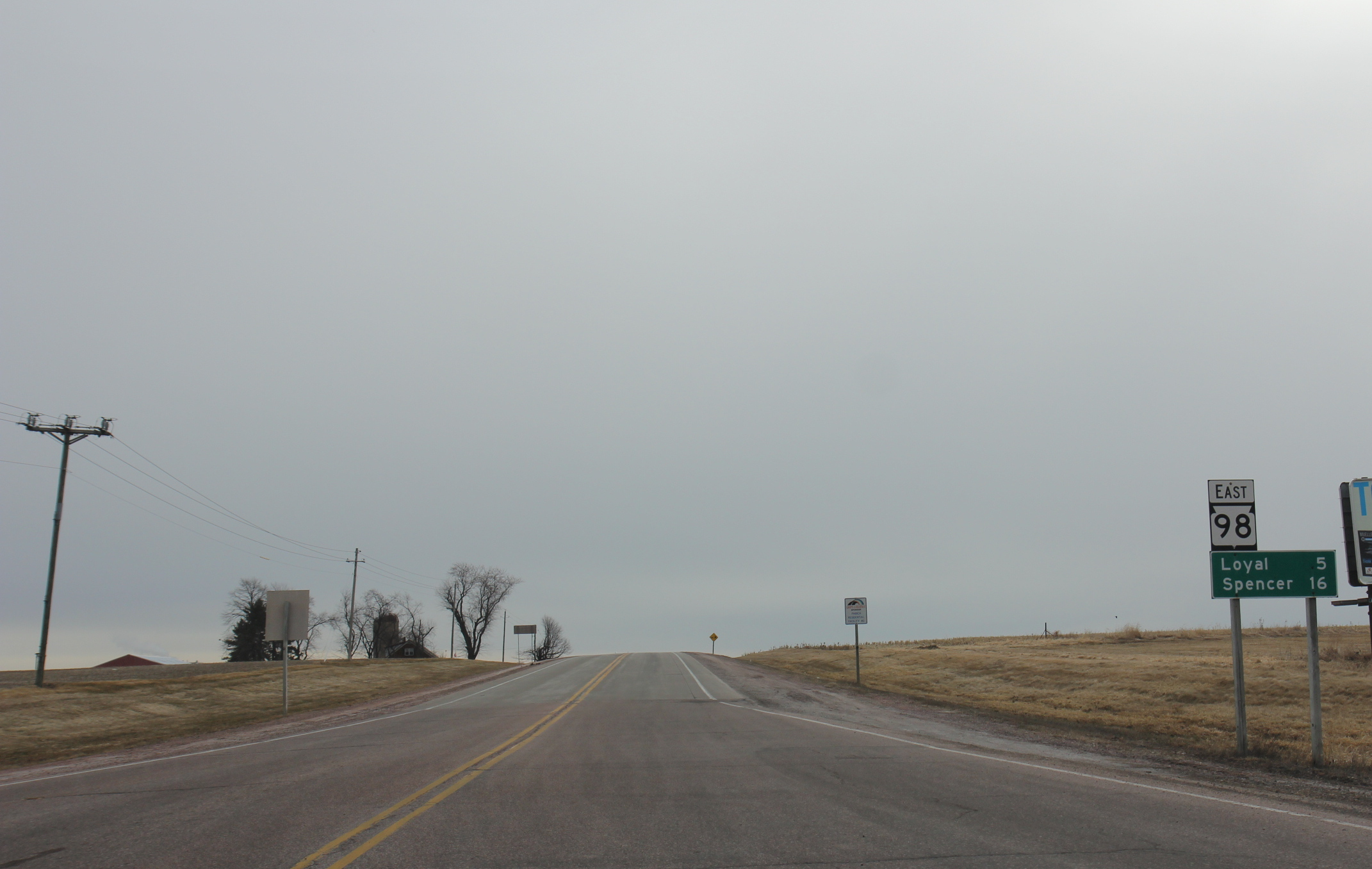
Western terminus

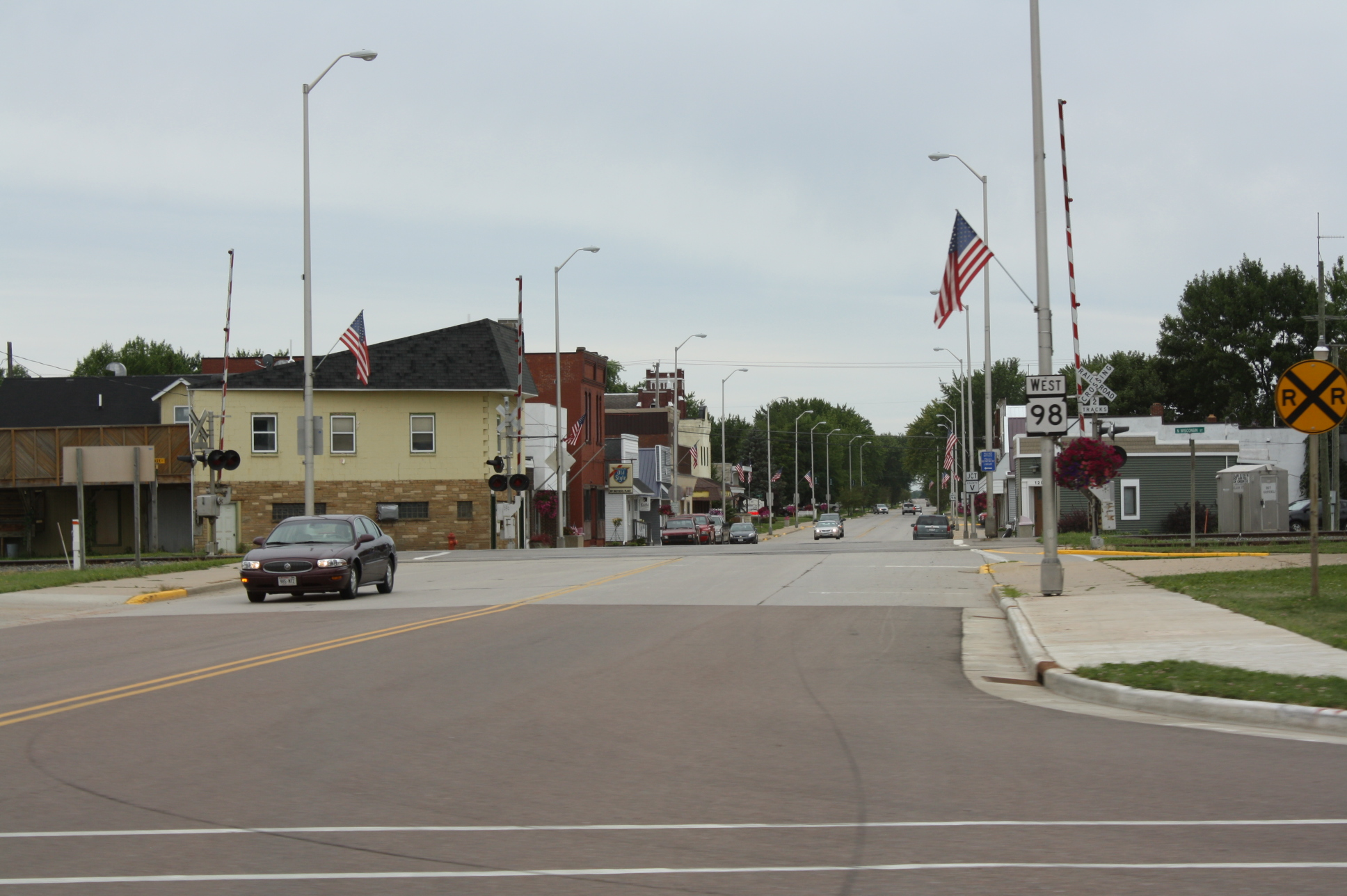
Eastern terminus in Spencer

WIS 98 starts at an intersection with WIS 73 south of Greenwood. From this terminus, the highway runs eastward through agricultural areas in rural Clark County. In the city of Loyal, WIS 98 follows South Street through residential neighborhoods to a junction with Main Street. There, the highway turns north along Main Street through the downtown area to an intersection with Elm Street. WIS 98 turns east again to follow Elm Street out of town, returning to rural farm land in the process. The highway then follows Coles Corner Road to a junction with County Trunk Highway Y (CTH-Y) near the Coles Cemetery, where WIS 98 turns north for about one mile (1.5 km). Curving back to an easterly path, the highway enters Spencer on Clark Street running through more residential neighborhoods. WIS 98 ends at the intersection in the middle of town with WIS 13 (Pacific Street).

== History ==
WIS 98 was shown as a proposed highway on maps in 1921 between Argonne north to the Michigan state line. When the designation was applied to a roadway by 1924, it was designated instead along the current routing.

== Major intersections ==
County	Location	mi	km	Destinations	Notes
Clark	Town of Eaton	0.00	0.00	WIS 73 – Neillsville, Greenwood	
Clark	Loyal	5.00	8.05	CTH-K south (Main Street)	Western end of CTH-K concurrency
Clark	Loyal	5.50	8.85	CTH-K north (Main Street)	Eastern end of CTH-K concurrency
Clark	Town of Sherman	12.30	19.79	CTH-Y south	
Marathon	Spencer	16.00	25.75	CTH-V south (Lasalle Street)	
Marathon	Spencer	16.20	26.07	WIS 13 (Pacific Street) – Abbotsford, Marshfield; CTH-C (Clark Street)	Roadway continues as CTH-C
1.000 mi = 1.609 km; 1.000 km = 0.621 mi
