= Frankfort, Wisconsin =

Frankfort, Wisconsin is the name of some places in the U.S. state of Wisconsin:

- Frankfort, Marathon County, Wisconsin, a town
- Frankfort, Pepin County, Wisconsin, a town
