= Bradley, Wisconsin (disambiguation) =

Bradley may refer to the following places in the U.S. state of Wisconsin:

- Bradley, Wisconsin, a town in Lincoln County
- Bradley (community), Lincoln County, Wisconsin, an unincorporated community in Lincoln County
- Bradley, Marathon County, Wisconsin, an unincorporated community in Marathon County
