= Callon =

Callon may refer to:

- Callon, Wisconsin, an unincorporated community
- The Callon estate, a part of Preston, Lancashire, a city in Lancashire, England
- Michel Callon (1945–2025), a French sociologist
- Callon of Epidaurus, an intersex person
