= Spencer (town), Wisconsin =

Spencer, Wisconsin
- Town
- Town of Spencer
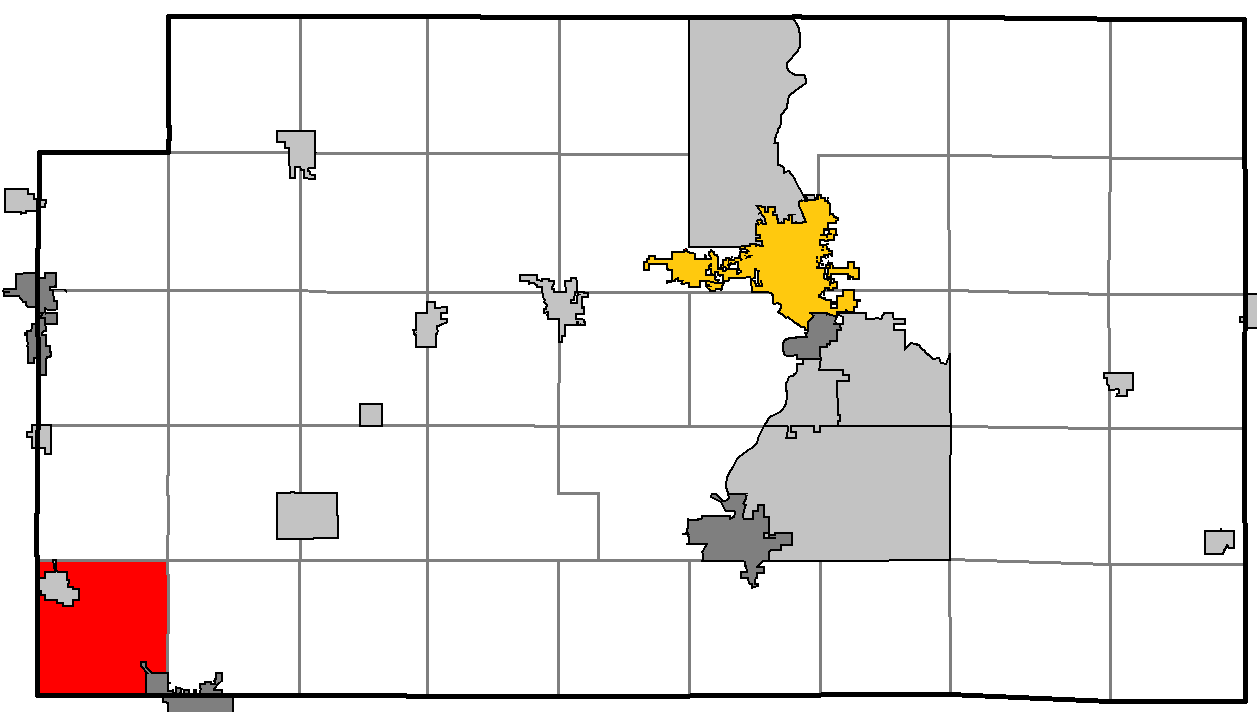
- Location of Spencer, Marathon County

- Location of Marathon County, Wisconsin
- Coordinates: 44°43′31″N 90°14′54″W
- Country: United States
- State: Wisconsin
- County: Marathon

Area
  - Total: 31.67 sq mi (82.0 km^{2})
  - Land: 31.46 sq mi (81.5 km^{2})
  - Water: 0.21 sq mi (0.54 km^{2})

Population (2020)
  - Total: 1,586
  - Density: 50.41/sq mi (19.46/km^{2})
- Time zone: UTC-6 (Central (CST))
  - Summer (DST): UTC-5 (CDT)
- Area code(s): 715 and 534
- GNIS feature ID: 1584184
- Website: https://www.townofspencerwi.gov/

The Town of Spencer is located in Marathon County, Wisconsin, United States. It is part of the Wausau, WI Metropolitan Statistical Area. The population was 1,586 at the 2020 census. The village of Spencer is located in the northeastern part of the town.The unincorporated community of Mann also is located in the town.

== Geography ==
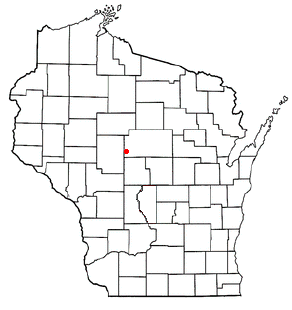
Location of Spencer (town), Wisconsin

According to the United States Census Bureau, the town has a total area of 31.7 square miles (82.2 km^{2}), of which 31.5 square miles (81.6 km^{2}) is land and 0.2 square miles (0.5 km^{2}), or 0.63%, is water.

== Demographics ==
As of the census of 2000, there were 1,341 people, 475 households, and 378 families living in the town. The population density was 42.5 people per square mile (16.4/km^{2}). There were 496 housing units at an average density of 15.7 per square mile (6.1/km^{2}). The racial makeup of the town was 98.43% White, 0.30% Native American, 0.37% Asian, 0.75% from other races, and 0.15% from two or more races. 0.89% of the population were Hispanic or Latino of any race.

There were 475 households, out of which 42.5% had children under the age of 18 living with them, 67.4% were married couples living together, 6.1% had a female householder with no husband present, and 20.4% were non-families. 15.4% of all households were made up of individuals, and 4.8% had someone living alone who was 65 years of age or older. The average household size was 2.82 and the average family size was 3.15.

The population distribution was 29.5% under the age of 18, 7.8% from 18 to 24, 33.6% from 25 to 44, 21.0% from 45 to 64, and 8.0% who were 65 years of age or older. The median age was 35 years. For every 100 females, there were 104.1 males. For every 100 females age 18 and over, there were 110.0 males.

The median income for a household in the town was $47,315, and the median income for a family was $49,773. Males had a median income of $31,042 versus $22,619 for females. The per capita income for the town was $17,702. About 3.6% of families and 3.8% of the population were below the poverty line, including 4.3% of those under age 18 and 5.9% of those age 65 or over.
