= Wisconsin Highway 107 =

State highway in Wisconsin, United States

State Trunk Highway 107
- WIS 107 highlighted in red

Route information
- Maintained by WisDOT
- Length: 56.23 mi (90.49 km)

Major junctions
- South end: WIS 153 in Mosinee
- North end: CTH-S in Tomahawk

Location
- Country: United States
- State: Wisconsin
- Counties: Marathon, Lincoln

Highway system
- Wisconsin State Trunk Highway System; Interstate; US; State; Scenic; Rustic
← WIS 106	→ WIS 108

State Trunk Highway 107 (often called Highway 107, STH-107 or WIS 107) is a state highway in the U.S. state of Wisconsin. It runs in a north–south direction in central Wisconsin from west of Mosinee to south of Tomahawk.

== Route description ==
WIS 107 begins at its intersection with WIS 153, a little more than five miles (8.0 km) west of Mosinee. Most of WIS 107's routing travels through the remote areas of central Wisconsin, following the flowage of the Wisconsin River.

=== Mosinee to Merrill ===
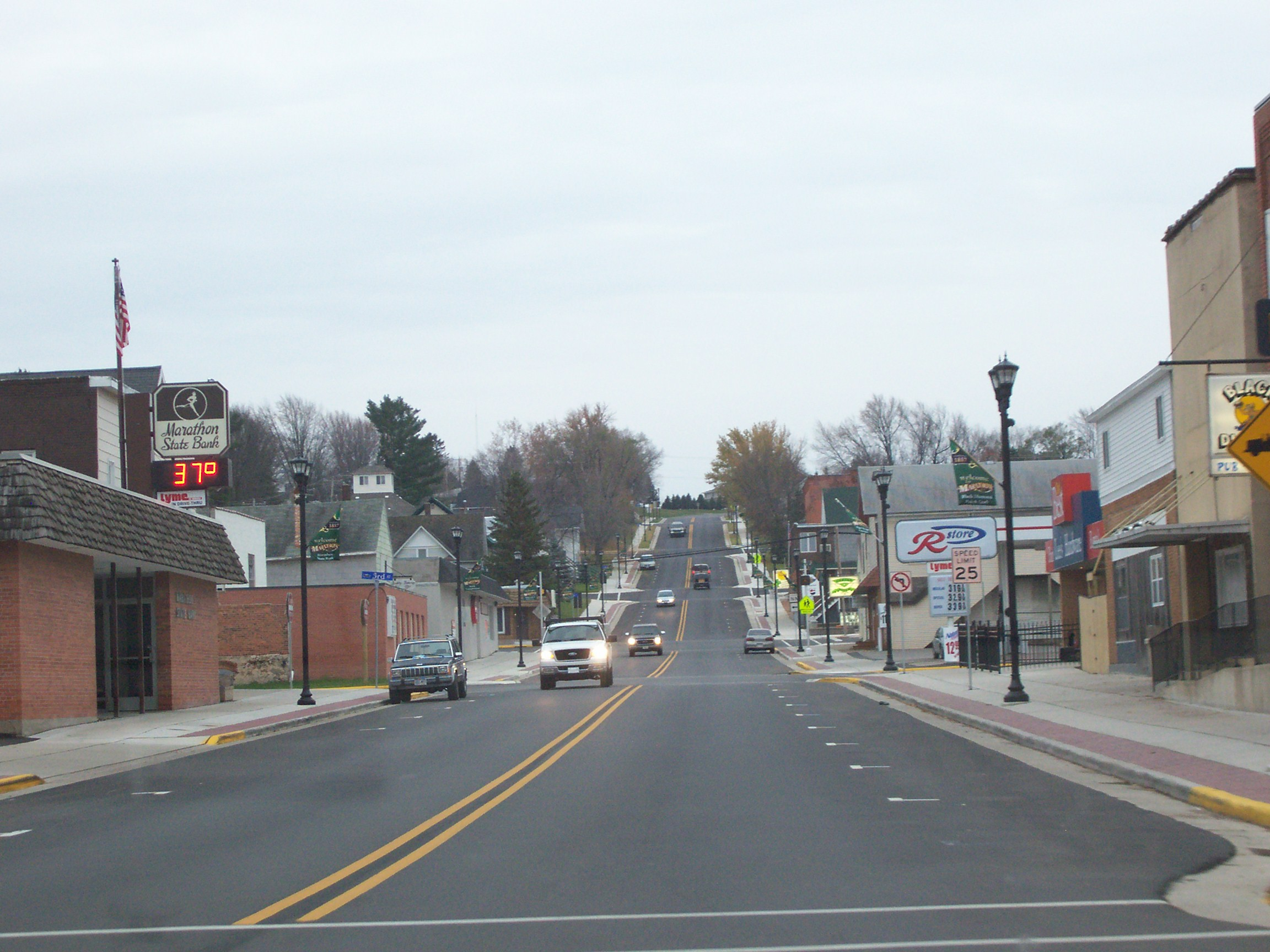
WIS107 in downtown Marathon City

WIS 107 heads due north from WIS 153 into the village of Marathon City, where it becomes Main Street. Crossing the Big Rib River, it meets up with WIS 29 at the latter's exit 156.

WIS 107 continues north into the unincorporated community of Little Chicago. About two miles north of the Marathon/Lincoln County line, it intersects with Wisconsin Highway 64 and continues north, then east, with WIS 64 towards Merrill.

=== Merrill ===
Entering Merrill, WIS 107 and WIS 64 run alongside the banks of the Wisconsin River, across from Council Grounds State Park. After briefly running through the city of Merrill's Sixth Ward along West Main Street, the two highways cross over the Wisconsin River—twice. The river is divided by a small island where West Main Street crosses into the uptown portion of the city of Merrill.

The two highways separate at the Y-intersection of Grand Avenue and Main Street; WIS 64 continues east over the Prairie River into downtown Merrill, while WIS 107 turns sharply to the northwest along Grand Avenue.

WIS 107 continues northwest, past the Merrill Area Recreation Complex and the main entrance to Council Grounds State Park, before turning north out of the city.

=== Merrill to Tomahawk ===
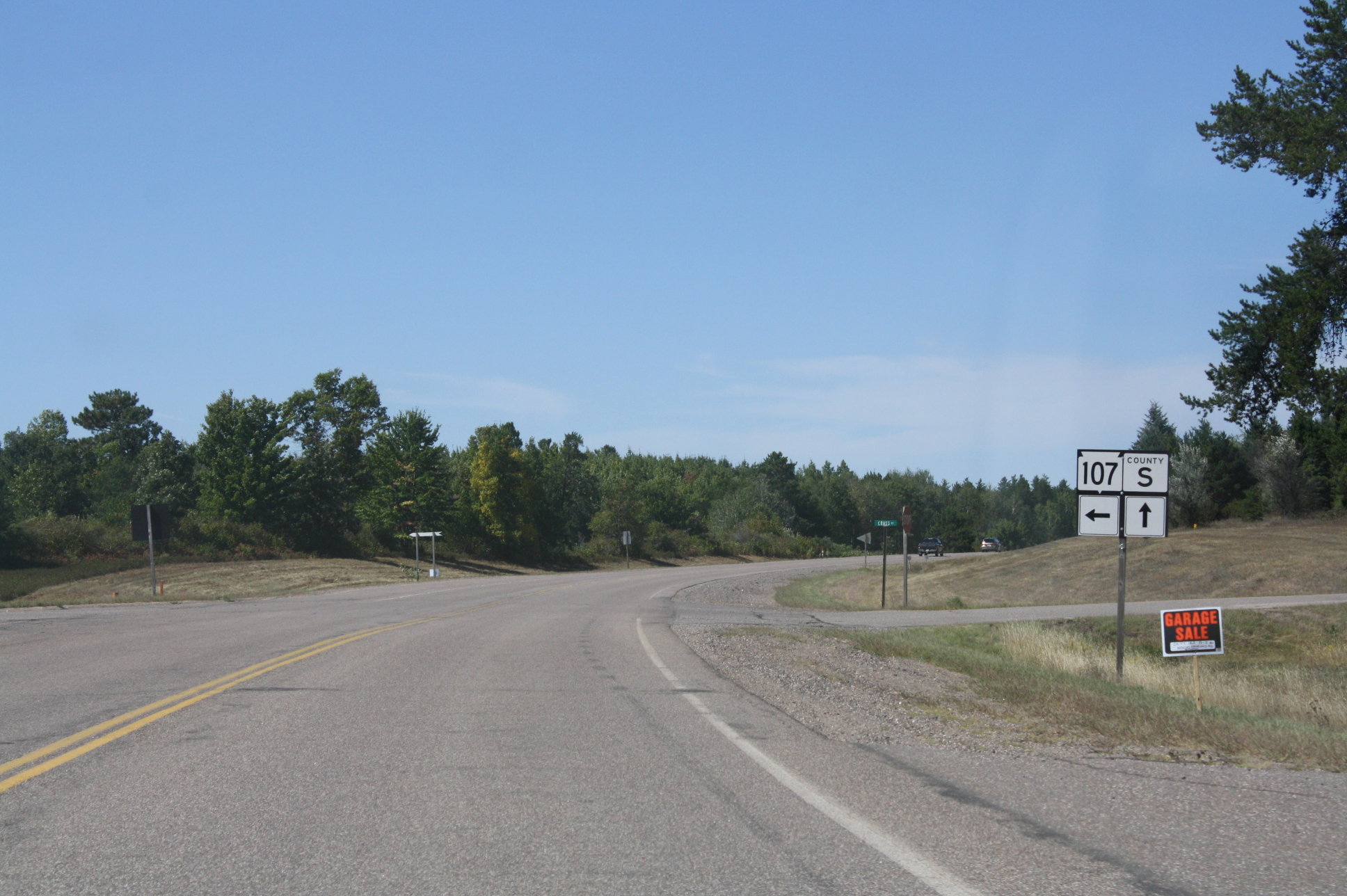
Northern terminus by Tomahawk

North of Merrill, WIS 107 runs along the eastern banks of the Wisconsin River as a rural two-lane highway all the way to its northern terminus with County Trunk Highway S (CTH-S) outside of Tomahawk. The terminus is somewhat unusual, as state highways in Wisconsin normally end at another state trunk highway. CTH-S, however, was the former route of US Highway 51 (US 51) as it entered Tomahawk. When the US 51 bypass freeway was finished east of the city, the former route of US 51 was turned back to county control, resulting in the unusual terminus.

== Major intersections ==
County	Location	mi	km	Destinations	Notes
Marathon	Town of Emmet			WIS 153 – Mosinee, Stratford	
Marathon	Marathon City			WIS 29 – Wausau, Abbotsford	
Lincoln	Town of Corning			WIS 64 west – Medford	Southern end of WIS 64 concurrency
Lincoln	Merrill			WIS 64 east – Antigo	Northern end of WIS 64 concurrency
Lincoln	Town of Bradley			CTH-S – Tomahawk, Merrill	
1.000 mi = 1.609 km; 1.000 km = 0.621 mi: Concurrency terminus
