= Elderon, Wisconsin =

- Village
- The intersection of WIS 49 and WIS 153 in Elderon

- Location of Elderon in Marathon County, Wisconsin.
- Coordinates: 44°48′40″N 89°16′16″W
- Country: United States
- State: Wisconsin
- County: Marathon

Area
  - Total: 1.13 sq mi (2.93 km^{2})
  - Land: 1.12 sq mi (2.91 km^{2})
  - Water: 0.0077 sq mi (0.02 km^{2})
- Elevation: 1,253 ft (382 m)

Population (2020)
  - Total: 161
  - Density: 143/sq mi (55.3/km^{2})
- Time zone: UTC-6 (Central (CST))
  - Summer (DST): UTC-5 (CDT)
- Area codes: 715 & 534
- FIPS code: 55-23100
- GNIS feature ID: 1564498

Elderon is a village in Marathon County, Wisconsin, United States. It is part of the Wausau, Wisconsin Metropolitan Statistical Area. The population was 161 at the 2020 census.

== History ==
A post office called Elderon has been in operation since 1888. The village was named for a grove of elder trees near the town site.

== Geography ==
Elderon is located at 44°46′59″N 89°15′1″W (44.78325, -89.250492).

According to the United States Census Bureau, the village has a total area of 1.16 square miles (3.00 km^{2}), of which 1.10 square miles (2.85 km^{2}) is land and 0.06 square miles (0.16 km^{2}) is water.

== Demographics ==
Historical population
Census	Pop.	Note	%±
1920	215		—
1930	181		−15.8%
1940	249		37.6%
1950	212		−14.9%
1960	177		−16.5%
1970	185		4.5%
1980	191		3.2%
1990	175		−8.4%
2000	189		8.0%
2010	179		−5.3%
2020	161		−10.1%
U.S. Decennial Census

=== 2010 census ===
As of the census of 2010, there were 179 people, 80 households, and 53 families living in the village. The population density was 162.7 inhabitants per square mile (62.8/km^{2}). There were 83 housing units at an average density of 75.5 per square mile (29.2/km^{2}). The racial makeup of the village was 92.7% White, 1.1% Native American, 4.5% Pacific Islander, 1.1% from other races, and 0.6% from two or more races. Hispanic or Latino of any race were 3.9% of the population.

There were 80 households, of which 22.5% had children under the age of 18 living with them, 46.3% were married couples living together, 7.5% had a female householder with no husband present, 12.5% had a male householder with no wife present, and 33.8% were non-families. 27.5% of all households were made up of individuals, and 11.3% had someone living alone who was 65 years of age or older. The average household size was 2.24 and the average family size was 2.64.

The median age in the village was 43.4 years. 16.2% of residents were under the age of 18; 13.4% were between the ages of 18 and 24; 22.4% were from 25 to 44; 29.1% were from 45 to 64; and 19% were 65 years of age or older. The gender makeup of the village was 52.0% male and 48.0% female.

=== 2000 census ===
At the 2000 census, there were 189 people, 77 households and 54 families living in the village. The population density was 170.8 per square mile (65.7/km^{2}). There were 81 housing units at an average density of 73.2 per square mile (28.2/km^{2}). The racial makeup of the village was 98.94% White, 0.53% from other races, and 0.53% from two or more races. 4.76% of the population were Hispanic or Latino of any race.

There were 77 households, of which 35.1% had children under the age of 18 living with them, 58.4% were married couples living together, 3.9% had a female householder with no husband present, and 28.6% were non-families. 20.8% of all households were made up of individuals, and 9.1% had someone living alone who was 65 years of age or older. The average household size was 2.45 and the average family size was 2.91.

Age distribution was 24.9% under the age of 18, 4.8% from 18 to 24, 32.3% from 25 to 44, 23.8% from 45 to 64, and 14.3% who were 65 years of age or older. The median age was 39 years. For every 100 females, there were 112.4 males. For every 100 females age 18 and over, there were 97.2 males.

The median household income was $38,125, and the median family income was $55,417. Males had a median income of $27,917 versus $26,250 for females. The per capita income for the village was $19,225. About 2.1% of families and 5.0% of the population were below the poverty line, including none of those under the age of eighteen and 14.8% of those 65 or over.

== Notable people ==
- Roger Breske, business owner and politician
- Arthur J. Plowman, farmer and politician
