= Ashley, Wisconsin =

Unincorporated community in Wisconsin, United States

- unincorporated community
- Location within Wisconsin Location within the United States
- Coordinates: 44°41′34″N 89°36′29″W
- Country: United States
- State: Wisconsin
- County: Marathon
- Elevation: 1,155 ft (352 m)
- Time zone: UTC−6 (Central (CST))
  - Summer (DST): UTC−5 (CDT)
- Area codes: 715 and 534
- GNIS feature ID: 1577497

Ashley is an unincorporated community located in the towns of Guenther and Knowlton, in Marathon County, Wisconsin, United States.
