= Marathon County, Wisconsin =

County in the United States

- County
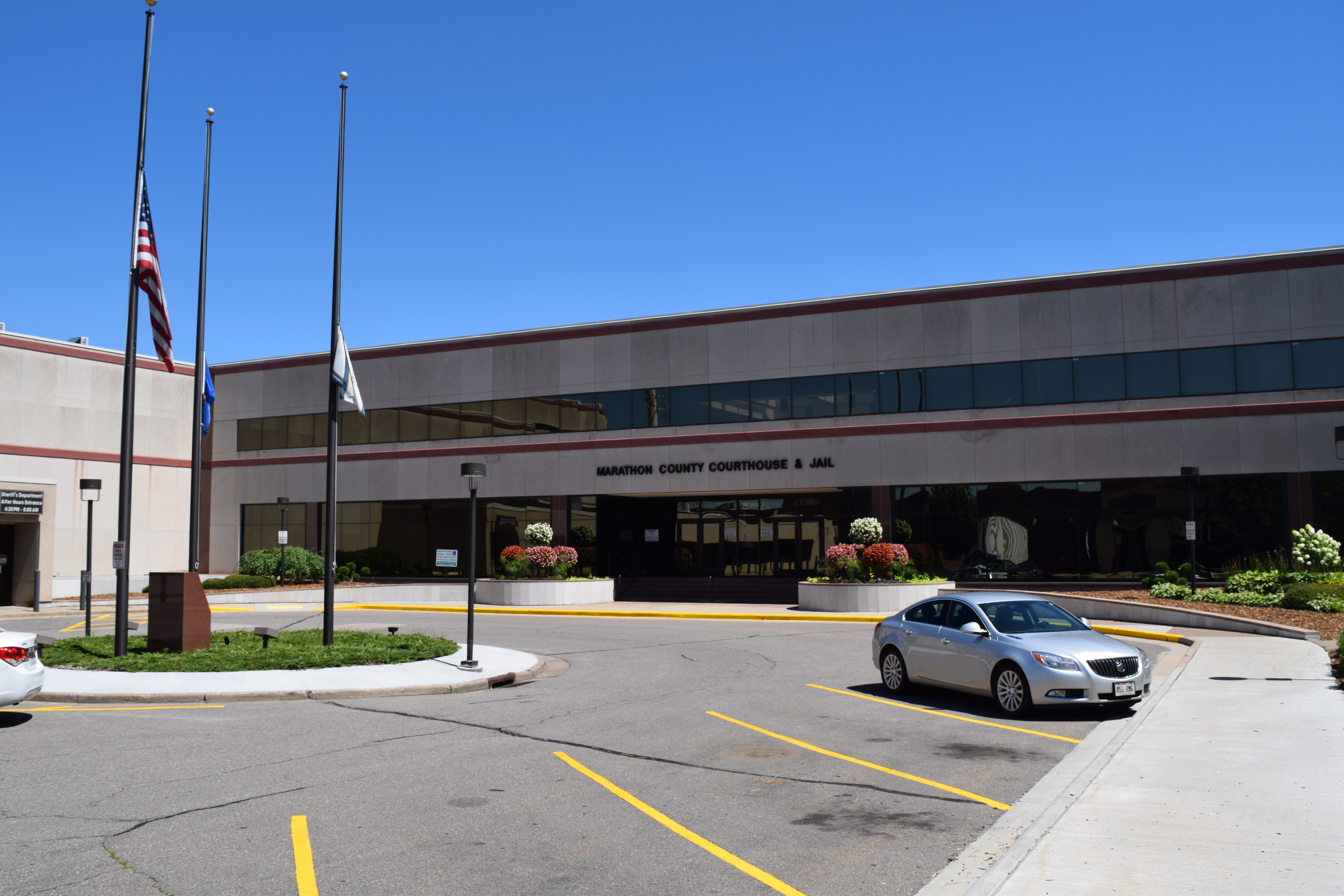
- Marathon County Courthouse in Wausau

- Location within the U.S. state of Wisconsin
- Coordinates: 44°54′N 89°46′W
- Country: United States
- State: Wisconsin
- Founded: 1850
- Named for: Marathon, Greece
- Seat: Wausau
- Largest city: Wausau

Area
  - Total: 1,576 sq mi (4,080 km^{2})
  - Land: 1,545 sq mi (4,000 km^{2})
  - Water: 31 sq mi (80 km^{2}) 2.0%

Population (2020)
  - Total: 138,013
  - Estimate (2025): 139,432 ▲
  - Density: 89.3/sq mi (34.5/km^{2})
- Time zone: UTC−6 (Central)
  - Summer (DST): UTC−5 (CDT)
- Congressional district: 7th
- Website: www.marathoncounty.gov

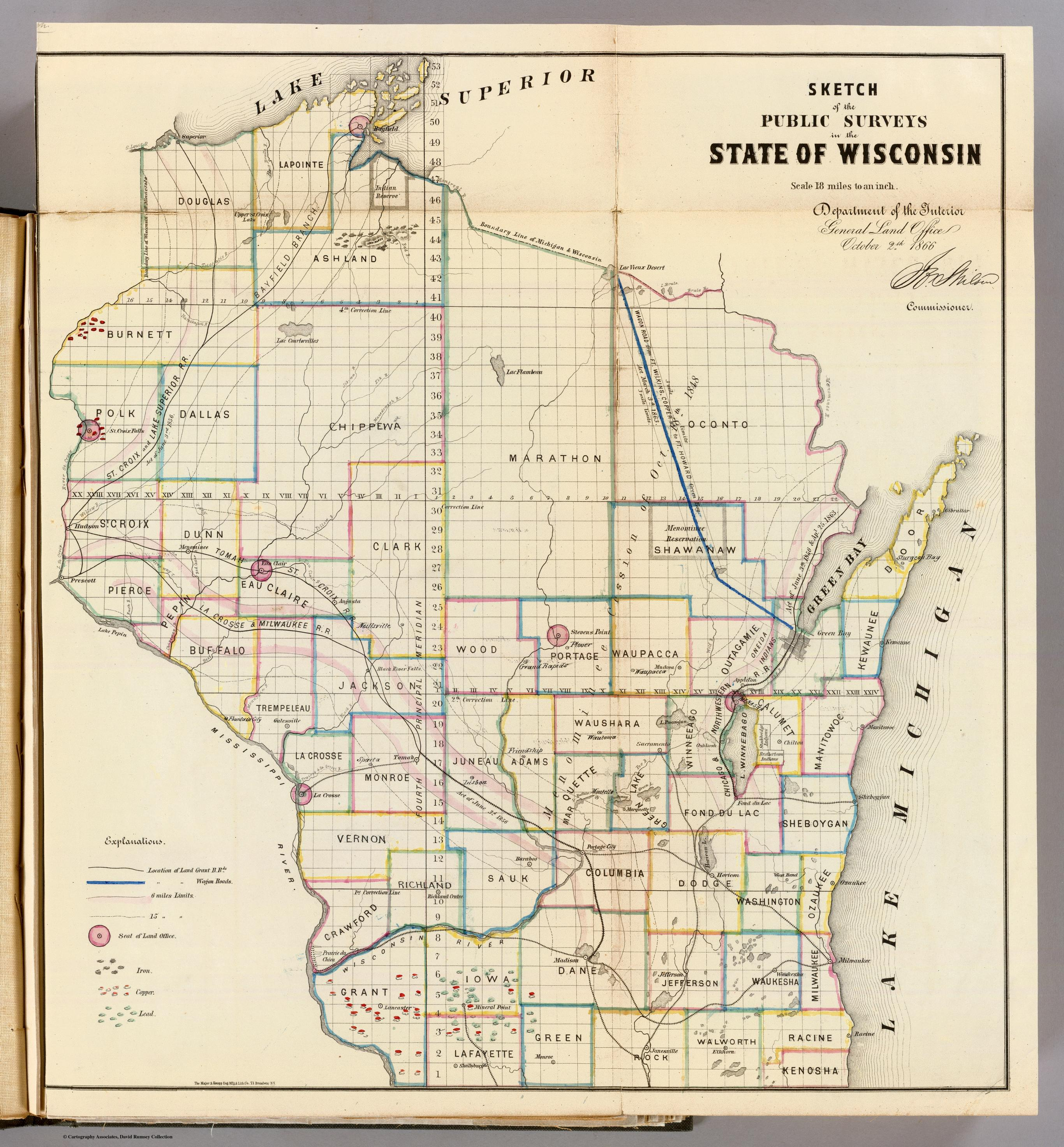
Wisconsin 1866 US land Office

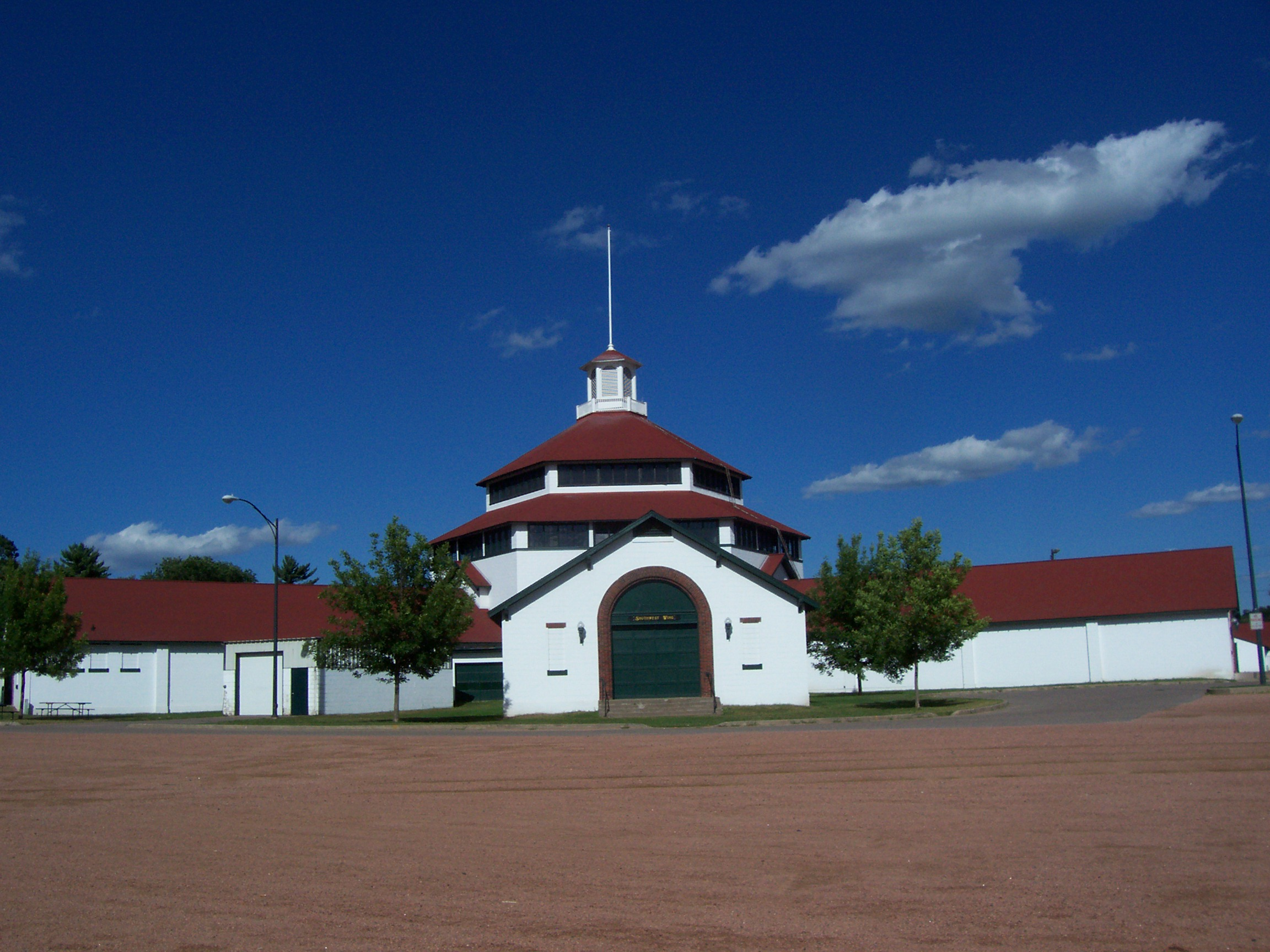
Marathon County Fairgrounds

Marathon County is a county in the U.S. state of Wisconsin. As of the 2020 census, the population was 138,013. Its county seat is Wausau. It was founded in 1850, created from a portion of Portage County. At that time the county stretched to the northern border with the Upper Peninsula of Michigan. It is named after the battlefield at Marathon, Greece.

Marathon County comprises the Wausau, WI Metropolitan Statistical Area and is included in the Wausau–Stevens Point–Wisconsin Rapids, WI Combined Statistical Area.

== Geography ==
According to the U.S. Census Bureau, the county has an area of 1,576 square miles (4,080 km^{2}), of which 1,545 square miles (4,000 km^{2}) is land and 31 square miles (80 km^{2}) (2.0%) is water. It is Wisconsin's largest county by land area and fourth-largest by total area.

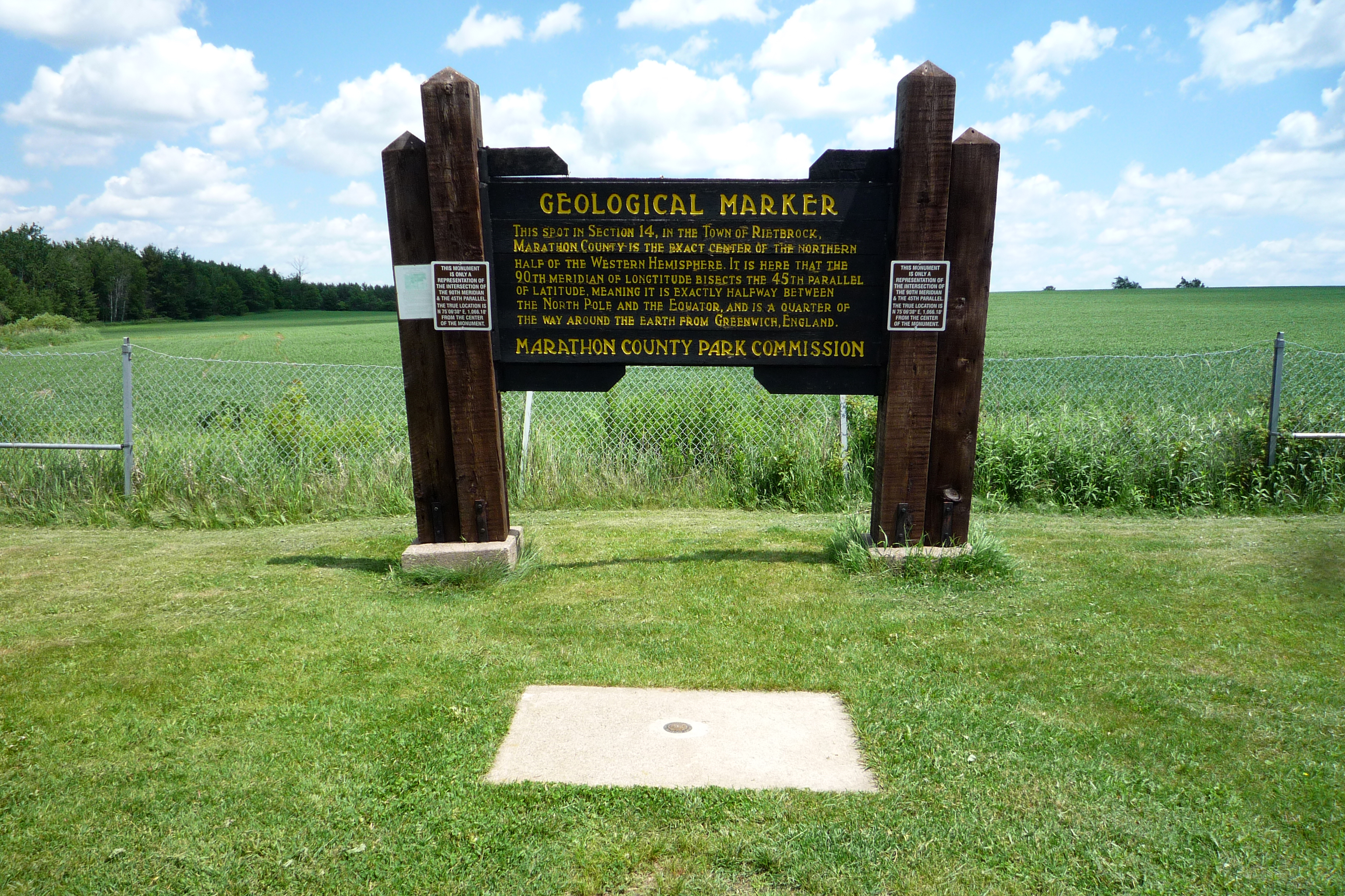
Marker at the 45×90 point near Rietbrock

The Marathon County Park Commission has posted a geographical marker that identifies the spot (45°N, 90°W) of the exact center of the northern half of the Western Hemisphere, meaning that it is a quarter of the way around the world from the Prime Meridian and halfway from the Equator to the North Pole.

=== Major highways ===
- Interstate 39
- US Highway 51
- Wisconsin Highway 13
- Wisconsin Highway 29
- Wisconsin Highway 34
- Wisconsin Highway 49
- Wisconsin Highway 52
- Wisconsin Highway 97
- Wisconsin Highway 98
- Wisconsin Highway 107
- Wisconsin Highway 153

=== Railroads ===
- Canadian National
- Watco

=== Buses ===
- Metro Ride

=== Airports ===
- KAUW – Wausau Downtown Airport
- KCWA – Central Wisconsin Airport

=== Adjacent counties ===
- Lincoln County – north
- Langlade County – northeast
- Shawano County – east
- Waupaca County – southeast
- Portage County – south
- Wood County – south
- Clark County – west
- Taylor County – northwest

=== Natural wildlife refuges ===
- Mead Wildlife Area

== Demographics ==
Historical population
Census	Pop.	Note	%±
1850	508		—
1860	2,892		469.3%
1870	5,885		103.5%
1880	17,121		190.9%
1890	30,369		77.4%
1900	43,256		42.4%
1910	55,054		27.3%
1920	65,259		18.5%
1930	70,629		8.2%
1940	75,915		7.5%
1950	80,337		5.8%
1960	88,874		10.6%
1970	97,457		9.7%
1980	111,270		14.2%
1990	115,400		3.7%
2000	125,834		9.0%
2010	134,063		6.5%
2020	138,013		2.9%
2025 (est.)	139,432	▲	1.0%
U.S. Decennial Census; 1790–1960 1900–1990; 1990–2000 2010 2020

=== Racial and ethnic composition ===
Marathon County, Wisconsin – Racial and ethnic composition Note: the US Census treats Hispanic/Latino as an ethnic category. This table excludes Latinos from the racial categories and assigns them to a separate category. Hispanics/Latinos may be of any race.
Race / ethnicity (NH = Non-Hispanic)	Pop 1980	Pop 1990	Pop 2000	Pop 2010	Pop 2020	% 1980	% 1990	% 2000	% 2010	% 2020
White alone (NH)	110,269	111,927	117,517	121,007	118,783	99.10%	96.99%	93.39%	90.26%	86.07%
Black or African American alone (NH)	35	87	337	820	1,141	0.03%	0.08%	0.27%	0.61%	0.83%
Native American or Alaska Native alone (NH)	327	477	412	566	546	0.29%	0.41%	0.33%	0.42%	0.40%
Asian alone (NH)	184	2,429	5,703	7,107	8,431	0.17%	2.10%	4.53%	5.30%	6.11%
Native Hawaiian or Pacific Islander alone (NH)	x	x	18	25	29	x	x	0.01%	0.02%	0.02%
Other race alone (NH)	174	10	46	65	340	0.16%	0.01%	0.04%	0.05%	0.25%
Mixed race or Multiracial (NH)	x	x	822	1,481	4,290	x	x	0.65%	1.10%	3.11%
Hispanic or Latino (any race)	281	470	979	2,992	4,453	0.25%	0.41%	0.78%	2.23%	3.23%
Total	111,270	115,400	125,834	134,063	138,013	100.00%	100.00%	100.00%	100.00%	100.00%

=== 2020 census ===
As of the 2020 census, the county had a population of 138,013. The population density was 89.3 people per square mile (34.5 people/km^{2}). There were 59,828 housing units at an average density of 38.7 units per square mile (14.9 units/km^{2}).

The median age was 41.1 years, 22.6% of residents were under the age of 18, and 18.5% of residents were 65 years of age or older. For every 100 females there were 101.4 males, and for every 100 females age 18 and over there were 99.9 males age 18 and over.

There were 56,517 households in the county, of which 27.4% had children under the age of 18 living in them. Of all households, 51.4% were married-couple households, 18.8% were households with a male householder and no spouse or partner present, and 21.7% were households with a female householder and no spouse or partner present. About 28.5% of all households were made up of individuals, and 11.6% had someone living alone who was 65 years of age or older.

Of the 59,828 housing units, 5.5% were vacant. Among occupied housing units, 72.1% were owner-occupied and 27.9% were renter-occupied. The homeowner vacancy rate was 1.0% and the rental vacancy rate was 6.3%.

The racial makeup of the county was 86.9% White, 0.9% Black or African American, 0.5% American Indian and Alaska Native, 6.2% Asian, <0.1% Native Hawaiian and Pacific Islander, 1.3% from some other race, and 4.3% from two or more races. Hispanic or Latino residents of any race comprised 3.2% of the population.

56.6% of residents lived in urban areas, while 43.4% lived in rural areas.

2000 Census Age Pyramid for Marathon County

=== 2000 census ===
As of the census of 2000, there were 125,834 people, 47,702 households, and 33,868 families residing in the county. The population density was 81 people per square mile (31 people/km^{2}). There were 50,360 housing units at an average density of 33 units per square mile (13 units/km^{2}). The racial makeup of the county was 93.84% White, 0.28% Black or African American, 0.35% Native American, 4.54% Asian, 0.02% Pacific Islander, 0.26% from other races, and 0.72% from two or more races. 0.78% of the population were Hispanic or Latino of any race. 52.6% were of German and 13.6% Polish ancestry. 92.9% spoke English, 3.4% Hmong, 1.1% German and 1.1% Spanish as their first language.

There were 47,702 households, out of which 34.00% had children under the age of 18 living with them, 59.90% were married couples living together, 7.40% had a female householder with no husband present, and 29.00% were non-families. 23.60% of all households were made up of individuals, and 9.50% had someone living alone who was 65 years of age or older. The average household size was 2.60 and the average family size was 3.11.

In the county, the population was spread out, with 26.80% under the age of 18, 8.20% from 18 to 24, 29.50% from 25 to 44, 22.50% from 45 to 64, and 13.00% who were 65 years of age or older. The median age was 36 years. For every 100 females, there were 99.50 males. For every 100 females aged 18 and over, there were 97.40 males.

== Libraries ==
The Marathon County Public Library (MCPL) is headquartered in downtown Wausau. There are eight branch libraries, in Athens, Edgar, Hatley, Marathon City, Mosinee, Rothschild, Spencer, and Stratford.

== Recreation ==
=== County parks ===
- Amco County Park
- Big Eau Pleine County Park
- Big Rapids County Park
- Bluegill Bay County Park
- Cherokee County Park
- Courthouse Square
- D.C. Everest County Park
- Dells of the Eau Claire County Park
- Duane L. Corbin Shooting Range Park
- Library Park
- Marathon Park
- Mission Lake County Park
- Mountain-Bay State Park Trail
- Reitbrock Geographical Marker
- Rib Falls County Park
- Sunny Vale County Park

=== Snowmobile trails ===
There are over 884 miles of groomed snowmobile trails in Marathon County maintained by 29 area snowmobile clubs.

== Communities ==
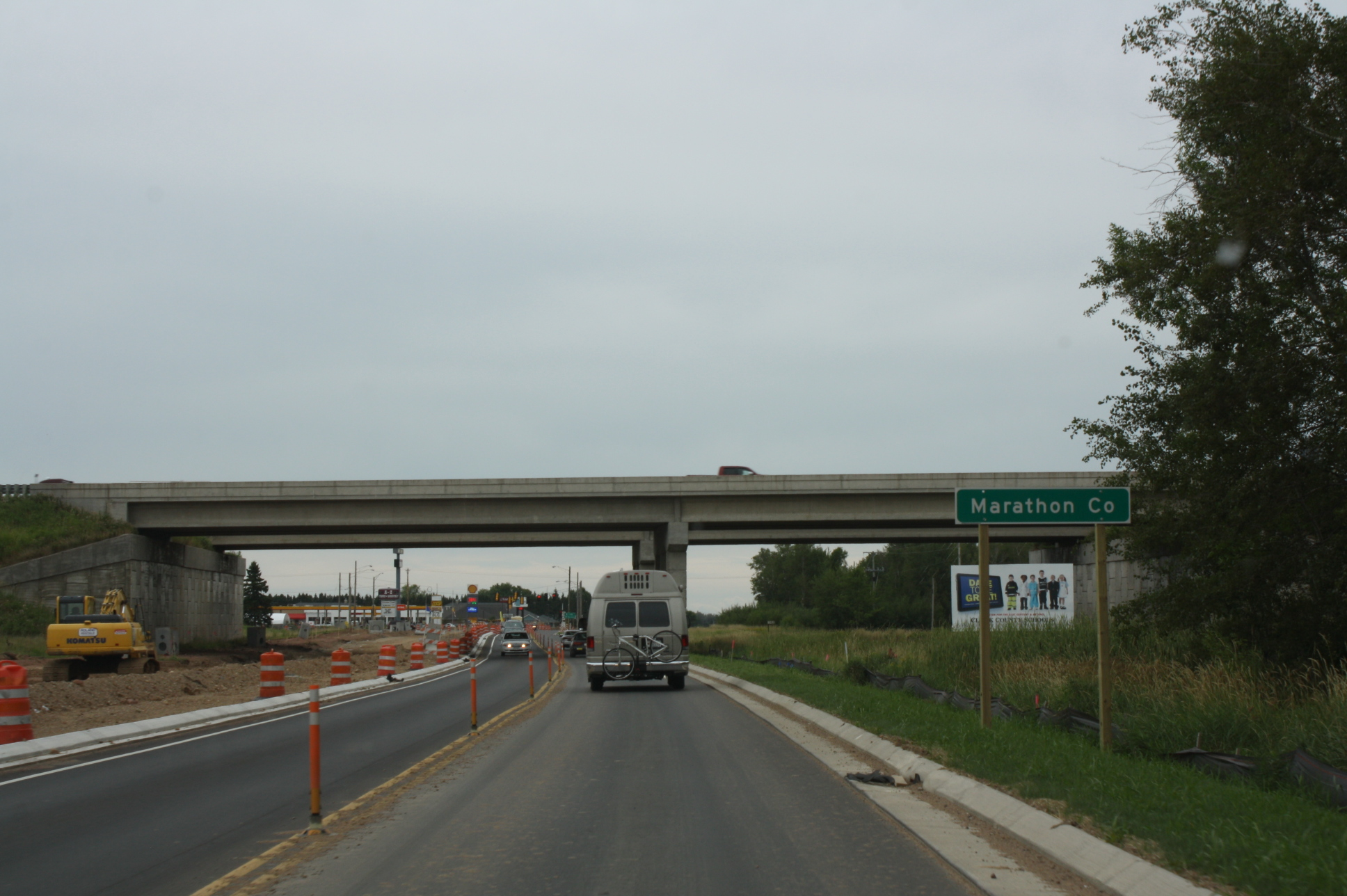
County sign on Wisconsin Highway 13

=== Cities ===
- Abbotsford (mostly in Clark County)
- Colby (mostly in Clark County)
- Marshfield (mostly in Wood County)
- Mosinee
- Schofield
- Wausau (county seat)

=== Villages ===
- Athens
- Birnamwood (mostly in Shawano County)
- Dorchester (mostly in Clark County)
- Edgar
- Elderon
- Fenwood
- Hatley
- Kronenwetter
- Maine
- Marathon City
- Rib Mountain
- Rothschild
- Spencer
- Stratford
- Unity (partly in Clark County)
- Weston

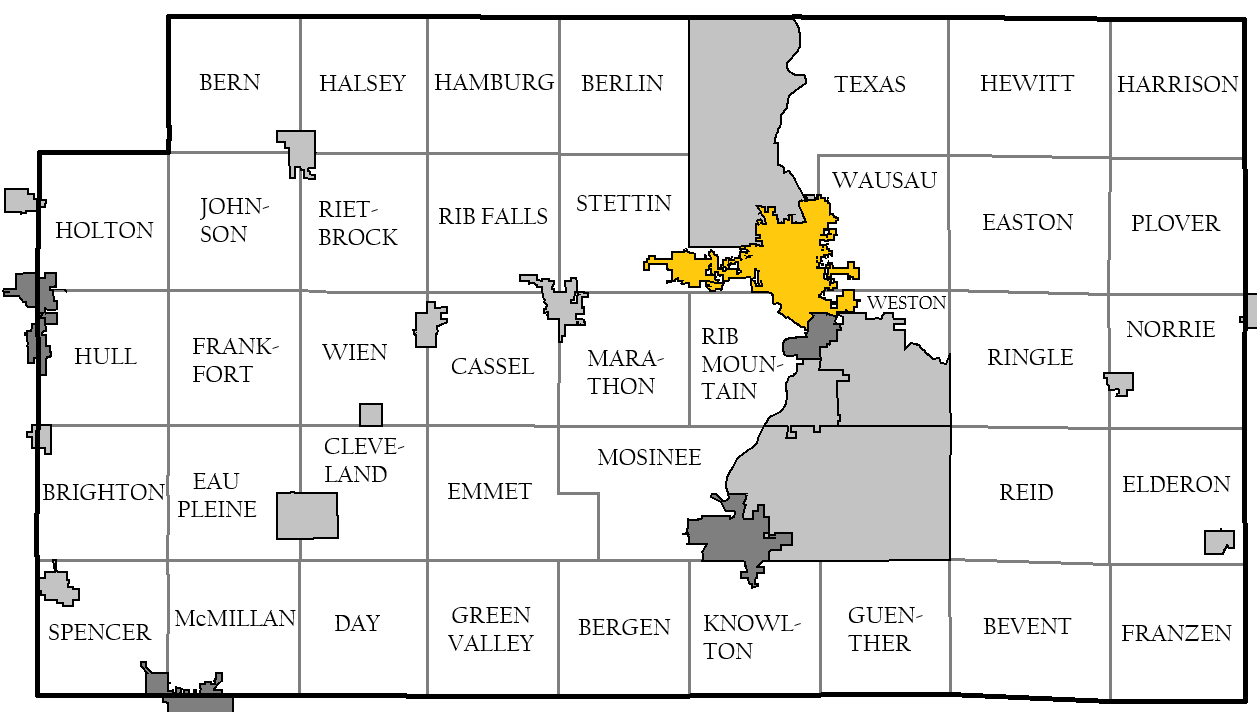
Towns of Marathon County

=== Towns ===
- Bergen
- Berlin
- Bern
- Bevent
- Brighton
- Cassel
- Cleveland
- Day
- Easton
- Eau Pleine
- Elderon
- Emmet
- Frankfort
- Franzen
- Green Valley
- Guenther
- Halsey
- Hamburg
- Harrison
- Hewitt
- Holton
- Hull
- Johnson
- Knowlton
- Marathon
- McMillan
- Mosinee
- Norrie
- Plover
- Reid
- Rib Falls
- Rietbrock
- Ringle
- Spencer
- Stettin
- Texas
- Wausau
- Weston
- Wien

=== Census-designated places ===
- Knowlton
- Rib Mountain

=== Unincorporated communities ===
- Ashley
- Bradley
- Cherokee
- Corinth
- Dancy
- Emmerich
- Evergreen
- Gad (partial)
- Galloway
- Glandon
- Granite Heights
- Halder
- Hamburg
- Hogarty
- Holt
- Johnson
- Kalinke
- Little Chicago
- Little Eau Claire
- Little Rose
- Mann
- March Rapids
- McMillan
- Milan
- Moon
- Mount View
- Naugart
- Norrie
- Nutterville
- Pike Lake
- Poniatowski
- Rangeline
- Rib Falls
- Ringle
- Rocky Corners
- Rozellville
- Schnappsville
- Snell
- Shantytown
- Sunset
- Swan
- Taegesville
- Weber
- Wien
- Wuertsburg

=== Ghost towns/neighborhoods ===
- Callon
- Staadts
- Stettin
- Ziegler

== Government and politics ==
United States presidential election results for Marathon County, Wisconsin
Year	Republican		Democratic		Third party(ies)	
Year	No.	%	No.	%	No.	%
1892	1,959	33.04%	3,791	63.94%	179	3.02%
1896	3,958	49.62%	3,829	48.00%	190	2.38%
1900	4,717	54.32%	3,768	43.40%	198	2.28%
1904	6,144	63.24%	3,225	33.19%	347	3.57%
1908	5,258	50.62%	4,722	45.46%	408	3.93%
1912	3,033	33.20%	4,043	44.26%	2,059	22.54%
1916	5,838	57.03%	3,677	35.92%	722	7.05%
1920	11,356	65.53%	2,133	12.31%	3,840	22.16%
1924	5,577	29.22%	1,109	5.81%	12,402	64.97%
1928	10,127	48.02%	10,675	50.61%	289	1.37%
1932	6,210	25.24%	17,744	72.13%	647	2.63%
1936	7,328	27.06%	17,898	66.10%	1,850	6.83%
1940	15,264	51.80%	13,724	46.57%	481	1.63%
1944	15,782	53.54%	13,192	44.75%	503	1.71%
1948	11,494	40.93%	15,898	56.62%	687	2.45%
1952	20,702	58.52%	14,541	41.11%	130	0.37%
1956	22,586	59.36%	15,301	40.21%	164	0.43%
1960	21,880	54.67%	18,145	45.33%	0	0.00%
1964	12,766	34.11%	24,603	65.74%	57	0.15%
1968	16,907	44.40%	18,063	47.43%	3,111	8.17%
1972	21,454	51.28%	18,500	44.22%	1,885	4.51%
1976	21,898	45.62%	24,934	51.94%	1,169	2.44%
1980	25,868	48.34%	23,281	43.50%	4,365	8.16%
1984	27,080	55.64%	20,128	41.36%	1,462	3.00%
1988	24,482	49.44%	24,658	49.79%	381	0.77%
1992	20,948	36.51%	21,482	37.44%	14,948	26.05%
1996	19,874	38.63%	24,012	46.67%	7,563	14.70%
2000	28,883	49.48%	26,546	45.48%	2,945	5.05%
2004	36,394	53.47%	30,899	45.40%	766	1.13%
2008	30,345	44.66%	36,367	53.53%	1,228	1.81%
2012	36,617	52.41%	32,363	46.32%	882	1.26%
2016	39,014	56.12%	26,481	38.09%	4,023	5.79%
2020	44,624	58.14%	30,808	40.14%	1,319	1.72%
2024	46,213	58.63%	31,529	40.00%	1,084	1.38%

=== Government ===
In the United States Senate, Marathon County is represented by Ron Johnson and Tammy Baldwin. The county is in Wisconsin's 7th congressional district, represented by Tom Tiffany. Marathon County is in Wisconsin's 23rd Senate district and Wisconsin's 29th Senate district districts (mostly the latter), represented by Jesse James and Cory Tomczyk, respectively, and Wisconsin's 69th Assembly district, Wisconsin's 85th Assembly district, Wisconsin's 86th Assembly district, and Wisconsin's 87th Assembly district (mostly the latter three), represented by Karen Hurd, Patrick Snyder, John Spiros, and Brent Jacobson, respectively. The county is in the Wisconsin Court of Appeals's third district and the ninth Wisconsin circuit court (of which it is the seat). At the local level, Marathon County has several elected officials and is governed by a 38-member county board, elected by district.

=== Politics ===
At founding, Marathon was reliably Democratic, attributed to its large population of German Catholic immigrants, who had many grievances against the Republican Party. In 1896, the Democratic Party's adoption of the populist movement infuriated the local anti-free silver Germans, and Marathon broke for the Republican Party for the first time since formation. Deeply progressive, the county saw the Democratic Party's perceived abandonment of progressive values as an offense, and like the state became a Republican stronghold for the next four election cycles. Marathon's semi-urban but largely rural and heavily German Catholic population, which reflected the demographics of the state, led to it eventually becoming one of the most reliable bellwether counties in the state, voting for the candidate that won the state in every election between 1892 and 1996 (with two exceptions: 1928, when the losing candidate was a Catholic, and 1940, when many German Americans turned sharply away from Franklin D. Roosevelt, who was seen as Anglophilic). Starting in 2000, Marathon County began following the trend of many other rural counties, breaking for George W. Bush even as Wisconsin remained a safely blue state and continuing to shift rightward (with the exception of Barack Obama's 2008 landslide). Since 2008, Republicans have gained ground in the county in every election cycle even as the state has flip-flopped between Republicans and Democrats. Marathon County's Republican swing has continued locally as well - it has not voted for a Democrat at the state level since 2006, and Republicans won the mayoralty of Wausau in 2024.

== Education ==
School districts include:

- Abbotsford School District
- Antigo School District
- Athens School District
- Auburndale School District
- Colby School District
- D.C. Everest Area School District
- Edgar School District
- Marathon City School District
- Marshfield School District
- Medford Area School District
- Merrill Area School District
- Mosinee School District
- Rosholt School District
- Spencer School District
- Stratford School District
- Wausau School District
- Wittenberg-Birnamwood School District

== See also ==
- National Register of Historic Places listings in Marathon County, Wisconsin
- Blackberry Hill
