= Veefkind, Wisconsin =

- Unincorporated community
- Location within Wisconsin Location within the United States
- Coordinates: 44°41′30″N 90°22′24″W
- Country: United States
- State: Wisconsin
- County: Clark
- Town: Sherman
- Elevation: 1,283 ft (391 m)
- Time zone: UTC-6 (Central (CST))
  - Summer (DST): UTC-5 (CDT)
- Area codes: 715 & 534
- GNIS feature ID: 1577870

Veefkind is an unincorporated community located in the town of Sherman, Clark County, Wisconsin, United States. Veefkind—of which few traces now remain—was located on the now-abandoned Greenwood branch of the Soo Line. The community was named for Henry B. Veefkind, who owned a general store and had convinced the Wisconsin Central Railroad to build a line through the area.
