= Wisconsin Highway 99 =

State highway in Wisconsin, United States

State Trunk Highway 99

Route information
- Length: 8.3 mi (13.4 km)
- Existed: 1919–1999

Major junctions
- West end: WIS 67 southwest of Eagle
- East end: WIS 83 in Mukwonago

Location
- Country: United States
- State: Wisconsin
- Counties: Waukesha

Highway system
- Wisconsin State Trunk Highway System; Interstate; US; State; Scenic; Rustic
← WIS 98	→ WIS 100

State Trunk Highway 99 (often called Highway 99, STH-99 or WIS 99) was a state highway in the U.S. state of Wisconsin. It ran east–west between Eagle and Mukwonago. The road was turned over to Waukesha County maintenance in 1999, and is now County Trunk Highway LO (CTH-LO). The designation was chosen to honor Lloyd Owens, long-time Waukesha County Board Chairman.

== Route description ==
Starting at an intersection with WIS 67 in the Town of Eagle, WIS 99 ran due east through an area of mixed agricultural land and residential subdivisions. East of the intersection with Markham Road, the highway turned northward for about 1,000 feet (300 m) before returning to its eastward course on the north side of Eagle Spring Lake. Running north of the Rainbow Springs Golf Resort, the highway continued into the community of Mukwonago. There it terminated at the intersection with WIS 83 in town.

== History ==
WIS 99 was first designated in 1919 between WIS 26 at Milton and running through Eagle to a terminus at WIS 83 in Mukwonago; the highway was truncated by 1924, removing the segment between Milton and Eagle. The entire highway was moved to a different alignment south of the original highway in 1967. The former routing is now CTH-NN between the two towns. WIS 99 was decommissioned in 1999 and replaced with CTH-LO. The name was chosen to honor Lloyd Owens, former chairman of the Waukesha County Board at a time when the position was the most power in the county.

== Major intersections ==
The entire route was in Waukesha County.

Location	mi	km	Destinations	Notes
Town of Eagle	0.0	0.0	WIS 67	
Town of Eagle	3.2	5.1	CTH-E	
Town of Mukwonago	6.7	10.8	CTH-I	
Mukwonago	8.3	13.4	WIS 83	
1.000 mi = 1.609 km; 1.000 km = 0.621 mi
