= Guenther, Wisconsin =

- Town
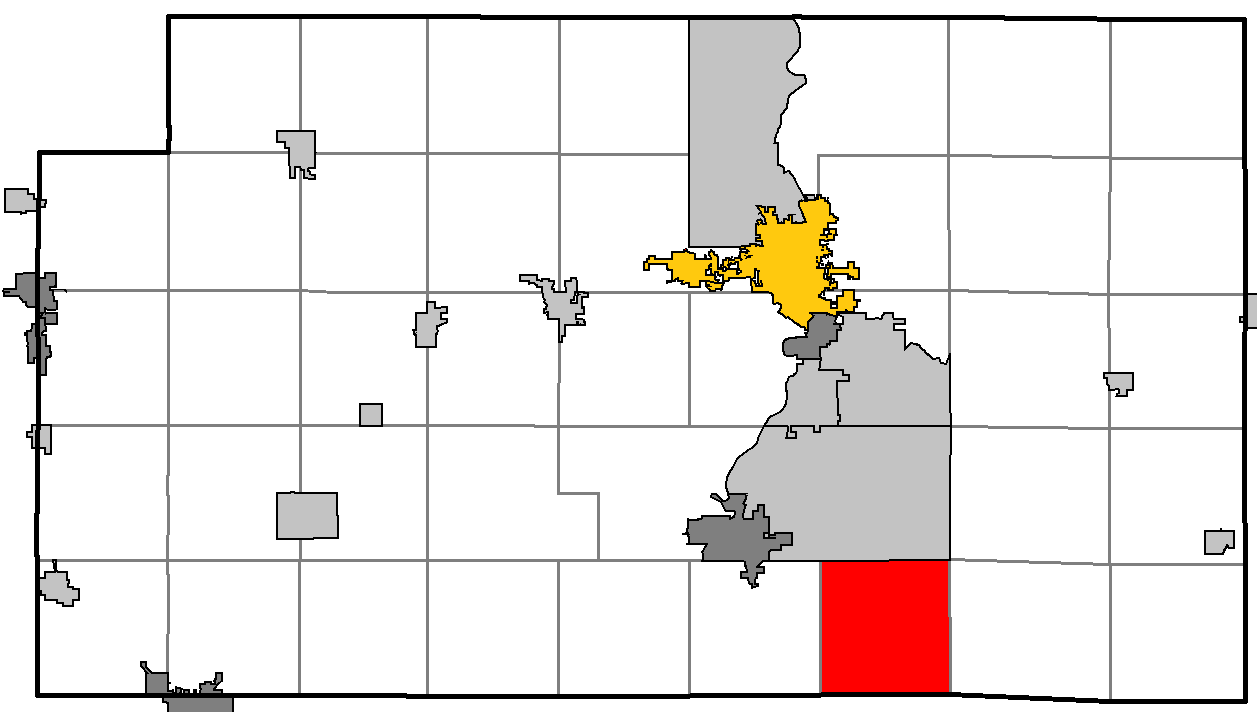
- Location of Guenther, Marathon County

- Location of Marathon County, Wisconsin
- Coordinates: 44°43′39″N 89°33′25″W
- Country: United States
- State: Wisconsin
- County: Marathon

Area
  - Total: 34.7 sq mi (89.9 km^{2})
  - Land: 34.7 sq mi (89.8 km^{2})
  - Water: 0.039 sq mi (0.1 km^{2})
- Elevation: 1,165 ft (355 m)

Population (2020)
  - Total: 358
  - Density: 10.3/sq mi (3.99/km^{2})
- Time zone: UTC-6 (Central (CST))
  - Summer (DST): UTC-5 (CDT)
- Area codes: 715 & 534
- FIPS code: 55-31800
- GNIS feature ID: 1583330
- Website: https://www.townofguenther.com/

Guenther is a town in Marathon County, Wisconsin, United States. It is part of the Wausau, Wisconsin Metropolitan Statistical Area. The population was 358 at the 2020 census. The unincorporated communities of Ashley and Rocky Corners are located partially in the town.

== Geography ==
According to the United States Census Bureau, the town has a total area of 34.7 square miles (89.9 km^{2}), of which 34.7 square miles (89.8 km^{2}) is land and 0.04 square miles (0.1 km^{2}), or 0.12%, is water.

== Demographics ==
At the 2000 census there were 302 people, 114 households, and 82 families living in the town. The population density was 8.8 people per square mile (3.4/km^{2}). There were 130 housing units at an average density of 3.8 per square mile (1.5/km^{2}). The racial makeup of the town was 99.01% White, 0.33% African American and 0.66% Native American. Hispanic or Latino of any race were 0.33%.

Of the 114 households 30.7% had children under the age of 18 living with them, 62.3% were married couples living together, 4.4% had a female householder with no husband present, and 27.2% were non-families. 17.5% of households were one person and 5.3% were one person aged 65 or older. The average household size was 2.65 and the average family size was 3.13.

The age distribution was 23.8% under the age of 18, 4.6% from 18 to 24, 35.1% from 25 to 44, 23.5% from 45 to 64, and 12.9% 65 or older. The median age was 38 years. For every 100 females, there were 125.4 males. For every 100 females age 18 and over, there were 134.7 males.

The median household income was $43,250 and the median family income was $48,750. Males had a median income of $31,667 versus $25,625 for females. The per capita income for the town was $18,475. About 2.6% of families and 5.5% of the population were below the poverty line, including none of those under the age of eighteen and 16.7% of those sixty five or over.
