= Bradley, Marathon County, Wisconsin =

Unincorporated community in Wisconsin, United States

Bradley, Wisconsin
- Unincorporated community
- Location within Wisconsin Location within the United States
- Coordinates: 44°48′04″N 90°00′53″W
- Country: United States
- State: Wisconsin
- County: Marathon
- Elevation: 1,217 ft (371 m)
- Time zone: UTC-6 (Central (CST))
  - Summer (DST): UTC-5 (CDT)
- Area codes: 715 & 534
- GNIS feature ID: 1562126

Bradley is an unincorporated community located in the town of Cleveland, Marathon County, Wisconsin, United States. Bradley is located at the junction of Wisconsin Highway 153 and County Highway M, 3 miles (4.8 km) east of Stratford.
