= Cleveland, Marathon County, Wisconsin =

Cleveland, Wisconsin
- Town
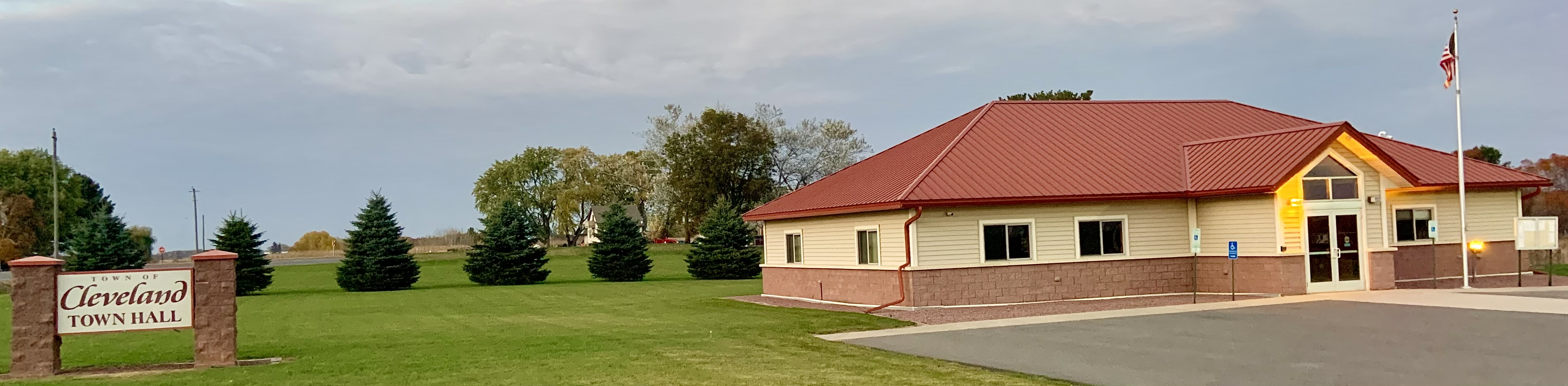
- Town hall

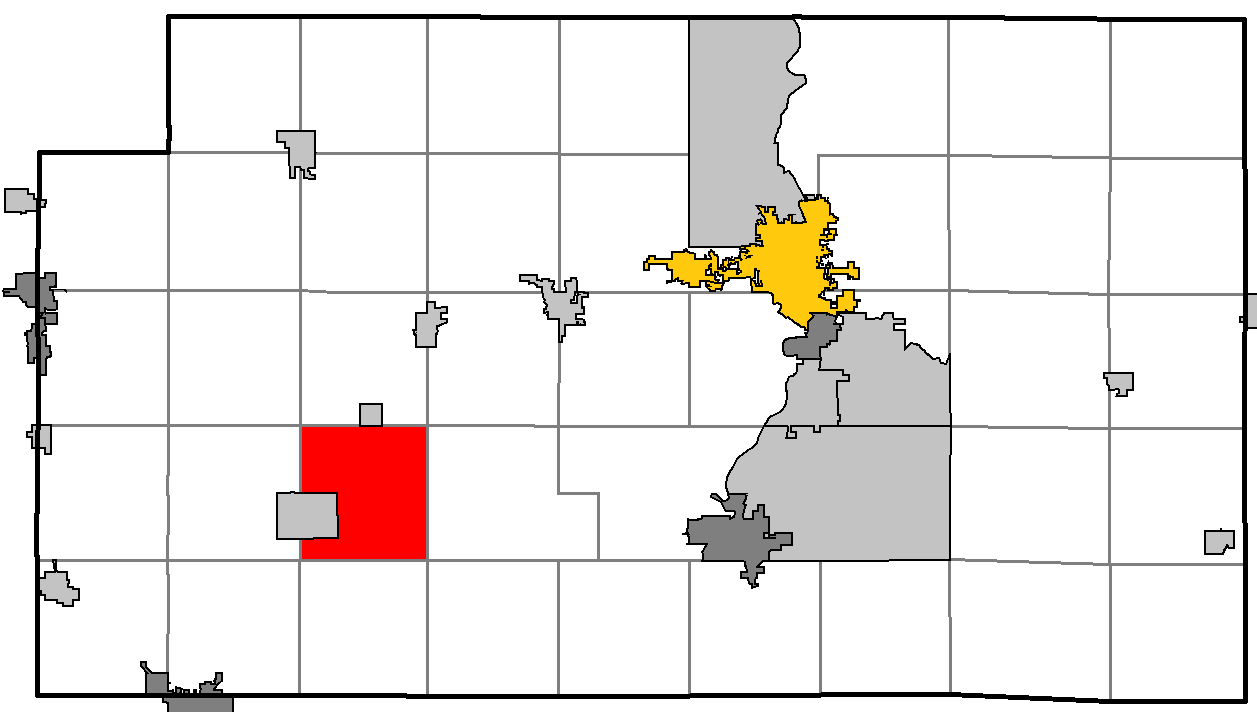
- Location of Cleveland, Marathon County

- Location of Marathon County, Wisconsin
- Coordinates: 44°48′56″N 90°0′18″W
- Country: United States
- State: Wisconsin
- County: Marathon

Area
  - Total: 30.5 sq mi (79.1 km^{2})
  - Land: 29.7 sq mi (76.8 km^{2})
  - Water: 0.85 sq mi (2.2 km^{2})
- Elevation: 1,188 ft (362 m)

Population (2020)
  - Total: 1,486
  - Density: 50.1/sq mi (19.3/km^{2})
- Time zone: UTC-6 (Central (CST))
  - Summer (DST): UTC-5 (CDT)
- Area codes: 715 & 534
- FIPS code: 55-15425
- GNIS feature ID: 1582977
- Website: www.townofclevelandwi.com

Cleveland is a town in Marathon County, Wisconsin, United States. It is part of the Wausau, Wisconsin Metropolitan Statistical Area. The population was 1,486 at the 2020 census. The unincorporated community of Bradley is located in the town.

== Geography ==
According to the United States Census Bureau, the town has a total area of 30.5 square miles (79.0 km^{2}), of which 29.7 square miles (76.8 km^{2}) is land and 0.9 square mile (2.2 km^{2}) (2.82%) is water.

== Demographics ==
At the 2000 census there were 1,160 people, 396 households and 335 families living in the town. The population density was 39.1 per square mile (15.1/km^{2}). There were 422 housing units at an average density of 14.2 per square mile (5.5/km^{2}). The racial make-up of the town was 99.48% White, 0.09% Asian, 0.26% from other races, and 0.17% from two or more races. Hispanic or Latino of any race were 0.69%.

Of the 396 households, 39.9% had children under the age of 18 living with them, 73.2% were married couples living together, 6.1% had a female householder with no husband present, and 15.4% were non-families. 10.4% of households were one person and 3.8% were one person aged 65 or older. The average household size was 2.93 and the average family size was 3.12.

27.6% of the population were under the age of 18, 8.6% from 18 to 24, 30.9% from 25 to 44, 23.0% from 45 to 64, and 9.9% 65 or older. The median age was 35. For every 100 females, there were 107.5 males. For every 100 females age 18 and over, there were 109.0 males.

The median household income was $49,167 and the median family income was $52,961. Males had a median income of $28,917 and females $21,522. The per capita income was $19,293. About 4.6% of families and 4.9% of the population were below the poverty line, including 4.4% of those under age 18 and 7.6% of those age 65 or over.
