= Johnson, Wisconsin =

Town in Marathon County, Wisconsin, U.S.

Town of Johnson
- Town
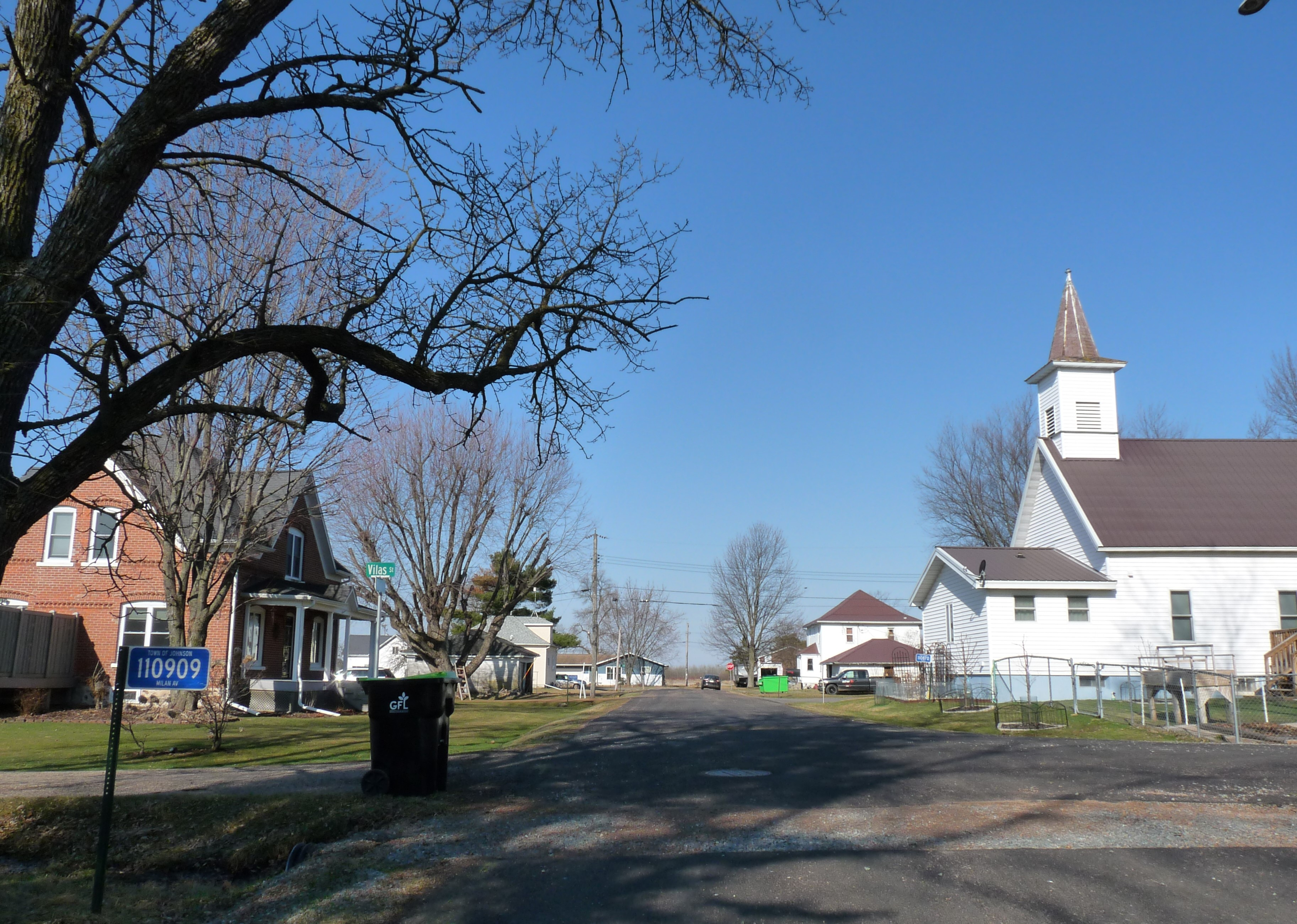
- Milan, facing west on Milan Avenue

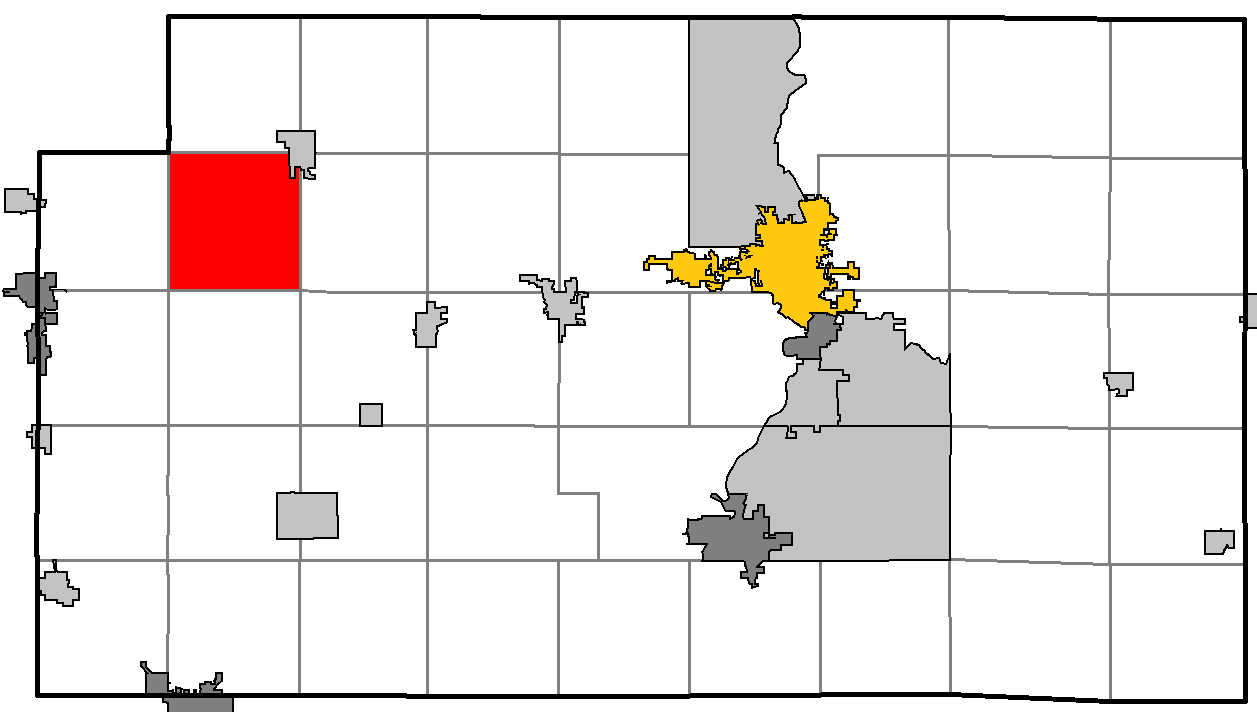
- Location of the Town of Johnson, Marathon County

- Location of Marathon County, Wisconsin
- Coordinates: 44°58′35″N 90°9′0″W
- Country: United States
- State: Wisconsin
- County: Marathon

Area
  - Total: 35.0 sq mi (90.6 km^{2})
  - Land: 35.0 sq mi (90.6 km^{2})
  - Water: 0 sq mi (0.0 km^{2})
- Elevation: 1,434 ft (437 m)

Population (2020)
  - Total: 873
  - Density: 25.0/sq mi (9.64/km^{2})
- Time zone: UTC-6 (Central (CST))
  - Summer (DST): UTC-5 (CDT)
- Area codes: 715 & 534
- FIPS code: 55-38300
- GNIS feature ID: 1583455
- Website: https://www.townofjohnson.org/

The Town of Johnson is located in Marathon County, Wisconsin, United States. It is part of the Wausau, Wisconsin Metropolitan Statistical Area. The population was 873 at the 2020 census. The unincorporated communities of Corinth, Milan, and Wuertsburg are located in the town.

== Geography ==
According to the United States Census Bureau, the town has a total area of 35.0 square miles (90.6 km^{2}), all land.

== Demographics ==
At the 2000 census there were 993 people, 299 households, and 246 families living in the town. The population density was 28.4 people per square mile (11.0/km^{2}). There were 313 housing units at an average density of 8.9 per square mile (3.5/km^{2}). The racial makeup of the town was 99.50% White, 0.10% African American, and 0.40% from two or more races. Hispanic or Latino of any race were 0.40%.

Of the 299 households 44.8% had children under the age of 18 living with them, 72.6% were married couples living together, 2.7% had a female householder with no husband present, and 17.7% were non-families. 15.7% of households were one person and 8.4% were one person aged 65 or older. The average household size was 3.32 and the average family size was 3.69.

The age distribution was 35.9% under the age of 18, 7.2% from 18 to 24, 27.6% from 25 to 44, 20.0% from 45 to 64, and 9.4% 65 or older. The median age was 30 years. For every 100 females, there were 99.8 males. For every 100 females age 18 and over, there were 100.3 males.

The median household income was $40,156 and the median family income was $42,031. Males had a median income of $28,793 versus $22,031 for females. The per capita income for the town was $12,897. About 9.1% of families and 13.8% of the population were below the poverty line, including 18.4% of those under age 18 and 12.8% of those age 65 or over.
