= Callon, Wisconsin =

Neighborhood of village in Wisconsin, US

Coordinates: 44°53′52″N 89°30′17″W

Callon is a neighborhood of the Village of Weston, Marathon County, in the United States. It was an unincorporated community until Weston's incorporation as a village.

== History ==
Callon was named for Patrick Callon, a local landowner.
