= Frankfort, Marathon County, Wisconsin =

Town of Frankfort, Wisconsin
- Town
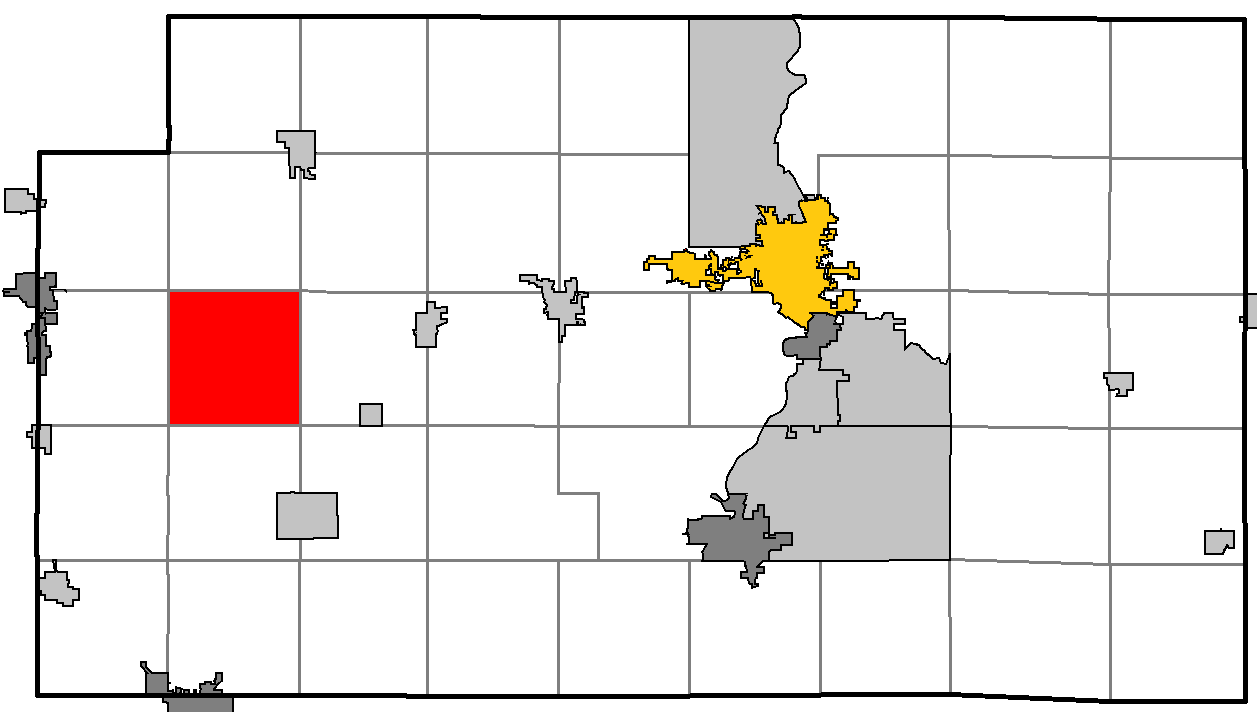
- Location of Frankfort, Marathon County

- Location of Marathon County, Wisconsin
- Coordinates: 44°53′54″N 90°8′3″W
- Country: United States
- State: Wisconsin
- County: Marathon

Area
  - Total: 35.1 sq mi (90.8 km^{2})
  - Land: 35.1 sq mi (90.8 km^{2})
  - Water: 0 sq mi (0.0 km^{2})
- Elevation: 1,322 ft (403 m)

Population (2020)
  - Total: 635
  - Density: 18.1/sq mi (6.99/km^{2})
- Time zone: UTC-6 (Central (CST))
  - Summer (DST): UTC-5 (CDT)
- Area codes: 715 & 534
- FIPS code: 55-27150
- GNIS feature ID: 1583229
- Website: https://www.frankfort-marathon.com/

Frankfort is a town in Marathon County, Wisconsin, United States. It is part of the Wausau, Wisconsin Metropolitan Statistical Area. It is part of the Wausau, Wisconsin Metropolitan Statistical Area. The population was 635 at the 2020 census. The unincorporated community of Swan is located in the town.

== Geography ==
According to the United States Census Bureau, the town has a total area of 35.1 square miles (90.8 km^{2}), all land.

== Demographics ==
At the 2000 census there were 651 people, 213 households, and 174 families living in the town. The population density was 18.5 people per square mile (7.1/km^{2}). There were 222 housing units at an average density of 6.3 per square mile (2.4/km^{2}). The racial makeup of the town was 99.23% White, 0.61% Asian, and 0.15% from two or more races. Hispanic or Latino of any race were 0.15%.

Of the 213 households 39.4% had children under the age of 18 living with them, 75.6% were married couples living together, 3.3% had a female householder with no husband present, and 18.3% were non-families. 14.1% of households were one person and 4.2% were one person aged 65 or older. The average household size was 3.06 and the average family size was 3.42.

The age distribution was 29.6% under the age of 18, 8.0% from 18 to 24, 28.7% from 25 to 44, 23.3% from 45 to 64, and 10.3% 65 or older. The median age was 36 years. For every 100 females, there were 119.2 males. For every 100 females age 18 and over, there were 119.1 males.

The median household income was $41,071 and the median family income was $47,386. Males had a median income of $22,273 versus $16,354 for females. The per capita income for the town was $15,946. About 7.1% of families and 9.7% of the population were below the poverty line, including 13.8% of those under age 18 and 11.8% of those age 65 or over.
