= Wien, Wisconsin =

- Town
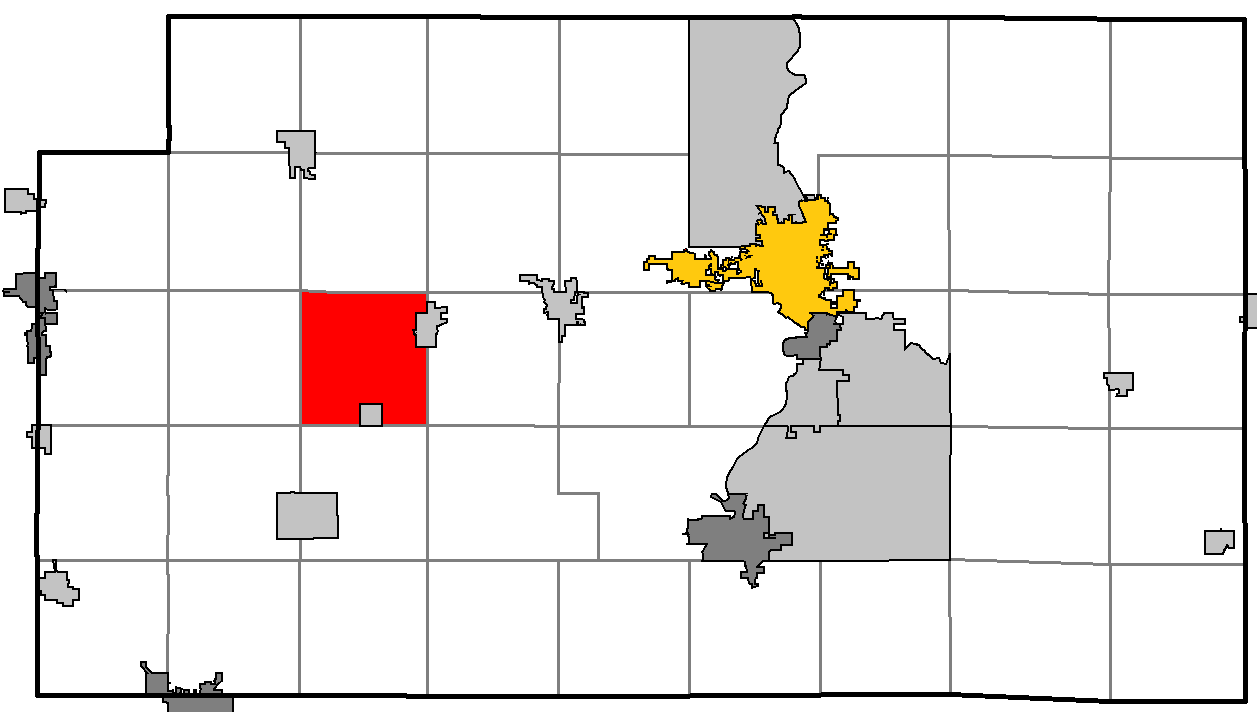
- Location of Wien, Marathon County

- Location of Marathon County, Wisconsin
- Coordinates: 44°54′2″N 90°1′43″W
- Country: United States
- State: Wisconsin
- County: Marathon

Area
  - Total: 31.6 sq mi (81.8 km^{2})
  - Land: 31.5 sq mi (81.7 km^{2})
  - Water: 0 sq mi (0.0 km^{2})
- Elevation: 1,309 ft (399 m)

Population (2020)
  - Total: 885
  - Density: 28.1/sq mi (10.8/km^{2})
- Time zone: UTC-6 (Central (CST))
  - Summer (DST): UTC-5 (CDT)
- Area codes: 715 & 534
- FIPS code: 55-87025
- GNIS feature ID: 1584435
- Website: https://townofwien.com/

Wien is a town in Marathon County, Wisconsin, United States. It is part of the Wausau, Wisconsin Metropolitan Statistical Area. The population was 885 at the 2020 census. The unincorporated community of Wien is located in the town.

== Geography ==
According to the United States Census Bureau, the town has a total area of 31.6 square miles (81.7 km^{2}), of which 31.6 square miles (81.7 km^{2}) is land and 0.03% is water.

== Demographics ==
At the 2000 census there were 712 people, 248 households, and 200 families living in the town. The population density was 22.6 people per square mile (8.7/km^{2}). There were 260 housing units at an average density of 8.2 per square mile (3.2/km^{2}). The racial makeup of the town was 98.60% White, 0.56% Asian, 0.28% from other races, and 0.56% from two or more races. Hispanic or Latino of any race were 0.14%.

Of the 248 households 34.3% had children under the age of 18 living with them, 71.8% were married couples living together, 4.8% had a female householder with no husband present, and 19.0% were non-families. 16.1% of households were one person and 5.2% were one person aged 65 or older. The average household size was 2.87 and the average family size was 3.21.

The age distribution was 26.5% under the age of 18, 8.3% from 18 to 24, 28.9% from 25 to 44, 23.0% from 45 to 64, and 13.2% 65 or older. The median age was 37 years. For every 100 females, there were 111.9 males. For every 100 females age 18 and over, there were 111.7 males.

The median household income was $45,556 and the median family income was $52,969. Males had a median income of $30,913 versus $22,788 for females. The per capita income for the town was $18,046. About 6.6% of families and 10.1% of the population were below the poverty line, including 20.1% of those under age 18 and 4.1% of those age 65 or over.
