= Marathon City, Wisconsin =

- Village
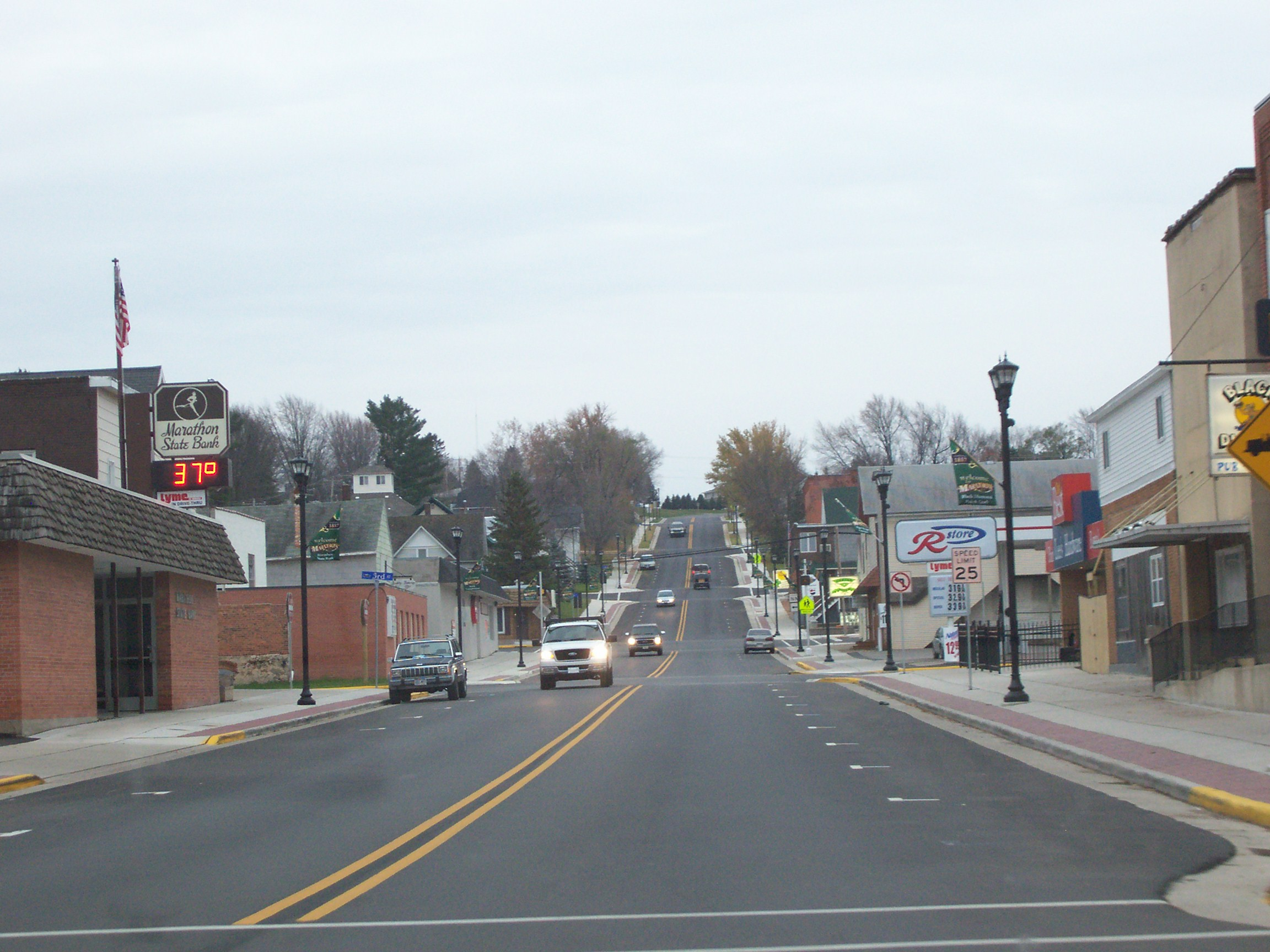
- Downtown Marathon City on Wisconsin Highway 107
- Nickname: The Village on the Hill
- Location of Marathon City in Marathon County, Wisconsin.
- Coordinates: 44°55′48″N 89°50′22″W
- Country: United States
- State: Wisconsin
- County: Marathon

Area
  - Total: 3.17 sq mi (8.21 km^{2})
  - Land: 3.15 sq mi (8.16 km^{2})
  - Water: 0.015 sq mi (0.04 km^{2})
- Elevation: 1,286 ft (392 m)

Population (2020)
  - Total: 1,576
  - Density: 500/sq mi (193/km^{2})
- Time zone: UTC-6 (Central (CST))
  - Summer (DST): UTC-5 (CDT)
- Area codes: 715 & 534
- FIPS code: 55-49100
- GNIS feature ID: 1569014
- Website: www.marathoncitywi.gov

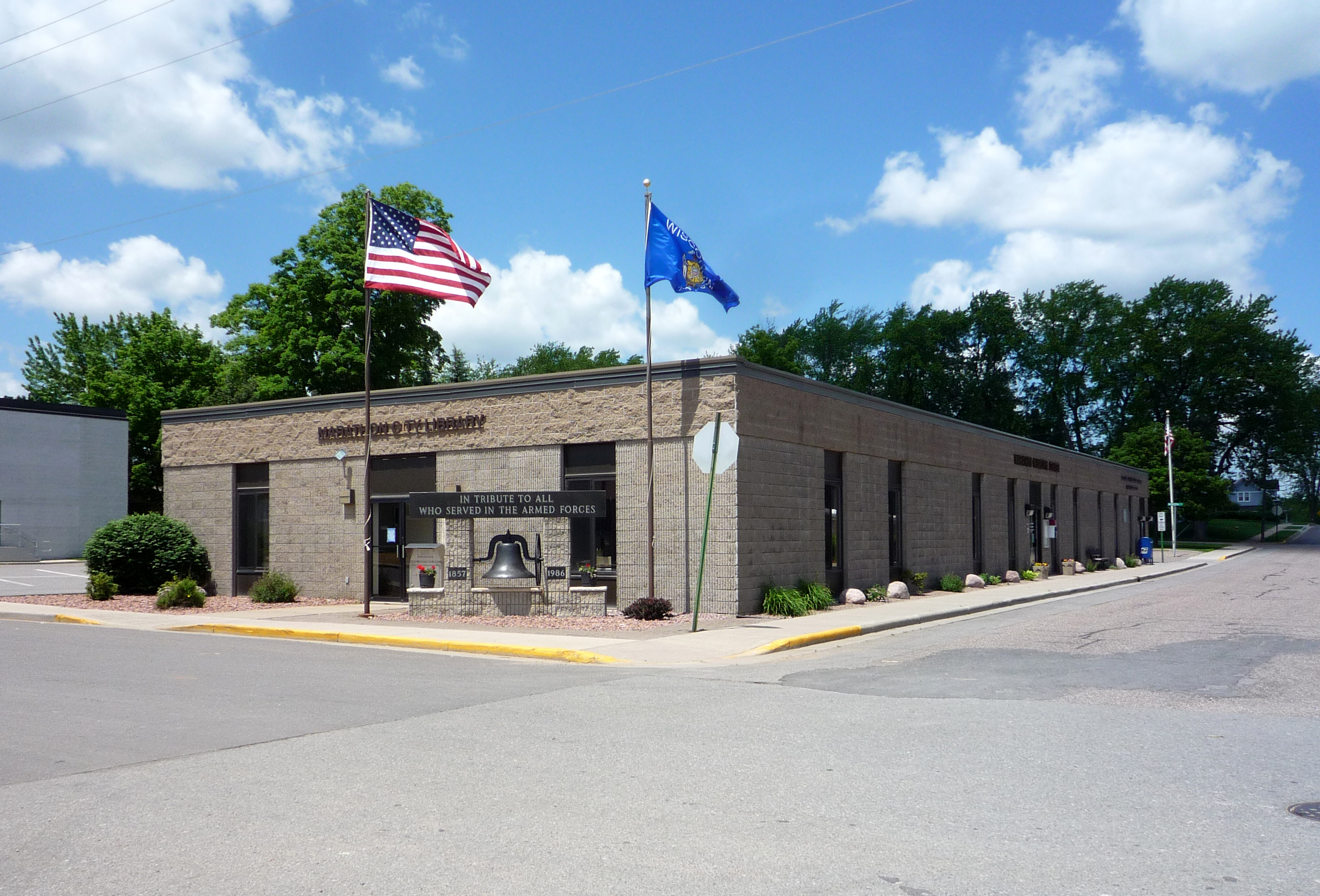
Marathon City Hall

Marathon City is a village in Marathon County, Wisconsin, United States. It is part of the Wausau, Wisconsin, Metropolitan Statistical Area. The population was 1,576 at the 2020 census. The village was incorporated from a part of the original area of the town of Marathon. The village dates back to 1856. The name of the village commemorates the Battle of Marathon.

== Geography ==
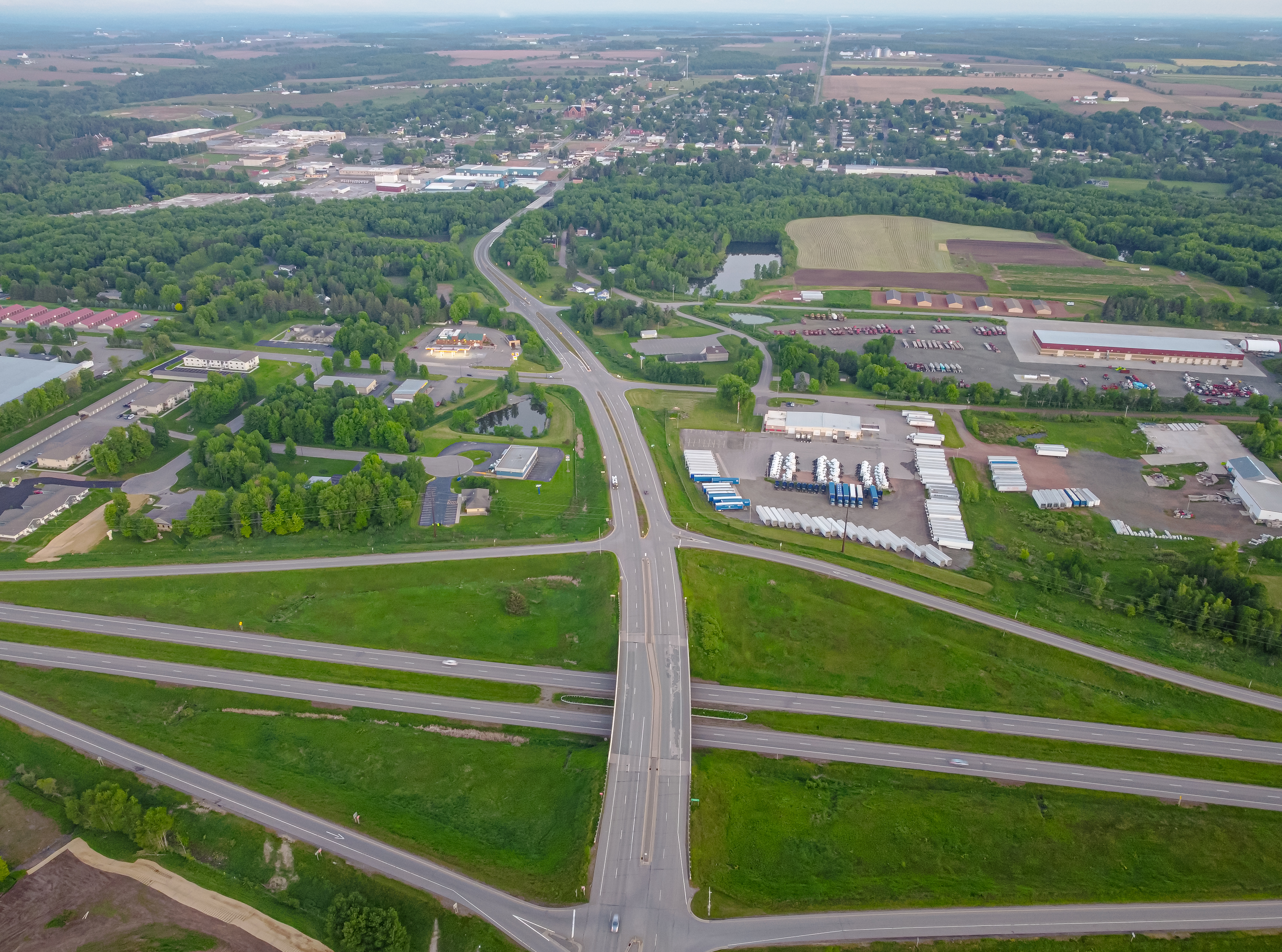
Wis-29 and Wis-107 junction on the north end of the city

Marathon City is located at 44°55′48″N 89°50′22″W (44.929882, -89.839524).

According to the United States Census Bureau, the village has a total area of 2.42 square miles (6.27 km^{2}), of which 2.41 square miles (6.24 km^{2}) is land and 0.01 square miles (0.03 km^{2}) is water.

== Demographics ==
Historical population
Census	Pop.	Note	%±
1890	258		—
1900	528		104.7%
1910	656		24.2%
1920	670		2.1%
1930	808		20.6%
1940	823		1.9%
1950	853		3.6%
1960	1,022		19.8%
1970	1,214		18.8%
1980	1,552		27.8%
1990	1,606		3.5%
2000	1,640		2.1%
2010	1,524		−7.1%
2020	1,576		3.4%
U.S. Decennial Census

=== 2010 census ===
As of the census of 2010, there were 1,524 people, 638 households, and 447 families living in the village. The population density was 632.4 inhabitants per square mile (244.2/km^{2}). There were 680 housing units at an average density of 282.2 per square mile (109.0/km^{2}). The racial makeup of the village was 96.9% White, 0.1% African American, 0.1% Native American, 1.3% Asian, 1.2% from other races, and 0.4% from two or more races. Hispanic or Latino of any race were 1.8% of the population.

There were 638 households, of which 31.0% had children under the age of 18 living with them, 56.0% were married couples living together, 9.1% had a female householder with no husband present, 5.0% had a male householder with no wife present, and 29.9% were non-families. 27.1% of all households were made up of individuals, and 14.7% had someone living alone who was 65 years of age or older. The average household size was 2.39 and the average family size was 2.84.

The median age in the village was 43.2 years. 23.2% of residents were under the age of 18; 5.9% were between the ages of 18 and 24; 23.5% were from 25 to 44; 29.5% were from 45 to 64; and 17.8% were 65 years of age or older. The gender makeup of the village was 47.9% male and 52.1% female.

=== 2000 census ===
As of the census of 2000, there were 1,640 people, 632 households, and 448 families living in the village. The population density was 805.5 people per square mile (310.4/km^{2}). There were 659 housing units at an average density of 323.7 per square mile (124.7/km^{2}). The racial makeup of the village was 98.54% White, 1.16% Asian, 0.06% from other races, and 0.24% from two or more races. Hispanic or Latino of any race were 0.30% of the population.

There were 632 households, out of which 35.8% had children under the age of 18 living with them, 61.9% were married couples living together, 6.6% had a female householder with no husband present, and 29.1% were non-families. 25.2% of all households were made up of individuals, and 9.8% had someone living alone who was 65 years of age or older. The average household size was 2.58 and the average family size was 3.14.

In the village, the population was spread out, with 26.5% under the age of 18, 8.0% from 18 to 24, 30.2% from 25 to 44, 21.9% from 45 to 64, and 13.4% who were 65 years of age or older. The median age was 36 years. For every 100 females, there were 92.5 males. For every 100 females age 18 and over, there were 93.9 males.

The median income for a household in the village was $44,063, and the median income for a family was $53,036. Males had a median income of $34,180 versus $24,191 for females. The per capita income for the village was $20,480. About 1.1% of families and 2.0% of the population were below the poverty line, including 0.2% of those under age 18 and 7.7% of those age 65 or over.

== Marathon City Branch Library ==
Prior to the 1950s a lending library was maintained at Friendship House. Friendship House, operated by a religious order, was located just to the east of the village. The Marathon City Library began in 1954 in a space at the Marathon High School. In 1973, the Marathon City Library became a Branch of the Marathon County Public Library when the Wausau Public Library and Marathon County Library merged.

By 1975, the library was relocated to the village hall, and later moved to a storefront location on Main Street. Construction of a new village hall in 1985 included the branch library, where it resided until 2010.

In late 2009, after it was decided more space was needed, a referendum allowed the village to construct a separate library building on Washington Street, which was completed in September 2010.
