= Sherman, Clark County, Wisconsin =

Sherman, Wisconsin
- Town
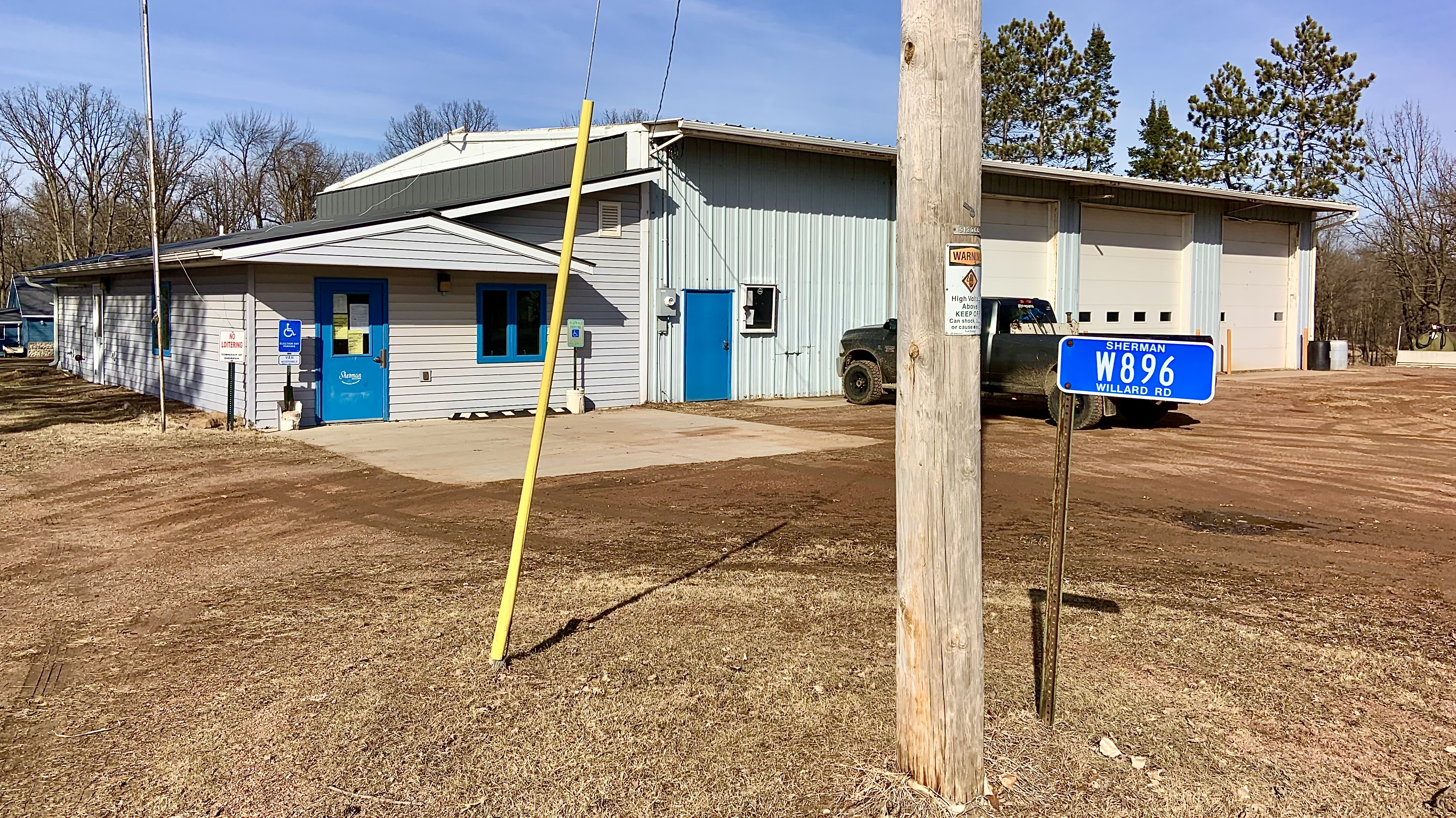
- Town hall

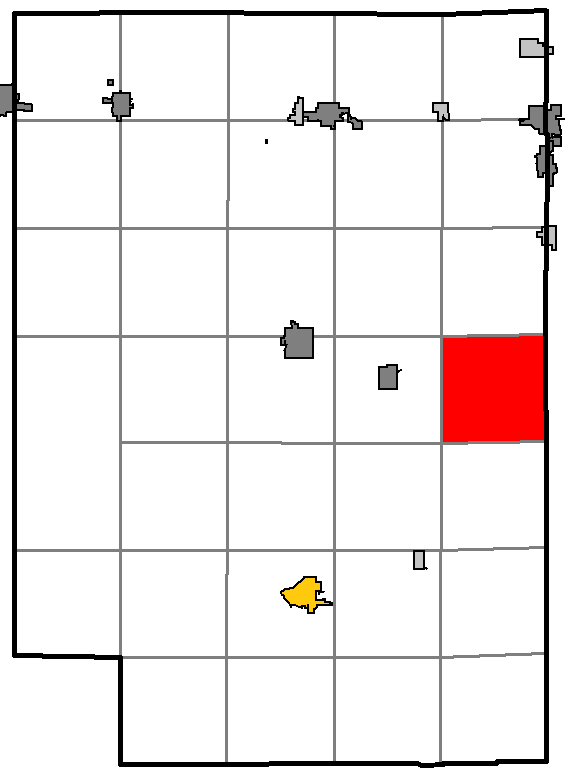
- Location of Sherman, Clark County

- Location of Clark County, Wisconsin
- Coordinates: 44°43′55″N 90°22′1″W
- Country: United States
- State: Wisconsin
- County: Clark

Area
  - Total: 35.0 sq mi (90.6 km^{2})
  - Land: 35.0 sq mi (90.6 km^{2})
  - Water: 0 sq mi (0.0 km^{2})
- Elevation: 1,273 ft (388 m)

Population (2020)
  - Total: 831
  - Density: 23.8/sq mi (9.17/km^{2})
- Time zone: UTC-6 (Central (CST))
  - Summer (DST): UTC-5 (CDT)
- Area codes: 715 & 534
- FIPS code: 55-73350
- GNIS feature ID: 1584145

Sherman is a town in Clark County, Wisconsin, United States. The population was 831 at the 2020 census. The unincorporated community of Veefkind is located in the town. The unincorporated community of Spokeville is also located partially in the town.

== Geography ==
According to the United States Census Bureau, the town has a total area of 35.0 square miles (90.6 km^{2}), all land.

== Demographics ==
As of the census of 2000, there were 831 people, 247 households, and 205 families residing in the town. The population density was 23.8 people per square mile (9.2/km^{2}). There were 263 housing units at an average density of 7.5 per square mile (2.9/km^{2}). The racial makeup of the town was 97.95% White, 0.12% African American, 0.72% from other races, and 1.20% from two or more races. Hispanic or Latino of any race were 2.65% of the population.

There were 247 households, out of which 49.4% had children under the age of 18 living with them, 77.3% were married couples living together, 2.4% had a female householder with no husband present, and 16.6% were non-families. 13.4% of all households were made up of individuals, and 4.0% had someone living alone who was 65 years of age or older. The average household size was 3.36 and the average family size was 3.74.

In the town, the population was spread out, with 36.7% under the age of 18, 6.6% from 18 to 24, 31.3% from 25 to 44, 18.9% from 45 to 64, and 6.5% who were 65 years of age or older. The median age was 30 years. For every 100 females, there were 103.7 males. For every 100 females age 18 and over, there were 103.9 males.

The median income for a household in the town was $42,344, and the median income for a family was $45,625. Males had a median income of $28,281 versus $22,200 for females. The per capita income for the town was $14,332. About 12.3% of families and 18.8% of the population were below the poverty line, including 27.0% of those under age 18 and 14.5% of those age 65 or over.

== See also ==
- List of towns in Wisconsin
