= Reid, Wisconsin =

Town in Marathon County, Wisconsin, United States

Town of Reid
- Town
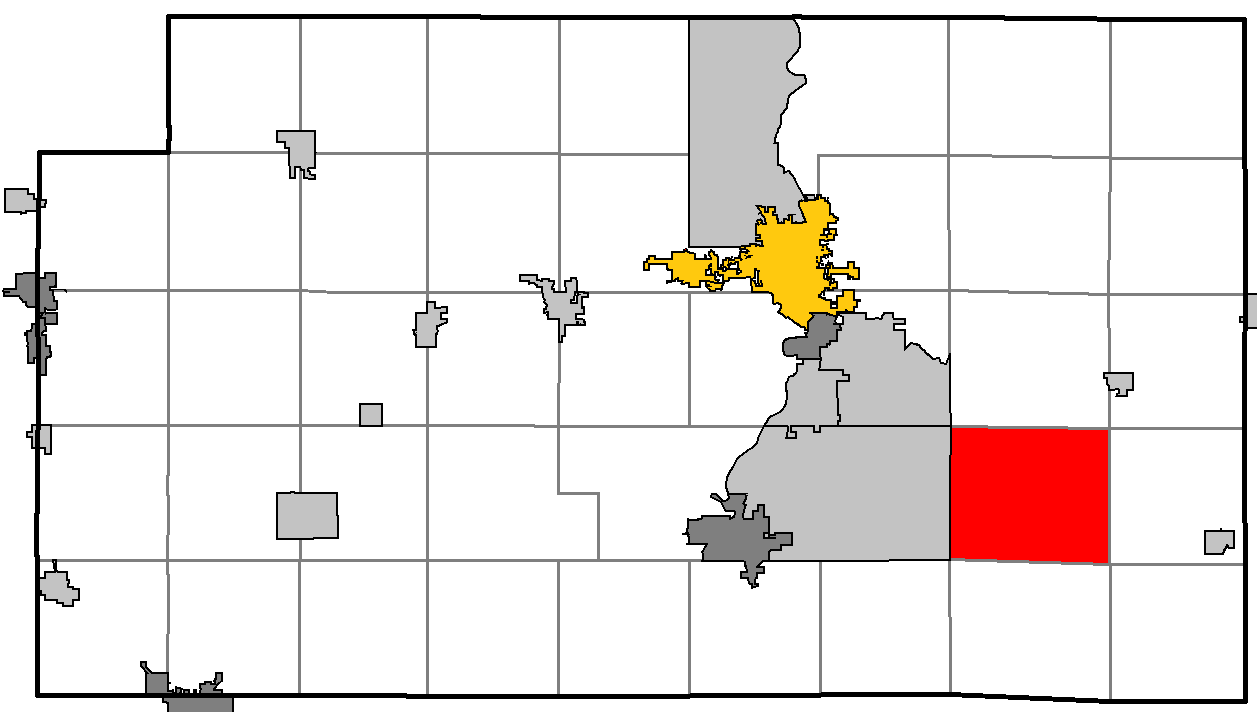
- Location of the Town of Reid, Marathon County

- Location of Marathon County, Wisconsin
- Coordinates: 44°48′33″N 89°24′8″W
- Country: United States
- State: Wisconsin
- County: Marathon

Area
  - Total: 42.2 sq mi (109.3 km^{2})
  - Land: 41.6 sq mi (107.8 km^{2})
  - Water: 0.58 sq mi (1.5 km^{2})
- Elevation: 1,263 ft (385 m)

Population (2020)
  - Total: 1,186
  - Density: 28.49/sq mi (11.00/km^{2})
- Time zone: UTC-6 (Central (CST))
  - Summer (DST): UTC-5 (CDT)
- Area codes: 715 & 534
- FIPS code: 55-66950
- GNIS feature ID: 1584009

The Town of Reid is located in Marathon County, Wisconsin, United States. It is part of the Wausau, WI Metropolitan Statistical Area. The population was 1,186 at the 2020 census. The unincorporated communities of Little Eau Claire and Pike Lake are located in the town. The unincorporated community of Bevent is located partially in the town.

== Geography ==
According to the United States Census Bureau, the town has a total area of 42.2 square miles (109.3 km^{2}), of which 41.6 square miles (107.8 km^{2}) is land and 0.6 square miles (1.5 km^{2}), or 1.35%, is water.

== Demographics ==
At the 2000 census there were 1,191 people, 434 households, and 345 families living in the town. The population density was 28.6 people per square mile (11.0/km^{2}). There were 475 housing units at an average density of 11.4 per square mile (4.4/km^{2}). The racial makeup of the town was 98.99% White, 0.08% African American, 0.17% Asian, 0.08% from other races, and 0.67% from two or more races. Hispanic or Latino of any race were 0.84%.

Of the 434 households 37.1% had children under the age of 18 living with them, 69.8% were married couples living together, 6.0% had a female householder with no husband present, and 20.5% were non-families. 16.1% of households were one person and 6.7% were one person aged 65 or older. The average household size was 2.74 and the average family size was 3.08.

The age distribution was 26.7% under the age of 18, 6.5% from 18 to 24, 33.4% from 25 to 44, 23.3% from 45 to 64, and 10.1% 65 or older. The median age was 36 years. For every 100 females, there were 107.5 males. For every 100 females age 18 and over, there were 105.4 males.

The median household income was $50,972 and the median family income was $55,781. Males had a median income of $32,763 versus $28,942 for females. The per capita income for the town was $20,859. About 1.8% of families and 2.7% of the population were below the poverty line, including 1.3% of those under age 18 and 5.0% of those age 65 or over.
