= Eau Pleine =

Eau Pleine may refer to the following locations in the U.S. state of Wisconsin:

== Towns ==
- Eau Pleine, Marathon County, Wisconsin
- Eau Pleine, Portage County, Wisconsin

== Rivers ==
- Big Eau Pleine River
- Little Eau Pleine River
