= Dubay =

Dubay may refer to:

== People ==
- Bill DuBay (1948–2010), American comic-book editor, writer and artist
- Eric Dubay, American conspiracy theorist
- John Baptiste DuBay (1810–1887), American fur trapper
- Matt Dubay, a litigant in the Matt Dubay child support case
- Thomas Dubay (1921–2010), American Catholic priest, author and retreat director
- William DuBay (born 1934), controversial American Catholic priest and activist

== Other uses ==
- Lake DuBay, a reservoir in Wisconsin, United States
- United States v. DuBay, a 1967 case which established procedure in courts-martial

== See also ==
- Dubai, a city in the United Arab Emirates
