= Grandfather Falls =

Waterfall in Wisconsin

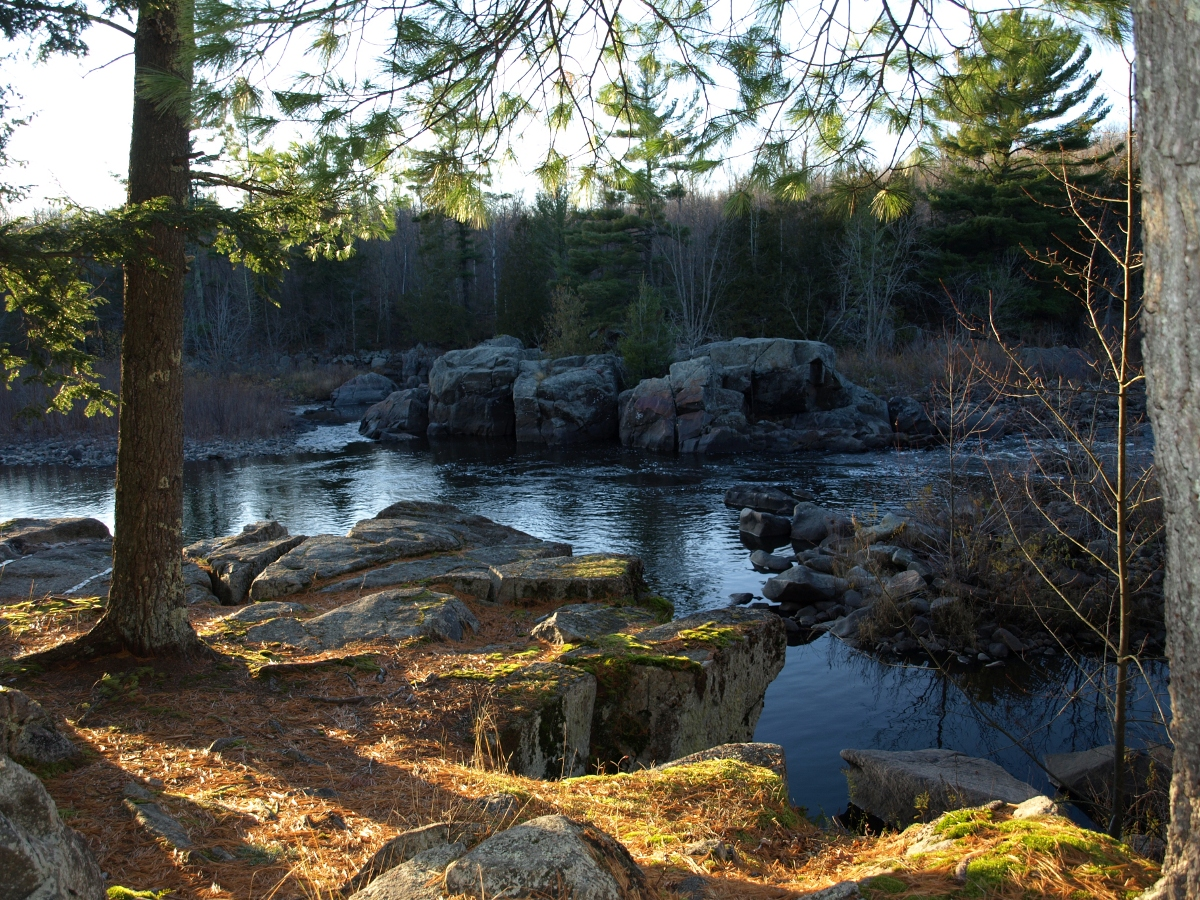
- Exposed pre-Cambrian rock, midway down the falls.

- Location within Wisconsin
- Location: Lincoln County, Wisconsin
- Coordinates: 45°18′47″N 89°47′05″W
- Total height: 89 ft (27 m)

Grandfather Falls is the highest waterfall on the Wisconsin River. The total drop is 89 feet, spread out in a series of cascades over about one mile. The upper third of the falls and most of the flow, except in the spring, is diverted through a canal and a series of penstocks to feed hydroelectric generators. Grandfather Falls dam and power generating facility is owned and operated by Wisconsin Public Service Corporation.

The cascade has been known historically as Grandfather Bull Falls and as Boileaux Rapids. Other phonetic variations on Boileaux such as Beauleaux and Brearbeaux are also sometimes seen in older accounts and maps. The Ojibwe name for the cascade was "Konajewun" which means "long falls".

Many of the falls and rapids on the Wisconsin River had the word "Bull" inserted in the name, such as Big Bull Falls at what is now Wausau and Jenny Bull Falls at what is now Merrill. These derive from voyageurs working for John Baptiste DuBay, who ran a trading post for John Jacob Astor's American Fur Company near Fort Winnebago, and built a pioneering trading post and homestead near Knowlton. While traveling up stream, a party of these voyageurs encountered the rapids at Mosinee and named it Taureau, French for "bull." When they encountered the rapids at Wausau, which were bigger, they named them Gros Taureau — "Big Bull." When they encountered the much larger rapids 40 miles further up stream, they named them Taureau Grand-père. This began a tradition for naming all the falls on the upper Wisconsin.

== Geologic history ==
Several hundred million years ago, the northern highlands of Wisconsin were an alpine mountain range. Beneath this range, igneous rock formed which now is called pre-Cambrian bedrock, the top layers of the mountains having been worn down by erosion. In more recent geologic time, glaciers scoured the surface exposing this pre-Cambrian rock in many areas, leaving irregular drainage throughout the north woods with many rapids and falls as features of the streams. Grandfather Falls lies in this pre-Cambrian rock bed, and is thus a remnant of the physical geography of this ancient mountain range.

== Early river navigation ==
=== Trade route and portage ===
Although there are no precise records of when and to what degree trade started on the upper Wisconsin, it was known to be a significant route by around the turn of the nineteenth century. Lac du Flambeau was a large Ojibwe town within which Montreal fur traders built semi-permanent trading posts, including by more than one company simultaneously. These traders sent employees on excursions down river to trade with Ojibwe towns and camps which existed as far south as the Yellow River. When traveling to the satellite Ojibwe villages downstream, it was necessary to portage the Falls. By the time US federal surveyors arrived to take their data in 1851, the portage road was well-established.

A story extant from the period describes what was probably the first and only canoe trip down the falls:

In 1849, these falls were navigated, in a bark canoe, for the first and last time by two Indians — the Black Nail and the Crow. At the head of the falls before starting, Crow held the canoe by a rock projecting from the shore, while Black Nail made a prayer and an offering to the spirit of the falls. The offering consisted of two yards of scarlet broad cloth, and a brass kettle ... [After saying the] prayer, he threw the offering overboard, and grappled his paddle, and the canoe went bounding over the billows, and ran the falls in safety.

As Jenny (Merrill) developed in the 1870s, it became a point of departure for suppliers to the logging camps:

[I]n the summer months canoes were the common means of conveyance. From 1,000 to 1,200 pounds could be loaded on a canoe and the trip from Jenny to Grandfather made in a day, and as many as 25 or 30 canoes were often seen on the water, each with three men bound for Grandfather. It required four days to make the trip to Eagle River by this means and two to return downstream.

=== Barrier to lumber rafts, problem for log drives ===
The principal means by which the lumber mills along the Wisconsin River sent their product to market was lumber rafts. Lumber rafts were used before railroads were built in the region, but to some extent even afterwards. The product was the raft itself, constructed of the boards which were to be sold at Saint Louis and other cities along the Mississippi. Special techniques and training were developed in order to optimize the amount of product that successfully made it, although due to accidents on several dangerous stretches of the river some times these lumber rafts were smashed into splinters — and many times the workers running the rafts were killed.

It was virtually impossible to run these lumber rafts down Grandfather Falls. As a consequence, Jenny (Merrill) became the northernmost sawmill town. The Falls acted as a hazard to log drives as well. Prior to railroads penetrating the pineries in the 1880s, logs for the mills were cut and "banked" along the river and its tributaries, and in the spring of the year the logs were "driven" downstream to the mills. This work was always dangerous and difficult, but nothing was more dangerous than a log jam. Once a set of logs started to clog up a river, the rest would back up behind. The largest log jam in Wisconsin history was at Grandfather Falls — 80,000,000 board feet backed up for miles.

A prime goal of river development up stream, either by the Wisconsin River Improvement Company or by any of the other dams such as the Tomahawk Dam (built in 1887), was to provide flushing water to float logs down the river in general, but specifically over the problematic Grandfather Falls. The Falls itself had three stone dams to aid in the flushing of logs as well. In the Wisconsin lumbering era, this issue was of such a concern that it made front-page news as a business-related item in newspapers around the state, in the same way that modern business pages report shipping traffic or the price of oil.

== Development at the Falls ==
The upper flushing dam was eventually developed for sawing lumber by Peter B. Champagne in 1880. He enhanced the dam, and on the east side constructed a mill race. With the sawmill came mill workers, and the need to house the workers, so eventually a modest sized town built up that included a livery stable, boarding house, store, saloon and post office. The post office acquired the official name of Champagne and the village, never incorporated, was known variously as Champagne or Grandfather Falls. With the boarding house and other facilities, as wagon traffic increased on the road north into the woods — traffic that included loggers and other workers like surveyors, as well as commercial traffic all the way to Ontonagon — the village became a stopping point for travelers to refresh themselves and feed and water their horses.

Once the railroads penetrated the north woods — the Milwaukee Road, a few miles east; the Soo Line, going east–west a few miles north; and rival north–south railroads just 25 miles or so to the east and west — the general situation change drastically as the towns upstream could now ship finished lumber directly to market by rail. Thus Tomahawk and Rhinelander began to boom, and the sawmills from Merrill south began a steady decline. Even to the extent that the downstream mills stayed economically viable, log drives disappeared. Instead logs themselves could now be brought by rail to the mills. The decline in sawmills did not mean a decline in the forest products economy, as the paper industry steadily emerged as a major economic force in the north woods. However, as a barrier to commerce Grandfather Falls ceased to become an issue.

== Modern hydroelectric development ==
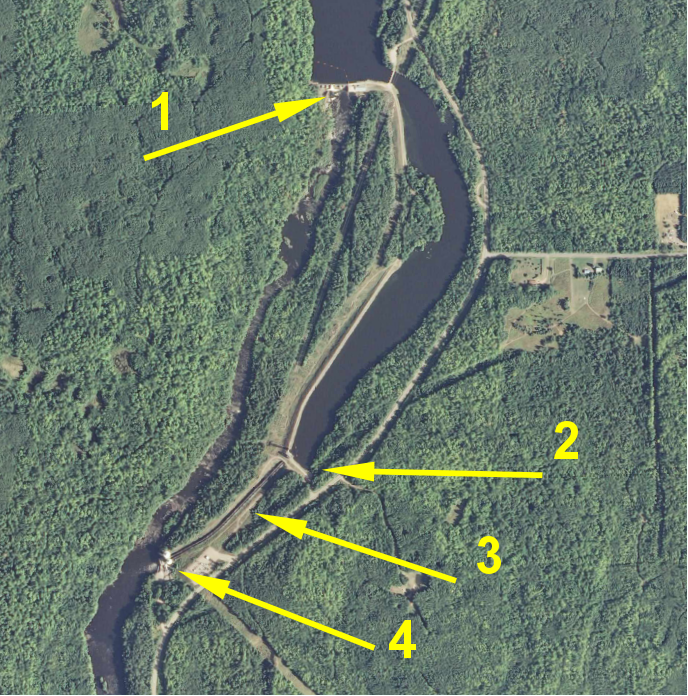
Satellite view of Grandfather Falls hydro complex. 1: upper dam. 2: penstock intake. 3: penstocks. 4: power house. The distance from the upper dam to the power house is about 1 mile.

In 1938 Wisconsin Public Service Corporation commenced a major project to exploit the entire 90 foot drop for power. On the east side of the river, construction crews built a canal which diverts the water to two intake ports feeding penstocks. These penstocks carry the water about 1/3 mile horizontally and 92 feet vertically. At the bottom, a power plant converts the water into about 17 megawatts of electrical power using two generators. A key component of the system are two surge towers which rise above the plant. These dampen the flow and allow maximum energy from the gravitational force of the water to drive the generator wheels, thus optimizing overall efficiency. The Grandfather Falls system produces the highest energy of all the hydroelectric plants that WPSC wholly owns. (One plant that WPSC owns jointly produces 20 megawatts.)

== Navigability of the Wisconsin River ==
The Wisconsin River is a "navigable river of the United States," an official designation that means Congress has authority to govern its use under the Commerce Clause of the US Constitution. The fact that Grandfather Falls was a barrier to lumber rafts but not to logs was an essential fact in a key case which determined its navigability. The plaintiffs in the case argued that since logs were driven from above the Falls to mills between Wisconsin Rapids and Merrill, for that section of the river the commerce was intrastate only, and not interstate. The court considered this fact, but ruled against this argument. Citing precedent, the court said, "The sawing of the logs into lumber at the mills and the change in the mode of transportation did not divide the journey from 'the Pineries' to 'market' into two distinct, unrelated journeys, the first of which is purely intrastate and the other interstate ..." The practical aspect of this designation generally does not have bearing on recreational use of the river, but primarily means that dams — such as the hydroelectric project at Grandfather Falls — require licensing by the Federal Energy Regulatory Commission.

== Recreational use ==
Access to fishing and other general use of the river and the shoreline is granted by the landowners. Warning signs and caution signs should be followed. A portion of the Wisconsin Ice Age Trail runs nearby. Camp New Wood County, situated on the site of a historic Civilian Conservation Corps camp, is located a few miles south and offers primitive camping and access to the river for fishing and other uses.

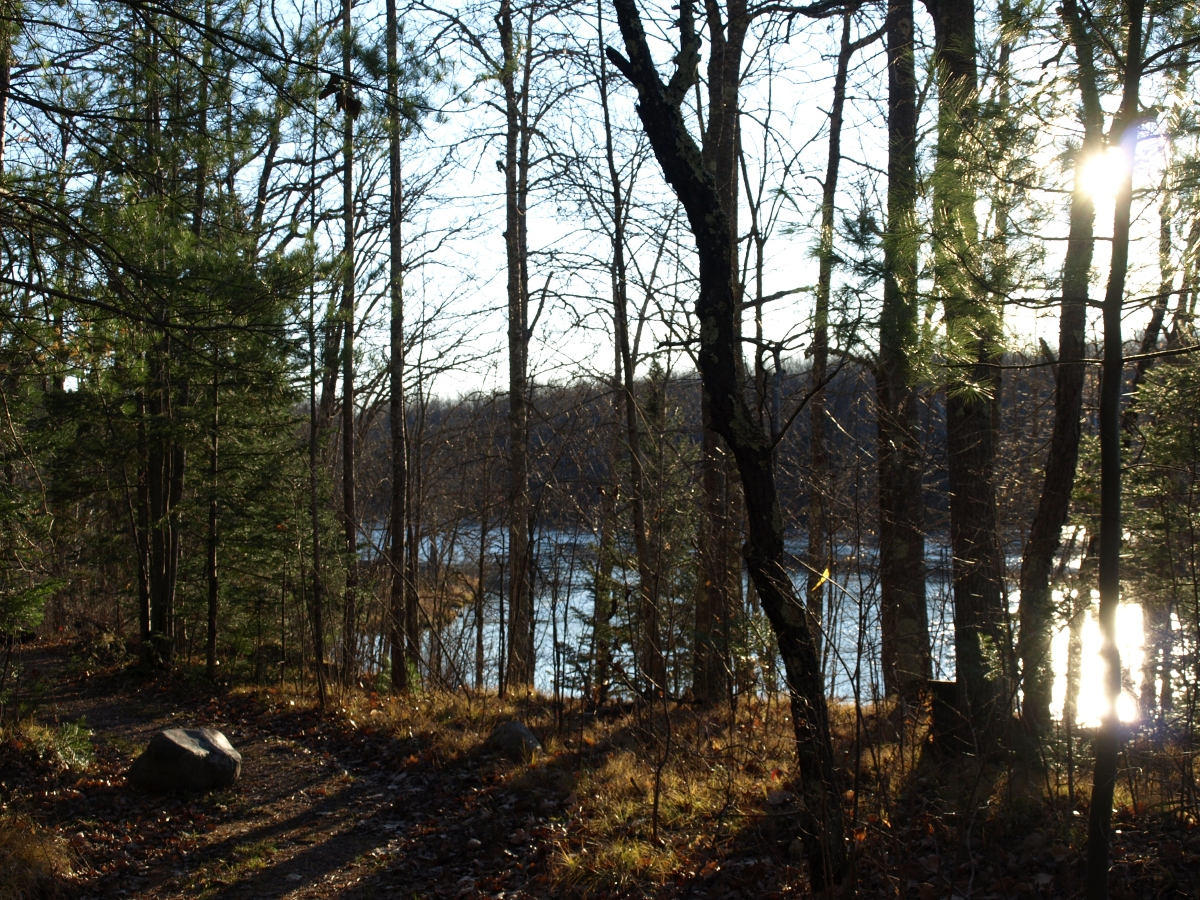
River view from Camp New Wood County Park.

== See also ==
- List of waterfalls
