= Lake DuBay =

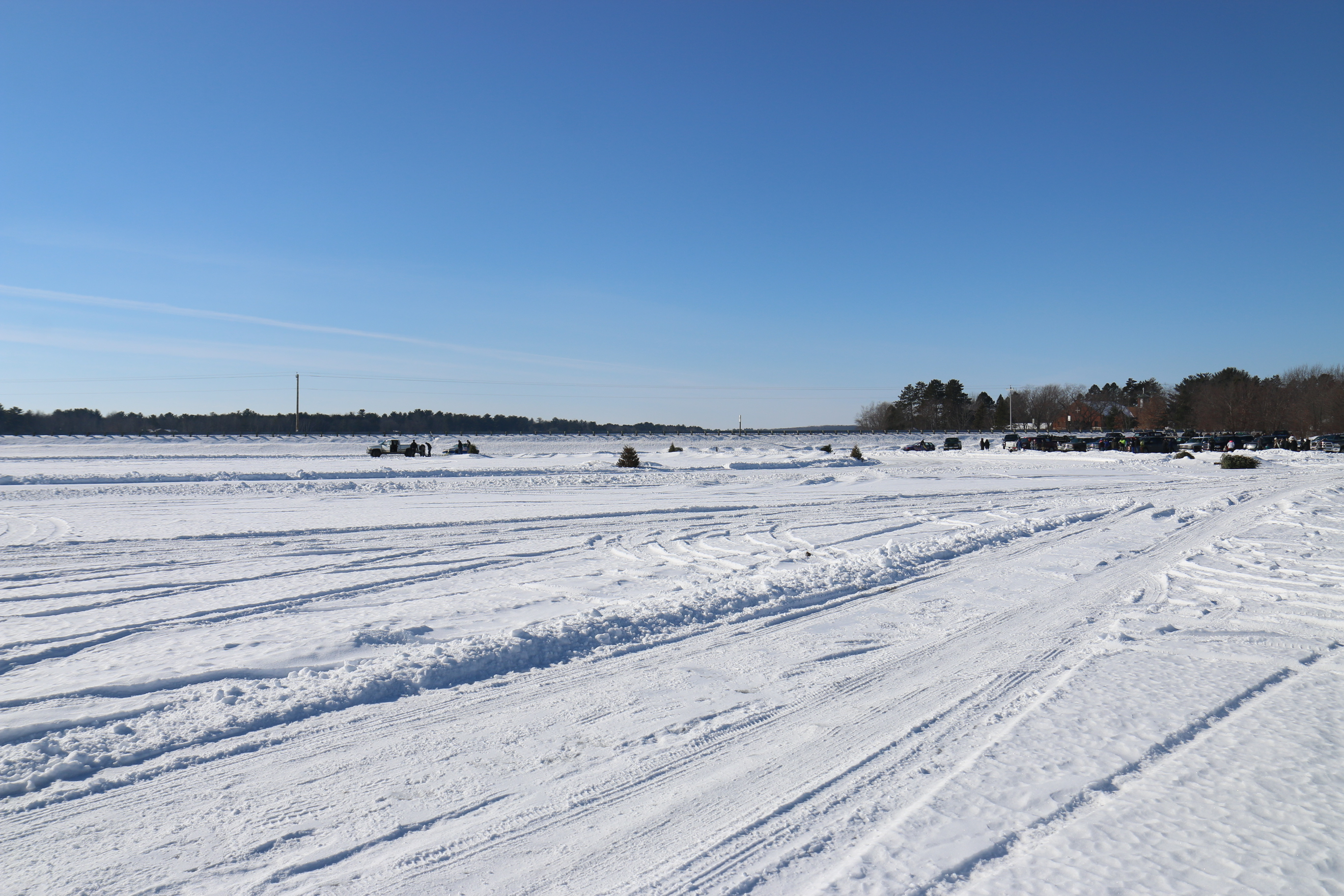
- Frozen Lake DuBay in 2017

- Location within Wisconsin Location within the United States
- Location: Marathon and Portage Counties, Wisconsin
- Coordinates: 44°42′52″N 89°41′43″W
- Primary inflows: Wisconsin River, Big Eau Pleine River, Little Eau Pleine River, Little Eau Claire River
- Primary outflows: Wisconsin River
- Basin countries: United States
- Surface area: 6,700 acres (2,700 ha)
- Max. depth: 30 ft (9.1 m)
- Shore length^{1}: 42.3 mi (68.1 km)
- Surface elevation: 1,115 ft (340 m)
- Settlements: Knowlton, Wisconsin
- ^{1} Shore length is not a well-defined measure.

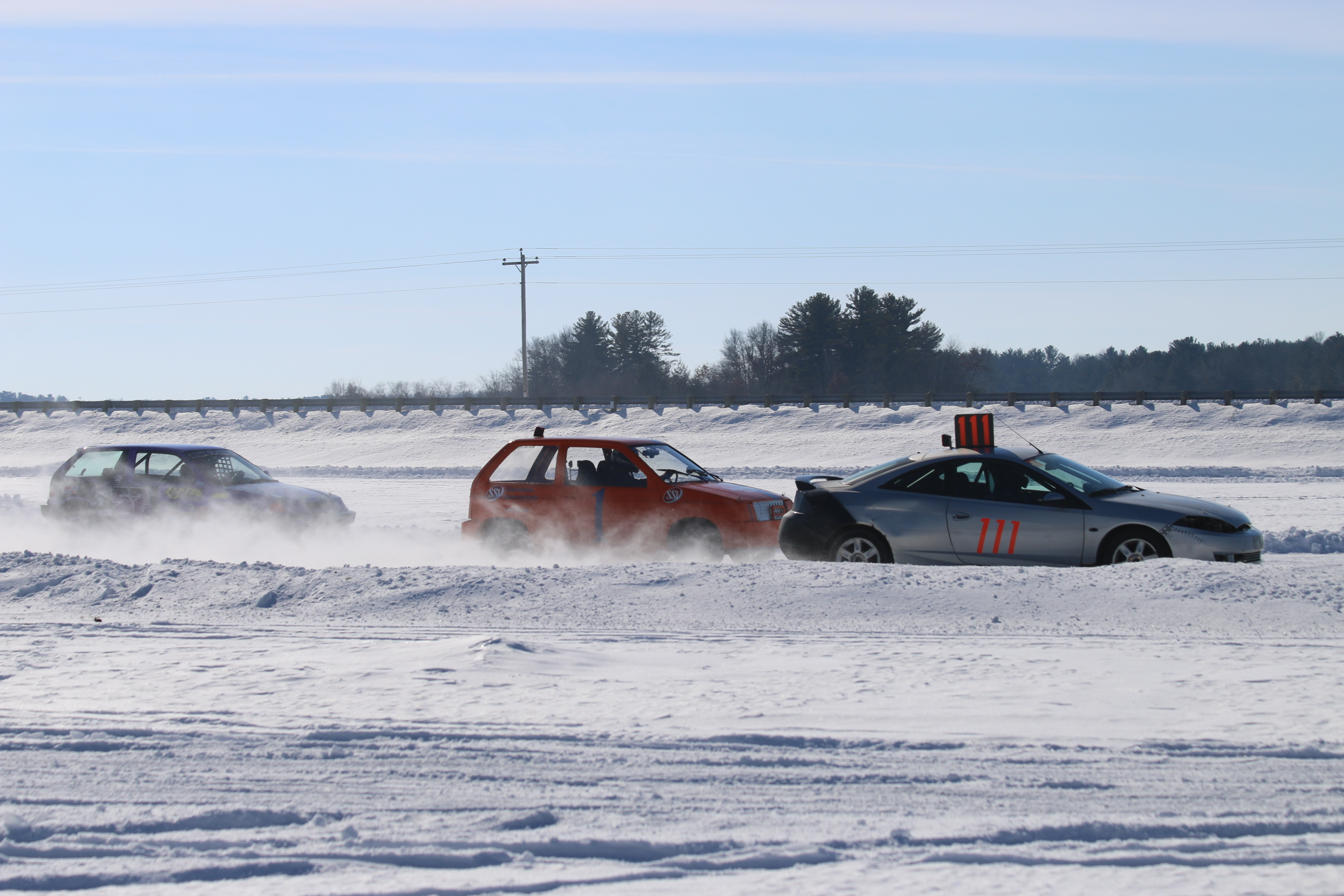
Front Wheel Drive Studded cars racing on Lake DuBay in the Winter Thunder program

Lake DuBay is a reservoir on the Wisconsin River in Marathon and Portage Counties in the U.S. state of Wisconsin. The lake covers an area of 6,700 acres (2,700 ha) and has a maximum depth of 30 feet (9.1 m). A dam on the lake is used to generate hydroelectric power. The community of Knowlton is located on the shore of the lake, as are 122 homes and three parks. Interstate 39 and U.S. Route 51 provide access to the lake, as do several county highways. While the lake is frozen in winter, it is used for ice racing by the "Winter Thunder Club".

== See also ==
- John Baptiste DuBay
