= Wisconsin River =

Major river in Wisconsin, United States

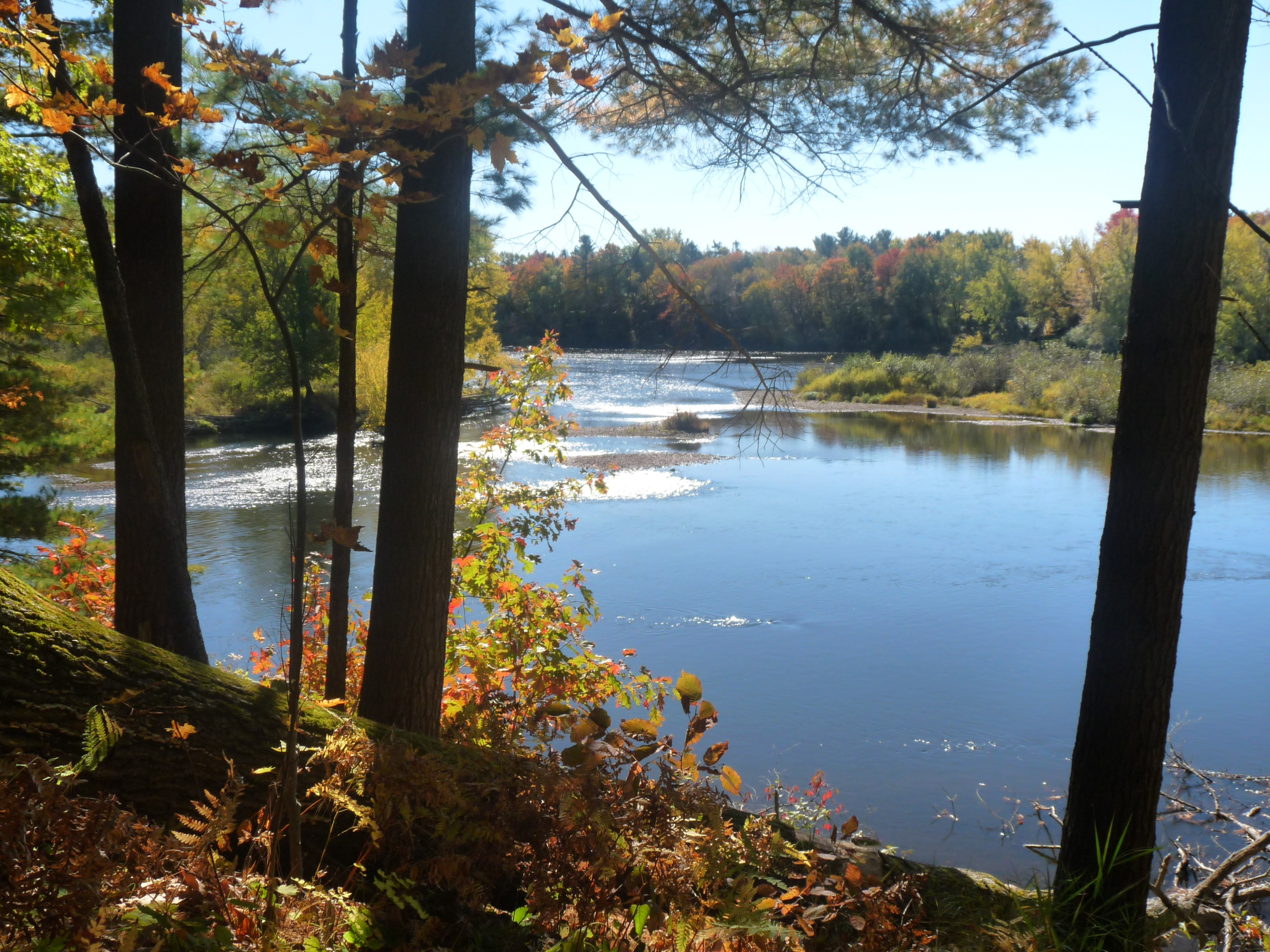
- Below the Alexander dam at Merrill

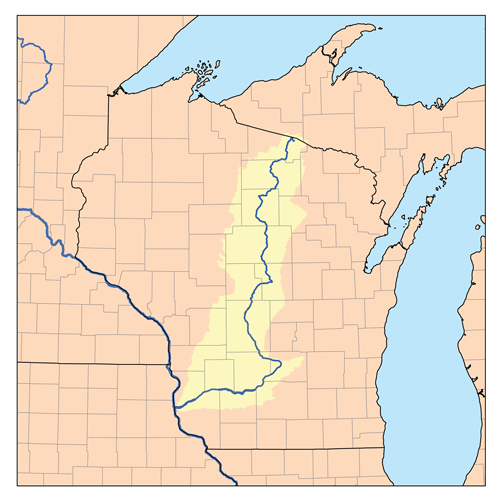
- Wisconsin and the Wisconsin River

Location
- Country: United States
- State: Wisconsin

Physical characteristics
- Source
  - location: Lac Vieux Desert
  - elevation: 1,683 ft (513 m)
- Mouth
  - location: Mississippi River near Prairie du Chien, Wisconsin
- Length: 420 mi (680 km)
- Basin size: 12,280 sq mi (31,800 km^{2})
- Discharge
  - average: 12,000 cu ft/s (340 m^{3}/s) at mouth

Ramsar Wetland
- Official name: Lower Wisconsin Riverway
- Designated: 14 February 2020
- Reference no.: 2417

The Wisconsin River is the longest river in the U.S. state of Wisconsin, at approximately 430 miles (692 km) long. As a tributary of the Mississippi River, it is part of the Mississippi River System. The river's name was first recorded in 1673 by Jacques Marquette as "Meskousing" from his Indian guides - most likely Miami for "river running through a red place."

The river has been used for transportation, hunting, and fishing since prehistoric times. In the lumber industry, loggers used the upper reaches of the river and its tributaries to drive logs to their sawmills and the lower reaches to float rafts of sawn boards to markets as near as Portage and as far as St. Louis. Today, it is source of energy and tourism: dams along the river generate hydroelectric power, and people fish, boat, water-ski and sight-see on the river. It is home to many species of fish and other wildlife.

== Geography ==
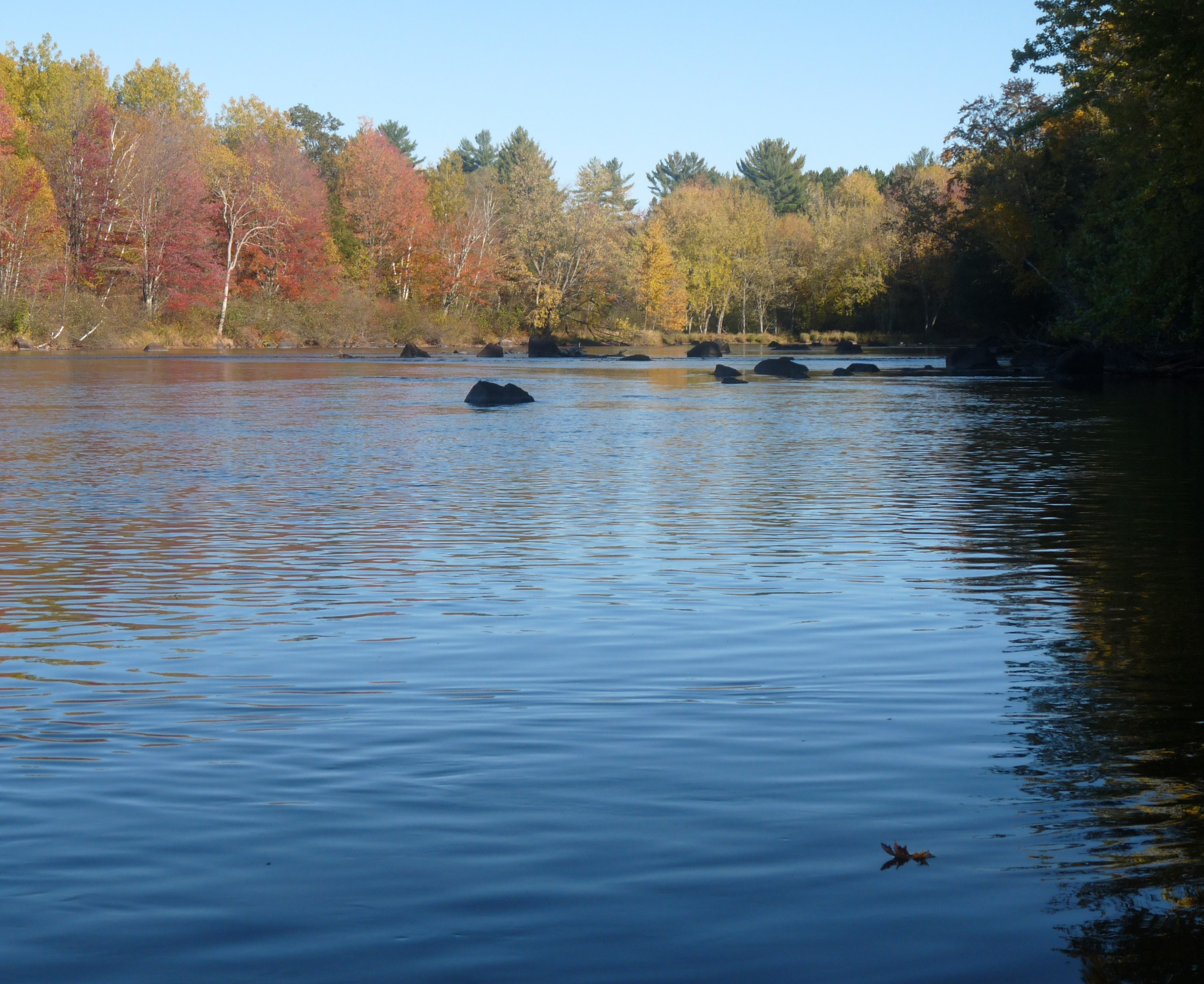
Between Tomahawk and Rhinelander, where the river is rock-bottomed

The Wisconsin is the longest river in the state, arising at the Michigan border in the northeast and emptying into the Mississippi River far to the southwest near Prairie du Chien. It originates in the forests of the North Woods Lake District in Lac Vieux Desert on the border with the Upper Peninsula of Michigan. It flows south across the glacial plain of central Wisconsin, passing through Wausau, Stevens Point, and Wisconsin Rapids. In southern Wisconsin, it encounters the terminal moraine formed during the last ice age, where it flows through the Dells of the Wisconsin River. North of Madison at Portage the river turns to the west, flowing through Wisconsin's hilly Western Upland and joining the Mississippi approximately 3 miles (4.8 km) south of Prairie du Chien.

Before the Grandfather Falls dam was built in Lincoln County, that series of rapids constituted the largest drop in a short distance on the river. Over the course of a mile and a half, the river dropped 89.5 feet.

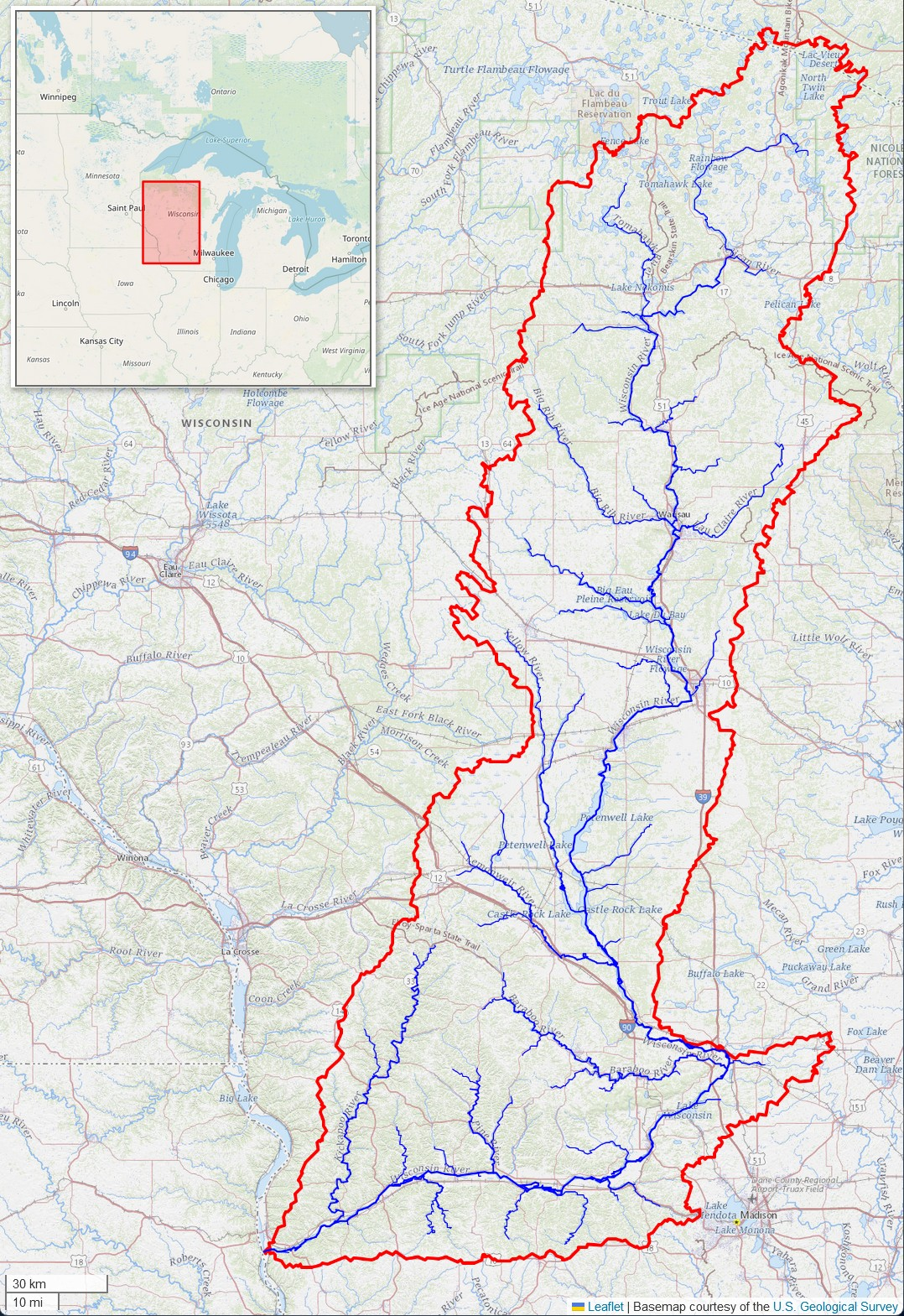
Wisconsin River watershed (Interactive map)

Major tributaries of the Wisconsin are the following, working upstream from the Mississippi: the Kickapoo River, the Pine River, the Baraboo River, the Lemonweir River, the Yellow River, the Little Eau Pleine River the Big Eau Pleine River, the Eau Claire River, the Big Rib River, the Tomahawk River, and the Pelican River.

The river borders Adams, Juneau, Columbia, Sauk, Dane, Iowa, Richland, Grant, and Crawford Counties.

=== Formation of the river ===
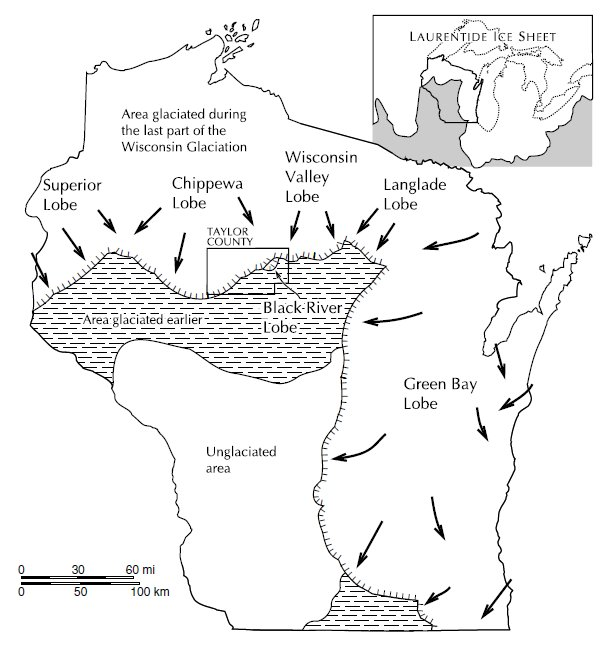
Maximum extent of the Laurentide Ice Sheet

The modern Wisconsin River was formed in several stages. Most recent was the northernmost segment of the river, from the source to around modern Merrill. During the last ice age an ice sheet crept down from Canada, and a section called the Wisconsin Valley Lobe bulged down the valley that would become the Wisconsin River to near Merrill. As the climate warmed and that ice sheet receded about 14,000 years ago, meltwater drained down the valley, eventually cutting a course similar to the modern river.

The next segment, from Merrill to around Wisconsin Rapids, was probably formed as earlier glaciers retreated, hundreds of thousands of years ago. Like the northern segment, the bedrock beneath is pre-Cambrian igneous and metamorphic rock - hard-to-erode stuff that produces frequent rapids.

The next segment, from Wisconsin Rapids to the Baraboo Hills, flows through a sand plain. Though the last ice sheet stopped around Merrill, another lobe of the ice sheet to the east reached far to the south, butting up against the east end of the Baraboo Hills. With drainage blocked, water backed up north of the hills, forming Glacial Lake Wisconsin, which reached from modern Baraboo north to Wisconsin Rapids. As the ice sheet receded, meltwater carried sand and silt ground by the glacier into the lake, where the water slowed and its sediment settled to form a fairly flat lake bed. When warming began to melt back the ice against the Baraboo Hills, about 18,000 years ago, the flowing water quickly opened the gap and poured through, carving the Wisconsin Dells and cutting the start of the river's channel through the sand plain. Subsequent erosion has further cut that channel through the flat plain.

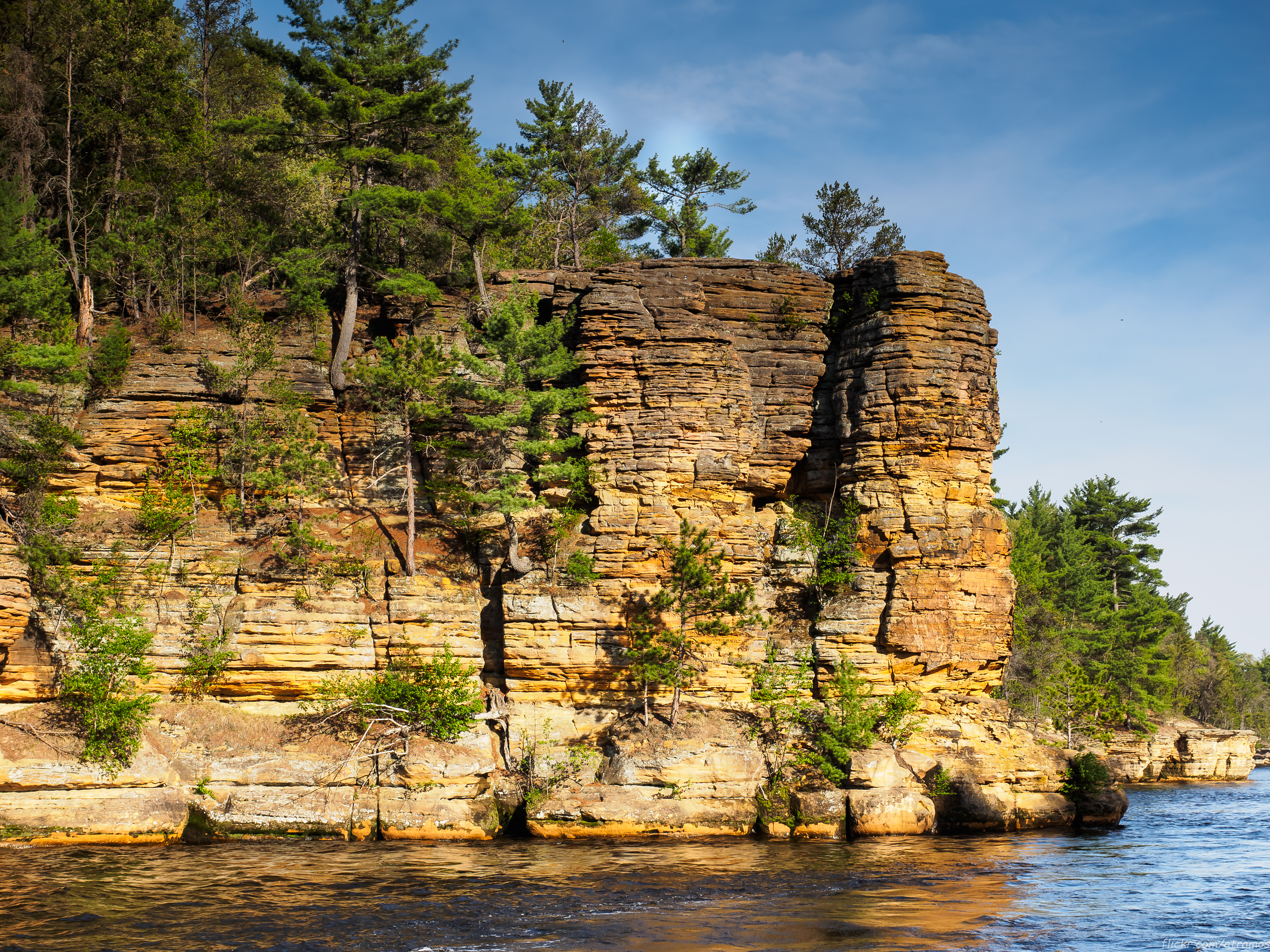
Dells of the Wisconsin River, 2014.

The lower, westward-flowing portion of the river, between the Baraboo Hills and the Mississippi, is probably the oldest section. Passing through the Driftless Area, it was never covered by a glacier. The western, lower end of the river is narrower than its upstream valley, leading to the suggestion that an ancestor river once flowed east through this segment.

== Wildlife ==
The Wisconsin River contains many fish common in Wisconsin, including walleye, sauger, saugeye, Northern pike, muskies, smallmouth bass, largemouth bass, channel catfish, flathead catfish, sturgeon and panfish.

Many other animals live at the Wisconsin River watershed, including bald eagles, beavers, and many other species of mammals, reptiles, and amphibians.

== History ==
=== Early ===
Native Americans had long used the Wisconsin as a highway through the forests, canoeing and fishing it, living along its banks and burying their dead there. At times they fought, but they also met to trade, and several tribes could share the same hunting grounds.

In 1673, French missionary Jacques Marquette, French-Canadian explorer Louis Joliet, five voyageurs, and two Miami guides arrived near the headwaters of the Fox River - modern-day Portage. From there, they portaged their two canoes slightly less than two miles through marsh and oak plains to the Wisconsin River. They then continued downstream to the Wisconsin's mouth, entering the Mississippi on June 17. Other explorers and traders would follow the same route, and for the next 150 years the Wisconsin and Fox rivers, collectively known as the Fox-Wisconsin Waterway, formed a major transportation route between the Great Lakes and the Mississippi River.

==== The river's name ====
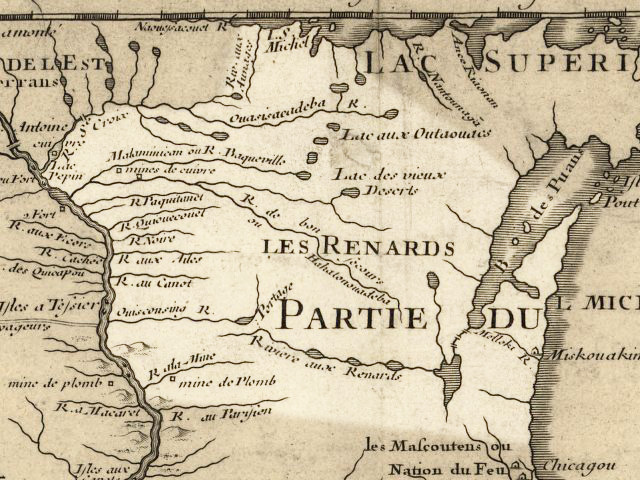
Ouisconsin R., in Guillaume de L'Isle's map, 1718

When Marquette's company entered the Wisconsin River in their two canoes, he wrote:

The river on which we embarked is called Meskousing. It is very wide; it has a sandy bottom, which forms various shoals that rend its navigation very difficult.

This is the first recorded mention of the name that evolved into "Wisconsin," which the state ended up taking. Sieur de La Salle misread Marquette's elaborate 'M' as "Ou" and wrote the name as "Ouisconsin." In the 1800s Americans anglicized the spelling to "Wisconsin."

Antiquarians have long sought the meaning of Meskousing/Wisconsin. Indians and early French residents offered meanings ranging from "stream of a thousand isles" to "gathering of waters" to "muskrat house." In 2003 Michael McCafferty, who specializes in the Miami language, argued that Meskousing is a rendering of "river running through a red place" in the language of the two Miami guides who spoke to Marquette. They were probably referring to the reddish sandstone along the river, like at the Dells.

=== Fur trade era: 1650s-1850s ===
The fur trade reached up the Wisconsin and its tributaries, with traders like John Baptiste Du Bay and Amable Grignon establishing posts along the river where they traded goods like knives and beads with Indians for furs. Franci LeRoi ran a trading post on the portage from the Wisconsin River to the Fox, at modern Portage.

In 1828 the U.S. Army bought LeRoi's building and built Fort Winnebago at his strategic site - the army's third fort in what would become Wisconsin. To build the new fort, one of the officers from the fort led a party up the Wisconsin River, then up its tributary the Yellow to cut pine logs. In the spring of 1829 he and his men floated the logs down to Portage to use in building the fort. That officer was Lt. Jefferson Davis - future president of the Confederacy during the Civil War. This fort, and the river generally, played a role in the final campaign of the Black Hawk War.

Indian territories shifted over time, but just prior to European settlement, the Ojibwe dominated the upper section above modern Wausau, the Menominee the middle section from Wausau to Portage, and the Ho-Chunk the lower section from Portage to Prairie du Chien.

=== Fox-Wisconsin Waterway Improvement (19th Century) ===
The economic success of the Erie Canal, completed in 1825, revived old ideas of how the Fox River and Wisconsin River, which Marquette and Joliet and their Indian guides had traversed 150 years before, could provide a shortcut between the Mississippi valley and the Great Lakes. In 1839 some preliminary surveying was done to assess possibilities and cost. In the 1840s and 50s Congress approved land grants to finance the improvement of the rivers. Work proceeded slowly, done by the government and a succession of private canal companies. In 1854, the first steamship, the Aquila came up from the Mississippi, crossed the canal at Portage, and descended the locks of the Fox to Green Bay. But the upper Fox was shallow and winding. Even less fixable was the lower Wisconsin, with its shallow, shifting sandbars. A railroad executive observed wryly that "navigation could never be secured upon the Wisconsin river until its bottom had been fully lathed and plastered." And railroads finally finished the canal scheme, criss-crossing much of the state by the 1860s and providing a means of hauling freight that ran in winter when the rivers were frozen and in summer when they were low.

=== Lumbering (19th Century) ===
In the mid-1800s the northern half of the Wisconsin watershed held large stands of virgin pine forest. Far to the south on the savannas of southern Wisconsin and the treeless prairies of Iowa, Illinois and Missouri, settlers needed lumber to build their barns and houses. In that era before trucks or even roads, the Wisconsin River offered a way to move lumber from the forests to markets downstream.

In 1827-28 Daniel Whitney started a shingle-making operation near where the Yellow River flowed into the Wisconsin. This was soon shut down by the army because Whitney didn't have proper permission to harvest timber from Indian lands. At that point, northern Wisconsin was still owned by several Indian nations. After obtaining better permissions, entrepreneur Whitney moved on to build the first sawmill on the Wisconsin River in 1831 or 1832 10 miles (16 km) downstream from Wisconsin Rapids, near modern day Nekoosa and the Helena shot tower on the lower Wisconsin around the same time.

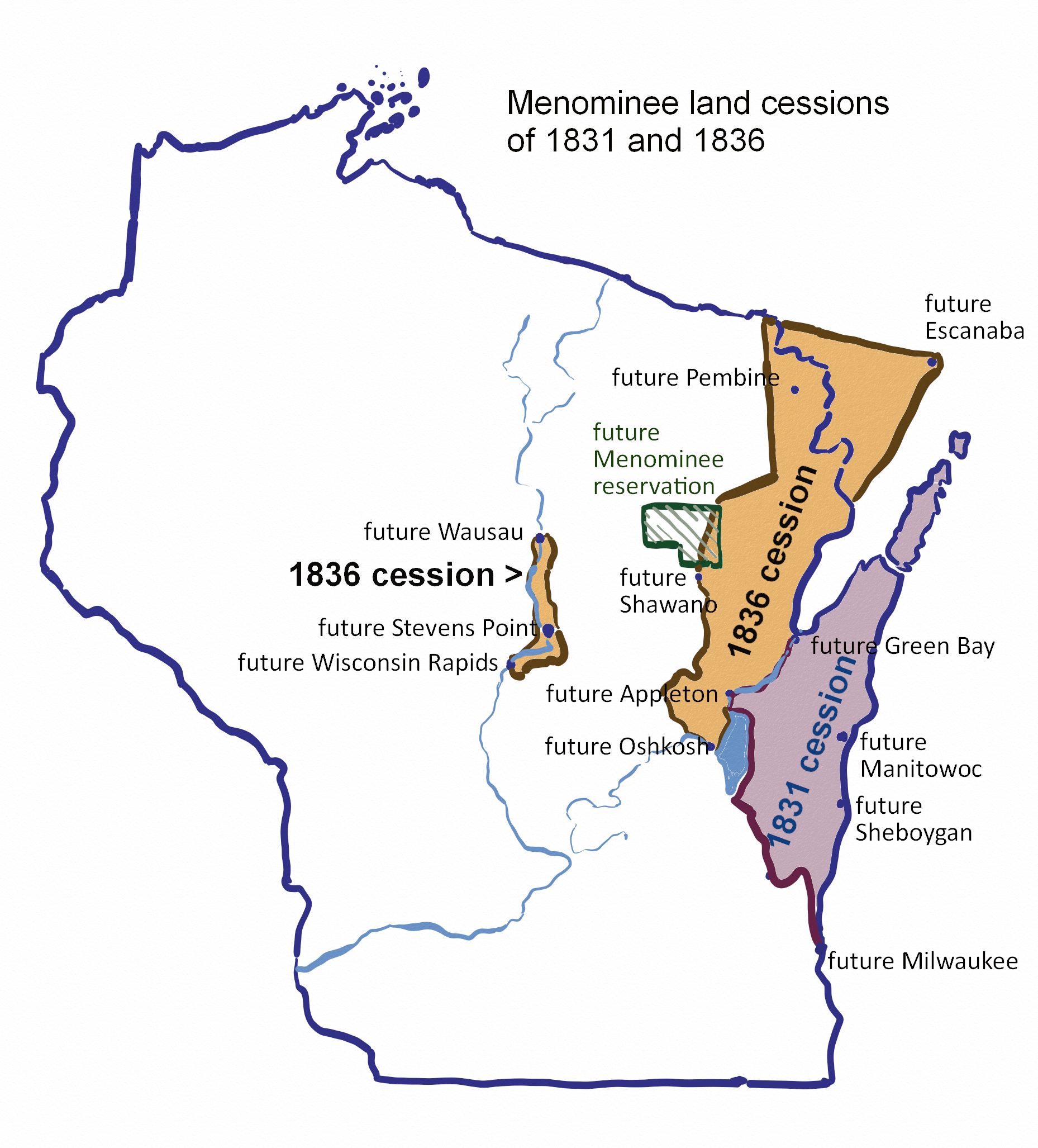

A few years later in 1836 the Menominee ceded some of their land to the US government. Most of this land was in northeast Wisconsin, but the U.S. negotiator pressed them to also cede a six-mile-wide strip along the Wisconsin River from the future site of Nekoosa up to Big Bull Falls (Wausau). He pressed for this land because its pine stood within easy reach of the river, and the river flowed toward parts of Wisconsin (and beyond) that needed lumber. Once the treaty was signed, lumbermen rushed in looking for good mill sites. They found many, because the river had plenty of fall over the hard bedrock in this section. By 1839, all the sites were taken as far north as Big Bull Falls. Of the state's river drainages, the Wisconsin was the first "to be exploited on a large scale" - before the Wolf and the Chippewa.

The lumber industry in the Wisconsin River valley was heavily dependent on the river system until the coming of railroads in the 1870s. In winter, logging camps out in the forests felled trees, cut them into logs typically 16 feet long, and sledded them over icy trails to streambanks where they stacked them in "rollways." In spring, when melting snow raised water levels, lumberjacks rolled the "banked" logs into the river and log driving crews rode them downstream, breaking up log jams and retrieving those that got tangled in sloughs. In 1879 logs jammed the river near Wausau, backing up for four miles. The logging companies built special splash dams to raise water levels when the natural spring floods weren't enough. As driven logs reached the sawmills, log booms in the river were used to capture floating logs and sort them to their appropriate owners.

Sawmills were more scattered along the Wisconsin than other rivers because the Wisconsin presented more challenges to driving logs. That is, on other major rivers the sawmills were concentrated at Oshkosh, La Crosse, Chippewa Falls and Eau Claire, and Stillwater; but on the Wisconsin, mills were strung out from Wisconsin Rapids up through Merrill, so that the logs wouldn't have to be driven so far. The earliest sawmills were powered by the river via waterwheels and turbines at dams.

After being sawed, most of the lumber was rafted to markets down the river. For example, after a Wausau sawmill sawed a 16-foot log into 16-foot boards, the boards were bound into 16 by 16-foot "cribs" twelve to twenty inches deep - floating packets of boards. Six or seven of these cribs were connected into a long, narrow "rapids piece", which could flex at the joints as it went over a rapids or dam - a bit like a string of roller-coaster cars 16 feet wide and 100 feet long, with heavy bumper logs across the front and back, and "spring poles" along each side to tip the front crib up a bit. A long steering oar was mounted on the front of the raft and another on the back, each 36 to 50 feet long. Then the top of the raft was loaded with lath and shingles. Sometimes these rafts were built on the ice, starting in January. (Rafts on other rivers like the Chippewa and St. Croix were built lighter and less flexible, since those rivers were less demanding than the rapids and dams of the upper Wisconsin.)

When the ice was out and the river's water level was high enough, a fleet of twenty or forty of these 100-foot-long rafts would set out under the direction of a pilot. When they came to a dam or rapids, they would tie the rafts to the bank and the pilot and two to eight men would try taking a rapids-piece raft through. Dams were built then with a slide for rafts - a gap about 50 feet wide leading to a ramp of logs descending to the water below. A spectator described a raft going over a dam:

The moment the bow entered the slide it was literally jerked down, and disappeared beneath the wild waters. [Pilot Jack Hawn's] men were lifted off their feet, thrown back upon the raft. Hawn for a moment was overboard, but was caught and pulled aboard - all came out right, the men thoroughly soaked, yet saved the raft. Later in the same day Hawn and Jas. Mowe saved by their daring and skillful handling of a skiff the life of a poor fellow clinging to one of the new piers.

Many rafts were wrecked and men drowned when someone misjudged the current, when a sudden breeze made a raft miss a slide, or by a poorly designed slide. It was reported that forty raftsmen drowned in 1872. The most notorious rapids were Big Bull Falls (future Wausau), Conant's Rapids (Stevens Point), and Grand Rapids (future Wisconsin Rapids), but many thought Little Bull Falls (future Mosinee) was the most dangerous, with a 16-foot ledge in the river starting a race down a narrow, quarter-mile gorge.

Lumbermen tried to reduce the hazards on the river, building timber slides over rapids and dams, dynamiting troublesome points of rock, and building wing dams to focus the current. These improvements were initially made by individual companies, along with splash dams and lumber booms, but it became clear that these investments affected everyone and the burden should be shared and coordinated. To address these concerns, the Little Bull Falls Boom Company was formed in 1852. In 1856 a larger Wisconsin River Boom Company was formed.

When the rafts reached Point Basse below Wisconsin Rapids, they entered a tamer sand-bottomed part of the river. The crews joined three rapids-piece rafts side-by-side into larger rafts 48 feet wide and 100 feet long, called "Wisconsin rafts." From this point, the pilot led a string of rafts slowly down the winding river, trying to avoid shifting sandbars. The Dells still presented hazards, and some rafts were smashed there, but nothing like on the upper Wisconsin. Below the Dells, railroad bridges were a hazard, along with sandbars. When the rafts reached the Mississippi, they were all joined together into a huge "Mississippi raft," and proceeded downriver. Most of them went to St. Louis, where they were disassembled and sold to lumber yards. The whole trip from central Wisconsin to St. Louis took from three weeks to all summer, depending on how much water was flowing and the skill of the raftsmen.

The lumber output of the Wisconsin River valley grew from 6.25 million board feet in 1840 to 19.5 million board feet in 1847 to about 100 million board feet in 1854 to about 200 million board feet per year around 1872. This was a huge output, but other river valleys in Wisconsin produced huge amounts too. Around 1871 the Wisconsin side of the Menominee River was said to produce about 300 million board feet, the Wolf River valley about 180 million board feet, the Black River valley 300 million board feet, the Chippewa River valley over 400 million feet, and the Wisconsin side of the St. Croix over 100 million board feet. With the railroad boom of the 1870s came an alternate means of transporting lumber which didn't depend on spring floods, and went direct to places that the river didn't flow. Nevertheless, rafting remained cheaper transport than railroads, and continued for some years. The last lumber rafts went down the Wisconsin River in 1888, from the sawmill at Biron, heading for St. Louis.

=== Industrialization and Tourism (20th Century) ===
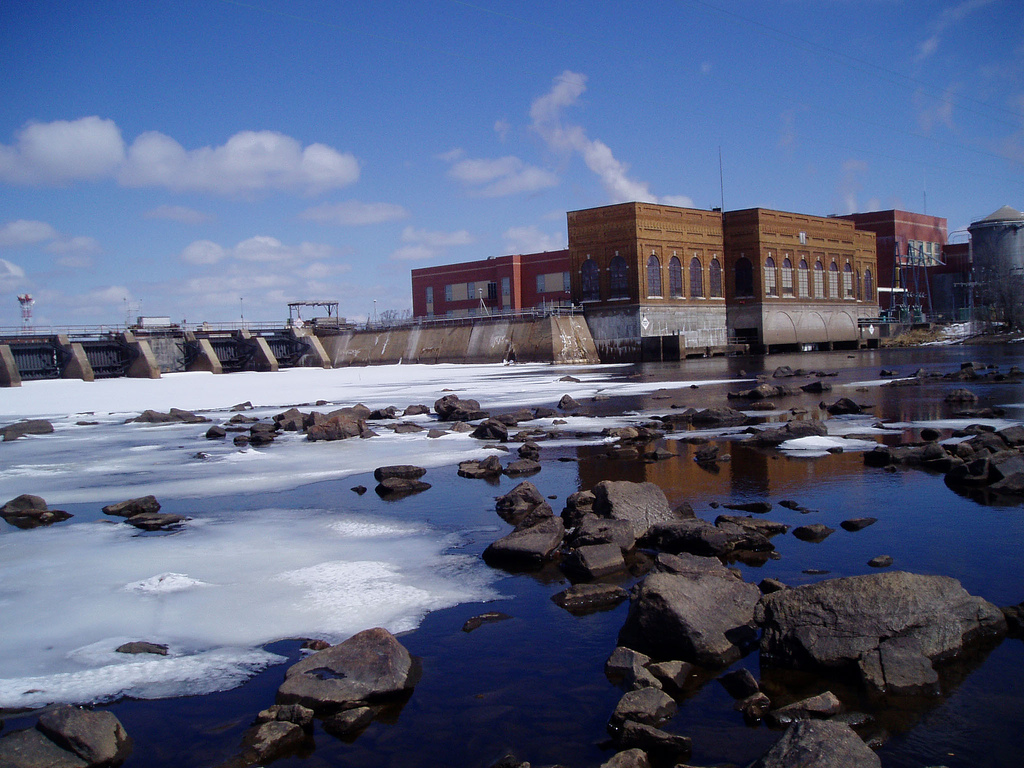
A dam in Stevens Point

Later, in the first half of the 20th century, more dams were constructed to provide for flood control and hydroelectricity. The dams also spurred tourism, creating reservoirs such as Lake Wisconsin that are popular areas for recreational boating and fishing. Today, the Wisconsin River is the hardest working river in the nation. Twenty-five hydroelectric power plants operate on the upper part of the river, above Prairie du Sac. In total, these power plants use 645 feet of the river's drop to generate nearly one billion kilowatt-hours of renewable electricity a year — enough energy to power the homes of over 300,000 people.

A 93-mile (150 km) stretch of the Wisconsin between its mouth and the Prairie du Sac Dam is free of any dams or barriers and is relatively free-flowing. In the late 1980s, this portion of the river was designated as a state riverway, and development alongside the river has been limited to preserve its scenic integrity.

The Wisconsin River goes through two state parks: Wyalusing State Park (at its confluence with the Mississippi) and Tower Hill State Park.

== Governance ==
=== Federal jurisdiction ===
The Wisconsin River is a "navigable river of the United States." This designation primarily means that the federal government has jurisdiction for dams on the river. Dams that include hydropower facilities are regulated by the Federal Energy Regulatory Commission. Courts have ruled that despite the fact that the river lies entirely in one state, it nevertheless historically carried goods to markets in other states and therefore is subject to the Commerce Clause of the United States Constitution. Courts have also ruled that raw logs, even if merely carried via log drives to mills within the state, constitute commerce. On the basis of these judgments, the Wisconsin River is considered a navigable waterway throughout its entire length. This designation does not generally have bearing on recreational use of the river. Boat registrations and fishing licenses are obtained through the Wisconsin Department of Natural Resources, for example.

=== Lower Wisconsin River State Riverway ===
The Lower Wisconsin River State Riverway is a state-funded project designed to protect the southern portion of the Wisconsin River. It extends 93 miles (150 km) from Sauk City to the point where the Wisconsin River empties into the Mississippi, about 3 miles (4.8 km) south of the city of Prairie du Chien. The Wisconsin Department of Natural Resources manages protected lands of over 75,000 acres (300 km^{2}), including the river itself, islands, and some lands adjacent to the river. In 2020 the riverway was designated as a protected Ramsar site.

There are no dams or man-made obstructions to the natural flow of water between the hydroelectric dam just north of Sauk City and the confluence of the Wisconsin and the Mississippi. This long stretch of free-flowing river provides important natural habitats for a variety of wildlife, including white-tail deer, North American river otters, beavers, turtles, sandhill cranes, eagles, hawks, and a variety of fish species.

Recreational opportunities on the lower Wisconsin River range from fishing and canoeing to tubing and camping. Canoe camping is particularly popular because of the abundance of suitable sandbars along the riverway and because no permits are required. Until 2016, naturists could be found on Mazo Beach which is north of the village of Mazomanie. According to the Wisconsin Department of Natural Resources, two thirds of river users can be found on the stretch between Prairie du Sac and Spring Green.

== Cities and villages along the river ==
- Biron
- Brokaw
- Dekorra
- Eagle River
- Knowlton
- Kronenwetter
- Lake Delton
- Lake Wisconsin
- Lone Rock
- Merrill
- Merrimac
- Mosinee
- Muscoda
- Nekoosa
- Okee
- Orion
- Plover
- Port Edwards
- Portage
- Prairie du Sac
- Rhinelander
- Rothschild
- Sauk City
- Schofield
- Spring Green
- Stevens Point
- Tomahawk
- Wausau
- Whiting
- Wisconsin Dells
- Wisconsin Rapids

== List of hydroelectric dams ==
List of hydroelectric dams on the Wisconsin River
Plant / Location	Owner	Reservoir area (Acres)	Height of dam (Feet)	Generation capacity (kW)	Annual generation (mwh)	Coordinates
Otter Rapids	Wisconsin Public Service	3,916	12.5	700	2,432	45.903474°N 89.320828°W
Rhinelander	Expera Specialty Solutions, LLC	3,576	31.8	2,120	10,728	45.638958°N 89.418478°W
Hat Rapids	Wisconsin Public Service	650	20.0	1,950	6,985	45.571272°N 89.480460°W
Kings Dam	Tomahawk Power & Pulp	1,420	23.4	2,582	10,433	45.538792°N 89.746467°W
Jersey	Wisconsin Public Service	709	14.5	512	3,011	45.491864°N 89.750709°W
Tomahawk	Wisconsin Public Service	2,733	16.0	2,600	12,206	45.441251°N 89.730436°W
Grandmother	Packaging Corporation of America	758	18.6	3,000	17,909	45.366814°N 89.729710°W
Grandfather Falls	Wisconsin Public Service	200	92.0	17,240	101,691	45.301855°N 89.791062°W
Alexander	Wisconsin Public Service	803	23.0	4,200	24,103	45.187570°N 89.755179°W
Merrill	Wisconsin Public Service	373	14.0	2,340	6,108	45.178522°N 89.685193°W
Wausau	Wisconsin Public Service	284	27.5	5,400	32,375	44.957371°N 89.636434°W
Rothschild	DOMTAR Inc.	1,604	20.5	3,640	22,736	44.891910°N 89.626053°W
Mosinee	Expera Specialty Solutions, LLC	1,380	21.7	3,050	23,865	44.788706°N 89.701989°W
Dubay	Consolidated Water Power	7,800	25.3	7,200	43,278	44.664949°N 89.651247°W
Stevens Point	Consolidated Water Power	3,915	16.6	3,840	28,184	44.516248°N 89.586079°W
Whiting	Consolidated Water Power	240	22.0	6,340	40,343	44.487281°N 89.575762°W
Biron	Consolidated Water Power	2,078	23.6	6,600	39,467	44.431750°N 89.779793°W
Wisconsin Rapids	Consolidated Water Power	455	30.2	10,050	54,493	44.395181°N 89.823424°W
Centralia	Domtar Inc.	250	15.0	3,500	23,492	44.367879°N 89.857371°W
Port Edwards	Domtar Inc.	150	16.5	2,400	17,863	44.349747°N 89.854244°W
Nekoosa	Domtar Inc.	400	21.4	3,800	26,450	44.312899°N 89.895375°W
Petenwell	Wisconsin River Power Co.	25,180	41.5	20,000	101,540	44.057433°N 90.021744°W
Castle Rock	Wisconsin River Power Co.	14,900	34.0	15,000	93,216	43.865463°N 89.955327°W
Kilbourn Dam	Alliant Energy	2,150	26.6	9,600	58,454	43.626247°N 89.781271°W
Prairie Du Sac	Alliant Energy	9,500	38.0	29,500	135,012	43.310014°N 89.726705°W
Total		85,424	646.2	167,164	936,376	

Hydroelectric dams on the Wisconsin River

== Gallery ==
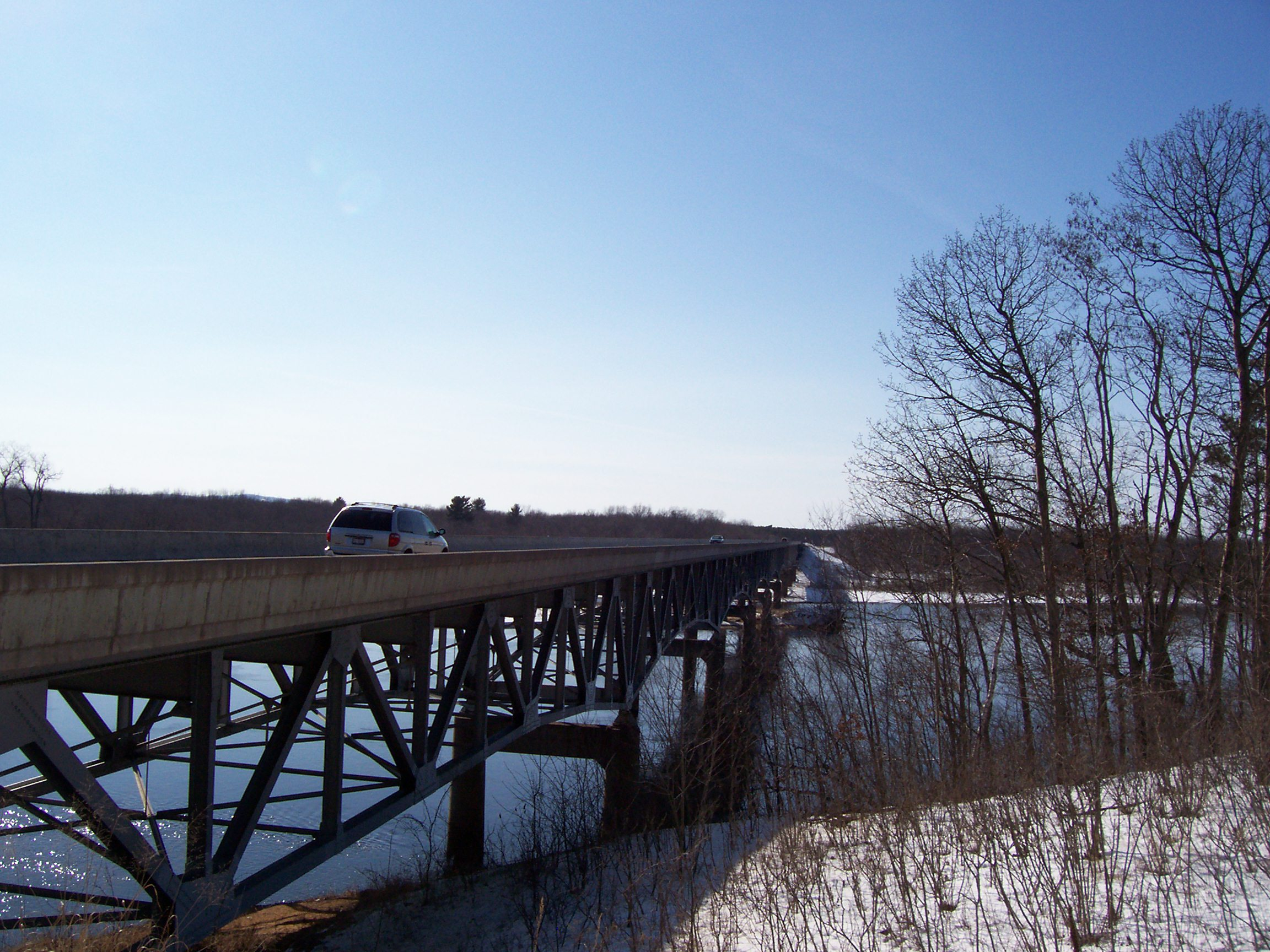
Highway 82 bridge over the Wisconsin River

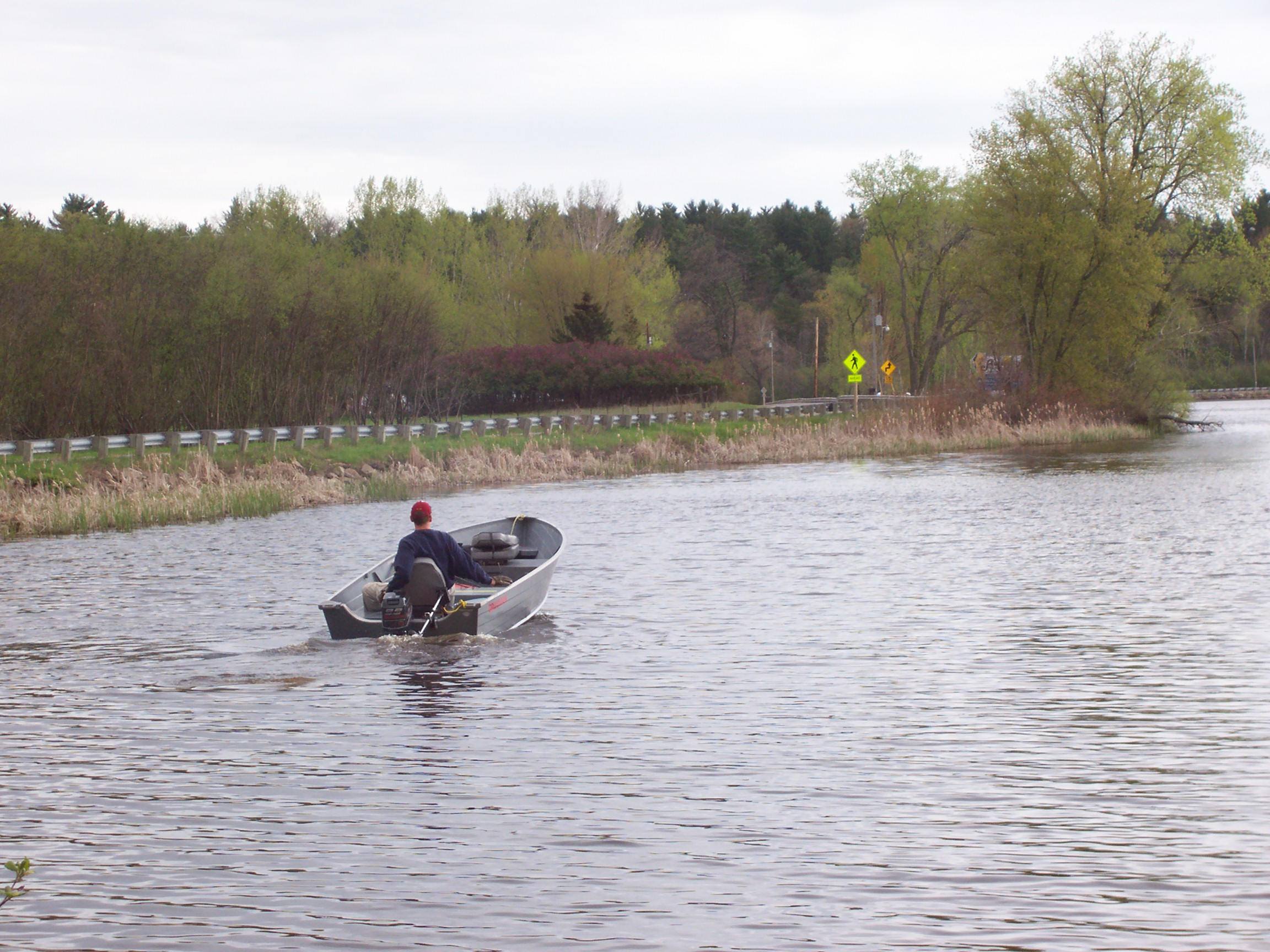
Boating on the Wisconsin River

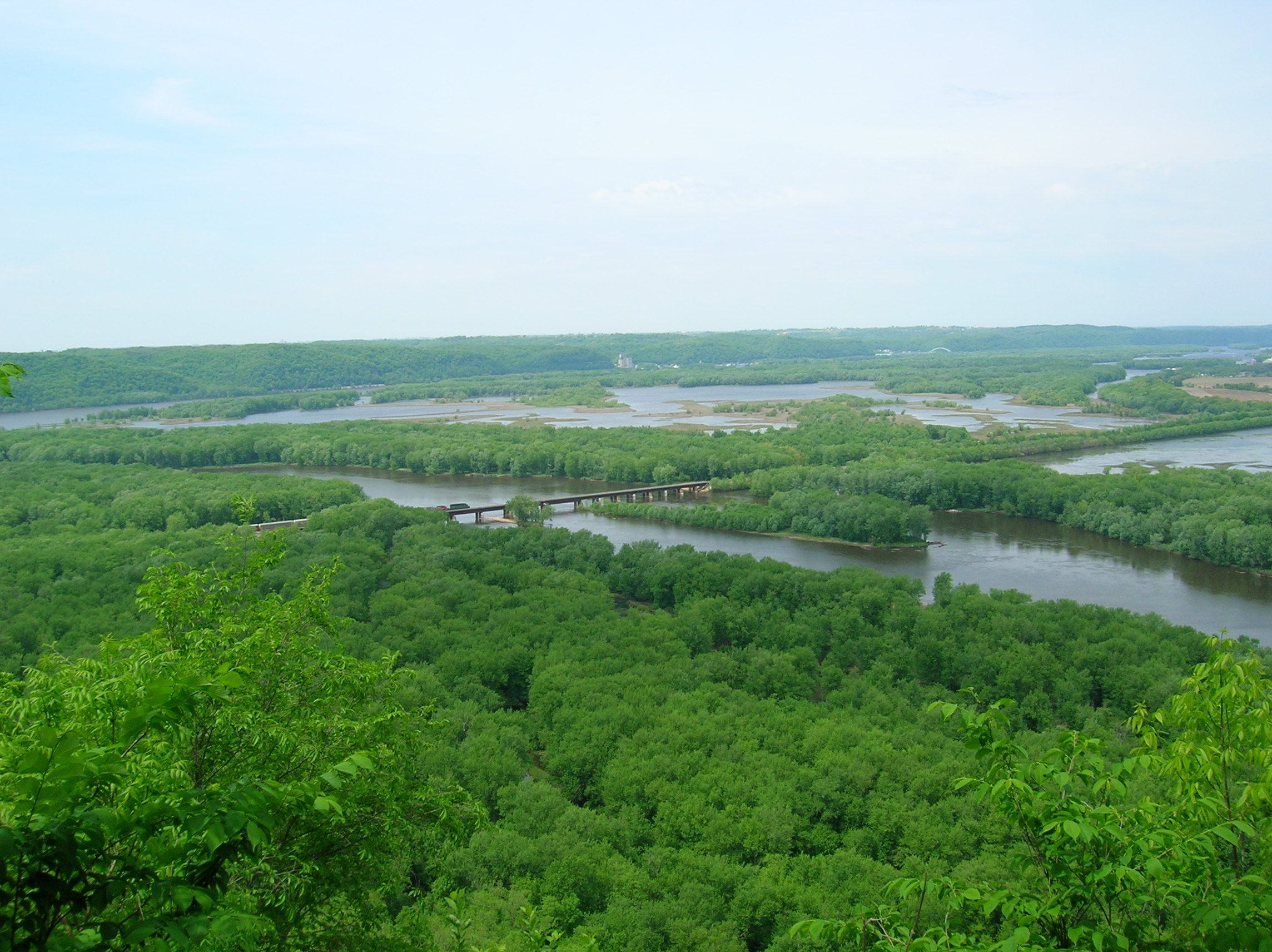
Delta at the Mississippi River, seen from Wyalusing State Park

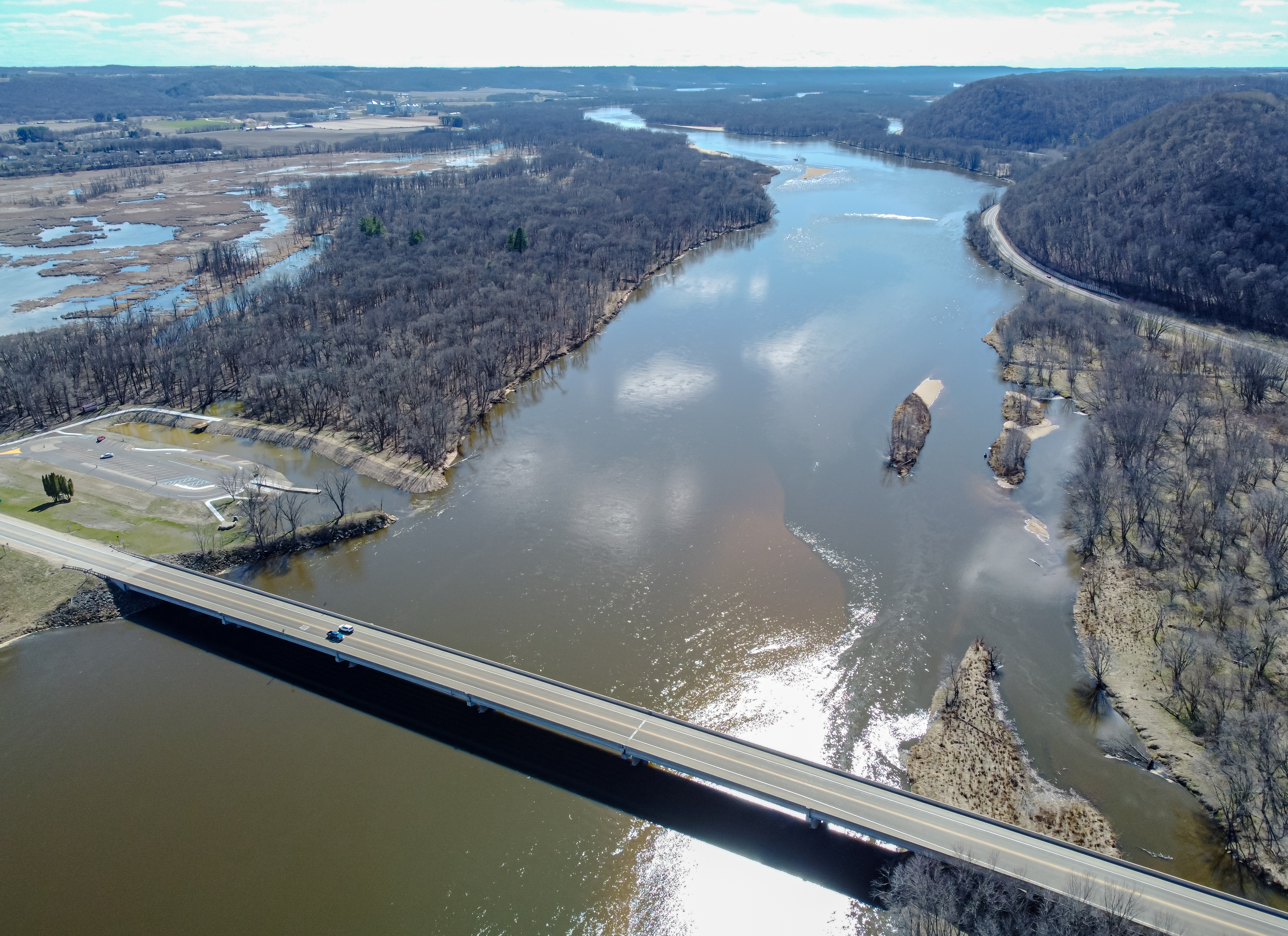
Wisconsin River north of Boscobel with US-61 bridge over river

== See also ==
- List of Wisconsin rivers
