= March Rapids, Wisconsin =

Unincorporated community in Wisconsin, United States

- Unincorporated community
- Location within Wisconsin Location within the United States
- Coordinates: 44°50′40″N 90°09′00″W
- Country: United States
- State: Wisconsin
- County: Marathon
- Elevation: 1,280 ft (390 m)
- Time zone: UTC-6 (Central (CST))
  - Summer (DST): UTC-5 (CDT)
- Area codes: 715 & 534
- GNIS feature ID: 1569022

March Rapids is an unincorporated community located in the town of Eau Pleine, Marathon County, Wisconsin, United States.

== History ==
In 1877, J. B. Holmes and B. D. Holmes built a mill to saw lumber and shingles at the site of March Rapids on the Big Eau Pleine River in the pine forest of central Wisconsin. A village named Hope formed around the mill, with possibly 75 inhabitants.

In 1887 the mill was bought by Thomas March, who had grown up in New York and had run mills in nearby Spencer. In 1891 a logging railroad reached the town and began hauling out as many as five carloads of lumber a day. A post office was established with the name March. But a flood in December damaged the operation and in May the dam washed out, losing many sawlogs.

In late 1892 Thomas March sold the mill to Doud & Sons, a barrel-making enterprise with factories in Winona, Rudolph and Pittsville. They added machines to make staves and headings for barrels. By 1897 they were shipping most of the headings, staves and lumber to Superior, where Doud operated a barrel factory. The town grew to around 200 residents, with a general store, hotel, butcher, two saloons, shoemaker, blacksmith, dance hall, church and school.

In 1905 the Wisconsin Central Railroad decided to pull up the tracks that had carried out March Rapids' products, despite Doud's objections. Doud and Sons obtained two early tractors to tow wagons of lumber out to the railroad at Stratford. This worked well until 1911, when the bridge at Noisy Creek collapsed under the steam-pull tractor and two operators were killed.

In 1913 a disastrous fire destroyed the entire mill. Doud replaced it with a more modern mill with a band saw and electric lights. In 1914 Doud built its own railroad from March Rapids five miles to Staadt to haul out logs.

But the timber ran out. The mills shut down. In 1921 the population was down to 100. Today all that remains of Marsh Rapids is a park where County P crosses the Big Eau Pleine River, with a picnic area and a historical marker.
