= Peter B. Champagne =

American businessman and politician

Peter B. Champagne (December 6, 1845 – July 1, 1891) was an American businessman and politician.

== Early life ==
Born Pierre Beaugrand dit Champagne in Saint-Félix-de-Valois, Quebec, son of Narcisse Beaugrand dit Champagne and Émilie Contré, Champagne settled in Wisconsin Rapids, Wisconsin, in 1863 and was in the logging business. In 1880, Champagne helped start a saw mill at Grandfather Falls and also started a mercantile store in Wausau, Wisconsin. In 1880, Champagne moved to Jenny Bull Falls, Wisconsin, and opened a store. He founded a railway and a lumber business.

== Government career ==
He served on the Lincoln County, Wisconsin, Board of Supervisors. He served as village president and then on the common council when Jenny Bulls Falls became a city. In 1883, Champagne served in the Wisconsin State Assembly and was a Republican. He died in Merrill, Wisconsin.
