= Eau Pleine, Marathon County, Wisconsin =

Town of Eau Pleine
- Town
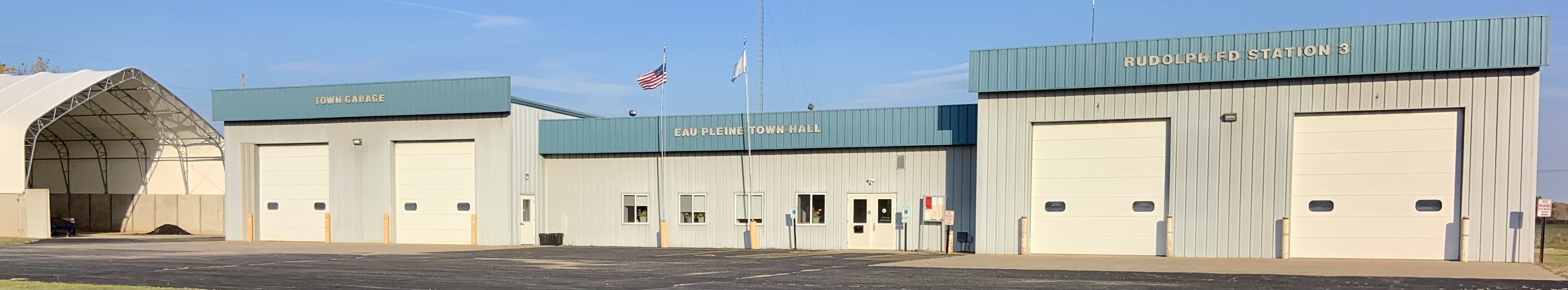
- Town hall

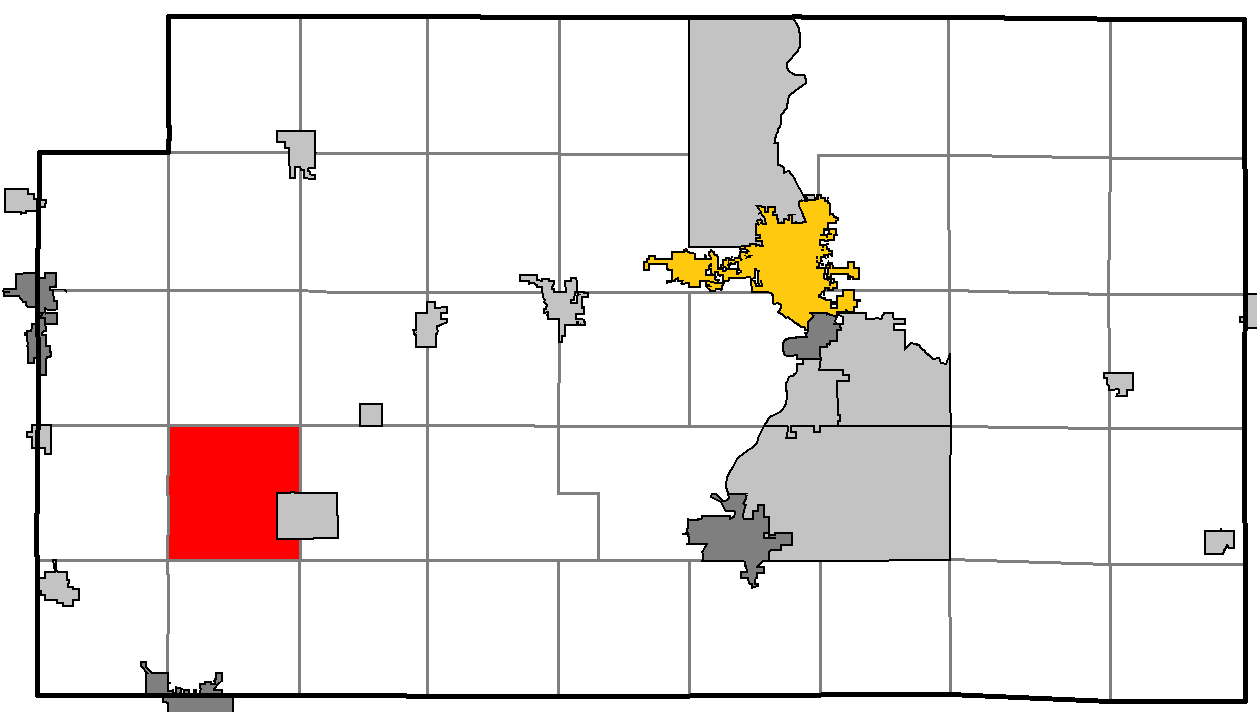
- Location of Eau Pleine, Marathon County

- Location of Marathon County, Wisconsin
- Coordinates: 44°48′50″N 90°8′2″W
- Country: United States
- State: Wisconsin
- County: Marathon

Area
  - Total: 33.2 sq mi (86.1 km^{2})
  - Land: 33.2 sq mi (86.1 km^{2})
  - Water: 0 sq mi (0.0 km^{2})
- Elevation: 1,306 ft (398 m)

Population (2020)
  - Total: 769
  - Density: 23.1/sq mi (8.93/km^{2})
- Time zone: UTC-6 (Central (CST))
  - Summer (DST): UTC-5 (CDT)
- Area codes: 715 & 534
- FIPS code: 55-22425
- GNIS feature ID: 1583127
- PLSS township: T27N R3E
- Website: https://townofeaupleinemc.org/home

Eau Pleine is a town in Marathon County, Wisconsin, United States. It is part of the Wausau, WI Metropolitan Statistical Area. The population was 769 at the 2020 census. The unincorporated communities of Little Rose, and Weber are located in the town. The ghost towns of Staadts and March Rapids were also located in the town.

== History ==
The outline of the six-mile square that would become the Town of Eau Pleine was first surveyed in September 1851 by a crew working for the U.S. government. In September 1853 another crew marked its section corners, walking through the woods and wading the streams, measuring with chain and compass. When done, the deputy surveyor filed this general description:

The greater portion of the surface of this township is gently rolling, the ballance is flat level land with but little swamp. The soil is 2nd and 3rd rate with a hard clay and gravel Subsoil. The township is timbered all over with Hemlock Birch Elm Linde Sugar Black Oak White and Black Ash Maple Ironwoods and some Pine. The Big Eau Plaine creek runs in a Southeasterly direction through the North part of the township, entering it on Section 5 and leaveing it on Section 13: the Eau Plaine is quite crooked and very irregular in width. The current is generally quick, with frequent small rapids, and a hard bottom of stone and gravel. The banks are generally dry, the bottom land is very uneven and subject to frequent inundation. The small streams run into the Big Eau Plaine: they have mostly a quick current, a hard gravel bottom and low banks covered with Alders.

The name Eau Pleine is derived from the French phrase meaning "full water" or "stock river".

== Geography ==
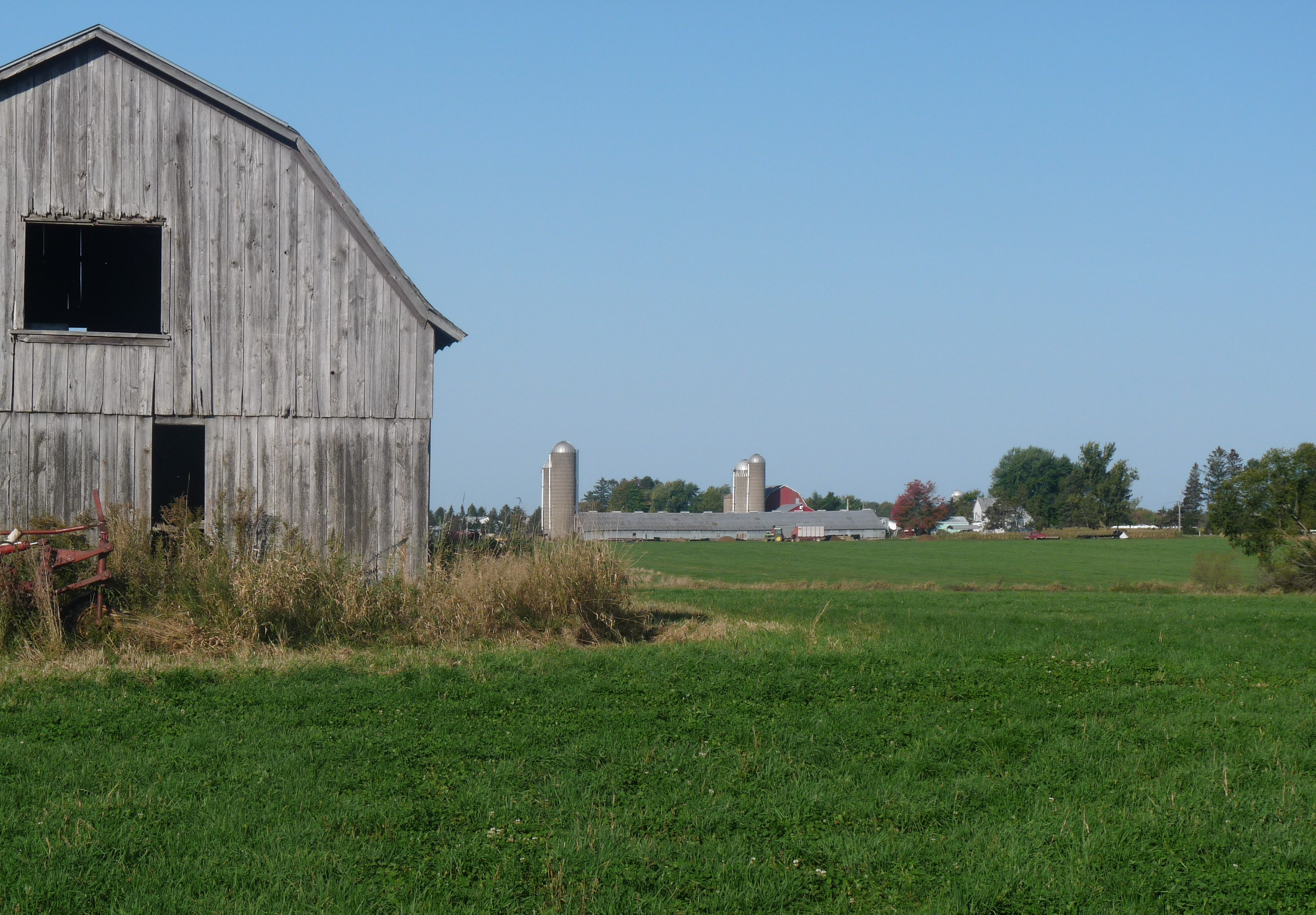
Much of Eau Pleine is flattish farmland, except where the river and streams have cut through.

According to the United States Census Bureau, the town has a total area of 33.2 square miles (86 km^{2}), of which 33.2 square miles (86 km^{2}) is land and 0.03% is water.

== Demographics ==
As of the census of 2000, there were 750 people, 275 households, and 221 families residing in the town. The population density was 22.6 people per square mile (8.7/km^{2}). There were 278 housing units at an average density of 8.4 per square mile (3.2/km^{2}). The racial makeup of the town was 99.20% White, 0.27% Asian, 0.13% from other races, and 0.40% from two or more races. Hispanic or Latino of any race were 0.27% of the population.

There were 275 households, out of which 38.2% had children under the age of 18 living with them, 70.2% were married couples living together, 4.0% had a female householder with no husband present, and 19.3% were non-families. 17.8% of all households were made up of individuals, and 7.6% had someone living alone who was 65 years of age or older. The average household size was 2.73 and the average family size was 3.07.

The population was 27.6% under the age of 18, 6.4% from 18 to 24, 31.3% from 25 to 44, 21.9% from 45 to 64, and 12.8% who were 65 years of age or older. The median age was 36 years. For every 100 females, there were 106.0 males. For every 100 females age 18 and over, there were 107.3 males.

The median income for a household in the town was $41,875, and the median income for a family was $44,861. Males had a median income of $30,735 versus $21,389 for females. The per capita income for the town was $18,052. About 4.2% of families and 4.9% of the population were below the poverty line, including 6.4% of those under age 18 and 10.1% of those age 65 or over.
