= Don C. Hall =

American politician

Don Carlos Hall II (March 6, 1867 – October 24, 1953) was an American actor and politician.

Born in the town of Eau Pleine, Portage County, Wisconsin, Hall went to the Eau Pleine public school and the Stevens Point High School in Stevens Point, Wisconsin. Hall was the head of the Don C. Hall Theatrical Company and toured the United States with his wife Clara performing plays. In 1913, Hall served in the Wisconsin State Assembly and was a Republican. From 1923 until his wife's death in 1951, the Halls lived in Mokena, Illinois. Hall died at the Lincoln Nursing Home in Joliet, Illinois.
