= Eau Pleine, Portage County, Wisconsin =

Eau Pleine
- Town
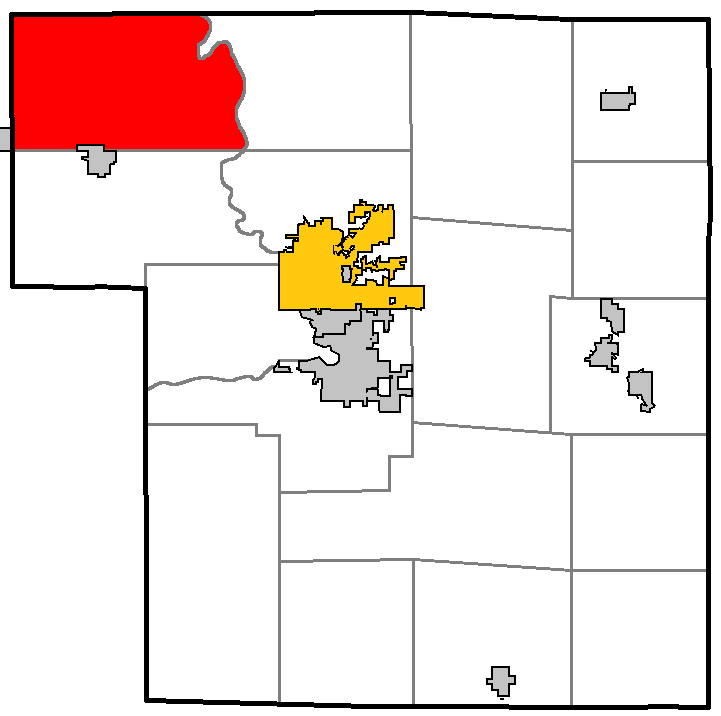
- Location of Eau Pleine, Portage County

- Location of Portage County, Wisconsin
- Coordinates: 44°38′38″N 89°43′37″W
- Country: United States
- State: Wisconsin
- County: Portage

Area
  - Total: 57.7 sq mi (149.5 km^{2})
  - Land: 55.5 sq mi (143.7 km^{2})
  - Water: 2.3 sq mi (5.9 km^{2})
- Elevation: 1,165 ft (355 m)

Population (2020)
  - Total: 1,063
  - Density: 19.16/sq mi (7.397/km^{2})
- Time zone: UTC-6 (Central (CST))
  - Summer (DST): UTC-5 (CDT)
- Area codes: 715 & 534
- FIPS code: 55-22450
- GNIS feature ID: 1583128
- Website: https://townofeaupleine.com/

Eau Pleine (French pronunciation: [o plɛn]) is a town in Portage County, Wisconsin, United States. The population was 1,063 at the 2020 census.

== History ==
The town of Eau Pleine was founded in 1852, and named after the Little Eau Pleine River. Eau Pleine is derived from the French phrase meaning "full water" or "stock river".

== Geography ==
According to the United States Census Bureau, the town has a total area of 57.7 square miles (149.5 km^{2}), of which 55.5 square miles (143.7 km^{2}) is land and 2.3 square miles (5.9 km^{2}) (3.92%) is water.

== Demographics ==
As of the census of 2000, there were 931 people, 344 households, and 266 families residing in the town. The population density was 16.8 people per square mile (6.5/km^{2}). There were 402 housing units at an average density of 7.2 per square mile (2.8/km^{2}). The racial makeup of the town was 98.17% White, 0.21% African American, 0.11% Native American, 0.86% Asian, 0.54% from other races, and 0.11% from two or more races. Hispanic or Latino of any race were 0.86% of the population.

There were 344 households, out of which 32.3% had children under the age of 18 living with them, 69.5% were married couples living together, 3.8% had a female householder with no husband present, and 22.4% were non-families. 18.0% of all households were made up of individuals, and 9.6% had someone living alone who was 65 years of age or older. The average household size was 2.71 and the average family size was 3.07.

In the town, the population was spread out, with 26.5% under the age of 18, 6.3% from 18 to 24, 28.5% from 25 to 44, 24.4% from 45 to 64, and 14.3% who were 65 years of age or older. The median age was 39 years. For every 100 females, there were 109.7 males. For every 100 females age 18 and over, there were 114.4 males.

The median income for a household in the town was $49,167, and the median income for a family was $51,650. Males had a median income of $33,750 versus $25,078 for females. The per capita income for the town was $20,301. About 3.7% of families and 4.8% of the population were below the poverty line, including 3.8% of those under age 18 and 6.6% of those age 65 or over.

== Notable people ==
- Don C. Hall, stage actor and Wisconsin State Representative, was born in the town
