= Dancy, Wisconsin =

Unincorporated community in Wisconsin, United States

- Unincorporated community
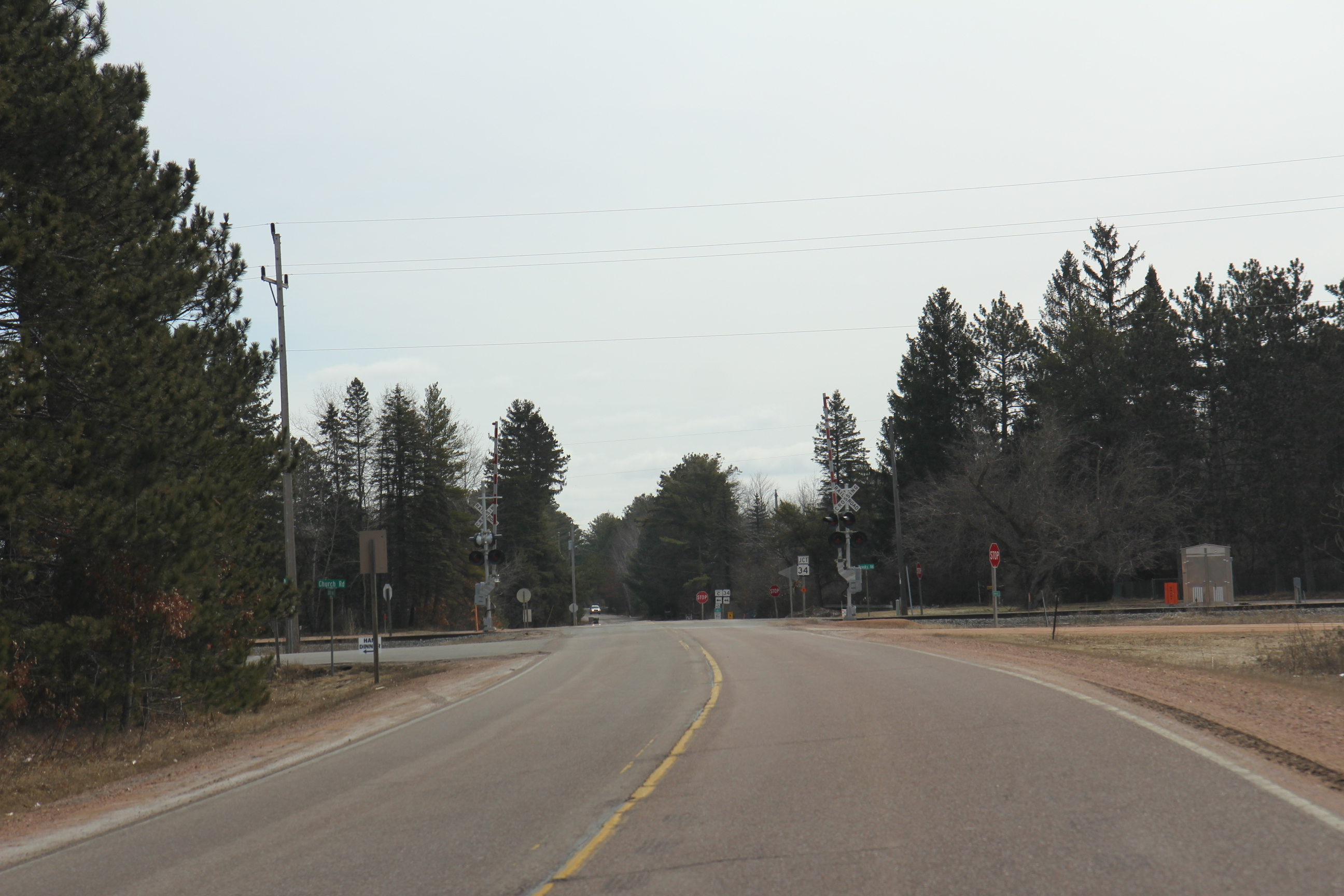
- Looking east in Dancy on County Highway C

- Location within Wisconsin Location within the United States
- Coordinates: 44°41′16″N 89°42′47″W
- Country: United States
- State: Wisconsin
- County: Marathon
- Elevation: 1,129 ft (344 m)
- Time zone: UTC-6 (Central (CST))
  - Summer (DST): UTC-5 (CDT)
- Area codes: 715 and 534
- GNIS feature ID: 1563694

Dancy (also Hutchinson Station, Juleson) is an unincorporated community located in the town of Knowlton, Marathon County, Wisconsin, United States.

== History ==
Originally known as Hutchinson for its first postmaster, the name was changed in the 1880s to honor Thorton Dancy, a superintendent for the Chicago, Milwaukee & St. Paul Railroad.
