= Knowlton (CDP), Wisconsin =

Census-designated place in Wisconsin, United States

Knowlton, Wisconsin
- Census-designated place
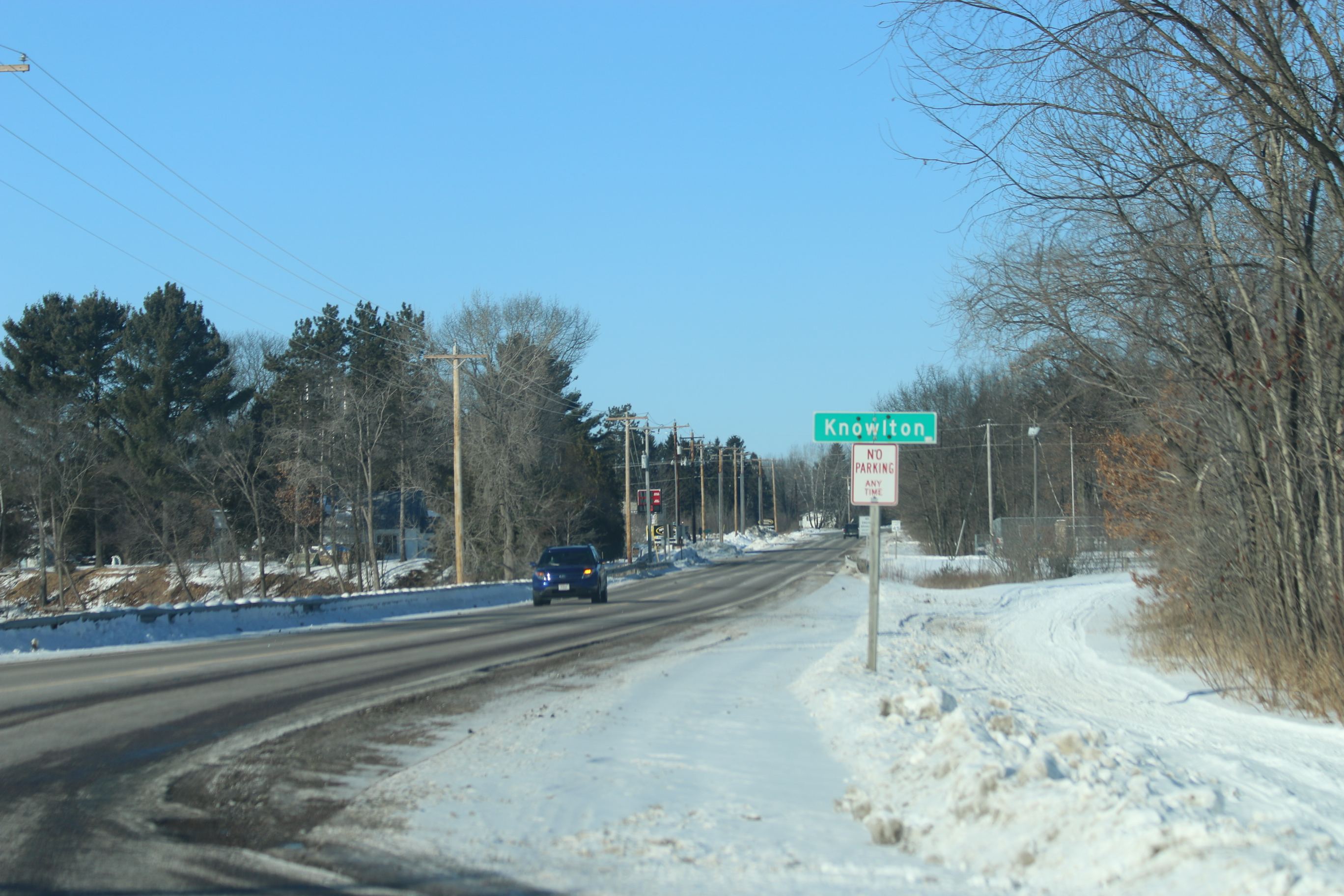
- Looking north at the sign for Knowlton on County DB

- Location within Wisconsin
- Coordinates: 44°42′59″N 89°40′57″W
- Country: United States
- State: Wisconsin
- County: Marathon

Area
  - Total: 1.406 sq mi (3.64 km^{2})
  - Land: 1.000 sq mi (2.59 km^{2})
  - Water: 0.406 sq mi (1.05 km^{2})
- Elevation: 1,115 ft (340 m)

Population (2020)
  - Total: 94
  - Density: 94/sq mi (36/km^{2})
- Time zone: UTC-6 (Central (CST))
  - Summer (DST): UTC-5 (CDT)
- Area codes: 715 & 534
- GNIS feature ID: 1567581

Knowlton is a census-designated place in the town of Knowlton, Marathon County, Wisconsin, United States. Its population was 94 at the 2020 census, down from 120 as of the 2010 census. The northern terminus for Wisconsin Highway 34 is located just north of Knowlton and the highway passes through the community.

== Images ==
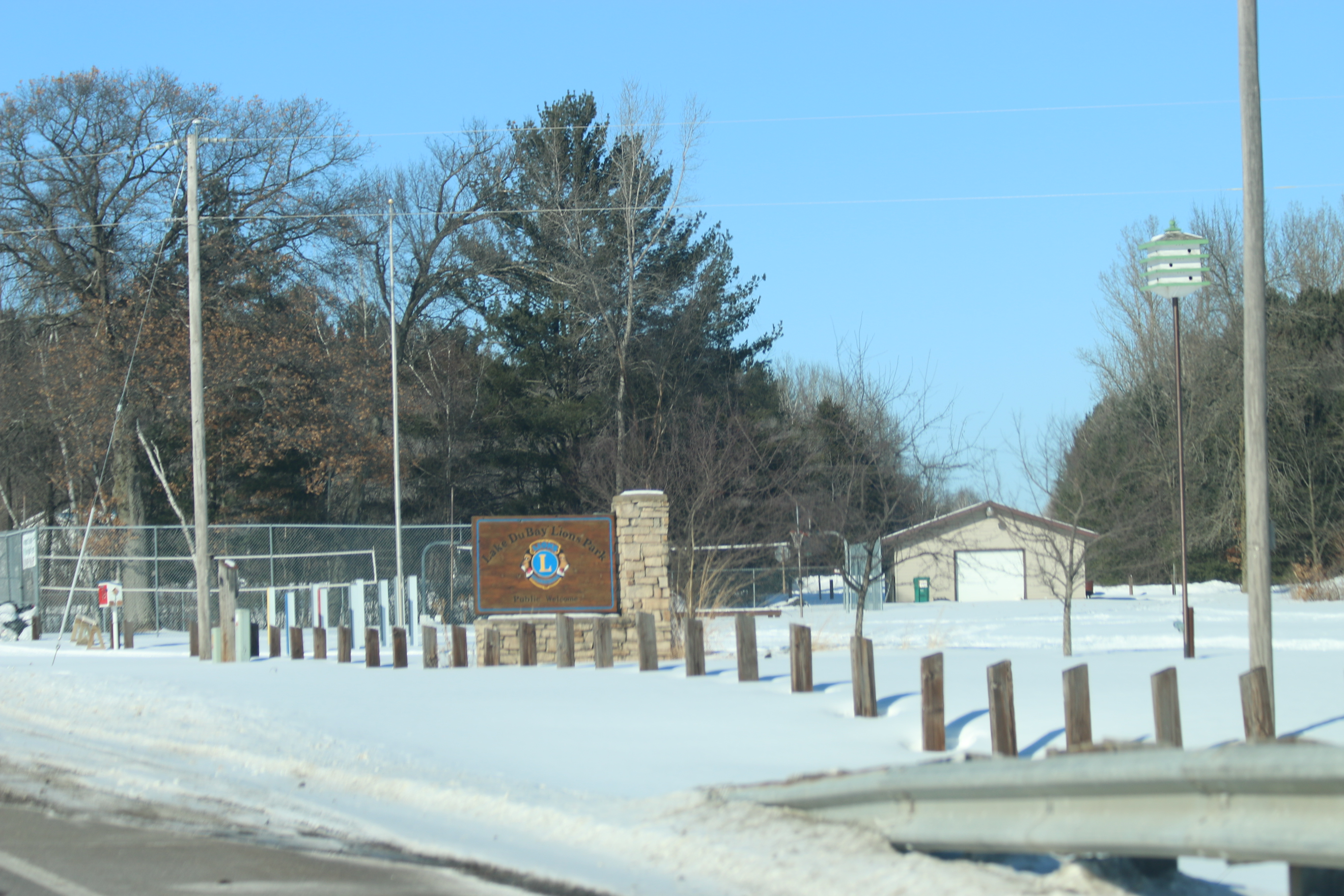
Lake DuBay Lions Park at Knowlton

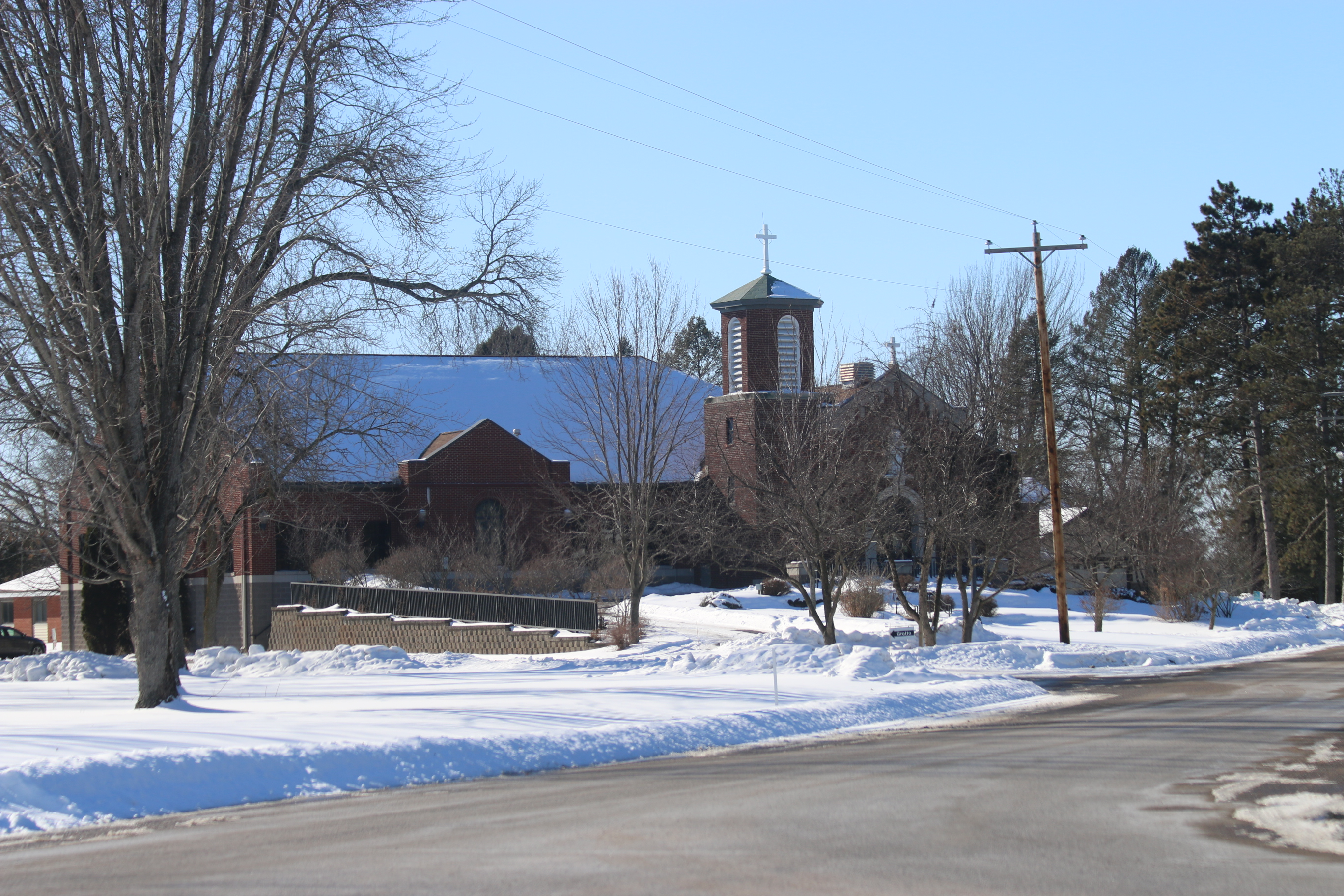
St. Francis Xavier Catholic Church at Knowlton
