= United States v. DuBay =

- Court: Court of Military Appeals
- Decided: July 21, 1967
- Citation: 17 C.M.A. 147, 37 C.M.R 411 (C.M.A. 1967)

United States v. DuBay, 17 C.M.A. 147, 37 C.M.R 411 (C.M.A. 1967), was a United States case decided by the Court of Military Appeals that established procedure in courts-martial for holding hearings to determine issues raised collaterally which require findings of fact and conclusions of law. Such hearings are commonly referred to as "DuBay hearings", and the case is cited in the rules of the Court of Appeals for the Armed Forces.

The case centered around the commander of Fort Leonard Wood, Missouri, and his staff judge advocate. The two disagreed on the role of the president of the court-martial and the military judge. The litigation would grow to encompass over 100 cases. (Note: United States v. Scott, No. 415325 (A.B.R. Apr. 7, 1967) and United States v. Farmer, No. 415214 (A.B.R. Apr. 18, 1967) United States v. Baxter No. 415530 (A.B.R. Apr. 21, 1967); United States v. Johnson, No. 415354 (A.B.R. Apr. 18, 1967); United States v. Buchanan, No. 415138 (A.B.R. Apr. 7, 1967); United States v. Richmire, No. 414957 (A.B.R. Apr. 7, 1967); United States v. Jones, No. 414896 (A.B.R. Mar. 17, 1967); United States v. Tell, No. 414862 (A.B.R. Mar. 17, 1967)) From 1966 to 1968, the DuBay cases were held. One of the cases, a court-martial of a Private DuBay would become the title case of the lawsuit.

== Case ==
United States v. Phenix was the first of the DuBay cases to be filed, in August 1966. Phenix, a court-martial, was complicated by the fact that the convening order listed a separate category of 'President' when listing the court-martial personnel. Additionally, the convening order specified a specific person as president, rather than the customary oldest member of the martial being president. The order also gave the president the ability to call a case at his discretion, rather than requiring the president to consult with the law officer before.

While Phenix was still being litigated, many cases with similar convening orders were filed from Fort Leonard Wood. These included United States v. DuBay, and United States v. Berry. (Note: DuBay had been convicted of absence without leave and several other offences. The sentence included a dishonorable discharge and imprisonment for eighteen months. The court, in taking action on the case, changed the dishonorable discharge to a bad-conduct discharge, and approved the imprisonment.) The defending counsel in many of these cases filed an assignment of errors, upon which the Board of Review deemed there to be "little or no evidence" as to the significance of the errors. The board then returned the trial record to the Judge Advocate General of the Armed Forces without deciding on the case. The board requested that the Judge Advocate General investigate the discrepancy. Brian Duncan, Judge Advocate General at the time sent the case back, arguing that the Board must consider the governments response to the assignment. Duncan repeatedly refused to cooperate, and, in March 1967, the board reached a decision.

The board decided that a fact finding hearing must be held, but that the board lacked the authority to hold such a review. They reached the conclusion that there was no precedent for the unusual convening order structure.

An examination of the record before us, together with a limited consideration of the affidavits offered by the government, convinces us that the issues are real and warrant a hearing on the matter where sworn testimony can be taken, with each party enjoying the right of cross- examination in matters which are largely subjective in nature and exclusively within the personal knowledge of the respective witnesses.

— Army Board of Review, United States v. DuBay

After the decision, an affidavit from James C. Starr was secured, and the Board of Review was requested to reconsider its decision. On April 24, 1967, a panel of the Board rehearing a similar case, United States V. Moore reached the opposite decision. The cases were appealed to the Court of Military Appeals. In accepting the case, the court wrote "If this cause is not heard during the present term, and an orderly disposition made of the question of unlawful command influence at Fort Leonard Wood, disruption of chaotic proportions will be visited upon ... the orderly administration of military justice in the Army." The case received significant media attention, being covered in The New York Times, The Washington Post, and others. During the trial, other information came to light, including an alleged attempt of the commander of Fort Leonard Wood to influence the decision of various court martial.

On July 21, 1967, the court decided on the case in a per curiam decision. In the decision, which did not deal with findings and sentencing, established a procedure for limited evidentiary hearings, which would become known as 'Dubay Hearings'.

== Significance ==
DuBay Hearings were first implemented by Kenneth J. Hodson, in a fact-finding investigation mandated by the court as a follow-up to its decision in DuBay. The Law Officer found that the commander at Fort Leonard Wood did not "exercise unlawful command influence in any case during the time he was at Fort Leonard." The case led to the remaining 93 pending similar cases having the same decisions. In reporting on the action, the New York Times wrote that a "Pentagon spokesman said it was the largest number of trials that had been declared prejudiced by the actions of a single commander" since enactment of the Uniform Code of Military Justice.

In 1968, the Military Justice Act of 1968 was passed, amending the Uniform Code of Military Justice. It was in part built on the decisions in DuBay.
