= Staadts, Wisconsin =

- Ghost town
- Location within Wisconsin
- Coordinates: 44°46′45″N 90°07′12″W
- Country: United States
- State: Wisconsin
- County: Marathon
- Elevation: 1,319 ft (402 m)
- GNIS feature ID: 1876741

Staadts is a ghost town, in the town of Eau Pleine, Marathon County, Wisconsin, United States. Staadts was 2.5 miles (4.0 km) southwest of Stratford. The town was marked on USGS maps as late as 1953.
