= John Baptiste DuBay =

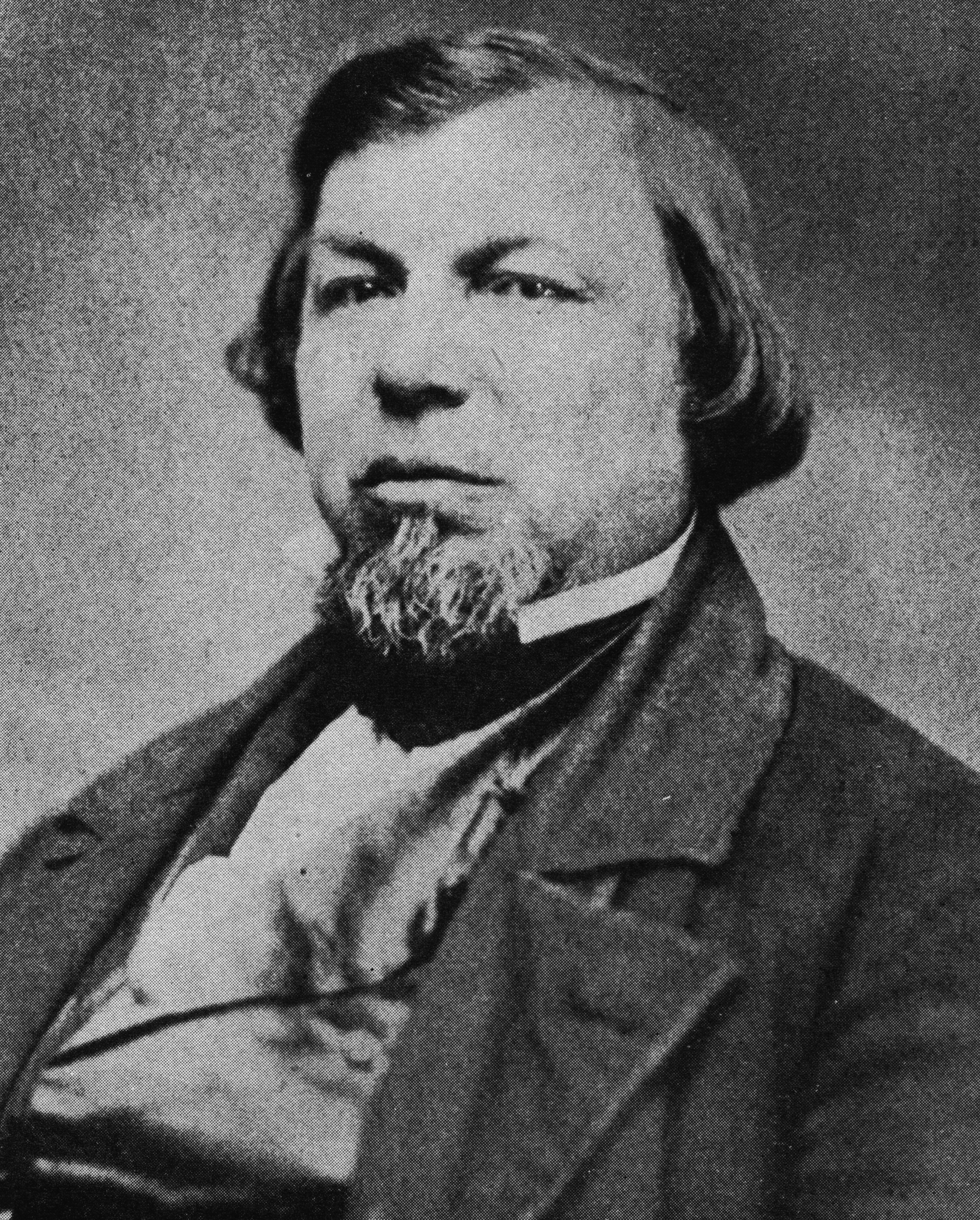
- Born: July 10, 1810; Green Bay, Illinois Territory
- Died: January 11, 1887 (aged 76); Knowlton, Wisconsin
- Other names: John Dubé, John Du Bay
- Occupations: Fur trader, general merchant, government interpreter
- Known for: Acquittal in sensational 1857 murder trial

John Baptiste DuBay (July 10, 1810 – January 11, 1887) was a pioneer fur trader throughout the upper Midwest, primarily in Wisconsin. He was very successful in several of his endeavors. However, in 1857 he was accused of the murder of a mill owner in Portage, Wisconsin. Despite two mistrials and an aborted third trial he was not convicted. Nevertheless, the experience left him financially ruined.

DuBay was illiterate and signed documents with an X. By others his name was variously spelled Dubé, Du Bay, and Dubay.

== Saginaw and Sault Ste. Marie ==
DuBay was born on 10 July 1810 in Green Bay, Illinois Territory, the son of a French trader and a Menominee Indian. At the age of 15, he started working for the sutler at Fort Detroit, and shortly thereafter began working for the American Fur Company in Saginaw. He eventually struck out on his own, and became so successful that the Company bought him out so as to eliminate competition. He then moved to Sault Ste. Marie, where he continued in independent trade.

Dubay Street in Waterford Village, Michigan is named for him, as he spent much time in the village while traveling along the Saginaw Trail through Michigan.

== Rehired by American Fur Company, government interpreter ==
In about 1830, he was re-hired by the American Fur Company as an agent. Eventually he was appointed primary agent at the Ojibwe settlement of Lac du Flambeau. In about 1834, while still employed by the American Fur Company, he established a trading post on the Wisconsin River near present day Knowlton, Wisconsin. The homestead was located in the modern town of Dewey, at the far north edge of Portage County. He claimed it was the place where his father spent a winter in temporary trading quarters.

In 1840 he was appointed Indian agent at Fort Winnebago, at the portage between the Fox and Wisconsin river valleys, and he operated a grocery there.

The Knowlton homestead was his primary home for the rest of his life, although he frequently traveled back to Fort Winnebago on business. During this period, aside from the trading post, DuBay engaged in several other enterprises, including running a stage line from Portage to Stevens Point. The Knowlton site, known as DuBay's Point or DuBay's Crossing, is now inundated by Lake DuBay.

Despite being illiterate, DuBay knew four Indian languages, and at various points during this period he was employed in treaty negotiations, mostly in the employ of the government but sometimes by the Indians. He was the interpreter for Governor Dodge at the Treaty of St. Peters (1837).

== Murder in Portage ==
In 1857 while on business to Portage City (as Fort Winnebago became known as), he shot a man in a property dispute. It was a high-profile and sensational murder case. The news was reported as far away as New York in Horace Greeley's New York Tribune. The dispute involved the fact that the American Fur Company had established quarters which DuBay assumed gave him preemption rights. However, preemption could not be granted to business entities, only to individuals, and separately the title was acquired by a Mr. Nelson McNeal, who sold the property to the company of Reynolds & Craig. On the night of Saturday 15 August, DuBay and William Reynolds, one of the principals in Reynolds and Craig, had a confrontation. Accounts vary as to what happened next. The contemporaneous story in the New York Tribune (reprinting the Portage City Record) described it this way:

DuBay was in town and was intoxicated, it is said. During the day he told several that "he would shoot a man before night," that "he would learn the boys a lesson," and other expressions.... DuBay returned from the city, saw the building, took his ax, and commenced chopping it down.... [I]ntelligence was carried to Mr. Reynolds of what was going on, who hastened to the spot and called DuBay a scoundrel. DuBay went into the house, brought out a double-barreled shot-gun ... pointed at Reynolds [and shot him] just below his heart, and killed him almost instantly.

However, according to his obituary in the Milwaukee Sentinel in 1887:

One day on his return from a hunting expedition with a party of Milwaukee men, he found the frame of a mill was already erected within his enclosure. After supper, he proceeded to cut it down, and a moment after it fell, a mob of thirty men, headed by Reynolds appeared with axes. [DuBay] stood in the door with a double-barreled shot-gun. He pushed Reynolds away several times, but he at last seized a weapon and at the point of striking, DuBay fired, killing him instantly.

DuBay was arrested almost immediately by the sheriff, who then was confronted with an angry crowd who wanted to lynch DuBay. The sheriff and several other leading citizens were able to convince the crowd to let the law perform its justice, although according to the Sentinel account one of the citizens urging the immediate lynching was one "Judge Guppy."

The trial was moved to Madison, and DuBay was defended by the prominent lawyers Moses Strong and Harlow Orton. Three former Wisconsin governors — James Doty, Nelson Dewey and Henry Dodge — testified on his behalf, and twice the jury could not agree on a conviction. A third retrial attempt was made but the proceedings were eventually dropped.

== Later life in Knowlton ==
After the murder trial, DuBay went to his home in Knowlton. According to accounts at the time, he was remorseful over his role in the murder. He lived in poverty at his homestead, and in the last ten years of his life was under direct care of his children. He died there on January 11, 1887.

== Lake DuBay ==
Lake DuBay is an impoundment of the Wisconsin River north of Stevens Point. The water floods the location of DuBay's homestead. Prior to the dam being built in 1941, an excavation was performed at the homestead site. It was thought that relics and artifacts would be found relevant to the trading post, but as it turned out the site was the location of his home, not the business. Regardless, many artifacts were collected and are now preserved in the Milwaukee Public Museum.

== Other references ==
- Lewis, Franklin F (1919–1920). "The career of Edward F. Lewis". Wisconsin Magazine of History. 3 (4). State Historical Society of Wisconsin: 434–442.
- Sellery, G. C. (1946). "Book Notes: review of Dubay: Son-in-law of Oshkosh, by Merton. E Krug". Wisconsin Magazine of History. 29 (4). State Historical Society of Wisconsin: 461–463.
