= Knowlton, Wisconsin =

Town of Knowlton, Wisconsin
- Town
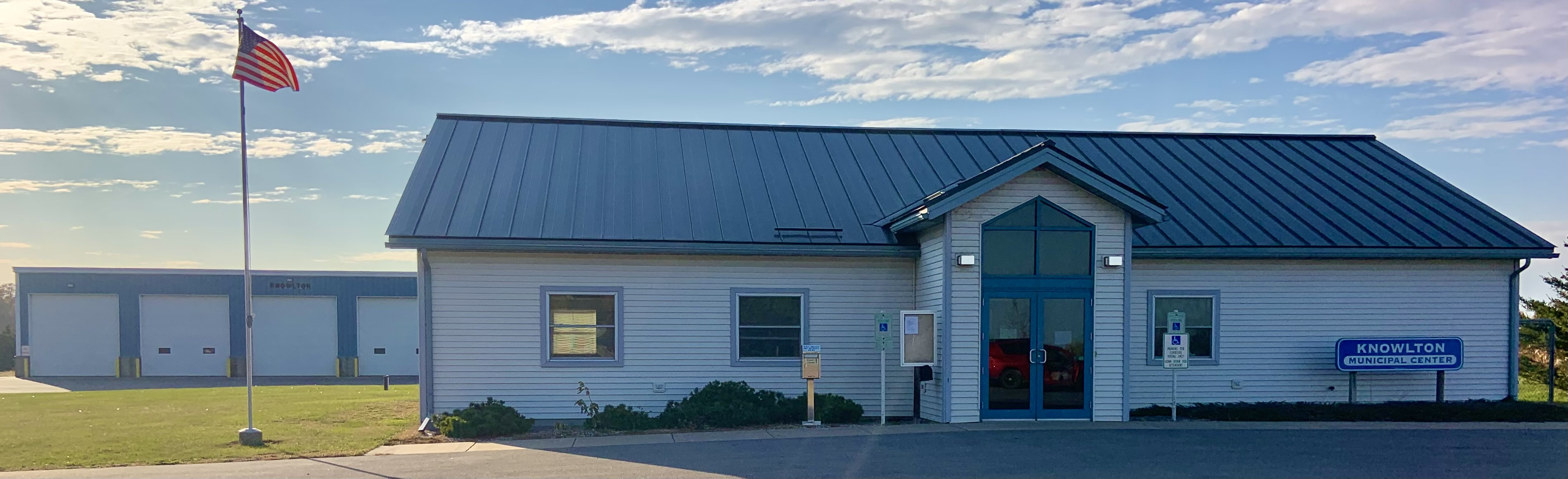
- Town hall

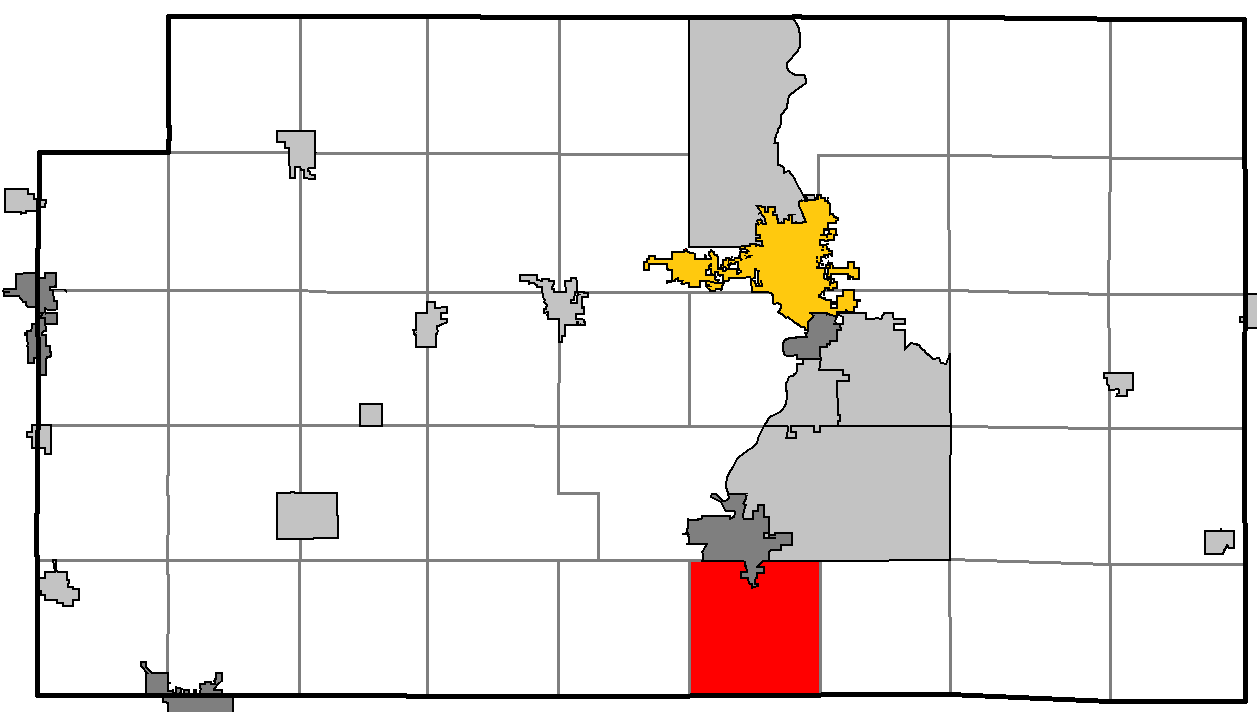
- Location of the Town of Knowlton, Marathon County

- Location of Marathon County, Wisconsin
- Coordinates: 44°43′1″N 89°40′47″W
- Country: United States
- State: Wisconsin
- County: Marathon

Area
  - Total: 34.2 sq mi (88.5 km^{2})
  - Land: 29.1 sq mi (75.4 km^{2})
  - Water: 5.1 sq mi (13.1 km^{2})
- Elevation: 1,125 ft (343 m)

Population (2020)
  - Total: 1,984
  - Density: 68.2/sq mi (26.3/km^{2})
- Time zone: UTC-6 (Central (CST))
  - Summer (DST): UTC-5 (CDT)
- Area codes: 715 & 534
- FIPS code: 55-40150
- GNIS feature ID: 1583490
- Website: http://townofknowltonwi.us/

Knowlton is a town in Marathon County, Wisconsin, United States. It is part of the Wausau, Wisconsin Metropolitan Statistical Area. The population was 1,984 at the 2020 census. The unincorporated communities of Dancy and Knowlton are located in the town. The unincorporated communities of Ashley and Rocky Corners are also located partially in the town. The town was created in 1859.

== Geography ==
According to the United States Census Bureau, the town has a total area of 34.2 square miles (88.5 km^{2}), of which 29.1 square miles (75.4 km^{2}) is land and 5.1 square miles (13.1 km^{2}), or 14.80%, is water.

== Demographics ==
At the 2000 census there were 1,688 people, 657 households, and 509 families in the town. The population density was 58.0 people per square mile (22.4/km^{2}). There were 757 housing units at an average density of 26.0 per square mile (10.0/km^{2}). The racial makeup of the town was 98.87% White, 0.12% African American, 0.18% Native American, 0.24% Asian, 0.06% Pacific Islander, 0.12% from other races, and 0.41% from two or more races. Hispanic or Latino of any race were 0.41%.

Of the 657 households 28.6% had children under the age of 18 living with them, 69.7% were married couples living together, 3.7% had a female householder with no husband present, and 22.4% were non-families. 16.9% of households were one person and 4.7% were one person aged 65 or older. The average household size was 2.57 and the average family size was 2.89.

The age distribution was 22.5% under the age of 18, 6.8% from 18 to 24, 32.8% from 25 to 44, 27.9% from 45 to 64, and 10.0% 65 or older. The median age was 39 years. For every 100 females, there were 110.0 males. For every 100 females age 18 and over, there were 112.5 males.

The median household income was $56,188 and the median family income was $59,231. Males had a median income of $39,583 versus $24,565 for females. The per capita income for the town was $24,149. About 1.9% of families and 3.1% of the population were below the poverty line, including none of those under age 18 and 10.1% of those age 65 or over.

== Notable people ==
- John Baptiste DuBay, fur trapper
- Bob Raczek, football coach
