= Big Eau Pleine River =

River in Wisconsin, United States

Coordinates: 44°44′53″N 89°42′57″W

The Big Eau Pleine River is a river in the U.S. state of Wisconsin. It is a tributary of the Wisconsin River as the Big Eau Pleine River originates in southern Taylor County near Stetsonville and flows into Marathon County. The Big Eau Pleine River flows by Stratford then to the large Big Eau Pleine Reservoir before it converges into the Wisconsin River at Lake DuBay. The Little Eau Pleine River, which flows from Clark County through Marathon County and into Portage County, is not a tributary of the Big Eau Pleine, although the Big and Little Eau Pleines are both tributaries of the Wisconsin River.

== Etymology ==
Eau Pleine is derived from the French phrase meaning "full water" or "stock river". In the Menominee language it is known as Sīpiah-Sōpomāhtek, which means "Soft Maple River".
