= Little Eau Pleine River =

River in Wisconsin, United States

Coordinates: 44°40′24″N 89°40′47″W

The Little Eau Pleine River is a river in the U.S. state of Wisconsin. It is a tributary of the Wisconsin River, as the Little Eau Pleine River originates near Unity, Wisconsin. It is also the subject of the traditional folk song "The Banks of the Little Eau Pleine," about a woman whose lover died as a raftsman on the Wisconsin river.

== Etymology ==
The Menominee name of the river is Manōmenāskon-Sipiah, "rice stalks river", referring to the importance of wild rice as a staple in the traditional Menominee and Ojibwe diets. The word "Little" is used to distinguish it from the larger Big Eau Pleine River, which is another tributary of the Wisconsin River.
