= Joseph L. Barber =

20th century American politician

Member of the Wisconsin Senate from the 25th district
- In office January 1, 1923 – January 3, 1927
- Preceded by: Claire B. Bird
- Succeeded by: Otto Mueller

Member of the Wisconsin State Assembly from the Marathon 1st district
- In office January 7, 1935 – January 2, 1939
- Preceded by: Frank J. Shortner
- Succeeded by: Anthony Gruszka
- In office January 7, 1929 – January 5, 1931
- Preceded by: Mathias J. Berres
- Succeeded by: Frank J. Shortner

Personal details
- Born: March 24, 1864 Charlestown, Wisconsin, U.S.
- Died: April 6, 1940 (aged 76)
- Resting place: Pine Grove Cemetery, Wausau, Wisconsin
- Party: Republican
- Spouses: Lucina Mae Fadner (m. 1885; died 1925); Ella Webb (m. 1899–1940)
- Children: with Lucina Fadner; Earl Fredrich Barber^{(b. 1886; died 1969)}; Gladys Rebecca (Small)^{(b. 1889; died 1982)}; with Ella Webb; Mildred Barber (Abel)^{(b. 1902; died 1976)}
- Profession: Physician, surgeon, pharmacist

Joseph Lanning Barber (March 24, 1864 – April 6, 1940) was an American medical doctor and a Republican politician from Marathon County, Wisconsin. He was a member of the Wisconsin Senate and State Assembly. His daughter, Mildred Barber Abel, was one of the first female members of the Wisconsin Legislature.

== Biography ==
Barber was born on March 24, 1864, in Hayton, Wisconsin. He attended the University of Illinois at Urbana-Champaign. In 1899, he married Ella Webb. Their daughter, Mildred Barber Abel, became a member of the Wisconsin State Assembly. It marked the first time a father and daughter served together in a state legislature in the history of the United States. Barber was a member of the Methodist Episcopal Church, as well as Modern Woodmen of America.

After Barber first began practicing medicine, he became Health Officer of Greenwood, Wisconsin, and Coroner of Clark County, Wisconsin, before moving to Collins, Wisconsin. He moved to Marathon City, Wisconsin, in 1906 and opened a practice and later a pharmacy.

After serving as President of Marathon, Wisconsin, Barber was elected to the Senate in 1922, where he served two terms. He was also a delegate to the 1920 Republican National Convention. Barber was first elected to the Assembly in 1925 and was re-elected in 1928 and 1934. He was a member of the Progressive Party. In addition, he was a member of the Marathon County, Wisconsin Board of Supervisors from 1924 to 1925 and again from 1931 to 1932.

He died at his home on April 6, 1940 and is buried in Wausau, Wisconsin.

Wisconsin State Assembly
Preceded by Mathias J. Berres	Member of the Wisconsin State Assembly from the Marathon 1st district January 7, 1929 – January 5, 1931	Succeeded by Frank J. Shortner
Preceded by Frank J. Shortner	Member of the Wisconsin State Assembly from the Marathon 1st district January 7, 1935 – January 2, 1939	Succeeded by Anthony Gruszka
Wisconsin Senate
Preceded by Claire B. Bird	Member of the Wisconsin Senate from the 25th district January 1, 1923 – January 3, 1927	Succeeded by Otto Mueller
