= Robert Schofield =

Robert Schofield may refer to:

- Robert Schofield (businessman), British business executive
- Robert M. Schofield, American physicist
- R. Harold A. Schofield, British medical missionary in China
- Bob Schofield, English footballer

== See also ==
- Robert Schofield House, Greenwood, Wisconsin
- Robert Schofield Morris, Canadian architect
