= Mildred Barber Abel =

20th century American politician

Member of the Wisconsin State Assembly from the Marathon 1st district
- In office January 5, 1925 – January 3, 1927
- Preceded by: John W. Salter
- Succeeded by: Mathias J. Berres

Personal details
- Born: Mildred Mary Francis Barber; January 9, 1902 Greenwood, Wisconsin, U.S.
- Died: September 29, 1976 (aged 74)
- Resting place: Pine Grove Cemetery, Wausau, Wisconsin
- Party: Progressive (1930s); Republican
- Spouse: Otto Abel (m. 1928; died 1965)
- Children: 2
- Parent: Joseph L. Barber (father)

Mildred Barber Abel (born Mildred Mary Francis Barber; January 9, 1902 – September 29, 1976) was an American progressive politician, and one of the first class of female members of the Wisconsin State Assembly. She represented western Marathon County in the 1925–1926 session. Her father, Joseph L. Barber, was also a member of the Wisconsin Legislature.

== Biography ==
Abel was born on January 9, 1902, in Greenwood, Wisconsin. Her father, Joseph L. Barber, was a member of the Assembly as well as the Wisconsin State Senate. They became the first father and daughter to serve together in a state legislature in the history of the United States. In 1928, she married Otto Abel. They had one son together in addition to a daughter from Otto Abel's first marriage. She died on September 29, 1976, and is buried in Wausau, Wisconsin.

== Career ==
Abel was elected to the Assembly in 1925. She was one of three women who were elected to the Assembly that year. They were the first women elected to the state legislature in the history of Wisconsin. She was a member of the Progressive Party.

Wisconsin State Assembly
| Preceded by John W. Salter | Member of the Wisconsin State Assembly from the Marathon 1st district January 5, 1925 – January 3, 1927 | Succeeded by Mathias J. Berres |
