= UC Riverside academics =

Public research university in Riverside, California

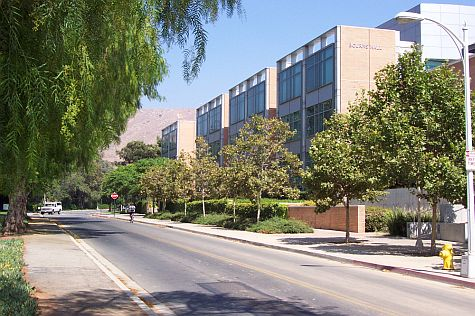
Bourns Hall

The University of California, Riverside is organized into three academic colleges, two professional schools, and two graduate schools. These units provide 81 majors and 52 minors, 48 master's degree programs, and 42 PhD programs. It is the only UC campus to offer undergraduate degrees in Creative Writing and Public Policy, and one of only three UCs (along with Berkeley and Irvine) to offer an undergraduate degree in Business Administration. Additionally, UCR's doctoral program in the emerging field of dance theory, founded in 1992, was the first program of its kind in the United States. UCR's various academic units are as follows:

- Bourns College of Engineering: The BCOE, which established in 1989, is named in honor of Marlan and Rosemary Bourns, founders of Bourns, Inc., an international electronics corporation, in recognition of a donation from the Bourns Foundation in 1994. The most popular majors are Mechanical Engineering (354 undergraduates), followed by Computer Science (217 undergraduates). The Department of Computer Science and Engineering owns the largest single Altix 4700 computer in the University of California system, powered by 64 Intel Itanium 2 processor cores and 128GB of system memory. According to Academic Analytics, BCOE faculty ranked 5th in Environmental Health Engineering in 2006.
- College of Humanities, Arts, and Social Sciences: CHASS can trace its history to the founding undergraduate institution at UCR, the College of Letters and Science, which first opened in 1954. The most popular majors are Psychology (1,045 undergraduates) and Business Administration (1,170 undergraduates). The Philosophical Gourmet Report ranked UCR's faculty in philosophy 38th in the nation and 40th in the English-speaking world, with the No. 1 program in philosophy of action.

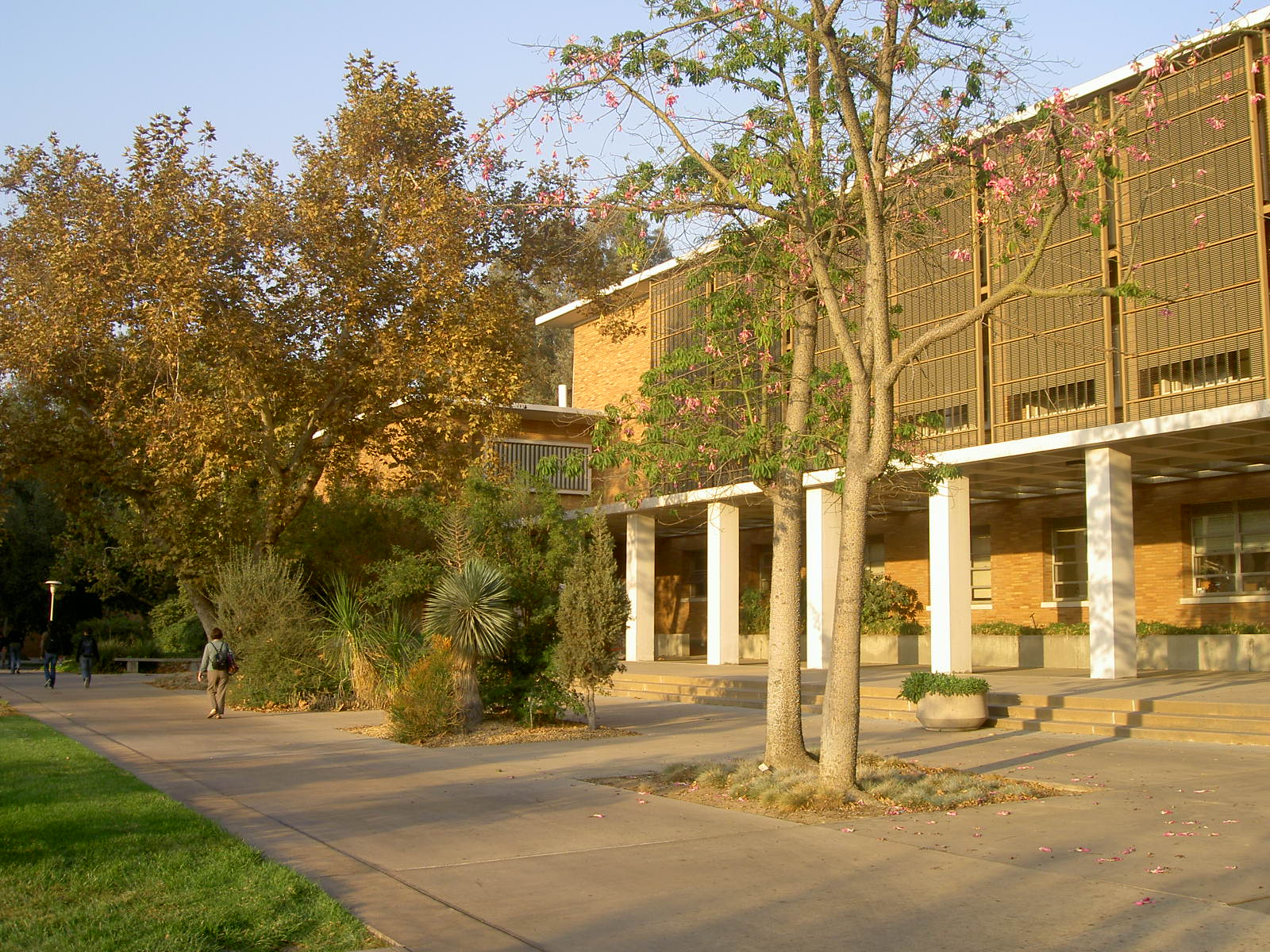
Webber Hall

- College of Natural and Agricultural Sciences: CNAS dates back to 1907 when the Citrus Experiment Station was founded at the base of Riverside's Mt. Rubidoux. In 1958, the College of Agriculture was formed as the first research oriented, degree granting institution at UCR. The most popular majors are Biological Chemistry (747 undergraduates), Biology (801.5 undergraduates) and an interdepartmental Biological Sciences program (1,206.5 undergraduates). According to the Faculty Scholarly Productivity Index published by Academic Analytics in 2006, CNAS faculty ranked 1st in soil science, 8th in Environmental Sciences, 10th in Plant Pathology, and 10th in Botany.
- Graduate School of Education: UCR's Graduate School of Education, which founded in 1968, enrolls over two hundred graduate students. Significant research centers include the California Educational Research Cooperative, a partnership between the School of Education and educators in local public school systems, and the Copernicus Project, dedicated to increasing the quality of science educators and education.
- School of Business: The School of Business, which established in 1970, offers graduate and undergraduate degrees in concentrations such as accounting, finance, management, and marketing. MBA, MPAc, and Master of Finance programs are under the A. Gary Anderson Graduate School of Management.
  - A. Gary Anderson Graduate School of Management: The origin of the AGSM can be traced back to 1970 when UC Riverside established the Graduate School of Administration. In 1994, the A. Gary Anderson Foundation endowed the school in exchange for naming rights. The AGSM currently enrolls 126 graduate students. Entrepreneur Magazine and The Princeton Review recently ranked the AGSM 23rd among the top 25 programs in entrepreneurship.
- School of Medicine: It established in 2008. The Division of Biomedical Sciences is an interdisciplinary division at UCR which administers a joint medical degree program with UCLA, the Thomas Haider program. The first two years of medical instruction are given on the UCR campus. Third- and fourth-year clerkships are served at UCLA and its affiliated medical centers. Students completing the program receive a Bachelor of Science degree in biomedical sciences from UCR and an M.D. degree from the David Geffen School of Medicine at UCLA. Up to 24 of each year's applicants are chosen to attend medical school at UCR and UCLA. The Division of Clinical Sciences houses the departments of family medicine, internal medicine, obstetrics/gynecology, pediatrics, and psychiatry/neuroscience.
- School of Public Policy: It established in 2015 and offers both undergraduate and graduate programs in public policy.
- UCR Extension: UCR Extension, which established in 1956, offers continuing education programs to approximately 30,000 students from San Bernardino, Riverside, Inyo and Eastern Los Angeles Counties every year. An additional 4,000 international students attend classes offered by UCR Extension's International Education Programs in Gangnam, Seoul, South Korea, and Beijing, China. The centers are run in partnership with local authorities and offer the same English language training programs as the main campus in Riverside. Students can transfer credits to UCR and are encouraged to continue their studies in California. UCR Extension also operates a "Global Nursing Review Program" that assists licensed nurses from other countries in gaining familiarity and proficiency with Western nursing practices, medical philosophy and culture.
