= Goodrich, Wisconsin =

- Town
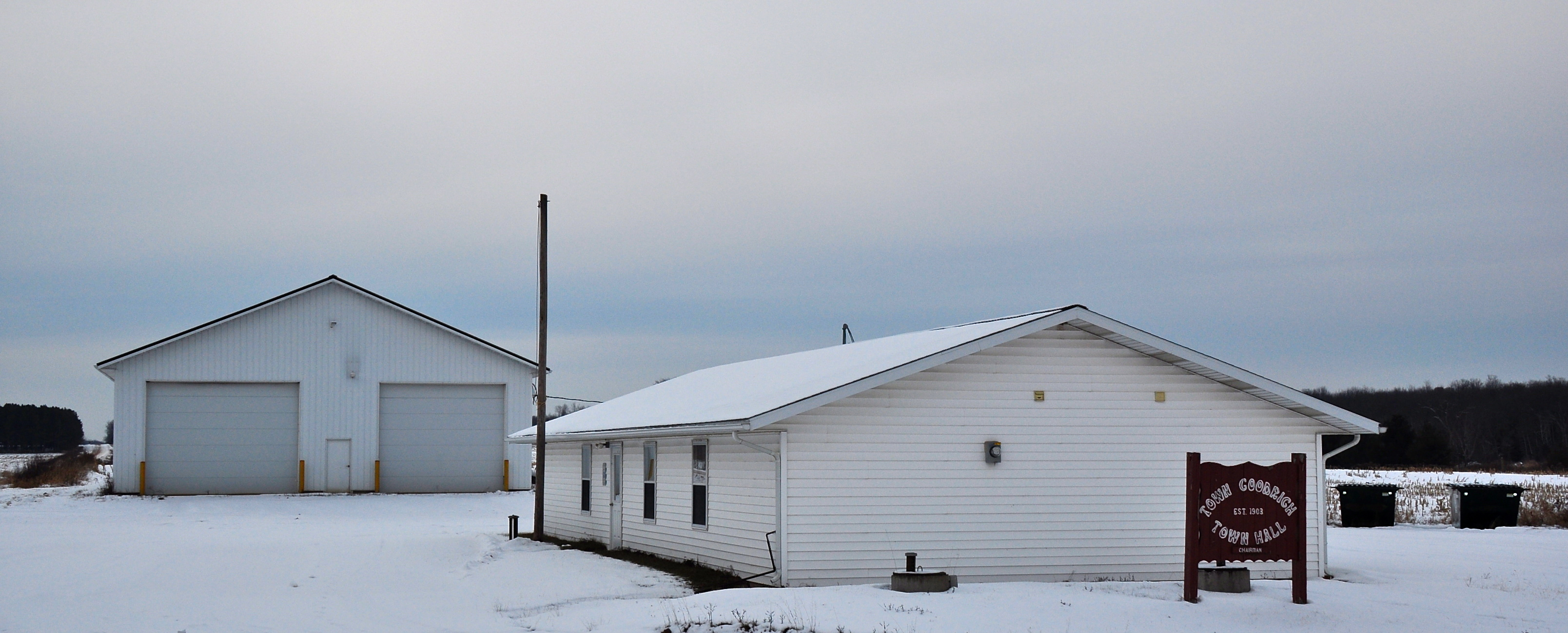
- Goodrich Town Hall in November 2013

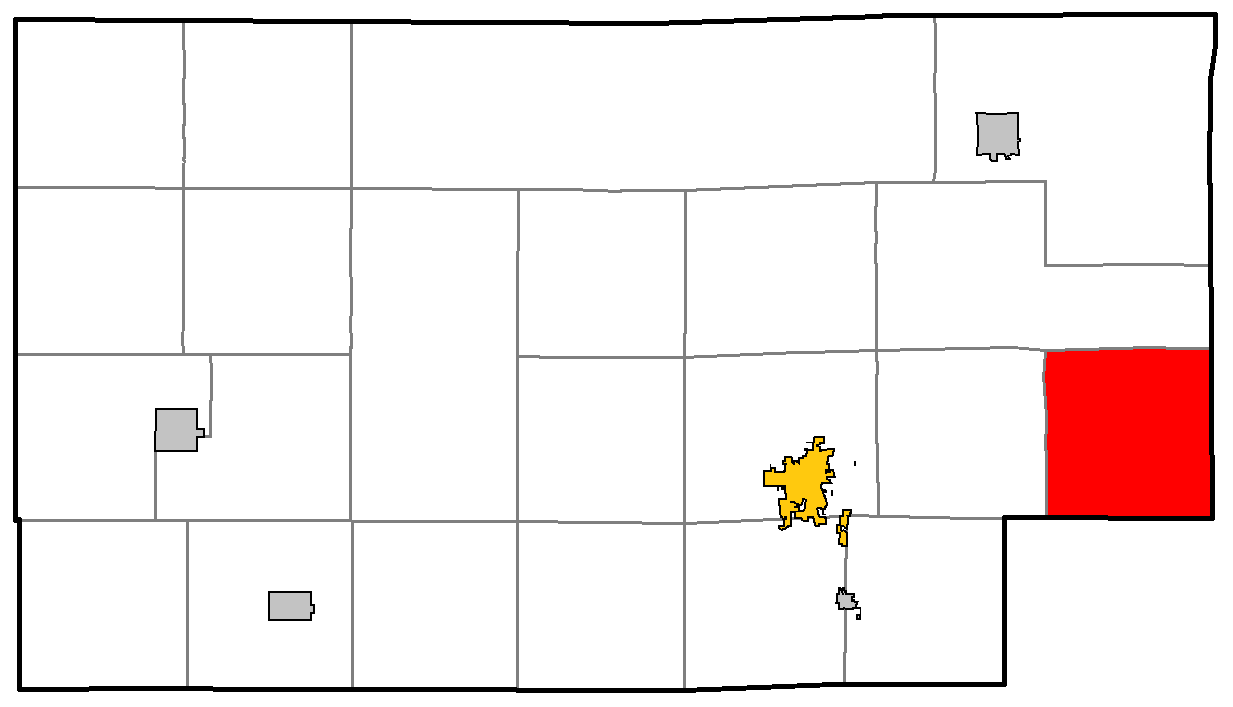
- Location of Goodrich, within Taylor County

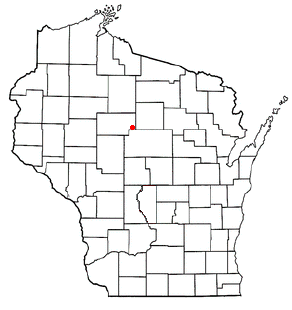
- Location of Goodrich, Wisconsin
- Coordinates: 45°9′24″N 90°5′44″W
- Country: United States
- State: Wisconsin
- County: Taylor

Area
  - Total: 36 sq mi (94 km^{2})
  - Land: 36 sq mi (94 km^{2})
  - Water: 0 sq mi (0 km^{2})
- Elevation: 1,453 ft (443 m)

Population (2020)
  - Total: 460
  - Density: 13/sq mi (4.9/km^{2})
- Time zone: UTC-6 (Central (CST))
  - Summer (DST): UTC-5 (CDT)
- Area codes: 715 & 534
- FIPS code: 55-29837
- GNIS feature ID: 1583290
- PLSS township: T31N R3E
- Website: https://goodrich-wi.proudcity.com/

Goodrich is a town in Taylor County, Wisconsin, United States. The population was 460 at the 2020 census.

== Geography ==
According to the United States Census Bureau, the town has a total area of 36.3 square miles (94. km^{2}), all land. The Big Rib River crosses the northeastern corner of the town.

Other than streambanks, most of the surface of the town is fairly level, laid down by some unknown glacier and eroded long before the last glacier which bulldozed the sharp Perkinstown terminal moraine to the north. The soil of most of Goodrich is called Merrill till, except for meltwater stream sediment along the Big Rib River.

== History ==
The dells of the Big Rib River in Goodrich are probably the rapids where Father René Menard disappeared in 1661, while attempting to reach a band of Huron Indians near the headwaters of the Black River. He left his partner at the rapids to carry some supplies and was never seen again.

The south and east edges of the six by six mile square that would become Goodrich were first surveyed in 1851 by crews working for the U.S. government. In December 1861 a different crew of surveyors marked all the section corners in the township, walking through the woods and swamps, measuring with chain and compass. When done, the deputy surveyor filed this general description:

The surface of this Township is mostly gently rolling and the Soil is principally 2nd Rate being well adapted to agricultural purposes. The Timber is a mixture of Hemlock Birch Sugar (?) Fir and Maple. There is but little Swamp land in the Township but it is well watered by numerous small streams of pure water which are tributaries of the Rib River which (?) through the Township in a South Easterly direction. It is a Stream that does not overflow having but few tributaries(?) to affect its rise and fall. There are no settlers in this Township.

Around 1873 the Wisconsin Central Railroad built its line up through the forest that would become Medford, heading for Ashland. To finance this undertaking, the railroad was granted half the land for eighteen miles on either side of the track laid - generally the odd-numbered sections.

An 1880 map of the area shows some sort of road entering what would become Goodrich from the Medford side, following the course of modern Highway 64 for two miles, then angling south into Marathon County.

A map from around 1900 showed one road following the course of 64 for a few miles, and two other roads along the southwest corner of the town. The map showed five settlers' homesteads along these roads. Otherwise, Goodrich had no roads or settlers. In contrast, lands nearer the railroad at Medford, Stetsonville and Chelsea were fully settled by this time. Much of the unsettled part of this town was held in large blocks, with the largest owners P.A. Merino in the north, H.B. Claflin in the east, and G. Stout in the south. By this time, the Wisconsin Central railroad had sold off most of its odd-numbered sections, but still held some smaller blocks.

When Taylor County was formed in 1875, the six-mile square that would become Goodrich was part of a larger Town of Medford, which spanned the county east to west. In 1895 Browning and Goodrich were split off into a 12-mile-wide town called Browning. In 1903 the town of Goodrich was split out on its own.

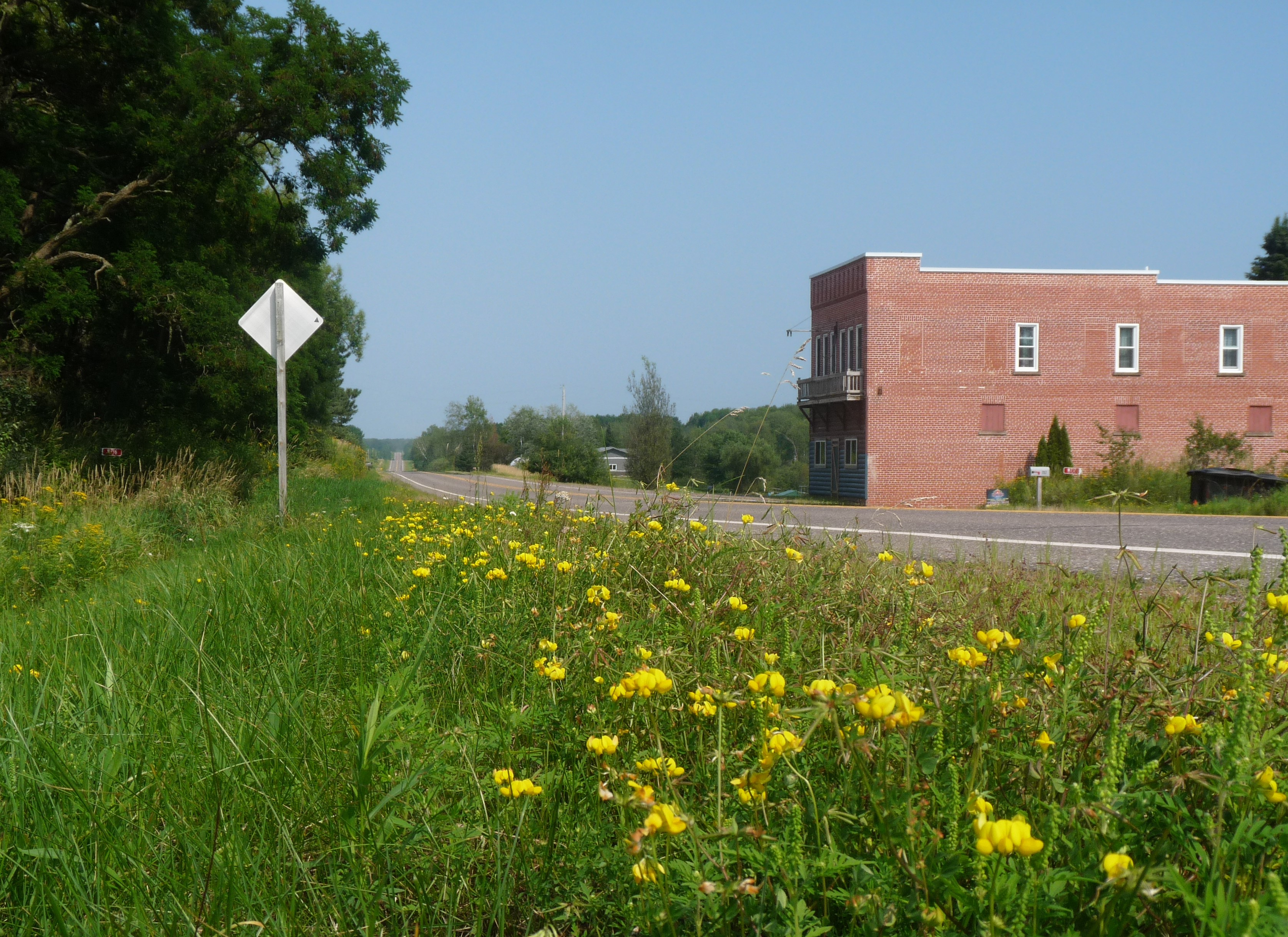
Remnants of the community of Goodrich, facing east on highway 64

The 1911 plat map shows the roads extended, with more settlers along them. The predecessor of highway 64 had been extended another mile to a community of Goodrich, with a sawmill and a school on the map, and a railroad entering from the south. That railroad was Upham Manufacturing's logging line coming up from Athens, by 1911 owned by the Copper River Land Co. Another wagon road followed the course of Martin Road north from 64 to the town line, with shorter roads branching off to the west. Settlers were filling in along all these. Another rural school had appeared along the south boundary of the town. Large chunks still remained unsettled, mostly owned by the Rib River Land Co.

== Demographics ==
As of the census of 2010, there were 510 people, 188 households, and 144 families residing in the town. The population density was 14 people per square mile (5.4/km^{2}). There were 243 housing units at an average density of 6.7 per square mile (2.6/km^{2}). The racial makeup of the town was 99.8% White, and 0.2% from two or more races. Hispanic or Latino people of any race were 0.2% of the population

There were 188 households, out of which 31.4% had children under the age of 18 living with them, 66.5% were married couples living together, 4.8% had a female householder with no husband present, and 23.4% were non-families. 20.2% of all households were made up of individuals, and 22.9% had someone living alone who was 65 years of age or older. The average household size was 2.71 and the average family size was 3.11.

In the town, the population was spread out, with 24.5% under the age of 18, 7.25% from 18 to 24, 23.5% from 25 to 44, 33.1% from 45 to 64, and 11.6% who were 65 years of age or older. The median age was 40.6 years. For every 1 female there were 1.29 males. For every 1 female age 18 and over, there were 1.06 males.

As of the census of 2000, The median income for a household in the town was $42,500, and the median income for a family was $45,000. Males had a median income of $27,788 versus $20,278 for females. The per capita income for the town was $16,724. About 8.8% of families and 10.3% of the population were below the poverty line, including 11.6% of those under age 18 and 18.7% of those age 65 or over.

== Religion ==
The Town of Goodrich has two churches, Goodrich Community Church and St. Andrew's Lutheran Church.

== See also ==
- List of towns in Wisconsin
