= Rib Falls (community), Wisconsin =

Rib Falls, Wisconsin
- Unincorporated community
- Location within Wisconsin Location within the United States
- Coordinates: 44°58′16″N 89°54′13″W
- Country: United States
- State: Wisconsin
- County: Marathon
- Elevation: 1,220 ft (370 m)
- Time zone: UTC-6 (Central (CST))
  - Summer (DST): UTC-5 (CDT)
- Area codes: 715 & 534
- GNIS feature ID: 1572234

Rib Falls (also known as Big Rib Falls) is an unincorporated community located in the town of Rib Falls, Marathon County, Wisconsin, United States. Rib Falls is located on the Big Rib River at the junction of County Highways S and U, 4.5 miles (7.2 km) northwest of Marathon City. The community was named for the river, which takes its name from the English translation of the original Ojibwa name O-pik-wun-a Se-be.
