= AGSM =

AGSM may refer to:

- Associate of the Guildhall School of Music and Drama, post-nominal letters used by those with a specific qualification in professional music performance (rather than drama) following full-time study at the school
- A. Gary Anderson Graduate School of Management, a division of the School of Business Administration at the University of California, Riverside, US
- American Gold Star Mothers, an organization of American mothers who lost sons or daughters in U.S. military service
- Australian Graduate School of Management, the MBA program of the Australian School of Business in Sydney, New South Wales, Australia
- Anti-G Straining Maneuvers, a component of high-G training
