= Big Rib River =

River in Wisconsin, United States

Coordinates: 44°56′44″N 89°40′20″W

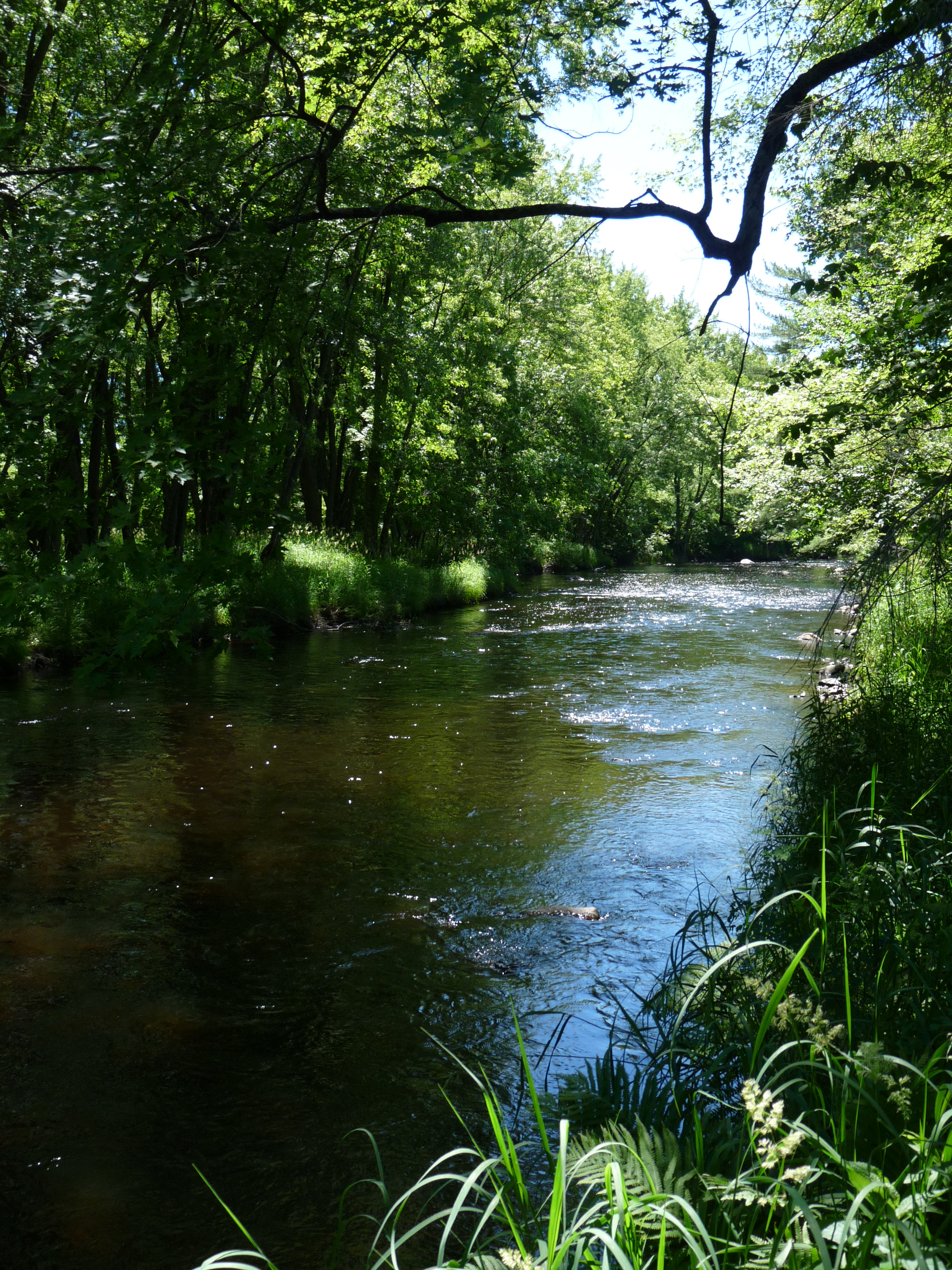
South of the highway 64 bridge, facing downstream

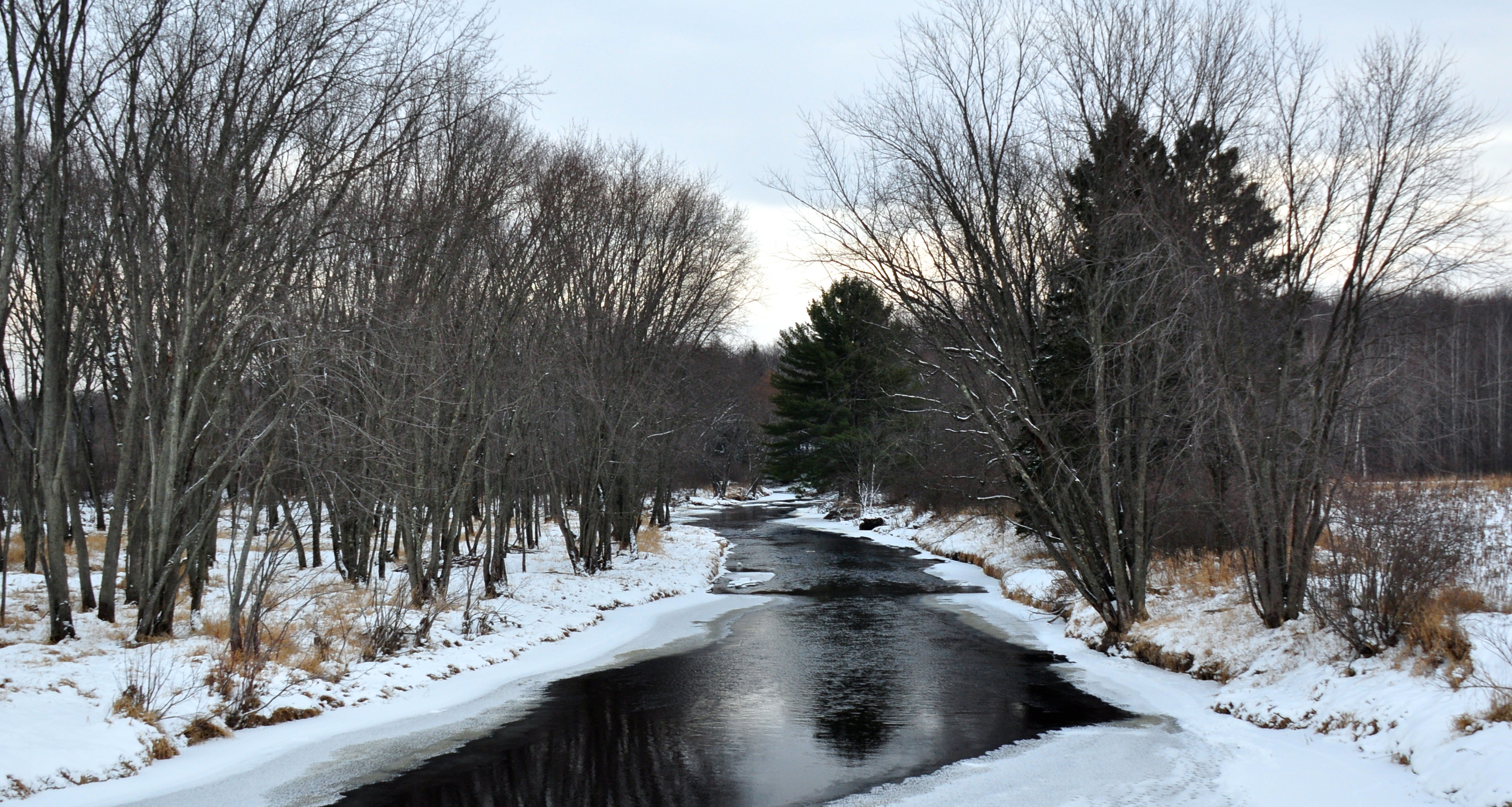
Big Rib River in winter, near Goodrich.

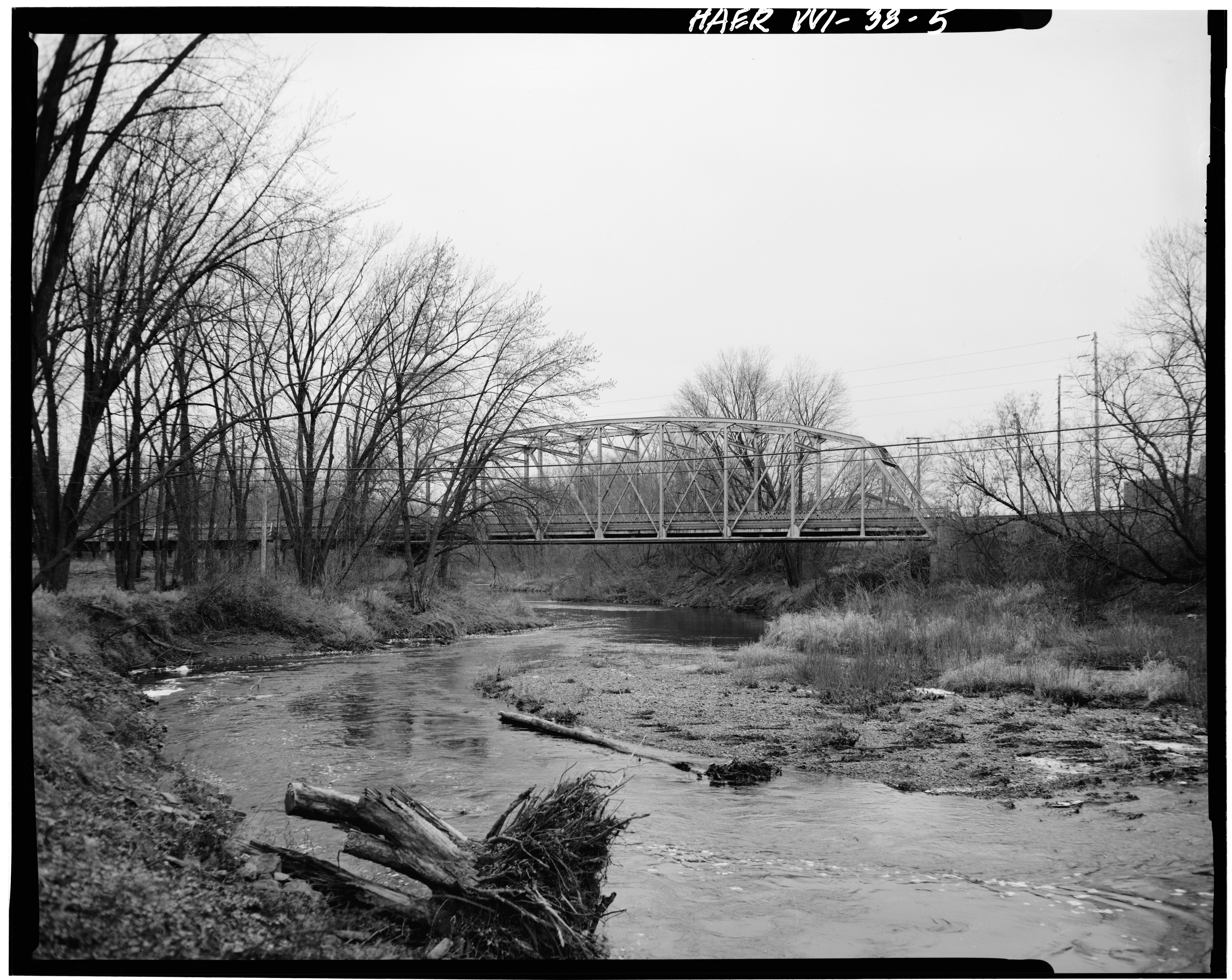
Big Rib River Bridge crossing the river, near Marathon City.

The Big Rib River in central Wisconsin originates in northeastern Taylor County at Rib Lake, and flows into Marathon County where it joins the Wisconsin River. "Rib River" is a translation of the Native American name.

The Big Rib River flows through Rib Falls then to Marathon City, before it converges into the Wisconsin River at the northeast face of Rib Mountain.

The Dells of the Big Rib River, below Goodrich, are believed to be the rapids where Father René Menard disappeared in 1661 while attempting to reach a band of Huron Indians near the headwaters of the Black River. He left his partner at the rapids to carry some supplies and was never seen again.

Log drives began on the upper Rib River around 1874 and continued to 1923.

Today segments of the Big Rib below County C are considered various classes of trout stream by the Wisconsin DNR.

== See also ==
- List of rivers of Wisconsin
