= Richfield, Wisconsin (disambiguation) =

Richfield is a village in Washington County, Wisconsin. Richfield can also refer to the following towns in Wisconsin:

- Richfield, Adams County, Wisconsin
- Richfield, Wood County, Wisconsin
