= Anderson School of Management =

Anderson School of Management may refer to:

- UCLA Anderson School of Management, University of California, Los Angeles
- Anderson School of Management (University of New Mexico)
- A. Gary Anderson Graduate School of Management, University of California, Riverside
