= Greenwood, Wisconsin =

- City
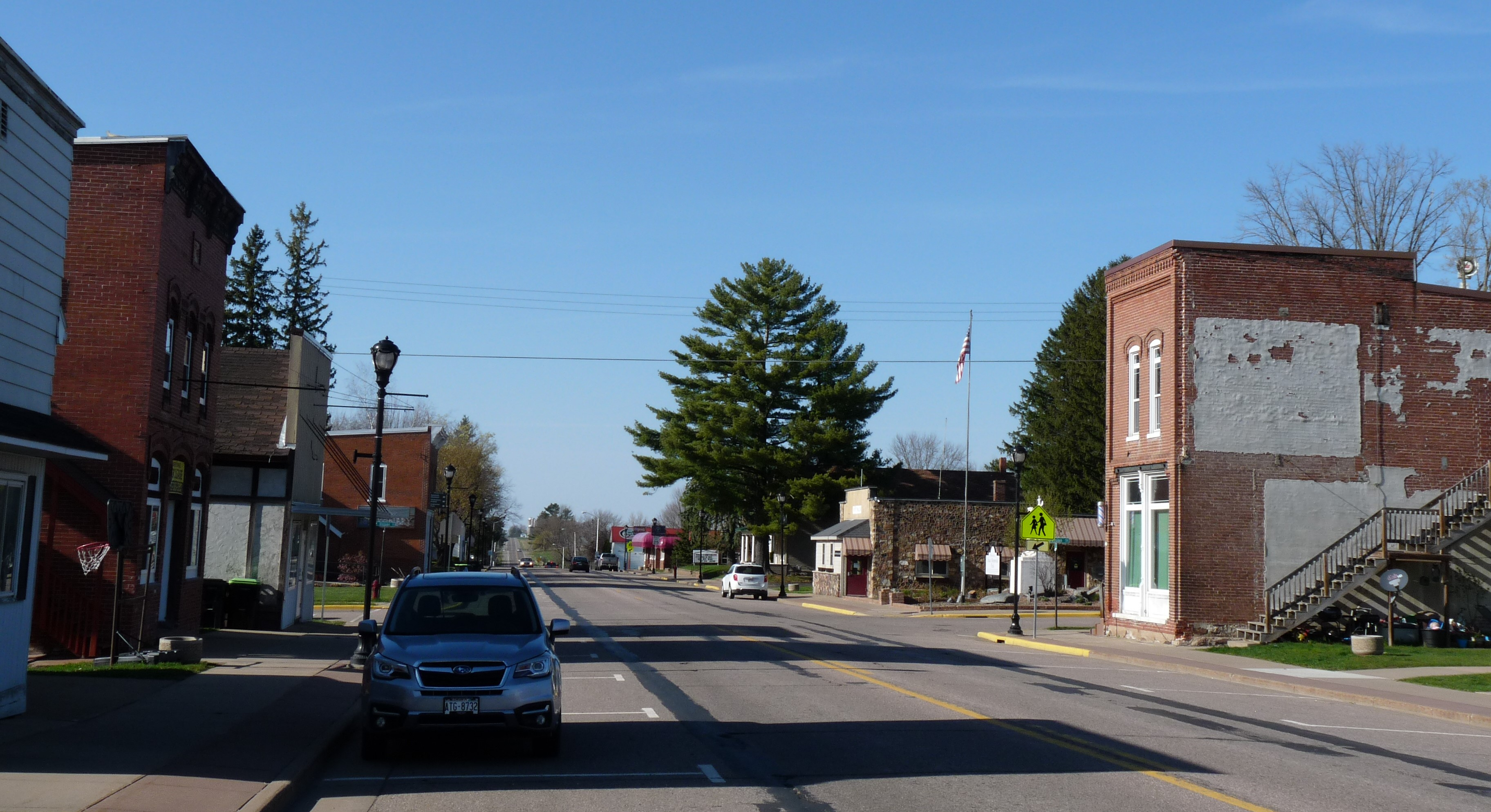
- Part of the old downtown, on WIS 73 looking north

- Location of Greenwood in Clark County, Wisconsin.

- Location within Wisconsin Location within the United States
- Coordinates: 44°46′4″N 90°35′56″W
- Country: United States
- State: Wisconsin
- County: Clark

Area
  - Total: 2.76 sq mi (7.15 km^{2})
  - Land: 2.68 sq mi (6.93 km^{2})
  - Water: 0.085 sq mi (0.22 km^{2})
- Elevation: 1,180 ft (360 m)

Population (2020)
  - Total: 1,058
  - Density: 395/sq mi (153/km^{2})
- Time zone: UTC-6 (Central (CST))
  - Summer (DST): UTC-5 (CDT)
- Area codes: 715 & 534
- FIPS code: 55-31575
- GNIS feature ID: 1565856
- Website: cityofgreenwood.wi.gov

Greenwood is a city in Clark County, Wisconsin, United States. The population was 1,058 at the 2020 census.

== Geography ==
Greenwood is located at 44°46′4″N 90°35′56″W (44.767826, -90.598959).

According to the United States Census Bureau, the city has a total area of 2.86 square miles (7.41 km^{2}), of which 2.78 square miles (7.20 km^{2}) is land and 0.08 square miles (0.21 km^{2}) is water.

The town has a peace memorial, created by Ernest Durig from an artificial stone made using concrete and fine white sand. Unveiled in 1937, it was restored in 1982, and sits adjacent to the 1934 City Hall, on the corner of Main Street and Division Street.

== History ==
In the years just before settlement, the future site of Greenwood was a hunting ground shared by Ojibwe, Menominee and Ho-Chunk people. The Black River ran quietly through immense forests until Mormon loggers came upstream in 1844, working out of a camp downstream from Greenwood's site, cutting white pine logs and floating them down the rivers to be used in their temple in Nauvoo, Illinois.

In 1847 or 1848 Van Dusen and Waterman built a mill on the west side of the Black River across from where Greenwood would grow. Albert Lambert built another mill nearby. Elijah and Frederick Eaton bought Van Dusen's mill in 1854. A little mill town began to take shape, called Eatonville for a while.

By 1869 the community had a log schoolhouse, several log houses, and two frame houses, and S.C. Honeywell sold a few goods out of his house. The following year Chandler and Brown from Black River Falls opened a store and W.H. Begley opened a hotel. At this time a stagecoach came up from Black River Falls to Greenwood. The village of Greenwood was platted in 1871. That same year, a four-room frame school was built.

A fire in 1885 destroyed eight buildings, but the town continued to grow. By 1890 the village had "three general stores, two hardware stores, two meat markets, two blacksmith shops, two millinery and dressmaking establishments, one wagon shop, one grocery store, one confectionary store, one flour and agricultural implement store, one harness shop, one shoe shop, one furniture store and factory, one hotel, one barber shop, one public hall, one Odd Fellows hall, one Methodist Episcopal Church, one photograph gallery, one creamery and one sawmill."

Greenwood was incorporated as a city in 1891, the same year the Wisconsin Central Railroad connected Greenwood to Loyal and Marshfield. In 1895 the Fairchild and Northeastern Railroad connected from the southwest, and ran its line north to Owen. A fire in 1900 destroyed Greenwood's heading mill.

By 1918, Greenwood's main industries were agricultural - not lumber. The Greenwood Cheese House and Parafining Station coated the product of surrounding cheese factories in paraffin and shipped it. Greenwood Roller Mills was a steam-powered mill which produced flour and feed. The American Society of Equity was a cattle dealer. Eau Claire Creamery Company ran a plant that bought, pasteurized and shipped milk.

== Demographics ==
Historical population
Census	Pop.	Note	%±
1900	708		—
1910	665		−6.1%
1920	761		14.4%
1930	651		−14.5%
1940	776		19.2%
1950	956		23.2%
1960	1,041		8.9%
1970	1,036		−0.5%
1980	1,124		8.5%
1990	969		−13.8%
2000	1,079		11.4%
2010	1,026		−4.9%
2020	1,058		3.1%
U.S. Decennial Census

=== 2010 census ===
As of the census of 2010, there were 1,026 people, 464 households, and 259 families living in the city. The population density was 369.1 inhabitants per square mile (142.5/km^{2}). There were 520 housing units at an average density of 187.1 per square mile (72.2/km^{2}). The racial makeup of the city was 97.5% White, 0.9% African American, 0.4% Native American, 0.1% Asian, 0.7% from other races, and 0.5% from two or more races. Hispanic or Latino of any race were 1.5% of the population.

There were 464 households, of which 24.4% had children under the age of 18 living with them, 43.8% were married couples living together, 7.5% had a female householder with no husband present, 4.5% had a male householder with no wife present, and 44.2% were non-families. 36.6% of all households were made up of individuals, and 16.2% had someone living alone who was 65 years of age or older. The average household size was 2.18 and the average family size was 2.87.

The median age in the city was 44.1 years. 22.5% of residents were under the age of 18; 7.6% were between the ages of 18 and 24; 21.2% were from 25 to 44; 27.1% were from 45 to 64; and 21.7% were 65 years of age or older. The gender makeup of the city was 48.1% male and 51.9% female.

=== 2000 census ===
As of the census of 2000, there were 1,079 people, 468 households, and 287 families living in the city. The population density was 381.9 people per square mile (147.2/km^{2}). There were 502 housing units at an average density of 177.7 per square mile (68.5/km^{2}). The racial makeup of the city was 99.17% White, 0.19% Native American, 0.09% Asian, 0.09% from other races, and 0.46% from two or more races. Hispanic or Latino of any race were 1.11% of the population.

There were 468 households, out of which 27.8% had children under the age of 18 living with them, 50.9% were married couples living together, 6.4% had a female householder with no husband present, and 38.5% were non-families. 34.2% of all households were made up of individuals, and 19.2% had someone living alone who was 65 years of age or older. The average household size was 2.27 and the average family size was 2.93.

In the city, the population was spread out, with 23.6% under the age of 18, 7.5% from 18 to 24, 28.5% from 25 to 44, 18.6% from 45 to 64, and 21.8% who were 65 years of age or older. The median age was 38 years. For every 100 females, there were 93.7 males. For every 100 females age 18 and over, there were 93.9 males.

The median income for a household in the city was $32,917, and the median income for a family was $43,438. Males had a median income of $33,750 versus $22,132 for females. The per capita income for the city was $18,841. About 5.7% of families and 9.3% of the population were below the poverty line, including 13.1% of those under age 18 and 11.1% of those age 65 or over.

== Notable people ==
- Mildred Barber Abel (1902 - 1976), Wisconsin State Representative
- Joseph L. Barber (1864 - 1940), Wisconsin State Senator
- Cy Buker (1918 - 2011), Major League Baseball pitcher for the Brooklyn Dodgers
- Harland Carl (1931 - 2023), National Football League player with the Chicago Bears
- Mose Gingerich (born 1979), host of reality TV series about Amish people
- William C. Kavanaugh (1914 - 1991), Wisconsin State Representative
- Larry Krause (born 1948), National Football League player with the Green Bay Packers
- Bill Miklich (1919 - 2005), National Football League player with the New York Giants and Detroit Lions
- Mae Schunk (born 1934), Lieutenant Governor of Minnesota

== Images ==
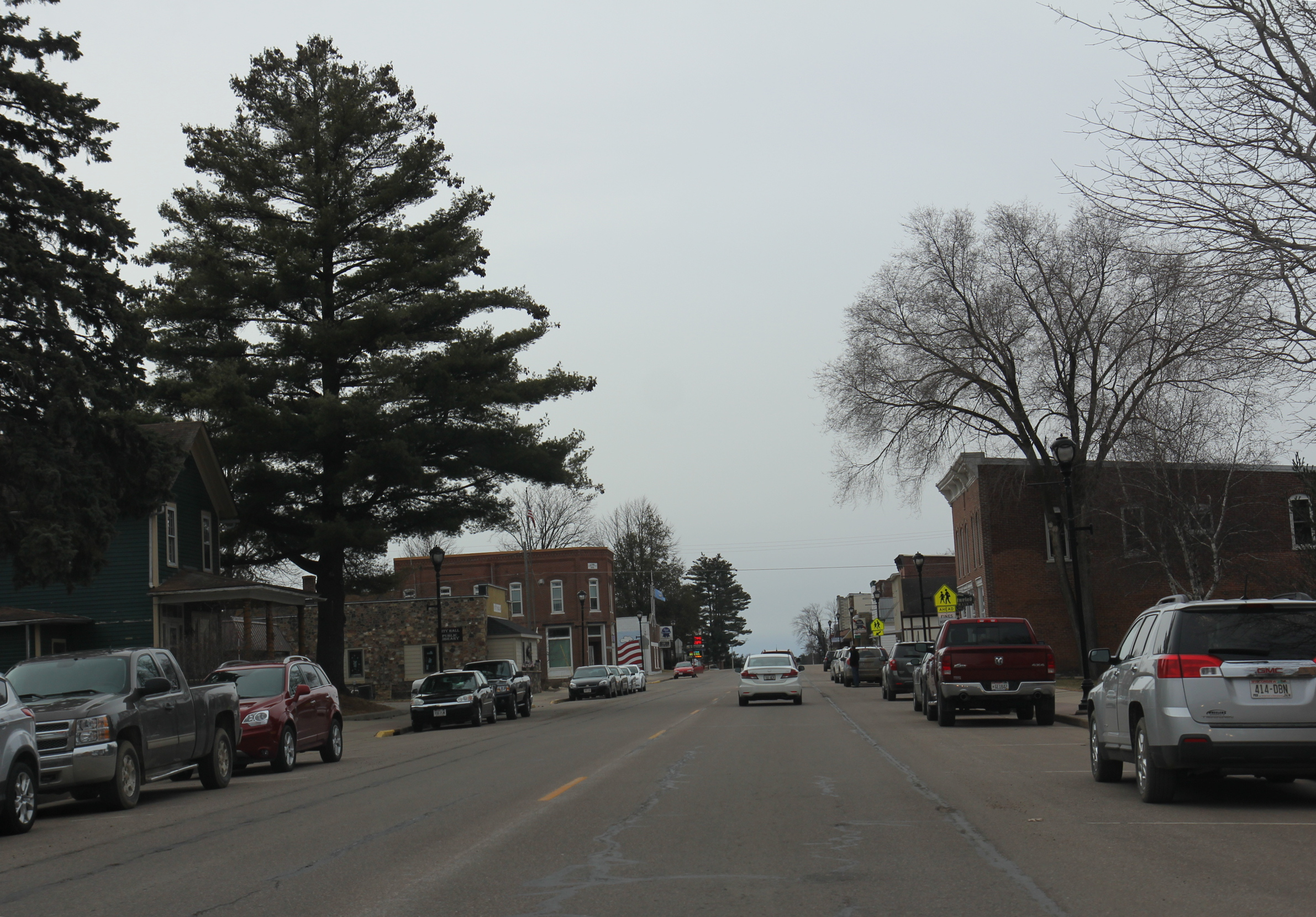
Looking south in downtown Greenwood on WIS 73

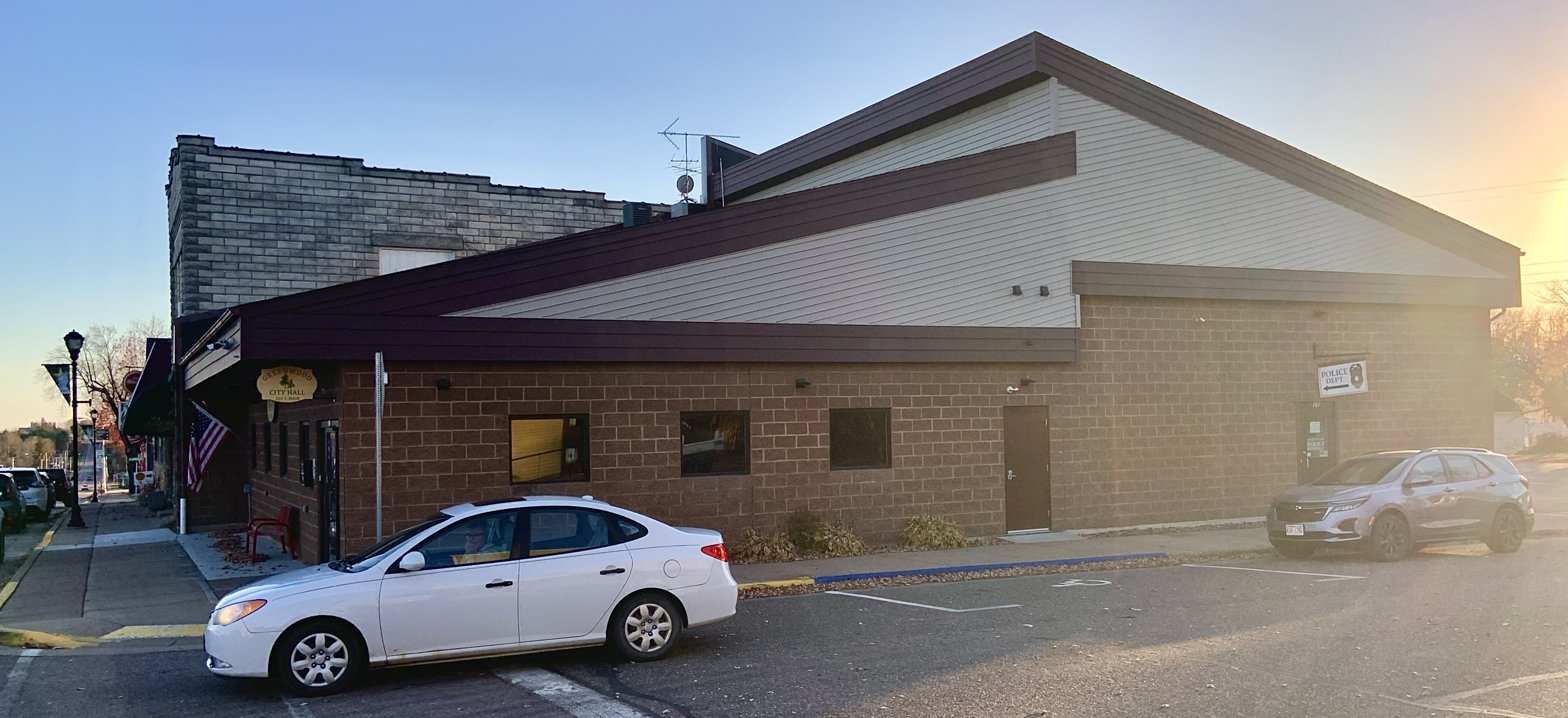
Greenwood City Hall

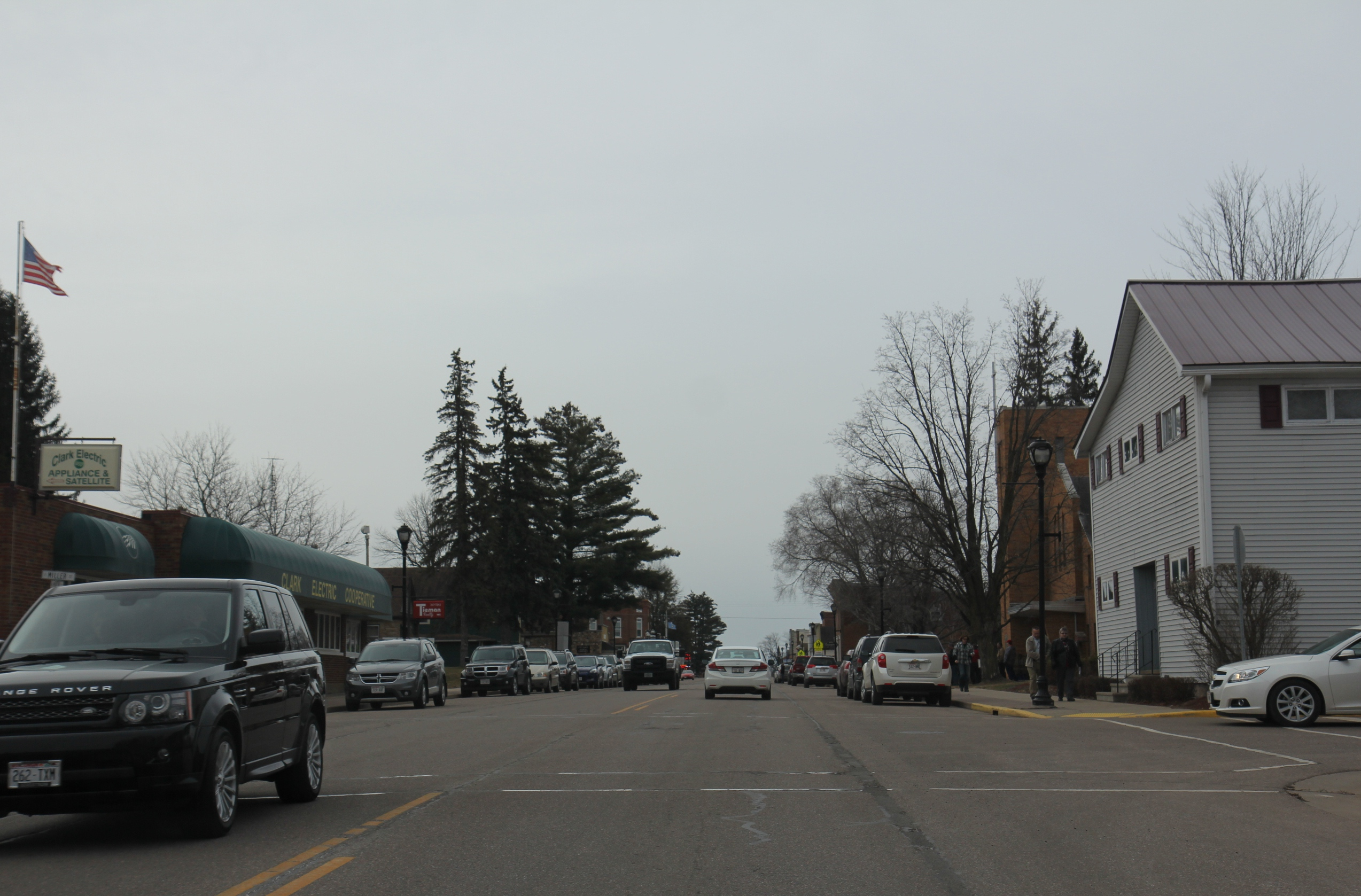
Looking south in Greenwood on WIS 73

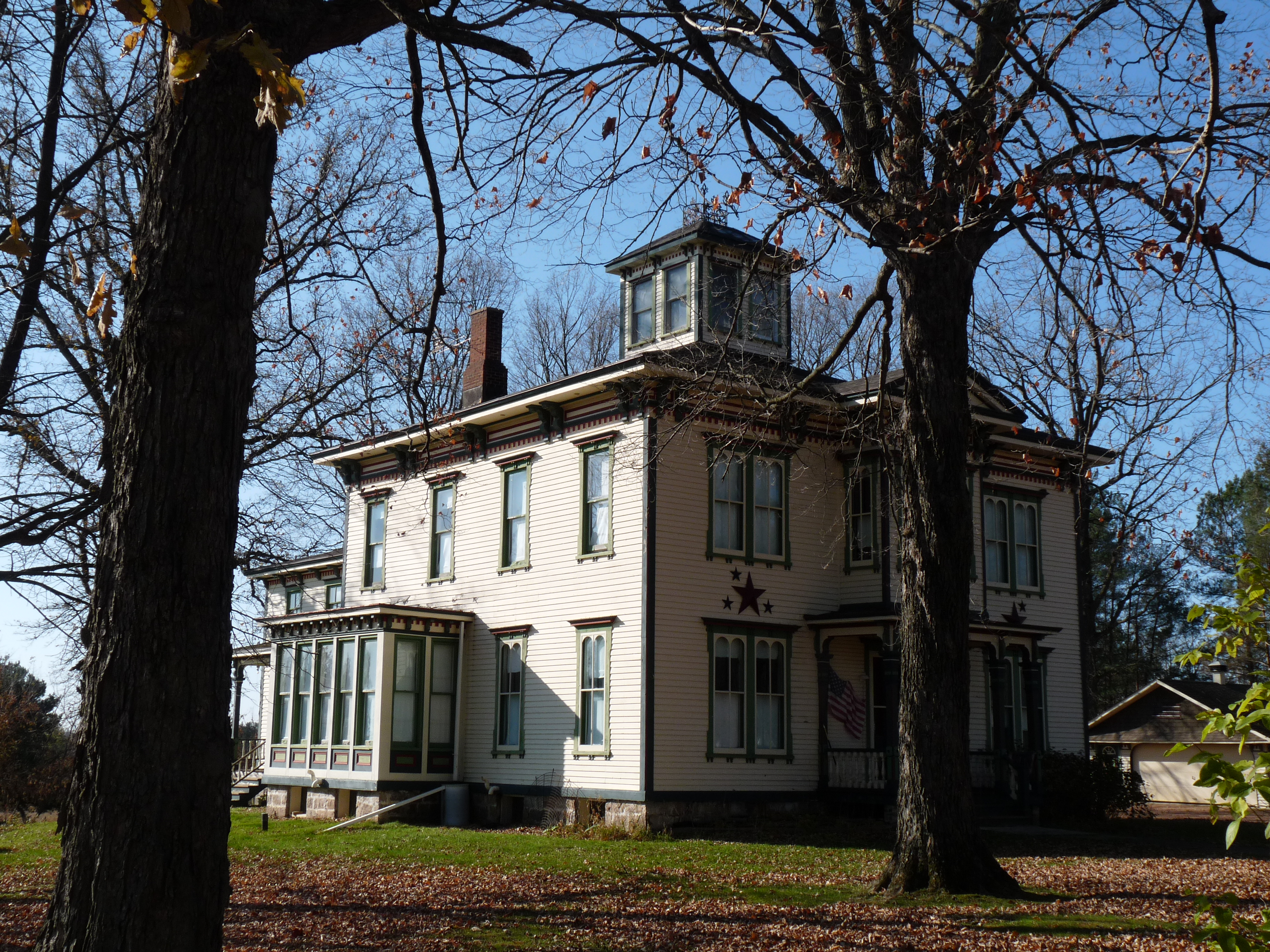
Robert Schofield House
