= William C. Kavanaugh =

American politician (1914–1991)

William C. Kavanaugh (May 26, 1914, in East Chicago, Indiana – March 8, 1991, in Sun City West, Arizona), was a member of the Wisconsin State Assembly.

Kavanaugh was born on May 26, 1914. He would graduate from Oglethorpe University. During World War II, Kavanaugh served in the United States Army. He died on March 14, 1991.

== Political career ==
Kavanaugh was elected to the Assembly in 1966. Additionally, he was a member of the Clark County, Wisconsin Board of Supervisors and the Greenwood, Wisconsin School Board. He was a Republican.
