= Cy Buker =

American baseball player (1918-2011)

- Pitcher
- Born: February 5, 1918; Greenwood, Wisconsin, U.S.
- Died: October 11, 2011 (aged 93); Greenwood, Wisconsin, U.S.
- Batted: Left Threw: Right

MLB debut
- May 17, 1945, for the Brooklyn Dodgers

Last MLB appearance
- September 23, 1945, for the Brooklyn Dodgers

MLB statistics
- Win–loss record: 7–2
- Earned run average: 3.30
- Strikeouts: 48
- Stats at Baseball Reference

Teams
- Brooklyn Dodgers (1945)

Cyril Owen Buker (February 5, 1918 – October 11, 2011) was an American Major League Baseball pitcher who played for the Brooklyn Dodgers in 1945. The 26-year-old rookie right-hander stood 5 feet 11 inches (1.80 m) and weighed 190 pounds (86 kg).

Buker is one of many ballplayers who only appeared in the major leagues during World War II. He made his major league debut in relief on May 17, 1945, against the Pittsburgh Pirates at Ebbets Field. His first major league win came in his first start, on June 21, 1945, as the Dodgers defeated the Philadelphia Phillies 9–2 at Shibe Park. Andy Karl was the losing pitcher.

His season and career totals for 42 games include a 7–2 record, four games started, 22 games finished, five saves, and an ERA of 3.30 in 87 1/3 innings pitched. Besides pitching well, Buker could swing the bat. He was 3-for-16 (.188) with a walk and two runs batted in.

Following his Brooklyn days, Buker eventually returned to his hometown of Greenwood, Wisconsin where he began a successful coaching career, eventually being named to the Wisconsin Football and Basketball Coaches Association Hall of Fame. His son, Tom, would later coach at the school, leading it to class C titles in boys' basketball and baseball in 1988.

Buker died on October 11, 2011, in Greenwood, Wisconsin.
