= Ernest Durig =

Sculptor and art forger

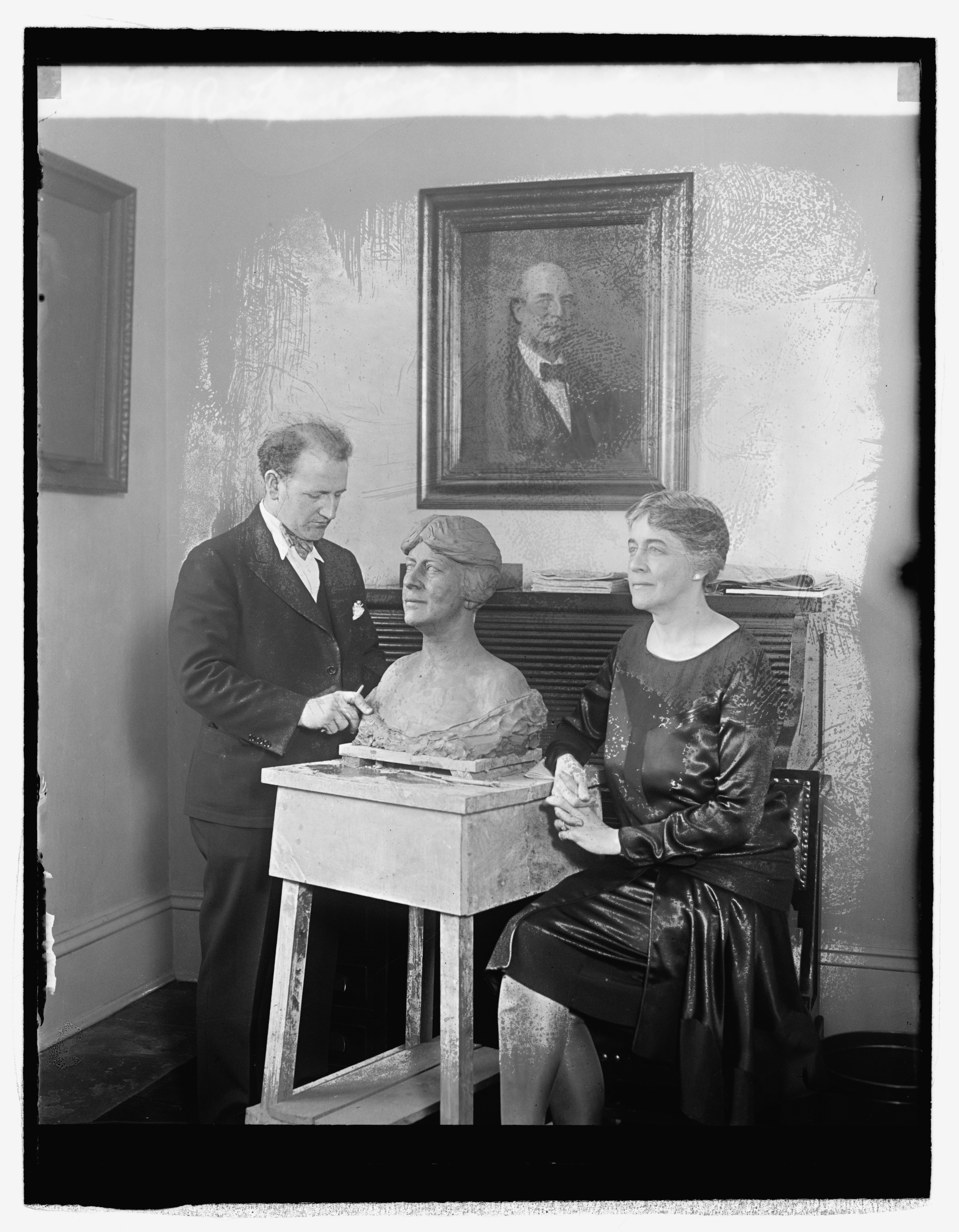
- Ruth Bryan Owen poses for Durig, 1920
- Born: 1894; Zürich, Switzerland
- Died: 1962 (aged 67–68); Washington, D.C., United States
- Occupation: Sculptor
- Known for: Art forgery

Ernest Durig (1894–1962) was a sculptor and art forger, known for his faking of drawings by Auguste Rodin.

Durig claimed to have been a pupil of Rodin, but the only documentation of their having ever met is a single photograph.

As a sculptor, Durig, no doubt helped by his claimed link to Rodin, modelled busts for a number of notables in the United States establishment. His sitters included Mussolini, US President Harry S. Truman, and the actor Will Rogers. He sculpted a peace memorial for Greenwood, Wisconsin, from an artificial stone made using concrete and fine white sand. Unveiled in 1937, it was restored in 1982.

In July 2016 BBC Television screened an episode of Fake or Fortune?, in which a privately held watercolour of a Cambodian dancer, supposedly by Rodin, was exposed as a Durig fake.

The New York Museum of Modern Art holds a collection of his drawings. Others, previously thought to be by Rodin, are in the Musée d'Orsay in Paris. Durig's extensive career of forgery was first exposed in the 4 June 1965 issue of LIFE.

== Bibliography ==
- Düringer, Ernst (1948). Ernest Durig: sculptures.
