= Claude Taugher =

Recipient of the Naval cross (1897–1963)

No. 86
- Position: Fullback

Personal information
- Born: March 2, 1895; Marathon, Wisconsin, U.S.
- Died: February 8, 1963 (aged 67); Dane County, Wisconsin, U.S.
- Listed height: 5 ft 10 in (1.78 m)
- Listed weight: 185 lb (84 kg)

Career information
- High school: Wausau (Wisconsin)
- College: Carroll

Career history
- Green Bay Packers (1922)

Career statistics
- Games played: 2
- Stats at Pro Football Reference

Claude Buckley Taugher (March 2, 1895 – February 8, 1963), also known as Biff Taugher, was a player in the National Football League for the Green Bay Packers in 1922 as a fullback. He also was an officer with the United States Marine Corps during World War I, and was awarded the Navy Cross and the Distinguished Service Cross.

== Football career ==
Taugher first played at the collegiate level at Carroll College. After returning from World War I, Taugher then played for Marquette University. On September 1, 1922, the football coach for Marquette University gave the Packers permission to sign Taugher. The Packers wished to get official permission, since the team had been in trouble with the league the year before for signing ineligible players. Taugher played for only one season. He coached the Carroll College football team in 1923, compiling a 0-3-1 record.

== Military career ==
Taugher was a second lieutenant with the 6th Regiment, 4th Brigade (Marine), 2nd Division of the American Expeditionary Forces during World War I. He was awarded the Navy Cross, the Silver Star and the Distinguished Service Cross.

His Navy Cross citation reads:

The President of the United States of America takes pleasure in presenting the Navy Cross to Second Lieutenant Claude Buckley Taugher (MCSN: 0-3440), United States Marine Corps, for extraordinary heroism while serving with the 6th Regiment (Marines), 2d Division, A.E.F. in action at Bayonville, France, 2 November 1918. Lieutenant Taugher, with great dash, led his platoon in surrounding enemy dugouts in the village of Bayonville before the occupants had time to escape or organize effective resistance, capturing sixty-one of the enemy. Although wounded in the ankle he refused to be evacuated.

His Distinguished Service Cross citation reads:

The President of the United States of America, authorized by Act of Congress, July 9, 1918, takes pleasure in presenting the Distinguished Service Cross to Second Lieutenant Claude Buckley Taugher (MCSN: 0-3440), United States Marine Corps, for extraordinary heroism while serving with the Sixth Regiment (Marines), 2d Division, A.E.F., in action at Bayonville, France, 2 November 1918. Lieutenant Taugher, with great dash, led his platoon in surrounding enemy dugouts in the village of Bayonville before the occupants had time to escape or organize effective resistance, capturing sixty-one of the enemy. Although wounded in the ankle he refused to be evacuated.

His Silver Star citation reads:

Awarded for actions during the World War I

By direction of the President, under the provisions of the act of Congress approved July 9, 1918 (Bul. No. 43, W.D., 1918), Second Lieutenant Claude Buckley Taugher (MCSN: 0-3440), United States Marine Corps, is cited by the Commanding General, American Expeditionary Forces, for gallantry in action and a silver star may be placed upon the ribbon of the Victory Medals awarded him. Second Lieutenant Taugher distinguished himself while serving with the Sixth Regiment (Marines), 2d Division, American Expeditionary Forces during the Meuse-Argonne Offensive, France, 30 September to 11 November 1918.

General Orders: Citation Orders, 2d Division, American Expeditionary Forces Action Date: September 30 - November 11, 1918 Service: Marine Corps Rank: Second Lieutenant Regiment: 6th Regiment (Marines) Division: 2d Division, American Expeditionary Forces

Taugher was honorably discharged from the Marine Corps as first lieutenant on August 15, 1919. His registered address at his appointment was in Wausau, Wisconsin, with his father, P. J. Taugher.

== Personal life ==
Taugher was born on March 2, 1895, in Marathon, Wisconsin, to P. J. Taugher, a medical professional from Marathon City, and Maryanne Buckley Taugher.

He died on February 8, 1963, and was buried in Wood National Cemetery. He and his wife had three daughters: Janice Mary Taugher Ley, Maureen Taugher Christman and Mary Ann Ellen Taugher Schloer.
