= Robert M. Schofield =

American physicist

- Born: 1960 (age 65–66)
- Other name: Robert M. S. Schofield
- Education: B.A. Psychology, 1982 and B.A. Physics, 1983 Brigham Young University; Ph.D., Biophysics, 1990 University of Oregon
- Awards: 2014 Fellow, American Physical Society; 2017 Outstanding Accomplishment Non-Tenure-Track Faculty Research
- Scientific career
- Fields: Physics; Biophysics
- Thesis: X-ray microanalytic concentration measurements in unsectioned specimens: A technique and its application to zinc, manganese, and iron enriched mechanical structures of organisms from three phyla (1990)
- Doctoral advisor: Harlan w. Lefevre

Robert M. Schofield (born 1960) is an American physicist and a research associate professor at the University of Oregon (UO). He was elected a Fellow of the American Physical Society in 2014.

== Early life and education ==
Born in 1960, Schofield holds bachelor's degrees in experimental psychology (1982) and in physics (1983) from Brigham Young University. He earned a Ph.D. in 1990 at the University of Oregon, with the dissertation, X-ray microanalytic concentration measurements in unsectioned specimens: A technique and its application to zinc, manganese, and iron enriched mechanical structures of organisms from three phyla, advised by Harlan W. Lefevre.

Schofield held postdoctoral positions in the university's Institute of Molecular Biology and at Lund University. He then joined the UO as a research faculty member, and was promoted in 2020 to research associate professor.

== Career ==
Schofield's research interests include gravitational waves and structural biophysics. He has been described as "an inter-disciplinarian, merging principles from physics, biology and materials science in pursuit of his passions".

=== LIGO ===
Schofield also found an unusual noise source that was recurring on hot summer afternoons: ravens were pecking the ice on pipes from a nitrogen cryopump maintaining the vacuum inside LIGO's concrete arms. Schofield said, "They peck for a while and make themselves a snow cone." The remedy was to insulate the pipes to avoid attracting the ravens, and also to fix an instrument that jiggled when the ravens pecked.

Schofield's work to enhance the sensitivity of the Laser Interferometer Gravitational-wave Observatory (LIGO) has allowed physicists to detect gravitational waves produced by colliding black holes. LIGO's biggest challenge is detector noise, from seismic waves, thermal motion, and photon shot noise, disturbances that could mask signals from gravitational waves. LIGO can detect "a truck rumbling past, the humming of a refrigerator in a nearby building, or the distant flutter of a plane's propellers".

Laura Hamers wrote, "Gravitational waves are so faint by the time they reach Earth that they can be drowned out by closer-to-home disturbances most of us wouldn't even notice. For example, the early LIGO detectors were so sensitive that water going over a dam 30 kilometers away could throw off the data, said Schofield, who co-leads the environmental monitoring at the Hanford detector. He and his colleagues have placed a bevy of sensors around the detectors, which keep track of external disruptions like rumbling traffic or crackling lightning."

Elected a Fellow of the American Physical Society, Schofield was cited for "leadership in identifying and mitigating environmental factors which impact the sensitivity of terrestrial gravitational wave detectors and elimination [of] spurious noise sources in LIGO."

=== Biophysics ===
BBC News said of Schofield's findings, "Central American leaf-cutter ants 'retire' from their cutting role when they grow old, switching to carrying when their jaws blunt with age... Dr Schofield and his team used electron microscopy to compare the pristine teeth of laboratory-reared pupae with the worn teeth of the wild forager ants."

Schofield has found similarities between his research methods in biology and physics. For example, micromanipulators used in physics to guide a laser beam can be reconfigured to move an ant mandible through a leaf, allowing measurement of force. In addition, calculations Schofield uses in biology are similar to calculations in his work at LIGO.

In January 2016, Schofield and five undergraduate researchers published a paper in Royal Society Open Science, making video clips of ants' leaf processing behaviors. They "documented never-before-seen looks at the ants' prehensile skills — they're good at grabbing — and the layers of behaviors associated with gathering leaves, delivering them to the nests and processing them to grow the fungus that colony members eat".

Schofield and 15 students from University of Oregon and Lane Community College conducted studies in 2021 that led to the discovery of the heavy element materials zinc and manganese in "ant mandibles, spider fangs and scorpion sting tips" that harden and sharpen their cutting tools.

=== Mentoring ===
Schofield served as a mentor for McNair Scholars at UO between 2015 and 2017, supervising student participation in biology and biochemistry projects.

== Selected publications ==
=== LIGO ===
- LIGO Scientific Collaboration and Virgo Collaboration (February 11, 2016). "Observation of Gravitational Waves from a Binary Black Hole Merger". Physical Review Letters. 116 (6) 061102. arXiv:1602.03837. Bibcode:2016PhRvL.116f1102A. doi:10.1103/PhysRevLett.116.061102. PMID 26918975. S2CID 119286014.
- Brooks, Aidan F.; Vajente, Gabriele; Yamamoto, Hiro; Abbott, Rich; Adams, Carl; et al. (May 1, 2021). "Point absorbers in Advanced LIGO". Applied Optics. 60 (13): 4047–4063. arXiv:2101.05828. Bibcode:2021ApOpt..60.4047B. doi:10.1364/AO.419689. PMID 33983346. S2CID 231627516.
- Thrane, Eric; Christensen, Nelson; Schofield, Robert M. S.; Effler, Anamaria (July 11, 2014). "Correlated noise in networks of gravitational-wave detectors: subtraction and mitigation". Physical Review D. 90 (2) 023013. arXiv:1406.2367. Bibcode:2014PhRvD..90b3013T. doi:10.1103/PhysRevD.90.023013. S2CID 9395488.
- Brooks, Aidan F.; et al. (2021). "Point absorbers in Advanced LIGO". Applied Optics. 60 (13): 4047–4063. arXiv:2101.05828. Bibcode:2021ApOpt..60.4047B. doi:10.1364/AO.419689. PMID 33983346. S2CID 231627516.
- Janssens, Kamiel; Ball, Matthew; Schofield, Robert M. S.; Christensen, Nelson; Frey, Raymond; van Remortel, Nick; Banagiri, Sharan; Coughlin, Michael W.; Effler, Anamaria; Gołkowski, Mark; Kubisz, Jerzy; Ostrowski, Michał (2023). "Correlated 1–1000 Hz magnetic field fluctuations from lightning over Earth-scale distances and their impact on gravitational wave searches". Physical Review D. 107 (2) 022004. arXiv:2209.00284. Bibcode:2023PhRvD.107b2004J. doi:10.1103/PhysRevD.107.022004. S2CID 251979582.

=== Biophysics ===
- Schofield, Robert M.; Nesson, Michael H; Richardson, Kathleen A. (December 3, 2002). "Tooth hardness increases with zinc-content in mandibles of young adult leaf-cutter ants". Naturwissenschaften. 89 (12): 579–583. Bibcode:2002NW.....89..579S. doi:10.1007/s00114-002-0381-4. PMID 12536282. S2CID 12156985.
- Schofield, Robert M. S.; Nesson, Michael H. (August 22, 2003). "Comment on 'High Abrasion Resistance with Sparse Mineralization: Copper Biomineral in Worm Jaws'". Science. 301 (5636): 1049. doi:10.1126/science.1089289. PMID 12933994. S2CID 39841691.
- Schofield, Robert M.; Emmett, Kristen D; Niedbala, Jack C.; Nesson, Michael H. (May 2011). "Leaf-cutter ants with worn mandibles cut half as fast". Behavioral Ecology and Sociobiology. 65 (5): 969–982. doi:10.1007/s00265-010-1098-6. S2CID 31529329. ProQuest 862125381.
- Schofield, R. M. S.; Bailey, J.; Coon, J. J.; Devaraj, A.; Garrett, R. W.; Goggans, M. S.; Hebner, M. G.; Lee, B. S.; Lee, D.; Lovern, N.; Ober-Singleton, S.; Saephan, N.; Seagal, V. R.; Silver, D. M.; Som, H. E. (September 1, 2021). "The homogenous alternative to biomineralization: Zn- and Mn-rich materials enable sharp organismal 'tools' that reduce force requirements". Scientific Reports. 11 (1): 17481. Bibcode:2021NatSR..1117481S. doi:10.1038/s41598-021-91795-y. PMC 8410824. PMID 34471148.

== Awards, honors ==
- 2014 Fellow of the American Physical Society
- 2017 Outstanding Accomplishment Non-Tenure-Track Faculty Researcher award

== See also ==
- Michelson interferometers
