= Bethel, Wisconsin =

- unincorporated community
- Location of Bethel in Wisconsin
- Coordinates: 44°32′26″N 90°05′23″W
- Country: United States
- State: Wisconsin
- County: Wood County
- Settled: 1899
- Elevation: 1,234 ft (376 m)
- Time zone: UTC-6 (Central (CST))
  - Summer (DST): UTC-5 (CDT)
- ZIP code: 54410
- Area codes: 715 & 534
- FIPS code: 55141
- GNIS feature ID: 1561624

Bethel is an unincorporated community located in the town of Richfield, in Wood County, Wisconsin, United States.

== Settlement ==
Bethel was established in 1899 as a Seventh-day Adventist education and religious community. The land had belonged to the Lyman Lumber Company. Lyman offered 200 acres (0.81 km^{2}) to the S.D.A.'s Wisconsin conference if they would agree to buy an additional 800 acres of Lyman land. The conference, then led by Elder William Covert, accepted the offer. Elder T.B. Snow was the first settler to arrive, initially living in a tent while he chopped trees, and writing home to his wife from "Camp Solitude."

Snow's solitude proved short-lived as he was soon joined by other settlers, students, and teachers. Elder Covert himself moved to Bethel with his family to help develop the institution. The first frame building was a school, and a post office was established in 1899. In 1900 another frame building was completed which served as dormitory, church, church schoolhouse, store and post office. Other buildings followed.

== Educational Academy ==
Rooted as a religious educational institution, many families moved into the Bethel area seeking religious education for their students. The school was best known for its industrious education and manual arts.

“The purpose of the academy from its foundation has been to give young people a broad symmetrical training for usefulness, and to lay a solid foundation for any work they may do in a more advanced school. The academy was located in a rural section removed from the contaminating influence of city life, where the teachers and students might devote a part of their time to agriculture and other industries,”

At the height of its existence, the Bethel educational institution consisted of boys and girls dormitories, post office, school farm of 100 acres (0.40 km^{2}) in size, two barns, carpenter shop, bee house, and two staves. The Bethel academy’s average student population was 130 students during the 1920s.
