= Raymond E. Frey =

American physicist and professor, born 1956

- Born: 1956 (age 69–70)
- Education: University of California, Riverside
- Awards: Fellow, American Physical Society; As co-discoverer of gravitational waves: 2016 Milner Breakthrough Prize in Fundamental Physics; 2016 Gruber Cosmology Prize; 2017 Bruno Rossi Prize; 2017 Royal Astronomical Society Group Achievement Award
- Scientific career
- Fields: High energy particles and fields
- Workplaces: University of Oregon
- Thesis: Charm Production at the CERN Proton-Antiproton Collider
- Doctoral advisor: Anne Kernan

Raymond E. Frey (/fraɪ/; b. 1956) is an American physicist on the faculty of the University of Oregon. His research interests include gravitational wave detection and astrophysics.

== Early life and education ==
Born in 1956, Ray Frey is the son of USAF Lt. Col. Raymond E. Frey and Ellen L. (née Hagerstrand) Frey. In 1978 he completed his undergraduate degree at the University of California, Irvine, and earned an M.S. (1981) and a Ph.D. in physics in 1984 at the University of California, Riverside, specializing in Experimental High Energy Physics.

== Awards and honors ==
- 1993 – SSC Fellowship
- 1995-1996 – Commissioner of SLD at SLAC
- 1998-2000 – Chair, SLAC Users Organization
- 2009 – University of Oregon Research Innovation Award
- 2010-202013 and 2019-2022 – Member, Executive Committee, LIGO Scientific Collaboration
- As co-discoverer of gravitational waves: 2016 Milner Breakthrough Prize in Fundamental Physics, 2016 Gruber Prize in Cosmology, 2017 Bruno Rossi Prize, 2017 Royal Astronomical Society Group Achievement Award
- 2017-2018 – University of Oregon Fund for Faculty Excellence Award
- 2019 – University of Oregon award, Gravitational Wave Astrophysics with LIGO
- 2022 – Fellow of the American Institute of Physics, cited, "For leadership in several areas leading to gravitational wave detection, including the effects of environmental influences on the LIGO detectors and the searches for gravitational waves associated with astrophysical events, most notably gamma-ray bursts."
