= Marathon, Wisconsin =

- Town
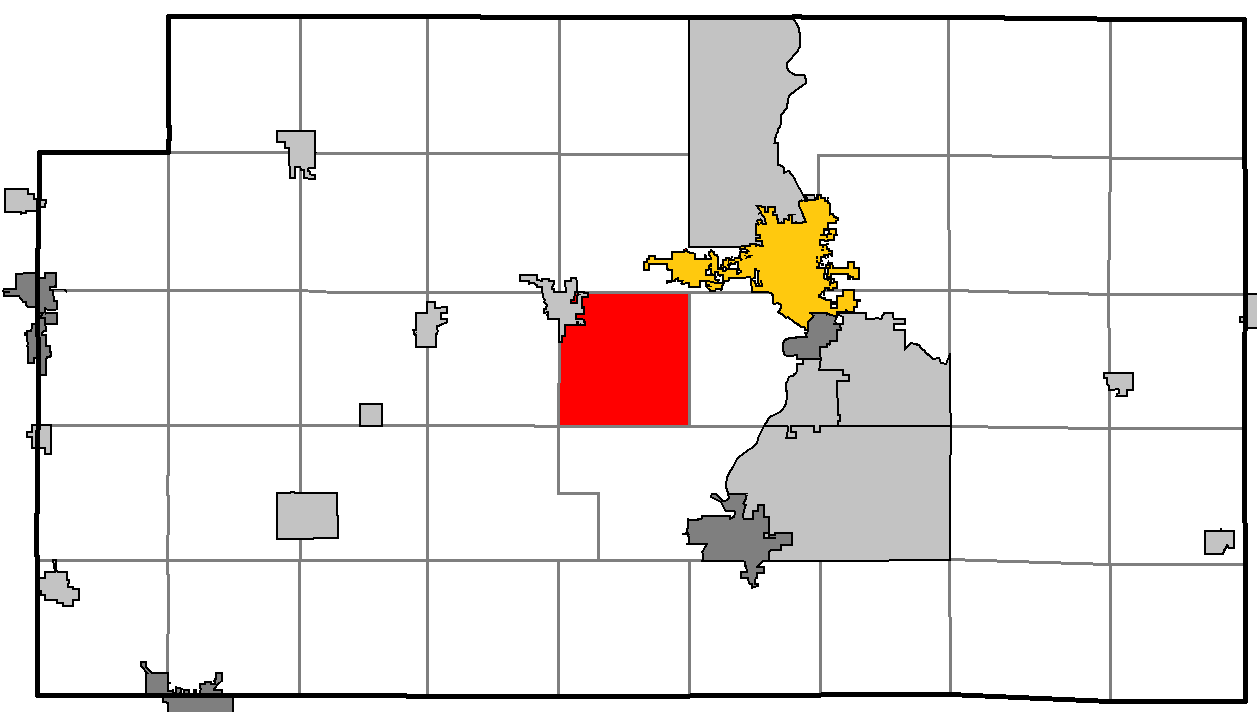
- Location of Marathon, Marathon County

- Location of Marathon County, Wisconsin
- Coordinates: 44°53′39″N 89°46′41″W
- Country: United States
- State: Wisconsin
- County: Marathon

Area
  - Total: 33.1 sq mi (85.6 km^{2})
  - Land: 33.0 sq mi (85.5 km^{2})
  - Water: 0.039 sq mi (0.1 km^{2})
- Elevation: 1,299 ft (396 m)

Population (2020)
  - Total: 995
  - Density: 30.1/sq mi (11.6/km^{2})
- Time zone: UTC-6 (Central (CST))
  - Summer (DST): UTC-5 (CDT)
- Area codes: 715 & 534
- FIPS code: 55-49075
- GNIS feature ID: 1583648
- Website: https://townofmarathonwi.gov/

Marathon is a town in Marathon County, Wisconsin, United States. It is part of the Wausau, Wisconsin, Metropolitan Statistical Area. The population was 995 at the 2020 census. The village of Marathon City was incorporated from a part of the town's original area.

== Geography ==
According to the United States Census Bureau, the town has a total area of 33.0 square miles (85.6 km^{2}), of which 33.0 square miles (85.5 km^{2}) is land and 0.04 square miles (0.1 km^{2}), or 0.09%, is water.

== Demographics ==
As of the census of 2000, there were 1,085 people, 365 households, and 305 families living in the town. The population density was 32.9 people per square mile (12.7/km^{2}). There were 374 housing units at an average density of 11.3 per square mile (4.4/km^{2}). The racial makeup of the town was 99.54% White, 0.09% Native American, 0.28% Asian, 0.09% from other races. Hispanic or Latino of any race were 0.46% of the population.

There were 365 households, out of which 41.6% had children under the age of 18 living with them, 78.1% were married couples living together, 4.7% had a female householder with no husband present, and 16.2% were non-families. 14.5% of all households were made up of individuals, and 5.8% had someone living alone who was 65 years of age or older. The average household size was 2.97 and the average family size was 3.31.

The population was 29.6% under the age of 18, 6.4% from 18 to 24, 29.2% from 25 to 44, 25.0% from 45 to 64, and 9.9% who were 65 years of age or older. The median age was 37 years. For every 100 females, there were 108.3 males. For every 100 females age 18 and over, there were 105.9 males.

The median income for a household in the town was $51,250, and the median income for a family was $57,083. Males had a median income of $35,109 versus $26,184 for females. The per capita income for the town was $18,906. About 4.0% of families and 4.7% of the population were below the poverty line, including 5.9% of those under age 18 and 1.9% of those age 65 or over.

== Notable people ==
- Joseph L. Barber, Wisconsin state senator
- Jerry Dahlke, baseball player
- Theophilus Riesinger, Catholic priest, exorcist and writer
- Claude Taugher, NFL player
- Craig Thompson, graphic novelist
