= Robert Schofield House =

Historic house in Wisconsin, United States

- U.S. National Register of Historic Places
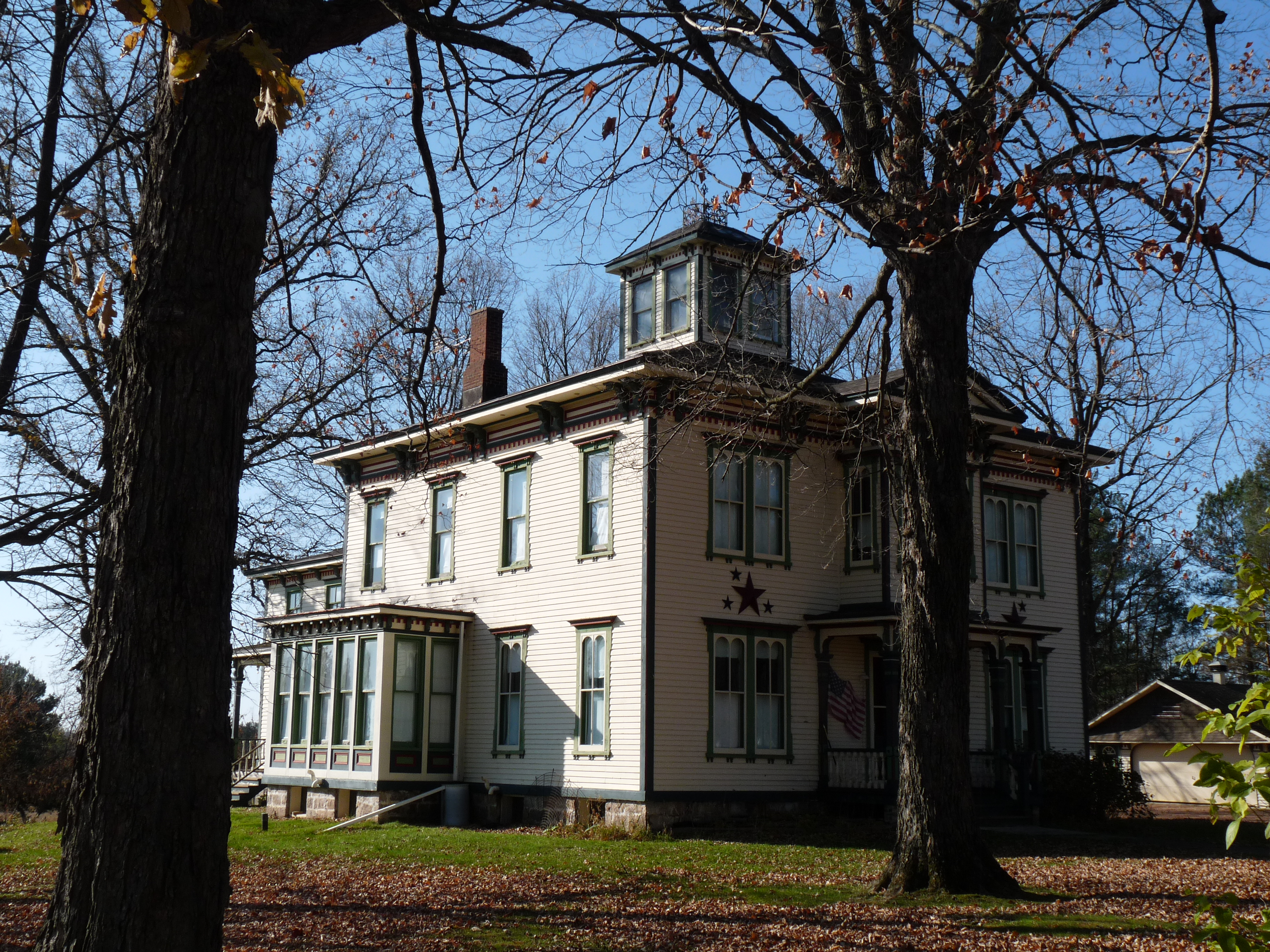
- Robert Schofield House
- Location: 303 W. Schofield Ave., Greenwood, Wisconsin
- Coordinates: 44°45′46″N 90°36′04″W
- Area: 1 acre (0.40 ha)
- Architectural style: Italianate
- NRHP reference No.: 82000643
- Added to NRHP: September 9, 1982

The Robert Schofield House is located in Greenwood, Wisconsin.

== History ==
Robert Schofield was a lumberman and farmer. Among the features of the house are an oak and mahogany elliptical-spiralled staircase and original carbide-glass chandeliers. The house was listed on the National Register of Historic Places in 1982 and on the State Register of Historic Places in 1989.
