= Anthony Gruszka =

American politician

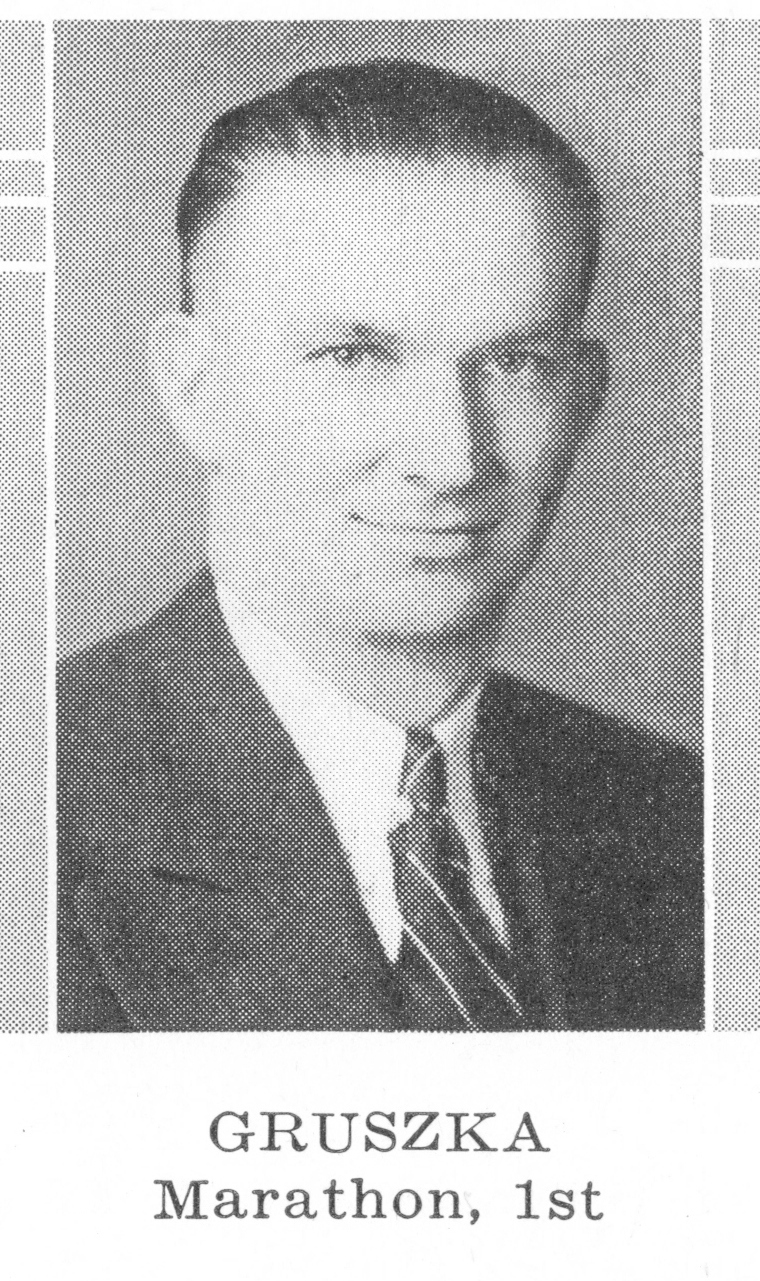
Anthony Gruszka

Anthony Gruszka was a member of the Wisconsin State Assembly.

== Biography ==
Gruszka was born on January 14, 1910, in Milwaukee, Wisconsin. Later, he moved to Mosinee, Wisconsin. He died on November 4, 1972, in La Crosse, Wisconsin.

== Career ==
Gruszka was a member of the Assembly from 1939 to 1940. In 1954, he was a candidate in the Republican primary for the United States House of Representatives from Wisconsin's 4th congressional district. He lost to John C. Schafer.
