= Frank J. Shortner =

American politician and businessman

Frank J. Shortner (November 10, 1890 – April 8, 1968) was an American politician and businessman.

Born in the town of Richfield in Wood County, Wisconsin, Shortner and his family moved to Edgar, Wisconsin in 1900. He was in the real estate, banking, and insurance businesses. He served with the Edgar Volunteer Fire Department and was a justice of the peace. Shortner was President of the Village of Edgar and postmaster of the village. In 1933, Shortner served in the Wisconsin State Assembly as a Democrat.
