= Rib Falls, Wisconsin =

- Town
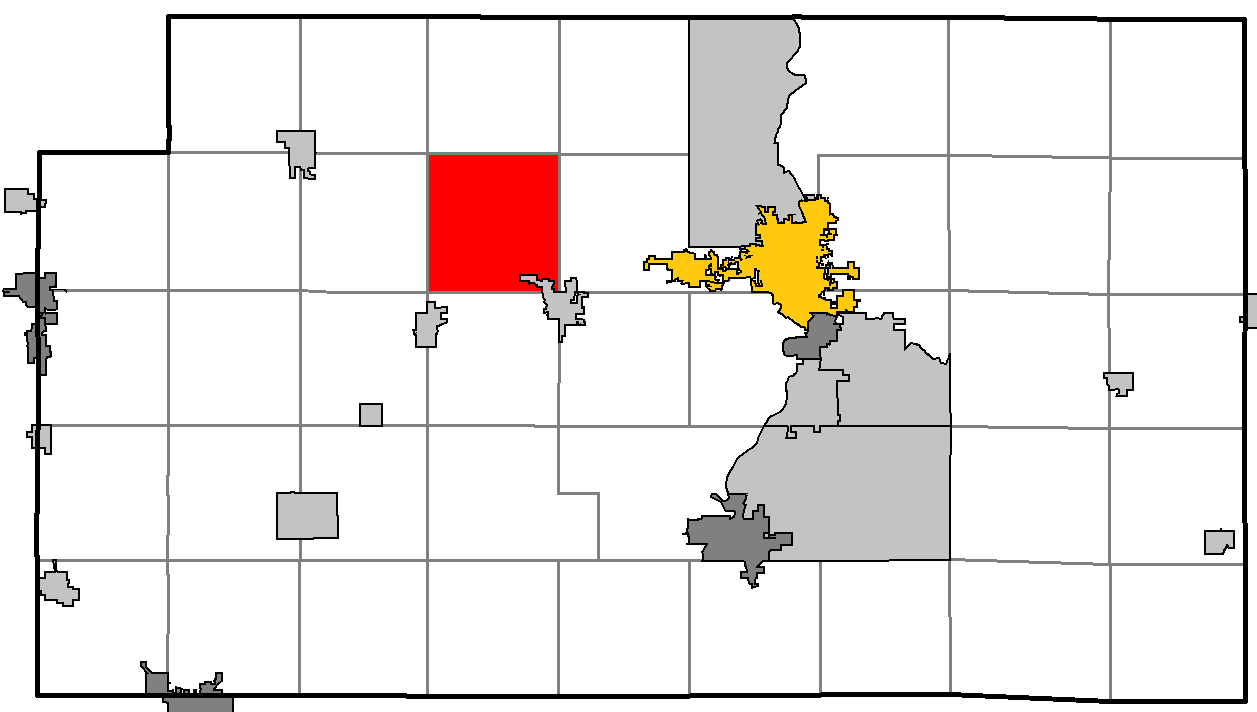
- Location of Rib Falls, Marathon County

- Location of Marathon County, Wisconsin
- Coordinates: 44°58′58″N 89°54′39″W
- Country: United States
- State: Wisconsin
- County: Marathon

Area
  - Total: 35.9 sq mi (93.0 km^{2})
  - Land: 35.9 sq mi (92.9 km^{2})
  - Water: 0.039 sq mi (0.1 km^{2})
- Elevation: 1,306 ft (398 m)

Population (2020)
  - Total: 947
  - Density: 26.4/sq mi (10.2/km^{2})
- Time zone: UTC-6 (Central (CST))
  - Summer (DST): UTC-5 (CDT)
- Area codes: 715 & 534
- FIPS code: 55-67250
- GNIS feature ID: 1584015
- Website: https://www.townofribfalls.com/

Rib Falls is a town in Marathon County, Wisconsin, United States. It is part of the Wausau, WI Metropolitan Statistical Area. The population was 947 at the 2020 census. The unincorporated community of Rib Falls is located in the town.

== Geography ==
According to the United States Census Bureau, the town has a total area of 35.9 square miles (93.0 km^{2}), of which 35.9 square miles (92.9 km^{2}) is land and 0.04 square miles (0.1 km^{2}), or 0.11%, is water.

== Demographics ==
At the 2000 census there were 907 people, 302 households, and 254 families living in the town. The population density was 25.3 people per square mile (9.8/km^{2}). There were 309 housing units at an average density of 8.6 per square mile (3.3/km^{2}). The racial makeup of the town was 99.45% White, 0.11% African American, 0.11% Native American, and 0.33% from two or more races. Hispanic or Latino of any race were 0.33%.

Of the 302 households 41.7% had children under the age of 18 living with them, 75.8% were married couples living together, 3.6% had a female householder with no husband present, and 15.6% were non-families. 13.2% of households were one person and 5.6% were one person aged 65 or older. The average household size was 3.00 and the average family size was 3.29.

The age distribution was 28.2% under the age of 18, 7.5% from 18 to 24, 31.5% from 25 to 44, 22.3% from 45 to 64, and 10.5% 65 or older. The median age was 36 years. For every 100 females, there were 106.1 males. For every 100 females age 18 and over, there were 112.7 males.

The median household income was $50,114 and the median family income was $54,375. Males had a median income of $31,510 versus $21,736 for females. The per capita income for the town was $17,625. About 3.8% of families and 5.0% of the population were below the poverty line, including 4.2% of those under age 18 and 11.7% of those age 65 or over.

== Notable people ==
- Mathias J. Berres, farmer and politician, lived in the town
