= Richfield, Wood County, Wisconsin =

Town of Richfield, Wisconsin
- Town
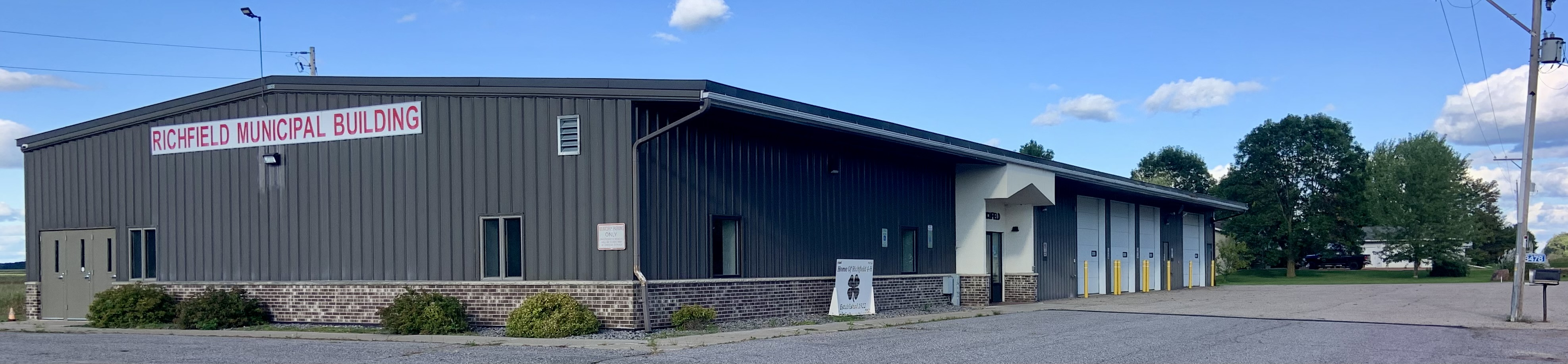
- Town hall

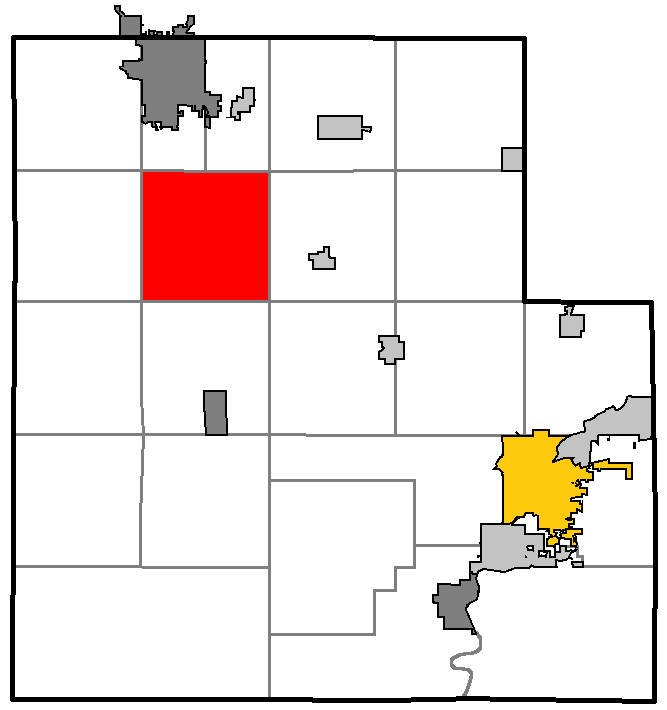
- Location of the Town of Richfield, Wood County, Wisconsin

- Location of Wood County, Wisconsin
- Coordinates: 44°33′18″N 90°09′00″W
- Country: United States
- State: Wisconsin
- County: Wood

Area
  - Total: 34.8 sq mi (90.2 km^{2})
  - Land: 34.8 sq mi (90.1 km^{2})
  - Water: 0.039 sq mi (0.1 km^{2})
- Elevation: 1,158 ft (353 m)

Population (2020)
  - Total: 1,596
  - Density: 45.9/sq mi (17.7/km^{2})
- Time zone: UTC-6 (Central (CST))
  - Summer (DST): UTC-5 (CDT)
- Area codes: 715 & 534
- FIPS code: 55-67500
- GNIS feature ID: 1584023
- PLSS township: T24N R3E
- Website: http://www.townshipofrichfield.com

The Town of Richfield is located in Wood County, Wisconsin, United States. The population was 1,596 at the 2020 census. The unincorporated community of Bethel is located within the town.

== Geography ==
According to the United States Census Bureau, the town has a total area of 34.8 square miles (90.2 km^{2}), of which 34.8 square miles (90.1 km^{2}) is land and 0.04 square mile (0.1 km^{2}) (0.11%) is water.

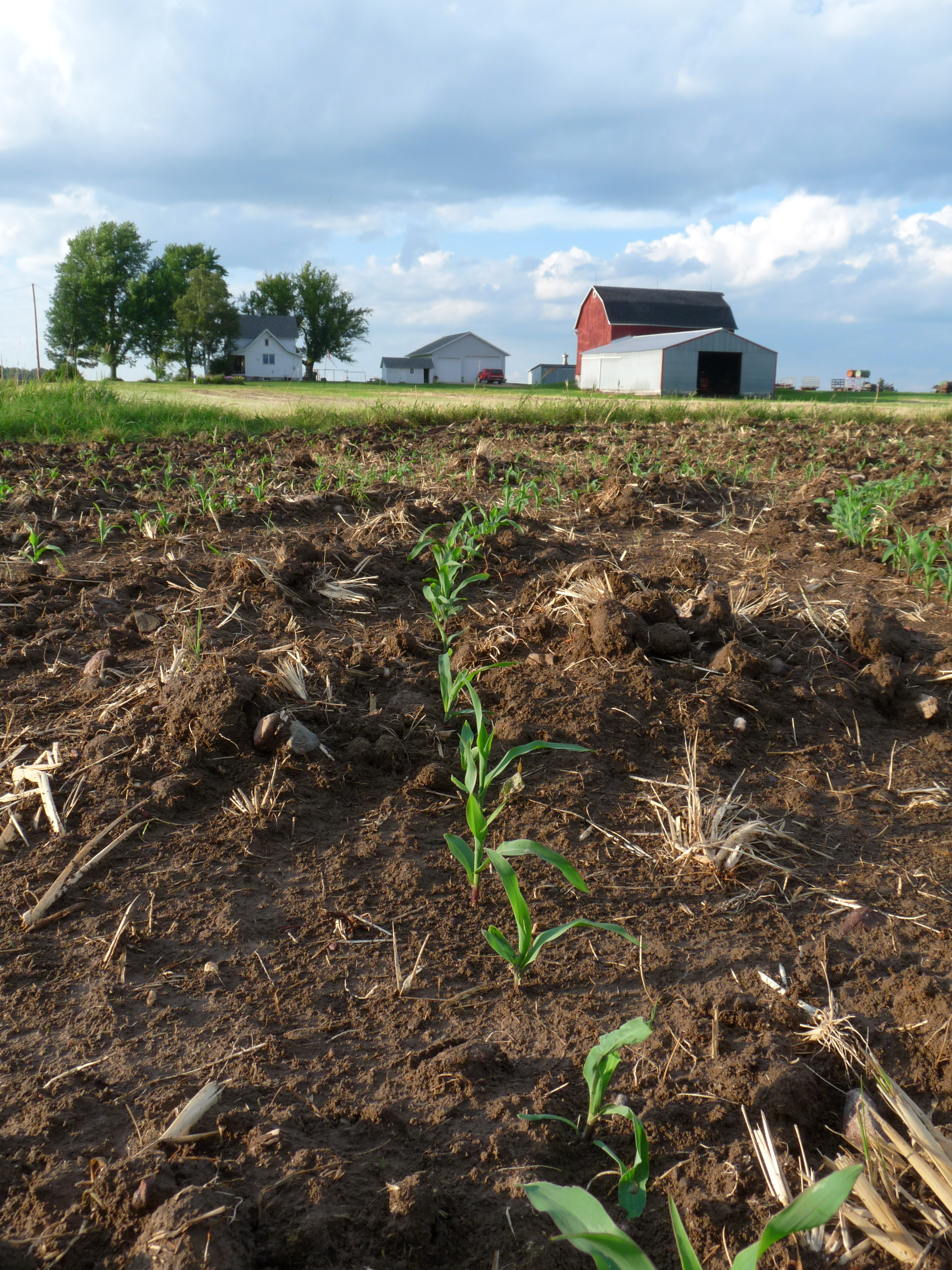
Farm just north of the town center

The Yellow River cuts across the town, heading to join the Wisconsin at Castle Rock Lake. Puff Creek feeds into the Yellow River. Much of the land is fairly low-profile except in the southeast, around Bethel.

== History ==
Before white contact, the area that would become Richfield lay near the border of Ojibwe, Ho-Chunk and Menominee territory.

The outline of the six-mile square that would become Richfield was first surveyed in the summer of 1851 by a crew working for the U.S. government. That October a different crew of surveyors marked all the section corners in the township, walking through the woods and swamps, measuring with chain and compass.

An 1858 map of Wood County showed a "County Road" following the future course of U.S. 10 to the northwest corner of what would become Richfield and headed southeast to Grand Rapids. Part way through the town, a predecessor of Puff Creek Boulevard branched off heading south to some mills downstream on the Yellow River, including Pitt's Mill - the forerunner of Pittsville.

The Town of Richfield was established in 1881.

By around 1893, parts of the town were filling in with settlers. A predecessor of County A reached from the south end of the town to near the north end, with a predecessor of N heading east to Arpin. A predecessor of EE was in place, and some other segments in the north and west. Settlers were sprinkled along the roads and schools were shown near the future Bethel, a mile south of the future Richfield center, and where EE would meet A and 13. Away from the roads, much of the land was still in large blocks, owned by outfits like Lyman Lumber Co, Necedah Lumber Co, Johnson, Reitbrock & Halsey, and John Arpin Lumber Co.

A map from around 1902 shows the modern road grid largely complete, with only one or two-mile segments missing here and there. These were dusty wagon roads - not the raised, paved roads of today. Settler/farmers were thick in the northwest and in the southeast around Bethel. A post office was marked at Bethel on the plat map, along with Woodland Academy. A town hall was marked at the site of Richfield's modern town hall, with a creamery across the road. Another creamery was just outside Richfield at Klondike corners. A church had been added at the junction of the future EE and Washington. Much of the large blocks of land had been divided and sold to farmers, though Reitbrock still held some large chunks. Two railroads crossed the northeast corner of Richfield, running from Wisconsin Rapids to Marshfield: the Wisconsin Central and the Chicago & Northwestern.

The 1909 plat map showed some details of the buildings at Bethel Academy, and noted a blacksmith shop a mile to the east. New schools had appeared where modern 80 meets N and where modern T meets EE.

The 1920 plat map showed more of the same pattern: lots of 80 and 40-acre farms, more roads, and smaller lots around Bethel. The road that would become County N didn't cross the Yellow River, and the future T still had a gap north of Bethel.

By the 1956 plat map the modern road grid was complete and the Bethel Academy had been replaced by "Bethel Conv. Home."

== Demographics ==
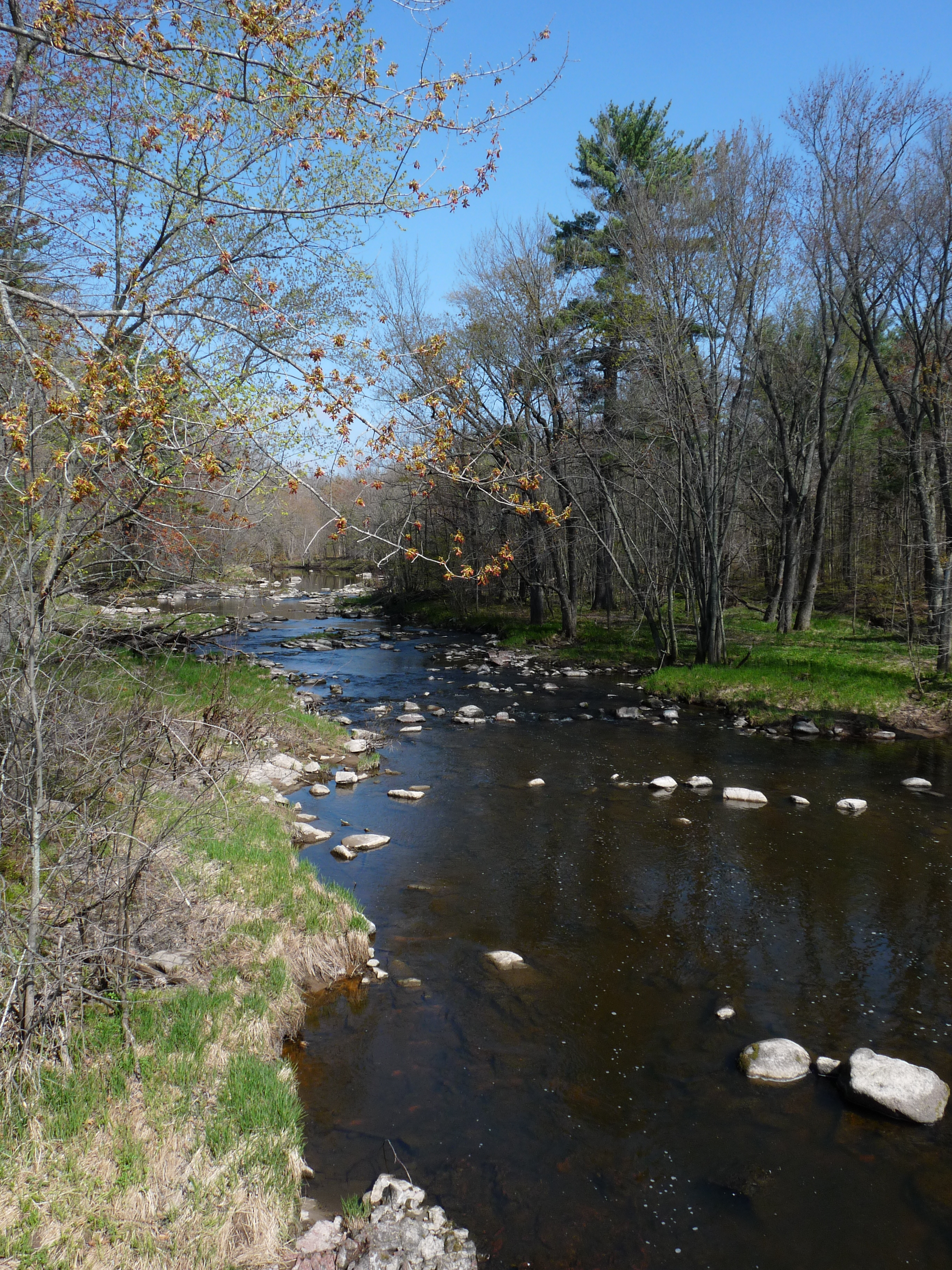
Yellow River, from County N

As of the census of 2000, there were 1,523 people, 473 households, and 383 families residing in the town. The population density was 43.8 people per square mile (16.9/km^{2}). There were 485 housing units at an average density of 13.9 per square mile (5.4/km^{2}). The racial makeup of the town was 98.03% White, 0.13% African American, 0.13% Native American, 1.64% Asian, and 0.07% from two or more races.

There were 473 households, out of which 41.2% had children under the age of 18 living with them, 71.7% were married couples living together, 5.1% had a female householder with no husband present, and 19.0% were non-families. 14.0% of all households were made up of individuals, and 5.3% had someone living alone who was 65 years of age or older. The average household size was 2.98 and the average family size was 3.26.

In the town, the population was spread out, with 27.8% under the age of 18, 6.5% from 18 to 24, 29.1% from 25 to 44, 21.2% from 45 to 64, and 15.4% who were 65 years of age or older. The median age was 36 years. For every 100 females, there were 95.3 males. For every 100 females age 18 and over, there were 100.7 males.

The median income for a household in the town was $47,188, and the median income for a family was $51,765. Males had a median income of $30,338 versus $24,643 for females. The per capita income for the town was $18,775. About 4.5% of families and 8.5% of the population were below the poverty line, including 11.1% of those under age 18 and 4.6% of those age 65 or over.

== Notable people ==
- Frank J. Shortner, Wisconsin businessman and legislator, was born in the town
