= UC Riverside School of Business =

- Type: Public
- Established: 1970
- Dean: Yunzeng Wang
- Location: Riverside, CA, United States
- Campus: Suburban
- Website: business.ucr.edu

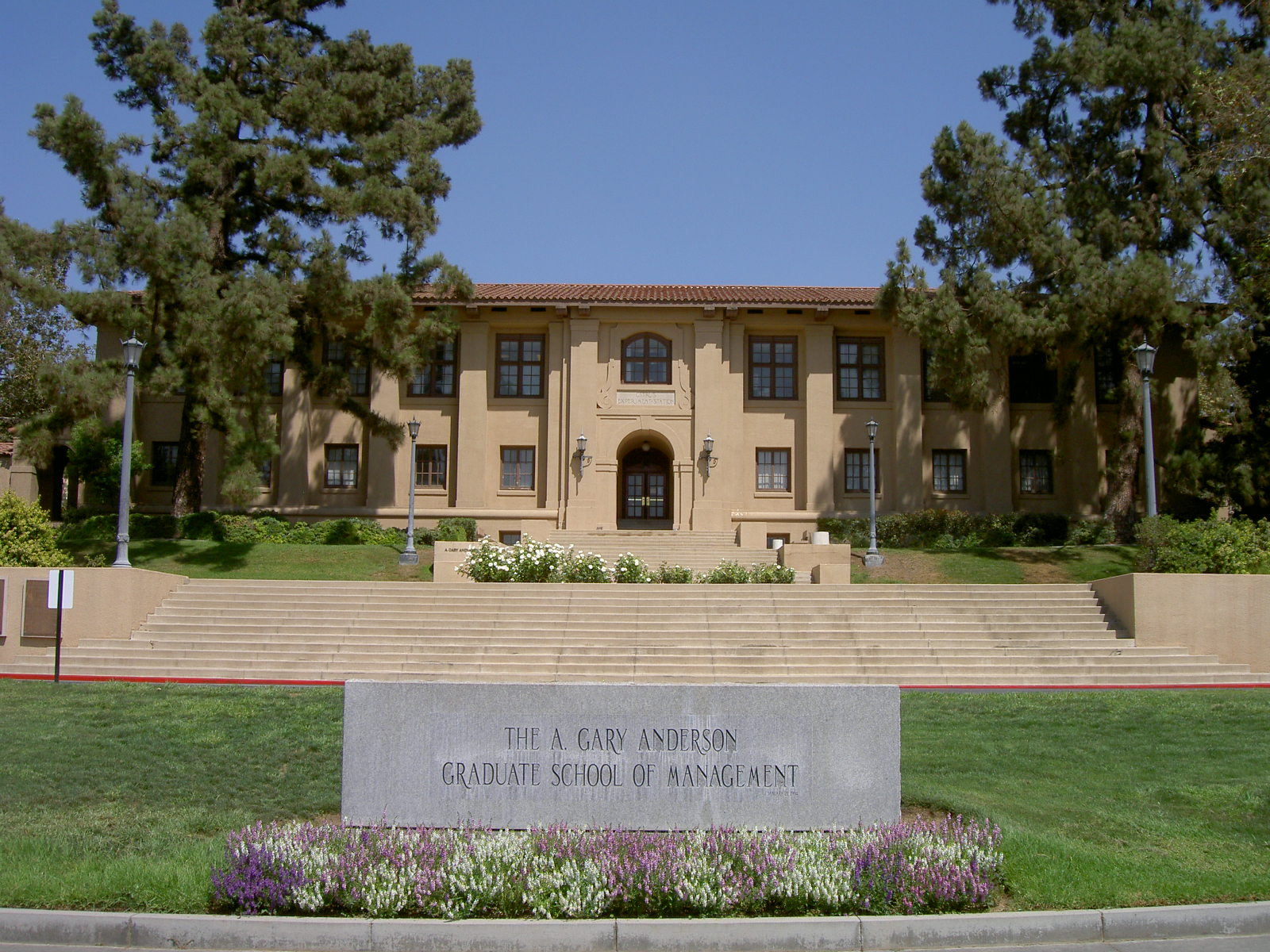
The original 1917 structure of the UC Citrus Experiment Station now houses the A. Gary Anderson Graduate School of Management at the UCR School of Business.

The UC Riverside School of Business is the business school of the University of California, Riverside. The school's graduate education unit is the A. Gary Anderson Graduate School of Management.

== Overview ==
Leveraging its location in Inland Southern California as one of the fastest growing regions in the United States, the School's brand identity is tied to the development and management of growth, and uses the tagline "Leading Thinkers Leading Growth."

The school's 2008-2013 strategic plan identifies five "spires of excellence" that represent areas of academic distinction for the School. These five spires include: (1) auditing and assurance, (2) empirical finance, (3) supply chain management, (4) Web commerce, and (5) behavioral decision research.

Annually, the UCR School of Business enrolls over 1,000 students

== Distinctions ==
In 2003, School of Business was accredited by the Association to Advance Collegiate Schools of Business (AACSB).

In 2007, Entrepreneur Magazine and the Princeton Review included the school among the top 25 graduate programs in entrepreneurship.

In 2010, U.S. News & World Report ranked the SoBA undergraduate business program in a tie for 67th among all undergraduate business programs and in a tie for 41st among undergraduate business programs within public universities.

In 2010 and 2011, the Princeton Review included SoBA as one of its Best 301/300 Business Schools.

In 2011, Business Week ranked the school’s undergraduate program for the first time, placing it among only six programs in California (only three public) that were ranked.

In 2011, U.S. News & World Report ranked the SoBA undergraduate business program 32nd among all public universities and 55th among all universities nationwide (for its 2012 rankings).

In 2011, the Princeton Review included SoBA as one of its Best 294 Business Schools for 2012.

In 2012, U.S. News & World Report ranked the SoBA undergraduate business program 33rd among all public universities and 56th among all universities nationwide (for its 2013 rankings).

In 2012, the Princeton Review included SoBA as one of its Best 296 Business Schools for 2013.

In 2010, SoBA revived its annual economic forecast, in partnership with Beacon Economics. The 2011 forecast conference was themed "The Future of Jobs in Inland Southern California."

== History ==
UCR first established the Graduate School of Administration in 1970. The school was subsequently renamed the Graduate School of Management in 1982. In 1994, the A. Gary Anderson Family Foundation donated $5 million to the school, which was renamed the A. Gary Anderson Graduate School of Management. In 2008, the school was renamed the School of Business Administration, housing both the undergraduate business program and the A. Gary Anderson Graduate School of Management. In 2018, the school's name was shortened to the School of Business.

== Faculty ==
The School of Business has several areas: accounting and information systems, finance, management, marketing, and supply chain management. Faculty include:

- Ted Mock – 2011 American Accounting Association Accounting Educator of the Year
- Richard Smith – co-author of Entrepreneurial Finance: Strategy, Valuation, and Deal Structure

== Programs ==
=== Undergraduate business ===
The School of Business offers a B.S. in business administration program, which was founded in 1984. Total undergraduate enrollment as of 2011 is 18,242.

The School of Business has the largest undergraduate business program in the UC system.

In 2010, U.S. News & World Report ranked the SoBA undergraduate business program in the top 5 percentile.

=== MBA ===
The MBA program launched in 1983. Offered in the A. Gary Anderson Graduate School of Management, the MBA program enrolls about 80 students per year as of 2011. The degree is STEM-certified, allowing international students to work in the United States for up to 36 months.

In 2010, MBA student interns participated in the first ever study of foreign direct investment in Riverside County. They worked with the Office of Foreign Trade at the Riverside County Economic Development Agency.

=== Ph.D. ===
A Ph.D. in Business Administration program launched fall 2011, and is interdisciplinary, focusing on management and marketing. The first cohort consisted of six students.

=== Master of Professional Accountancy (MPAc) ===
A Master of Professional Accountancy (MPAc) program was launched in fall 2012. This program builds a career in accounting through advanced education in audit and assurance, taxation, accounting information systems and ethics. It prepares students with the knowledge to meet the State of California Board of Accountancy education standards required for the Certified Public Accountant exam.

=== Master of Finance (MFin) ===
A Master of Finance (MFin) is offered to provide the essential financial acumen students need to impact and lead the financial management industry. It builds financial analysis skills that can be applied to national and international careers in corporate finance, investment banking and risk management. The program allows students to concentrate in one of three areas of specialization: finance analytics, marketing analytics, or operations analytics. The degree is STEM-certified, allowing international students to work in the United States for up to 36 months.

=== Master of Science in Business Analytics (MSBA) ===
A Master of Science in Business Analytics (MSBA) will be launched in fall 2021. The program allows students to concentrate in one of three areas of specialization: finance analytics, marketing analytics, or operations analytics. The degree is STEM-certified, allowing international students to work in the United States for up to 36 months.

=== Executive MBA ===
In 2009, the UCR School of Business launched an Executive MBA program. Typical applicants to the 21-month program have seven to 10 years of career experience minimum. The first cohort was composed of managers in finance, distribution, a CPA, and physicians. The program enrolled about 20-25 students per year.

Students meet on alternating weekends at the UCR Palm Desert Graduate Center, and are required to attend a week-long residency and an international study trip. In 2010, the EMBA cohort traveled to Shanghai for its international residency.

== See also ==
- List of University of California, Riverside people
