= René Ménard =

Canadian explorer

The Reverend René Ménard SJ
- Born: March 2, 1605; Paris, Kingdom of France
- Disappeared: Wisconsin, U.S.
- Status: Missing for 365 years, 4 months and 18 days
- Occupation: Jesuit missionary
- Known for: Mysterious disappearance

René Ménard (2 March 1605 – ca. 4 July 1661) was a French Jesuit missionary explorer who traveled to New France in 1641, learned the language of the Wendat, and was soon in charge of many of the satellite missions around Sainte-Marie among the Hurons. Ménard also worked with the Haudenosaunee, and was said to speak six Indian dialects. He survived the continuous attacks from the Haudenosaunee on the Wendat and disappeared in 1661.

== Biography ==
René Ménard was born in Paris on 2 March 1605. He joined the Jesuits there on 7 September 1624. After the usual course of studies at La Flèche, Bourges, and Orleans, he set out from Dieppe in the beginning of May 1640. Arriving at Québec he was assigned to work among the Wendat, laboring first, however, among the Nippissings. From 1651 to 1656 he was the superior at Trois-Rivières. From 1656 to 1658 he was a missioner to the Cayuga, and later to the Oneida.

In 1660, Ménard was sent west from Montreal with a trading party of Ottawa and the fur traders Radisson and Groseilliers, heading for what is now northern Wisconsin, aiming to establish a mission among the Ottawa. The 55-year-old Ménard didn't expect to return. The night before departure he wrote to a friend,

In three or four months you may include me in the Memento for the dead, in view of the kind of life led by these peoples, of my age, and of my delicate constitution. In spite of that, I have felt such powerful promptings and have seen in this affair so little of the purely natural, that I could not doubt if I failed to respond to this opportunity that I should experience an endless remorse.

Leaving Trois-Rivières, Québec at the end of August, they paddled for six weeks up the St. Lawrence, up the Ottawa River, and across Georgian Bay. The party didn't go easy on the frail Ménard. Separated from the French traders and his assistant, he was forced to paddle continuously and carry heavy loads with meager rations. When they passed Sault Ste. Marie into Lake Superior, Ménard had penetrated further into the Great Lakes region than any Western official before. After his party's canoe was destroyed by a falling tree in mid-October, Ménard wintered with some Ottawas at Keweenaw Bay near what is now L'Anse, Michigan. He sheltered in a hut he made of tree branches and at times he subsisted on fish begged from the Indians and boiled moss. Despite the hardships and resistance from many Indians, he baptized and taught the Christian faith.

In the spring he heard that a band of Wendat in the interior was starving, and he set off to minister to them, though he himself had only a bag of sturgeon and some dried meat. He and a fur trader nicknamed L'Esperance walked and canoed down into what is believed to be present-day Taylor County in north central Wisconsin. At a rapids a day's journey from the Wendat village, Ménard, now weak with hunger himself, became separated from his companion, and disappeared. His cassock and breviary were later found among the Dakotas. A roadside sign in Iron County, Michigan, along the Michigamme River claims Ménard died there on 4 July 1661. A granite monument in Lincoln County, Wisconsin, indicates that he disappeared while portaging around Bill Cross Rapids in the nearby Wisconsin River.

Bishop François de Laval of Québec wrote of Ménard and the fur traders, "Seven Frenchmen attached themselves to this Apostle, they to catch beavers, he to gain souls."

== See also ==
- Black Robe, a novel that portrays the world through which Ménard moved
- List of people who disappeared mysteriously (pre-1910)
