= Mathias J. Berres =

American politician and farmer (1863–1954)

Mathias J. "Matt" Berres (November 20, 1863 – December 7, 1954) was an American politician and farmer.

Born in West Bend, Wisconsin, Berres moved with his parents to the town of Rib Falls in Marathon County, Wisconsin. He worked in the lumber industry and sawmills before settling on a farm in Rib Falls. He served as chairman and clerk of the Rib Falls Town Board, justice of the peace, school board clerk, and chairman of the Marathon County Board of Supervisors. Berres served in the Wisconsin State Assembly in 1927 and was a Republican.

He was married on June 17, 1890 to Miss Agnes Hettig from Marathon County. They raised ten children. After their marriage Mr. and Ms. Berres moved to Marshfield, WI, where he worked as a carpenter for three years. When the panic of 1893 caused a widespread business depression he returned to the old homestead at Rib Falls. He had sixty acres and raised high grade Holstein cattle for dairy purposes. As a carpenter and contractor Mr. Berres built many of the most substantial buildings at Poniatowski and in the vicinity.
