= A. Gary Anderson Graduate School of Management =

School at the University of California, Riverside

Coordinates: 33.969845°N 117.326027°W

The A. Gary Anderson Graduate School of Management
- Type: Public
- Established: 1970
- Location: Riverside, CA, USA
- Campus: Suburban
- Website: business.ucr.edu

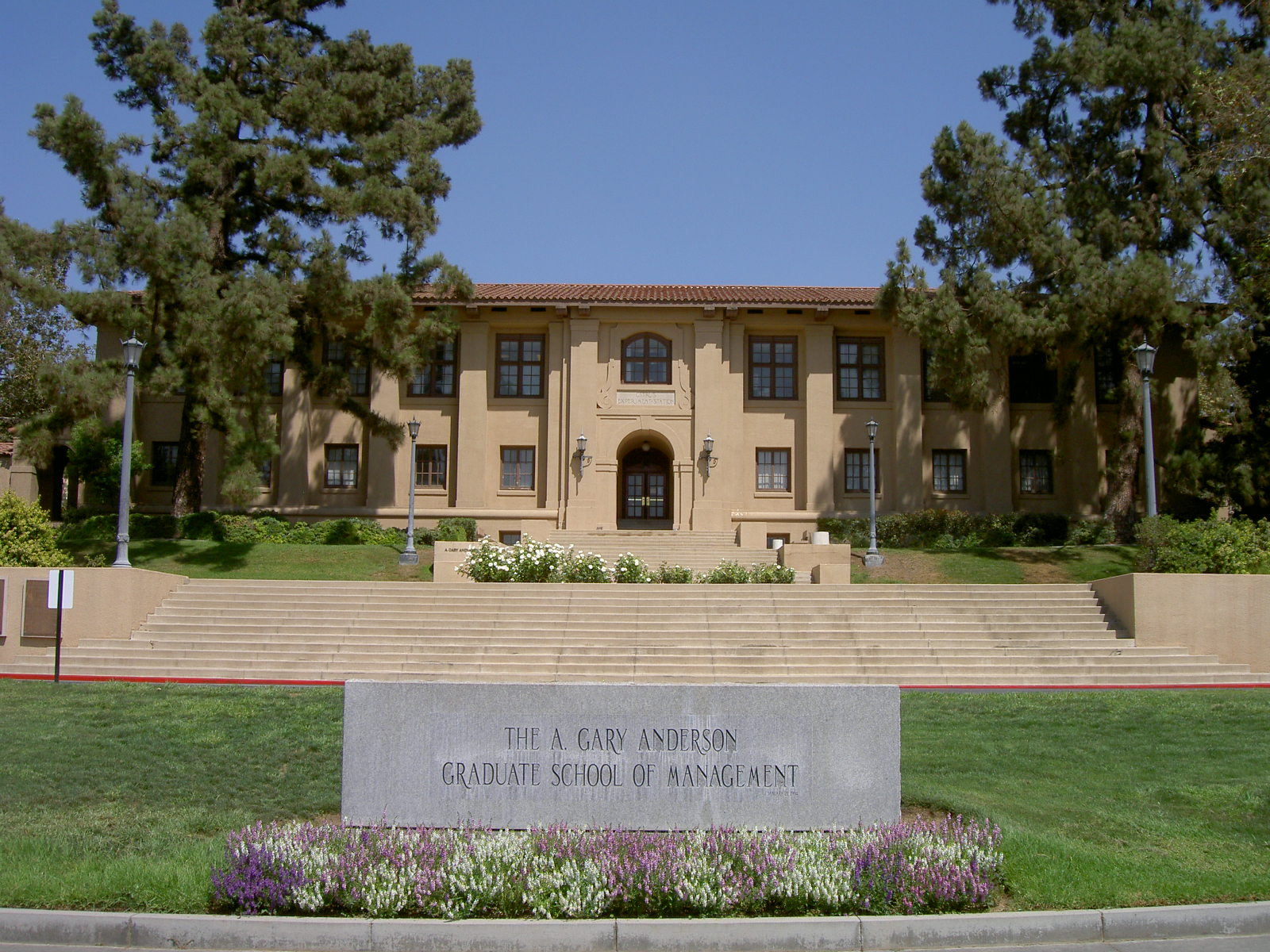
The original 1917 structure of the UC Citrus Experiment Station now houses the A. Gary Anderson Graduate School of Management at the UCR School of Business.

The A. Gary Anderson Graduate School of Management is a part of the UCR School of Business located at the University of California, Riverside. Current offerings include MBA, Ph.D., Master of Finance and Master of Professional Accountancy (MPAc) programs.

== History ==
UCR first established the Graduation School of Administration in 1970. The school was subsequently renamed the Graduate School of Management in 1982. In 1994, the A. Gary Anderson Family Foundation donated $5 million to the school, which was renamed the A. Gary Anderson Graduate School of Management. In 2008, the school was renamed the School of Business, housing both the undergraduate business program and the A. Gary Anderson Graduate School of Management.

== Programs ==
=== MBA Program ===
The MBA program launched in 1983. Offered in the A. Gary Anderson Graduate School of Management, the MBA program enrolls about 80 students per year as of 2011.

In 2010, MBA student interns participated in the first ever study of foreign direct investment in Riverside County. They worked with the Office of Foreign Trade at the Riverside County Economic Development Agency.

=== Ph.D. Program ===
The Ph.D. Program launched in Fall 2011. The program is interdisciplinary, focusing on management and marketing. The first cohort is composed of six students.

=== Master of Professional Accountancy (MPAc) Program ===
A Master of Professional Accountancy (MPAc) program was approved for launch in Fall 2012.

=== Executive MBA Program ===
In 2009, SoBA launched an Executive MBA program. Typical applicants to the 21-month program have seven to 10 years of career experience minimum. The first cohort was composed of managers in finance, distribution, a CPA, and physicians. The program enrolls about 20-25 students per year.

Students meet on alternating weekends at the UCR Palm Desert Graduate Center, and are required to attend a week-long residency and an international study trip.

== Rankings ==
The Anderson School was ranked 90th in Best Business School, and the part-time MBA program was ranked 73th by U.S. News & World Report. It was listed in the Princeton Reviews's Best Business Schools (West) in 2023.

== See also ==
- List of University of California, Riverside people
