= Nicholas Schmidt =

American politician

Nicholas Schmidt [sometimes called Nicolas or Nic] (November 1860 - ?) was an American machinist, merchant, banker and brewer from Marathon City, Wisconsin who served three terms as a Democratic member of the Wisconsin State Assembly.

== Background ==
Schmidt was born in the Rhine Province of the Kingdom of Prussia in November 1860, son of Nicholas and Margaret Schmidt, and attended public school, but not high school. While training as a locksmith and machinist he attended night school to make up for his lack of a high school education. He traveled extensively in Europe while working in his trade before emigrating to the United States in 1880 alone, leaving behind his parents and four sisters (the youngest of whom later came to the United States and lived in Minnesota). His first home in the U.S. was in West Point, Nebraska, where he worked for six months. Homesick, he started to return to his homeland; but upon reaching Chicago, friends there persuaded him to remain there, working at his trade and again attending night school (to master the English language), until 1887, when a work accident left him with a damaged shoulder blade which made it impossible for him to continue work as a machinist, and he was forced to seek other work. He spent six years "in the flour, feed, coal and wood business" in Chicago, and later sold real estate there.

While in Chicago Schmidt married at Chicago Mary Friedl, who died there, after having borne four children: Frederick M., Charles N., Thomas E., and Arthur, who was to die at Marathon City at the age of eleven. On May 2, 1899, Schmidt remarried to one Berta Gunjen, like himself a native of Germany.

== Move to Wisconsin ==
In 1902 he bought the Marathon City Brewery; he moved to Marathon City and took control of the brewery in September of that year. In 1905 it became a public company, but he remained as president, treasurer and manager until December 31, 1910, when he gave up the management of the business for health reasons. During this time he helped organizing the State Bank of Marathon City, of which he was the first president, remaining so until December, 1911. He was one of the main organizers of the Marathon City Telephone Company and was like its first president, and also help organize the Marathon Excelsior Manufacturing Company and the Marathon Lumber Company. By 1913, his role in each of these companies was primarily as a stockholder.

== Public office ==
He served the village as a member of the board of trustees for five years.

In 1906 he was elected to the Assembly from the first Marathon County district (the Towns of Bergen, Berlin, Brighton, Cassel, Cleveland, Day, Eau Pleine, Emmet, Frankfort, Halsey, Hamburg, Holton, Hull, Johnson, Maine, McMillan, Marathon, Mosinee, Rib Falls, Rietbrock, Spencer, Stettin and Wien; the Villages of Edgar, Marathon, McMillan, Mosinee; and the east ward of Colby), succeeding Republican Fred Prehn (who was not a candidate), with 1642 votes to 1,489 votes for Republican A. E. Beebe and 55 for Social Democrat A. F. Becker.

He was re-elected in 1908 and 1910, and in 1912 was the Democratic nominee for State Treasurer, losing with 154,097 votes to 178,321 for Republican Henry Johnson, 35,195 for Social Democrat Henry Ammann, 8696 for Prohibitionist Thomas Edwards, and 2985 for Socialist Labor candidate Nicholas Semmelhack. His Assembly seat was taken by Republican Francis X. Schilling.

== After public office ==
By 1913, his role in each of his companies was primarily as a stockholder. He and Berta were members of St. Mary's Catholic church at Marathon City. He was a member of the Catholic Order of Foresters and two other societies referred to as "the Germania" and the "National Union".
