= Fred Prehn =

American politician (1860–1932)

- Born: May 5, 1860
- Died: 1932 (aged 71–72)
- Occupation: Harness maker

Fred Prehn (1860-1932) was an American harnessmaker and merchant from Marathon City, Wisconsin, who served one term in the Wisconsin State Assembly.

== Background ==
Prehn was born on May 5, 1860, in the city of Manitowoc, son of Theodore and Fredrika Prehn, of German American ancestry. He was brought up on a farm in that county; received his education in public schools in Newton, Wisconsin, and attended Manitowoc High School. He learned the trade of harness making and saddlery, working first in Marinette, then Green Bay and later in Milwaukee. In 1881 he moved to Marathon City to work at his trade. He opened a harnessmaker shop, soon afterward adding the sale of implements for farm use to his harness line and still later adding hardware, furniture and undertaking.

== Public office ==
Prehn, an active member of the Republican Party, was appointed postmaster of Marathon City in 1889 under President Benjamin Harrison, holding that office until 1893. He served as president of his village for three years, served on the county board of supervisors for two years and on the village school board for three.

Prahn was elected to the Assembly in 1904 from the 1st Marathon County district (the Towns of Bergen, Berlin, Brighton, Cassel, Cleveland, Day, Eau Pleine, Emmet, Frankfort, Halsey, Hamburg, Holton, Hull, Johnson, Maine, McMillan, Marathon, Mosinee, Rib Falls, Rietbrock, Spencer, Stettin and Wien; the Villages of Edgar, Marathon, McMillan, Mosinee; and the east ward of Colby), receiving 2,354 votes against 2,145 for the incumbent, Democrat Willis F. La Du.

He was not a candidate for re-election in 1906, and was succeeded by Democrat Nic Schmidt.

== After the Assembly ==
Prehn's two-story store building caught fire in 1905. The building and contents were under-insured, and he lost more than three-quarters of their value. Prehn went into business with his son Edwin in another store in Marathon City. As of 1913, their firm also owned a farm of 240 acres in Jackson County.

He was a Lutheran and a member of the Modern Woodmen of America.

Prehn was married first to Bentenia Langenhahn, a native of Germany; she died in Marathon City at the age of 26. They had four children: Helen, Arthur W., Edwin R., and Ella. Prehn's second marriage was to Emma Erdman, of the town of Stettin. As of 1913, they had six children: Benjamin, Delos, Fred, Douglass, Gerlinda and Aurora. They had an adopted daughter, Levina Clemens, whom they adopted when she was three years old.

Prehn died from heart disease in Wausau, Wisconsin, in 1932. His son Arthur would become District Attorney of Marathon County and Wisconsin Republican State Central Committeeman.
