= Gęsicki =

Gęsicki/ Gesicki (Polish pronunciation: [ɡɛɲˈɕit͡s.kʲi], feminine: Gęsicka/ Gesicka, plural: Gęsiccy) is a Polish surname, it could be associated with the Korwin, Suchekomnaty Ślepowron coat of arms. Notable people with the name include:

- Andrzej Gęsicki (died 1701), Polish nobleman
- Grażyna Gęsicka (1951–2010), Polish sociologist and politician
- Leo Gesicki (1891–1961), American politician and businessman
- Marian Gęsicki (born 1953), Polish runner
- Mike Gesicki (born 1995), American football tight end
- Weronika Gęsicka, visual artist, 2019 Paszport Polityki award winner
- Zbigniew Gęsicki (1919–1944), Polish soldier, Operation Kutschera
