= Mosinee =

Mosinee may refer to:

- Mosinee, Wisconsin
- Mosinee (town), Wisconsin
