= Bertha Züricher =

Swiss artist (1869–1949)

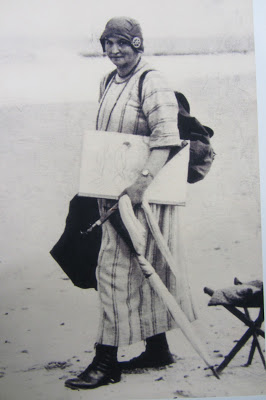
- Born: 20 March 1869; Bern, Switzerland
- Died: 7 October 1949 (aged 80); Bern, Switzerland
- Occupation: painter

Bertha Züricher or Berthe Zuricker (20 March 1869 – 7 October 1949) was a Swiss author, painter and engraver.

== Life ==
Züricher was born in Bern on 20 March 1869.

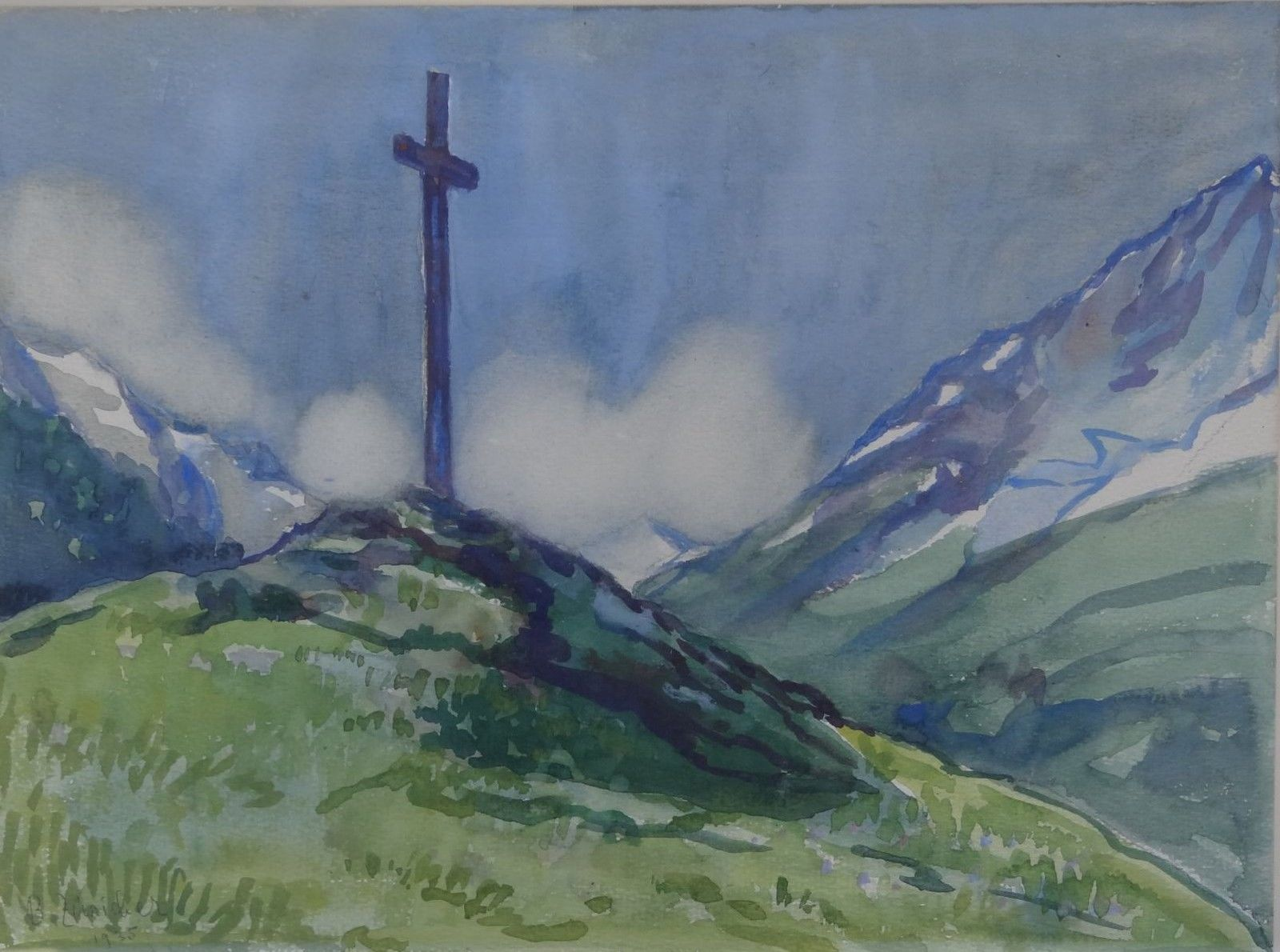
Her 1935 painting "summit cross"

She was known for her paintings and engravings of genre scenes, landscapes and figures, but she was also a writer.

Züricher's paintings were exhibited at the Société Nationale des Beaux-Arts in Paris. In November 1904 Ambroise Vollard chose her paintings of flowers and fruits to be exhibited.

In 1928 Züricher published Postkarte, Herrn Wartman.

== Death and legacy ==
Züricher died in 1949 in Bern. She was given a large retrospective exhibition in the year after she died.

Paintings in Bern collections are Hunter on the Look-out and In the Cradle. In 2004, Kurt Jakob Egli wrote Bertha Züricher: Leben und Werk der Berner Malerin.

In 2012 there was a retrospective exhibition of her work at Archivarte Galerie im Breitenrain.
