= Herman Hedrich =

American politician (1849–1929)

Member of the Wisconsin State Assembly
- In office 1917

Personal details
- Born: December 21, 1849 Stanau, Saxe-Weimar-Eisenach, German Confederation
- Died: November 12, 1929 (aged 79) Abbotsford, Wisconsin, U.S.
- Party: Republican
- Occupation: Politician, farmer

Herman Hedrich (December 21, 1849 – November 12, 1929) was an American politician and farmer.

Born in Stanau, Saxe-Weimar-Eisenach, German Confederation, Hedrick and his parents emigrated to the United States in 1852 and settled on a farm in the Town of Mosel in Sheboygan County, Wisconsin. Hedrich then bought land in the Town of Rantoul, Calumet County, Wisconsin, in 1868, and started a farm. During that time, Hedrich was chairman of the Rantoul Town Board and served on the Calumet County Board of Supervisors. He also served as school district clerk. In 1900, Hedrich moved to the Town of Holton, Marathon County, Wisconsin to a dairy farm near Dorchester, Wisconsin. He served as chairman of the Holton Town Board and on the Marathon County Board of Supervisors and was a Republican. In 1908, Hedrich retired. In 1917, Hedrich served in the Wisconsin State Assembly from Marathon County, Wisconsin. He purchased a house in Abbotsford, Wisconsin and died there.
