= Dreba =

- Ortsteil of Neustadt an der Orla
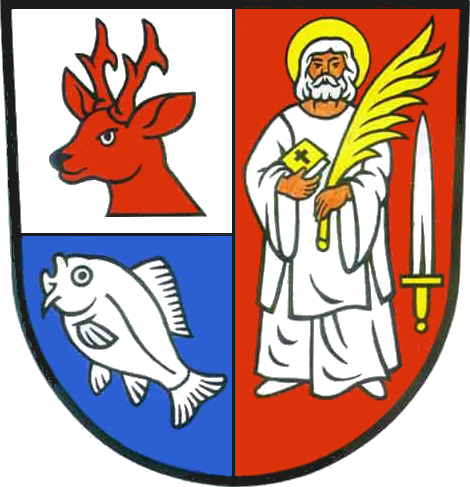
- Coat of arms
- Interactive map of Dreba
- Location within Germany Location within Thuringia
- Coordinates: 50°40′N 11°45′E
- Country: Germany
- State: Thuringia
- District: Saale-Orla-Kreis
- Town: Neustadt an der Orla

Area
  - Total: 12.47 km^{2} (4.81 sq mi)
- Elevation: 460 m (1,510 ft)

Population (2018-12-31)
  - Total: 233
  - Density: 18.7/km^{2} (48.4/sq mi)
- Time zone: UTC+01:00 (CET)
  - Summer (DST): UTC+02:00 (CEST)
- Postal codes: 07806
- Dialling codes: 036484
- Website: www.dreba-online.de

Dreba (German pronunciation: [ˈdʁeːba]) is a village and a former municipality in the district Saale-Orla-Kreis, in Thuringia, Germany. Since December 2019, it is part of the town Neustadt an der Orla.
