= Johann Ernst Hebenstreit =

German physician and naturalist (1703–1757)

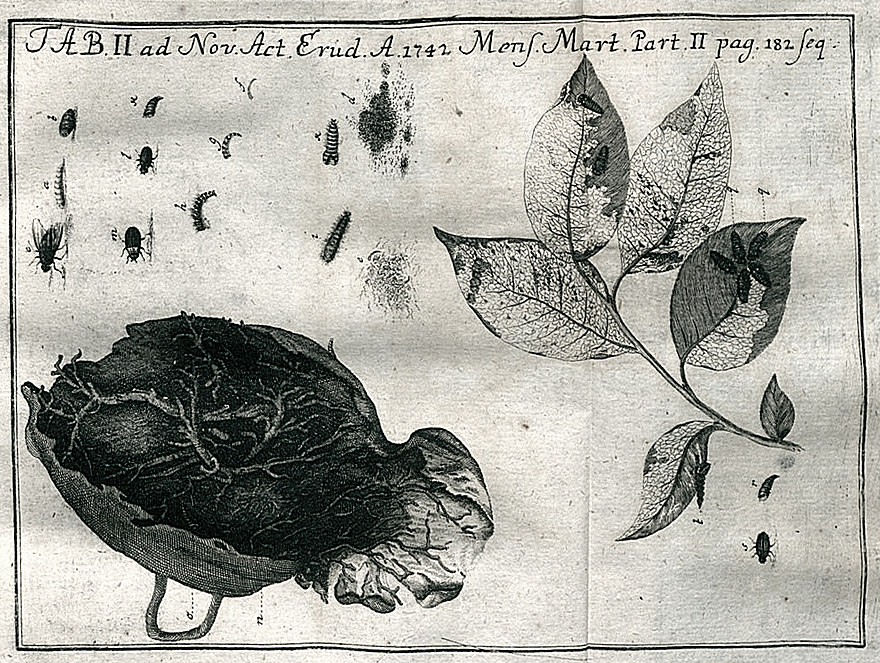
Illustration from critique of De vermibus, anatomicorum administris, commentatio. In Acta Eruditorum, 1742

Johann Ernst Hebenstreit (15 January 1703 – 5 December 1757) was a German physician and naturalist born in Neustadt an der Orla.

He was a student at the University of Leipzig, where in 1728 he earned his philosophy degree, and one year later obtained his medical doctorate with the dissertation "De viribus minerarum et Mineralium medicamentosis". In 1731, he became a member of the German Academy of Sciences Leopoldina.

In 1731, he was appointed by Augustus II to head an expedition to Africa to collect natural history specimens and to procure wild animals for the royal menagerie. After Augustus' death in 1733, the mission was discontinued, with Hebenstreit returning to Leipzig as a professor of medicine. In 1737, he became a professor of physiology, anatomy and surgery, and in 1748 was appointed dean of the medical faculty. During turmoil surrounding the May Uprising in Dresden (1849), specimens collected from the African expedition were lost.

Among Hebenstreits' numerous written works were an influential 1751 study of forensic medicine called "Anthropologia Forensis sistens medici circa rempublicam", and an illustrated catalogue involving the collection of minerals, fossils, and gems assembled by Leipzig banker Johann Christoph Richter (1689–1751) called "Museum Richterianum continens fossilia animalia, vegetabilia marina".

Carl Linnaeus named the plant genus Hebenstreitia in honor of Hebenstreit.

== Bibliography ==
- "Parts of this article are based on a translation of an equivalent article at the German Wikipedia".
- The Mineralogical Record- Library (biography)
