= Neustadt an der Orla =

- Town
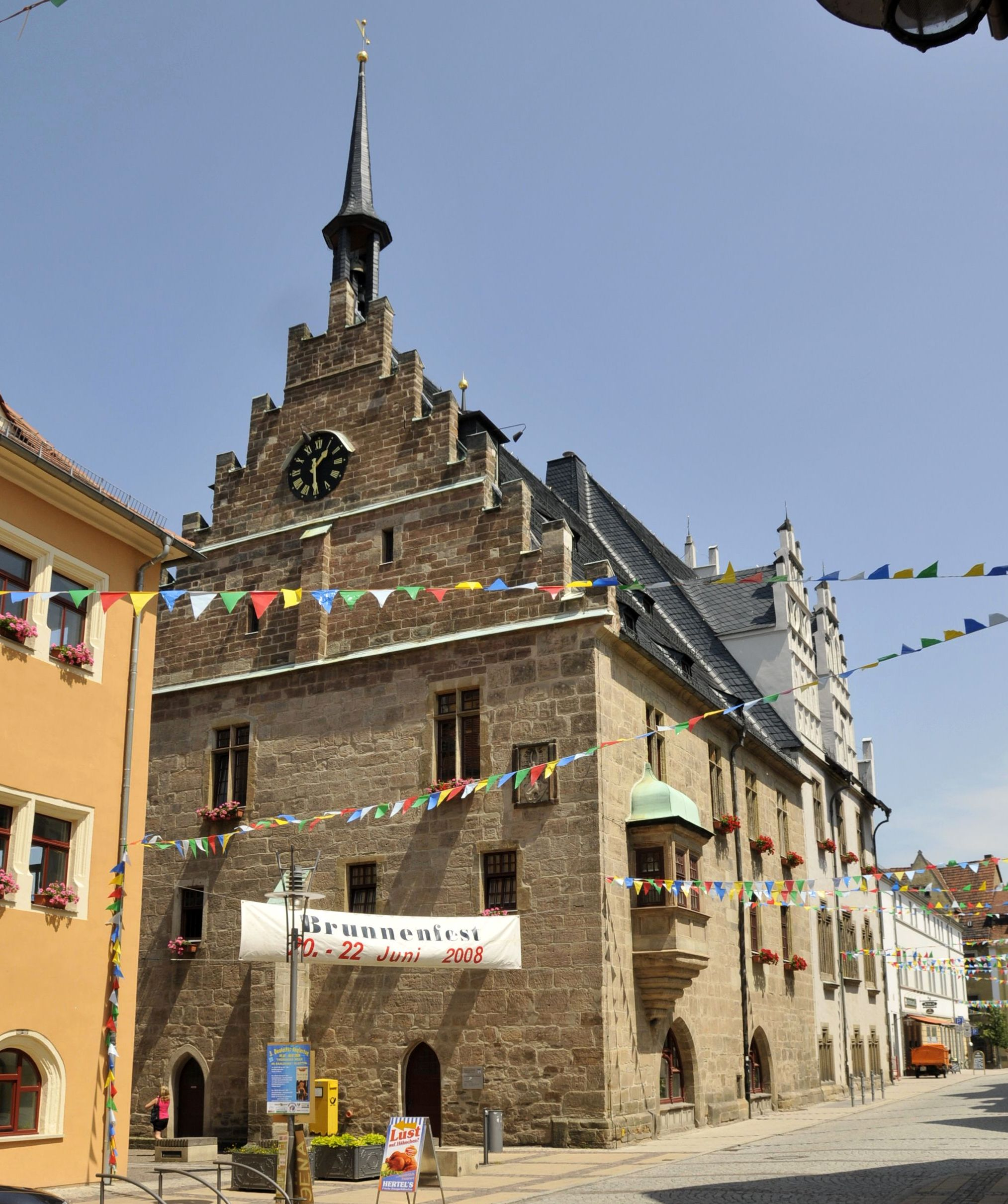
- Town hall

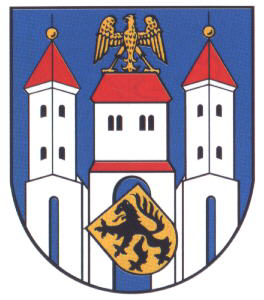
- Coat of arms

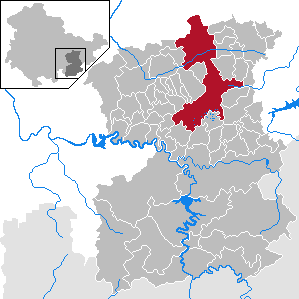
- Location of Neustadt an der Orla within Saale-Orla-Kreis district
- Interactive map of Neustadt an der Orla
- Location within Germany Location within Thuringia
- Coordinates: 50°44′N 11°45′E
- Country: Germany
- State: Thuringia
- District: Saale-Orla-Kreis

Government
  - Mayor (2024–30): Ralf Weiße

Area
  - Total: 86.08 km^{2} (33.24 sq mi)
- Elevation: 300 m (980 ft)

Population (2025-12-31)
  - Total: 8,743
  - Density: 101.6/km^{2} (263.1/sq mi)
- Time zone: UTC+01:00 (CET)
  - Summer (DST): UTC+02:00 (CEST)
- Postal codes: 07806
- Dialling codes: 036481
- Vehicle registration: SOK
- Website: www.neustadtanderorla.de

Neustadt an der Orla (German pronunciation: [ˈnɔʏʃtat ʔan deːɐ̯ ˈʔɔʁla], lit. 'Neustadt on the Orla') is a town in Saale-Orla-Kreis district, in Thuringia. It is situated at the small river Orla, 17 km north of Schleiz, and 25 km southeast of Jena. The former municipality Stanau was merged into Neustadt an der Orla in January 2019, and Linda bei Neustadt an der Orla, Knau and Dreba in December 2019.

== Geography ==
=== Setting ===
The additive, which differentiates Neustadt an der Orla from other towns named Neustadt, owed the town the Orla River. The Orla rises east of the town Triptis. Near Orlamünde the Orla flows into the river Saale. The district is called after these two rivers that are typical for this region.

=== Towns and villages in the neighbourhood ===
Pillingsdorf, Rosendorf, Dreitzsch, Schmieritz, Kospoda, Weira, Lausnitz, Langenorla, Trockenborn-Wolfersdorf and Breitenhain.

=== Parts of Neustadt an der Orla ===
- Neustadt (Orla) (12.52 km^{2})
- Arnshaugk (0.24 km^{2})
- Börthen (1.25 km^{2})
- Breitenhain-Strößwitz (5.57 km^{2})
- Dreba (12.47 km^{2})
- Knau (15.92 km^{2}, incl. Posen and Bucha)
- Lichtenau (2.25 km^{2})
- Linda bei Neustadt an der Orla (16.66 km^{2}, incl. Steinbrücken, Köthnitz and Kleina)
- Moderwitz (5.59 km^{2})
- Molbitz (4.56 km^{2})
- Neunhofen (4.54 km^{2})
- Stanau (4.28 km^{2})

Total area: 86.08 km^{2}

== History ==
Within the German Empire (1871–1918), Neustadt an der Orla was part of the Grand Duchy of Saxe-Weimar-Eisenach.

== Sons and daughters of the town ==
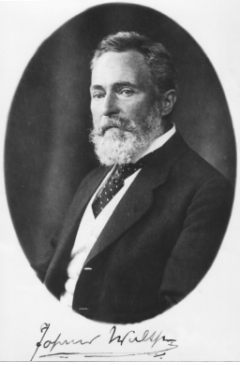
Johannes Walther

- Johann Ernst Hebenstreit (1702–1757), physician
- Friedrich Gumpert (1841–1906), hornist and music professor
- Johannes Walther (1860–1937), geologist
- Hans Fitz (1891–1972), stage author, actor and director
- Robert Döpel (1895–1982), nuclear physicist and professor
- Dietmar Schauerhammer (born 1955), bob driver

== Other personalities ==
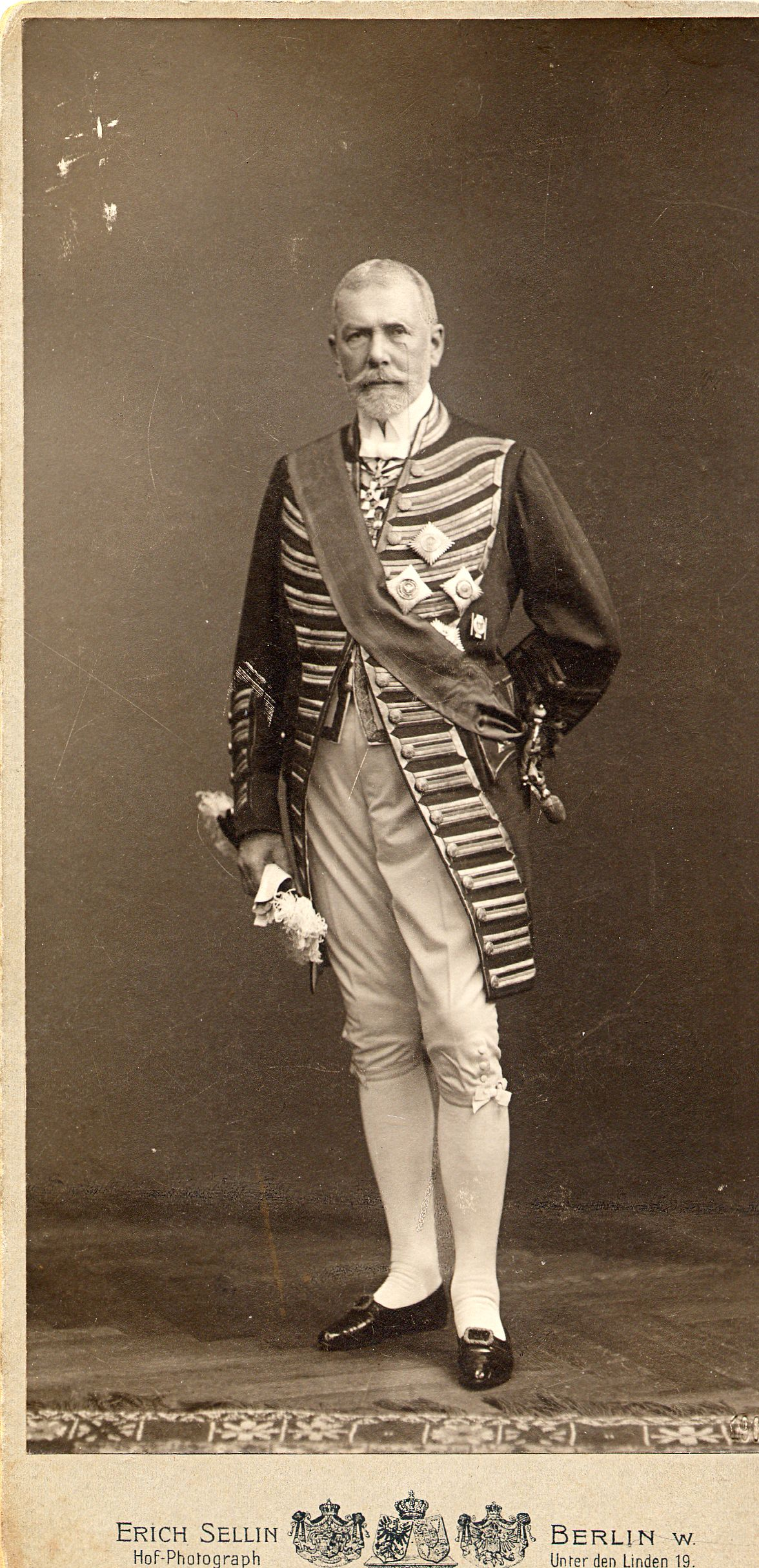
Ottmar von Mohl around 1910

- Ottmar von Mohl (1846–1922), diplomat, died at the castle Arnshaugk near Neustadt
- Hanka Kupfernagel (born 1974), cyclist
- Nico Herzig (born 1983), footballer, lived the first years in the district Molbitz
- Denny Herzig (born 1984), footballer, lived the first years in the district Molbitz
