= Orla (Saale) =

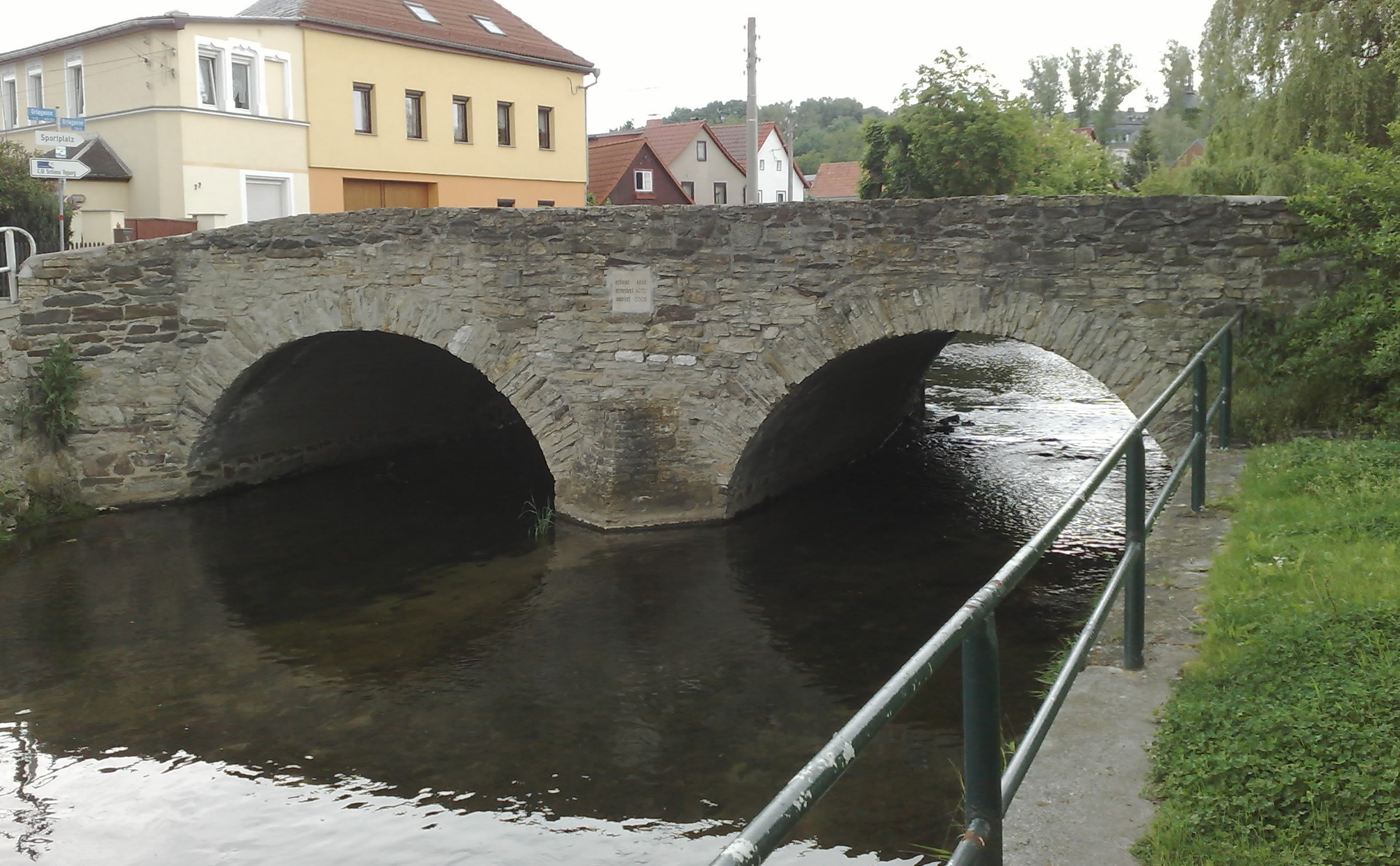

Location
- Country: Germany
- State: Thuringia

Physical characteristics
- Mouth
  - location: Saale
  - coordinates: 50.7732°N 11.5462°E

Basin features
- Progression: Saale→ Elbe→ North Sea

The Orla (German pronunciation: [ˈɔʁla]) is a 35 km (22 mi) long river in eastern Thuringia, Germany. With its source near the town of Triptis, it is a right tributary to the river Saale. The Orla flows west through the towns Neustadt an der Orla and Pößneck, into the Saale in Orlamünde, 17 km (11 mi) south of Jena.

== See also ==
- List of rivers of Thuringia
