= Linda bei Neustadt an der Orla =

- Ortsteil of Neustadt an der Orla
- Interactive map of Linda bei Neustadt an der Orla
- Location within Germany Location within Thuringia
- Coordinates: 50°41′11″N 11°46′55″E
- Country: Germany
- State: Thuringia
- District: Saale-Orla-Kreis
- Town: Neustadt an der Orla

Area
  - Total: 16.66 km^{2} (6.43 sq mi)
- Elevation: 500 m (1,600 ft)

Population (2018-12-31)
  - Total: 381
  - Density: 22.9/km^{2} (59.2/sq mi)
- Time zone: UTC+01:00 (CET)
  - Summer (DST): UTC+02:00 (CEST)
- Postal codes: 07819
- Dialling codes: 036481
- Vehicle registration: SOK
- Website: www.neustadtanderorla.de

Linda bei Neustadt an der Orla (German pronunciation: [ˈlɪnda baɪ ˈnɔʏʃtat ʔan deːɐ̯ ˈʔɔʁla], lit. 'Linda near Neustadt an der Orla') is a village and a former municipality in the district Saale-Orla-Kreis, in Thuringia, Germany. Since December 2019, it is part of the town Neustadt an der Orla.
