= Knau =

- Ortsteil of Neustadt an der Orla
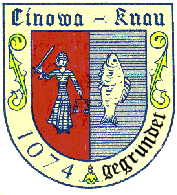
- Coat of arms
- Interactive map of Knau
- Location within Germany Location within Thuringia
- Coordinates: 50°39′N 11°44′E
- Country: Germany
- State: Thuringia
- District: Saale-Orla-Kreis
- Town: Neustadt an der Orla

Area
  - Total: 12.76 km^{2} (4.93 sq mi)
- Elevation: 450 m (1,480 ft)

Population (2018-12-31)
  - Total: 718
  - Density: 56.3/km^{2} (146/sq mi)
- Time zone: UTC+01:00 (CET)
  - Summer (DST): UTC+02:00 (CEST)
- Postal codes: 07389
- Dialling codes: 036484
- Website: www.knau.de

Knau (German pronunciation: [knaʊ]) is a village and a former municipality in the district Saale-Orla-Kreis, in Thuringia, Germany. The former municipality Bucha was merged into Knau in January 2019. Since December 2019, it is part of the town Neustadt an der Orla.
