= Bucha, Saale-Orla =

Bucha
- Ortsteil of Neustadt an der Orla
- Interactive map of Bucha
- Location within Germany Location within Thuringia
- Coordinates: 50°38′N 11°42′E
- Country: Germany
- State: Thuringia
- District: Saale-Orla-Kreis
- Town: Neustadt an der Orla

Area
  - Total: 3.17 km^{2} (1.22 sq mi)
- Elevation: 460 m (1,510 ft)

Population (2017-12-31)
  - Total: 93
  - Density: 29/km^{2} (76/sq mi)
- Time zone: UTC+01:00 (CET)
  - Summer (DST): UTC+02:00 (CEST)
- Postal codes: 07389
- Dialling codes: 036484
- Vehicle registration: SOK

Bucha (German pronunciation: [ˈbuːxa]) is a village and a former municipality in the district Saale-Orla-Kreis, in Thuringia, Germany. Since 1 January 2019, it is part of the municipality Knau, and since December 2019 of the town Neustadt an der Orla.
