= Mead Wildlife Area =

State Wildlife Area in Wisconsin, US

- IUCN category V (protected landscape/seascape)
- Location within Wisconsin Location within the United States
- Location: Marathon, Portage, and Wood counties
- Nearest city: Mosinee, Wisconsin
- Coordinates: 44.69722°N 89.86342°W
- Established: 1959
- Named for: George W. Mead
- Governing body: Wisconsin Department of Natural Resources
- Website: www.meadwildlife.org

The Mead (George W.) Wildlife Area (the Mead) is a state wildlife area covering over 33,000 acres (130 km^{2}) in central Wisconsin. It includes portions of Marathon, Portage, and Wood counties. It is managed by the Wisconsin Department of Natural Resources (WDNR). The Area is commonly referred to as "the Mead". Five WDNR staff manage the area. The non-profit organization Friends of the Mead/McMillan Association, Inc. assist with raising funds to support the area's activities.

The Mead has over 70 miles of maintained hiking trails including a 7-mile hiking loop around the Berkahn Flowage. It is home to 291 species of birds annually. As of 2018, a total of 278 bird species have been recorded for the Mead SWA. Currently, there are 126 bird species known to breed in this area.

== History ==
Originally in the early 1900s, the lowlands in the area were to be used for farming. They were drained by digging ditches and dredging and straightening a five-mile (8 km) section of the Little Eau Pleine River. Farming failed, however, as the lowlands were too cold and acidic for farming.

In 1933, the area was to be the site of two reservoirs impounding the Big and Little Eau Pleine Rivers. Land was purchased by the Consolidated Water Power and Paper Company (now NewPage Corporation). The Big Eau Pleine River dam was built in 1936. The dam on the Little Eau Pleine River, which would have created the second largest lake in Wisconsin with 27,500 acres (111 km^{2}), was not built due to opposition from conservationists and local residents. On April 10, 1959, Stanton W. Mead, President of Consolidated Paper Company, donated 20,000 acres (81 km^{2}) to the State of Wisconsin for use as a state wildlife area. The area is named for Stanton's father, George W. Mead. The visitor center bears Stanton's name. Then governor Gaylord Nelson attended the dedication. Additional land has been purchased or donated since the area's inception.

In addition to the Mead's area, the McMillan Marsh Wildlife Area is also managed by the same WDNR employees. It encompasses 7,500 acres (30 km^{2}) and is located one mile (1.6 km) north of the Marshfield city limits. It is named after the town of McMillan in which it is located. On documentation, the two areas are collectively referred to as "Mead/McMillan".

== Purpose ==
The area encompasses different ecosystems including grasslands, conifer bogs, hardwood forests, wetlands, ponds (reservoirs), uplands, and agricultural fields. The area consists of forest, wetlands, and grasslands comprising 13,000 acres (53 km^{2}), 14,000 acres (57 km^{2}), and 6,000 acres (24 km^{2}) respectively. There are three objectives of the Mead Wildlife Area: resource management, recreation management, and environmental education.

Resource management includes management of the various ecosystems. Grasslands are maintained by prescribed burns and forests are maintained by sustainable forest management practices. Reservoirs are surrounded by dikes or higher ground. Pumping stations and water control structures manage the flow of water from the Little Eau Pleine River and individual reservoirs. Various universities and state and federal government wildlife agencies conduct research on the property.

Recreation management includes managing the area for hunting, fishing, trapping, hiking, birding, and biking. Public access to all areas is open year-round, except for designated wildlife refuges. Most dikes and logging trails are foot accessible and one dike has a marked bike trail. An area has been designated for hunting dog training. All exterior boundaries are marked with signs.

Environmental education is provided to students from various schools located in the surrounding areas. Target audiences include elementary aged school children and environmental education teachers.

== Visitor center ==
The 6,208-square-foot (576.7 m^{2}) Stanton W. Mead Education and Visitor Center was constructed in 2005, and includes sustainable design methods and renewable energy technologies such as environmentally-responsible construction methods, environmentally-responsible materials, high-performance building envelope, passive solar and cool day lighting, active solar heating for domestic hot water, geothermal heating and cooling, wind-turbine generated electricity, solar photovoltaic generated electricity, biomass wood heat, and high-performance mechanical systems. The architect Thomas Brown designed building won the Wisconsin Green Building Alliance 2006 Sustainability and Energy Efficiency (SE^{2}) Leadership Award of Excellence.

The center was built largely through private funds and in-kind donations of materials and services, totaling $1.6 million. The State of Wisconsin contributed $606,000 to the project.

The center, along with other buildings, houses the WDNR staff, resource management equipment and is used for environmental education.
