= Ben Lang =

American politician

Lang, circa 1929

Ben Lang (November 11, 1870 – April 19, 1960) was an American farmer, businessman, and politician.

Born in the unincorporated community of Saint Lawrence, Washington County, Wisconsin, Lang moved with his family to the Town of McMillan, Marathon County, Wisconsin, where he lived for the rest of his life. Lang was a farmer and was also involved with the insurance business and with the consumer store and produce cooperative. Lang was a Republican. Lang served on the Marathon County Board of Education and the Marathon County Board of Supervisors. He was also chairman of the Town of McMillan. In 1931, Lang served in the Wisconsin State Assembly.
