= Saint Lawrence (community), Wisconsin =

Saint Lawrence, Wisconsin
- Unincorporated community
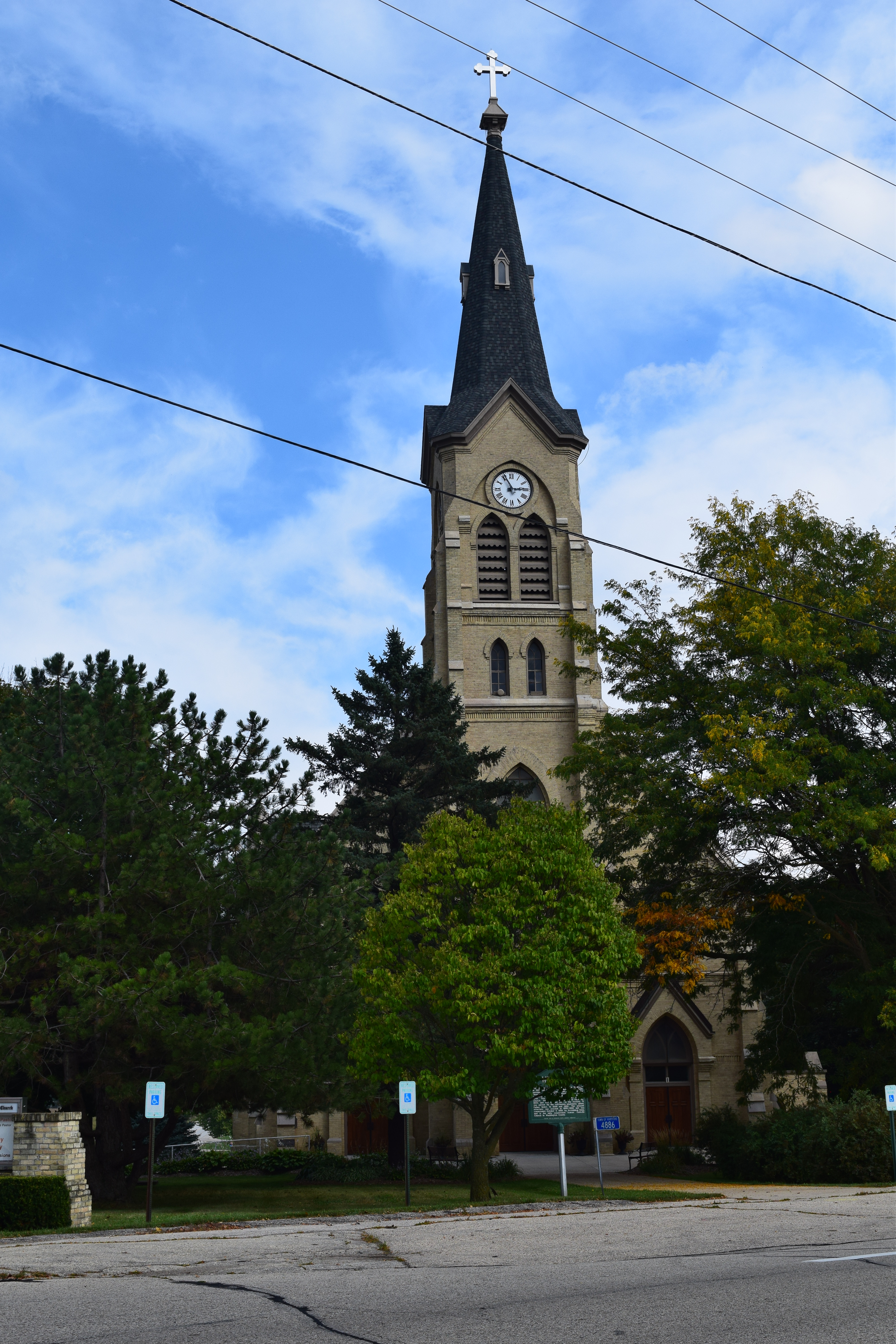
- St. Lawrence Catholic Church

- Location within Wisconsin Location within the United States
- Coordinates: 43°22′11″N 88°19′58″W
- Country: United States
- State: Wisconsin
- County: Washington
- Elevation: 1,096 ft (334 m)
- Time zone: UTC-6 (Central (CST))
  - Summer (DST): UTC-5 (CDT)
- Area code: 262
- GNIS feature ID: 1573207

Saint Lawrence is an unincorporated community located in the towns of Addison and Hartford, Washington County, Wisconsin, United States.

== Notable people ==
- Ben Lang, farmer, businessman, and politician, was born in Saint Lawrence.
