= Francis X. Schilling =

20th century American politician

Francis X. Schilling (April 26, 1868 – March 29, 1949) was an American farmer and Republican politician from Marathon County, Wisconsin. He represented Marathon County in the Wisconsin State Assembly during the 1913 session. In historical documents his name was frequently abbreviated as F. X. Schilling.

== Biography ==
Born in the town of Cassel, Wisconsin, in Marathon County, Wisconsin, Schilling owned a farm in Cassel, Wisconsin, and was involved with the telephone and creamery businesses. He was chairman of the Cassel Town Board, town clerk and treasurer. He served on the Marathon County Board of Supervisors and was chairman. He served in the Wisconsin State Assembly in 1913 and 1914 and was a Republican. He died as a result of being hit by a motorist near his daughter's house.
