= Bergen, Marathon County, Wisconsin =

Bergen, Wisconsin
- Town
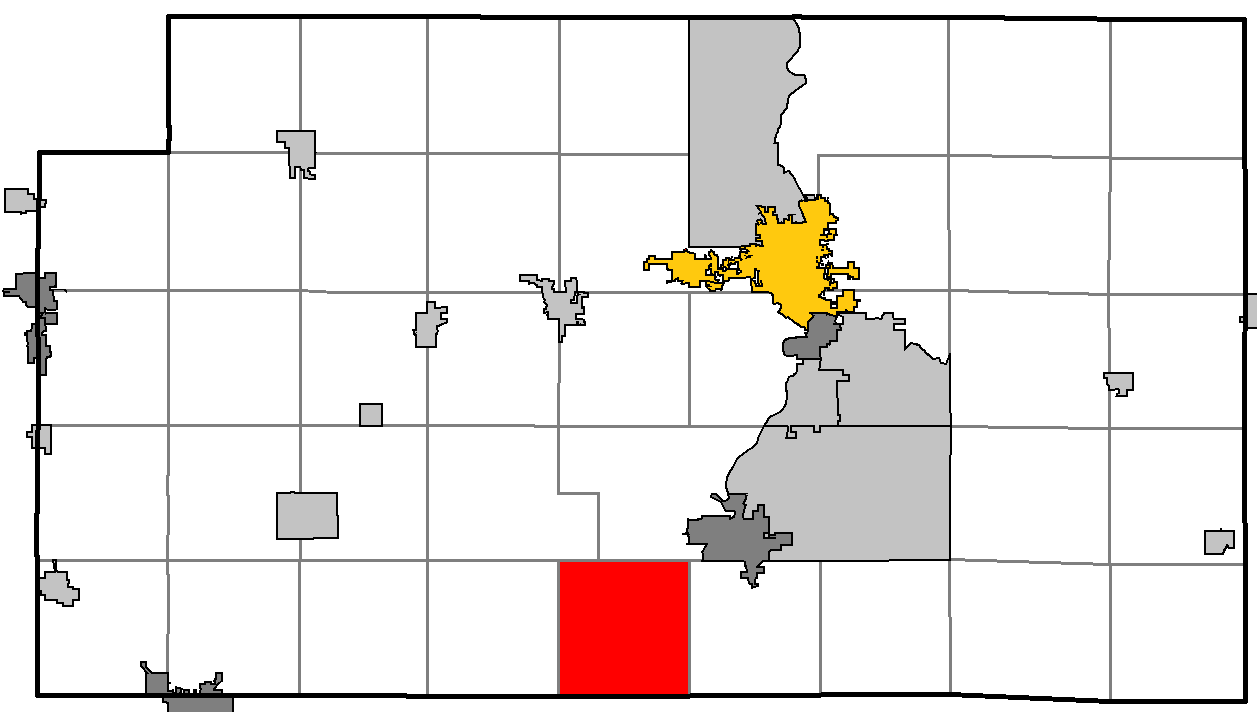
- Location of Bergen, Marathon County

- Location of Marathon County, Wisconsin
- Coordinates: 44°42′59″N 89°45′40″W
- Country: United States
- State: Wisconsin
- County: Marathon

Area
  - Total: 34.8 sq mi (90.1 km^{2})
  - Land: 27.0 sq mi (70.0 km^{2})
  - Water: 7.8 sq mi (20.1 km^{2})
- Elevation: 1,150 ft (350 m)

Population (2020)
  - Total: 740
  - Density: 27/sq mi (11/km^{2})
- Time zone: UTC-6 (Central (CST))
  - Summer (DST): UTC-5 (CDT)
- Area codes: 715 & 534
- FIPS code: 55-06875
- GNIS feature ID: 1582797
- Website: https://townofbergenwi.gov/

Bergen is a town in Marathon County, Wisconsin, United States. It is part of the Wausau, Wisconsin Metropolitan Statistical Area. The population was 740 at the 2020 census. The unincorporated community of Moon is located partially in the town.

== Geography ==
According to the United States Census Bureau, the town has a total area of 34.8 square miles (90.1 km^{2}), of which 27.0 square miles (70.0 km^{2}) is land and 7.8 square miles (20.1 km^{2}), or 22.31%, is water.

== Demographics ==
Historical population
Census	Pop.	Note	%±
2000	615		—
2010	641		4.2%
2020	740		15.4%
U.S. Decennial Census

At the 2000 census there were 615 people, 228 households, and 192 families living in the town. The population density was 22.8 people per square mile (8.8/km^{2}). There were 244 housing units at an average density of 9.0 per square mile (3.5/km^{2}). The racial makeup of the town was 99.19% White, 0.16% Native American, and 0.65% from two or more races. Hispanic or Latino of any race were 0.16%.

Of the 228 households 33.8% had children under the age of 18 living with them, 78.1% were married couples living together, 2.2% had a female householder with no husband present, and 15.4% were non-families. 14.5% of households were one person and 4.4% were one person aged 65 or older. The average household size was 2.70 and the average family size was 2.95.

The age distribution was 23.1% under the age of 18, 6.2% from 18 to 24, 29.8% from 25 to 44, 28.3% from 45 to 64, and 12.7% 65 or older. The median age was 39 years. For every 100 females, there were 115.0 males. For every 100 females age 18 and over, there were 109.3 males.

The median household income was $53,214 and the median family income was $57,321. Males had a median income of $37,917 versus $30,000 for females. The per capita income for the town was $24,766. About 2.5% of families and 2.5% of the population were below the poverty line, including 2.3% of those under age 18 and 4.3% of those age 65 or over.
