= Leo Gesicki =

American politician (1891–1961)

Leo J. Gesicki (April 1, 1891 – February 1, 1961) was an American politician and businessman.

Gesicki was born in the town of Cassel, Marathon County, Wisconsin. He went to the public schools in Marathon County and to college in Prairie du Chien, Wisconsin. Gesicki worked in a hardware store in Spokane, Washington and then in then worked in a general store in Marathon County. He served in the United States Coast Guard during World War II and worked as a Wisconsin deputy oil inspector. Gesicki owned an insurance business in Merrill, Wisconsin. Gesicki served in the Wisconsin Assembly from Merrill, Wisconsin in 1931 and 1932 and was a Republican. He was also a member of the Democratic and Wisconsin Progressive Parties. Gesicki died in Merrill, Wisconsin.
