= Stanau =

- Ortsteil of Neustadt an der Orla
- Interactive map of Stanau
- Location within Germany Location within Thuringia
- Coordinates: 50°47′3″N 11°44′5″E
- Country: Germany
- State: Thuringia
- District: Saale-Orla-Kreis
- Town: Neustadt an der Orla

Area
  - Total: 4.28 km^{2} (1.65 sq mi)
- Elevation: 300 m (980 ft)

Population (2017-12-31)
  - Total: 117
  - Density: 27.3/km^{2} (70.8/sq mi)
- Time zone: UTC+01:00 (CET)
  - Summer (DST): UTC+02:00 (CEST)
- Postal codes: 07806
- Dialling codes: 036481
- Vehicle registration: SOK

Stanau (German pronunciation: [ˈʃtaːnaʊ]) is a village and a former municipality in the district Saale-Orla-Kreis, in Thuringia, Germany. Since 1 January 2019, it is part of the town Neustadt an der Orla.
