= Breitenhain =

- Ortsteil of Neustadt an der Orla
- Interactive map of Breitenhain
- Location within Germany Location within Thuringia
- Coordinates: 50°46′N 11°43′E
- Country: Germany
- State: Thuringia
- District: Saale-Orla-Kreis
- Town: Neustadt an der Orla

Area
  - Total: 5.57 km^{2} (2.15 sq mi)
- Elevation: 320 m (1,050 ft)

Population (2009-12-31)
  - Total: 151
  - Density: 27.1/km^{2} (70.2/sq mi)
- Time zone: UTC+01:00 (CET)
  - Summer (DST): UTC+02:00 (CEST)
- Postal codes: 07806
- Dialling codes: 036481
- Website: www.neustadtanderorla.de

Breitenhain (German pronunciation: [ˈbʁaɪtn̩haɪn]) is a village and a former municipality in the district Saale-Orla-Kreis, in Thuringia, Germany. Since 1 December 2010, it has been part of the town Neustadt an der Orla.
