= Cassel, Wisconsin =

Town of Cassel, Wisconsin
- Town
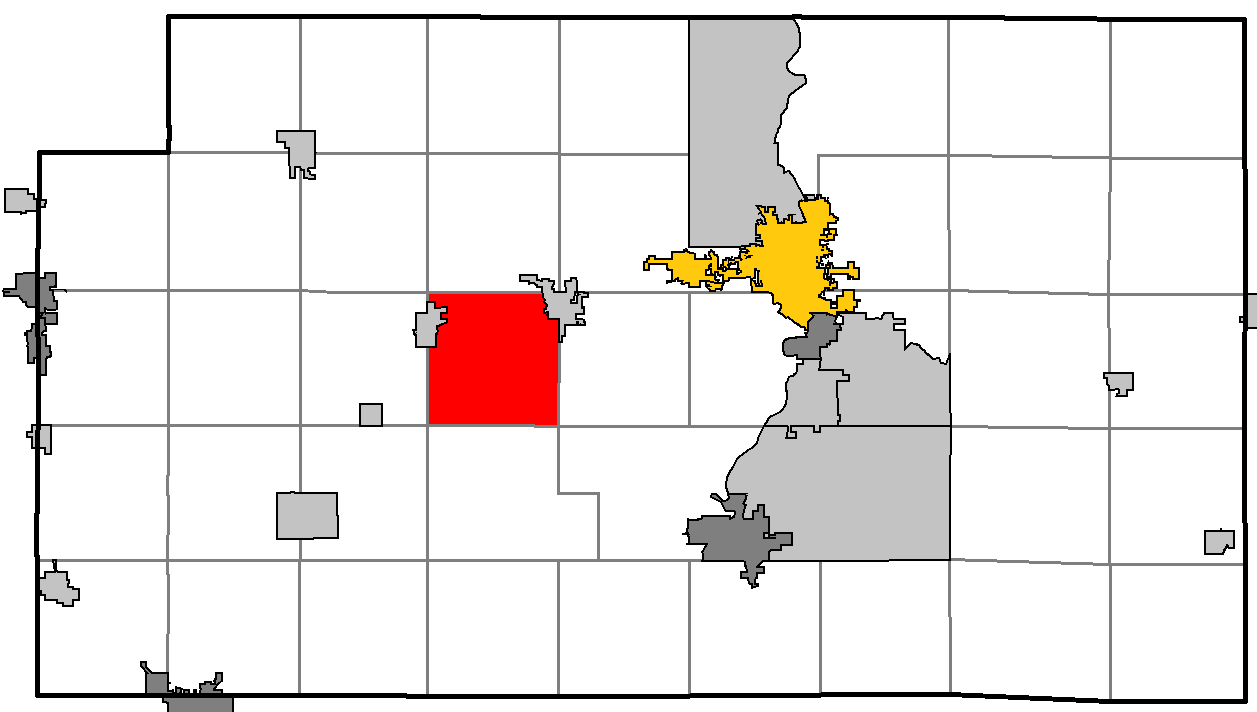
- Location of the Town of Cassel, Marathon County

- Location of Marathon County, Wisconsin
- Coordinates: 44°54′18″N 89°54′37″W
- Country: United States
- State: Wisconsin
- County: Marathon

Area
  - Total: 33.1 sq mi (85.6 km^{2})
  - Land: 33.0 sq mi (85.5 km^{2})
  - Water: 0 sq mi (0.0 km^{2})
- Elevation: 1,270 ft (387 m)

Population (2020)
  - Total: 934
  - Density: 28.3/sq mi (10.9/km^{2})
- Time zone: UTC-6 (Central (CST))
  - Summer (DST): UTC-5 (CDT)
- Area codes: 715 & 534
- FIPS code: 55-12975
- GNIS feature ID: 1582925
- Website: https://www.townofcasselwi.gov/

Cassel is a town in Marathon County, Wisconsin, United States. It is part of the Wausau, Wisconsin Metropolitan Statistical Area. The population was 934 at the 2020 census.

== Geography ==
According to the United States Census Bureau, the town has a total area of 33.0 square miles (85.5 km^{2}), of which 33.0 square miles (85.5 km^{2}) is land and 0.03% is water.

== Demographics ==
At the 2000 census there were 847 people, 271 households, and 223 families living in the town. The population density was 25.6 people per square mile (9.9/km^{2}). There were 286 housing units at an average density of 8.7 per square mile (3.3/km^{2}). The racial makeup of the town was 97.40% White, 0.12% African American, 1.77% Asian, and 0.71% from two or more races. Hispanic or Latino of any race were 0.47%.

Of the 271 households 43.2% had children under the age of 18 living with them, 75.6% were married couples living together, 3.3% had a female householder with no husband present, and 17.7% were non-families. 15.1% of households were one person and 6.3% were one person aged 65 or older. The average household size was 3.10 and the average family size was 3.49.

The age distribution was 31.2% under the age of 18, 7.8% from 18 to 24, 28.6% from 25 to 44, 20.4% from 45 to 64, and 12.0% 65 or older. The median age was 35 years. For every 100 females, there were 110.2 males. For every 100 females age 18 and over, there were 107.5 males.

The median household income was $52,614 and the median family income was $55,938. Males had a median income of $35,268 versus $22,434 for females. The per capita income for the town was $22,818. About 7.8% of families and 9.4% of the population were below the poverty line, including 10.6% of those under age 18 and 13.8% of those age 65 or over.

== Notable people ==
- Leo Gesicki, businessman and politician, was born in the town
- Francis X. Schilling, farmer and politician, was born in the town
