= Halsey, Wisconsin =

- Town
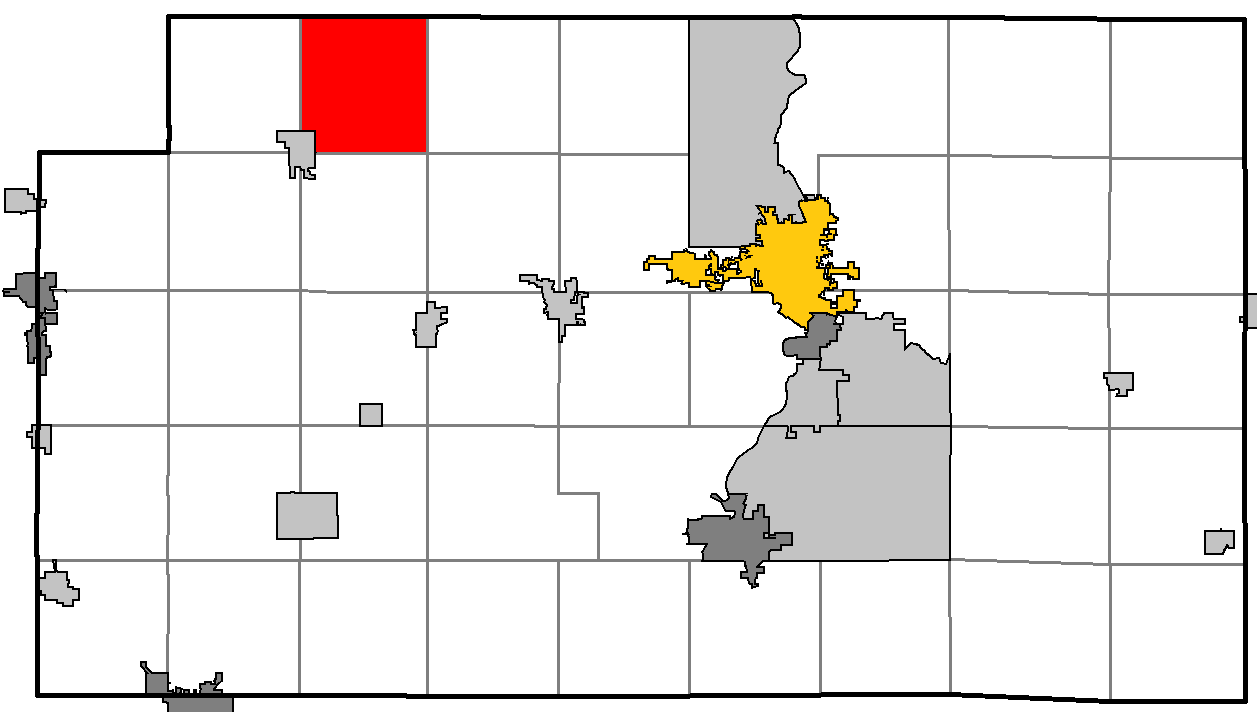
- Location of Halsey, Marathon County

- Location of Marathon County, Wisconsin
- Coordinates: 45°4′52″N 90°1′30″W
- Country: United States
- State: Wisconsin
- County: Marathon

Area
  - Total: 33.1 sq mi (85.8 km^{2})
  - Land: 33.1 sq mi (85.8 km^{2})
  - Water: 0 sq mi (0.0 km^{2})
- Elevation: 1,371 ft (418 m)

Population (2020)
  - Total: 634
  - Density: 19.1/sq mi (7.39/km^{2})
- Time zone: UTC-6 (Central (CST))
  - Summer (DST): UTC-5 (CDT)
- Area codes: 715 & 534
- FIPS code: 55-32150
- GNIS feature ID: 1583337

Halsey is a town in Marathon County, Wisconsin, United States. It is part of the Wausau, Wisconsin Metropolitan Statistical Area. The population was 634 at the 2020 census. The town is named for Pierson Halsey, a partner in the Milwaukee law firm of Rietbrock, Halsey and Johnson, which founded Athens, Wisconsin. It was set off from the town of Hamburg in 1883.

== Geography ==
According to the United States Census Bureau, the town has a total area of 33.1 square miles (85.8 km^{2}), all land.

== Demographics ==
At the 2000 census there were 645 people, 192 households, and 168 families living in the town. The population density was 19.5 people per square mile (7.5/km^{2}). There were 208 housing units at an average density of 6.3 per square mile (2.4/km^{2}). The racial makeup of the town was 98.29% White, 0.16% African American, 0.16% Asian, 1.40% from other races. Hispanic or Latino of any race were 2.95%.

Of the 192 households 49.0% had children under the age of 18 living with them, 76.0% were married couples living together, 5.2% had a female householder with no husband present, and 12.5% were non-families. 10.9% of households were one person and 3.6% were one person aged 65 or older. The average household size was 3.36 and the average family size was 3.61.

The age distribution was 33.8% under the age of 18, 7.1% from 18 to 24, 31.0% from 25 to 44, 19.7% from 45 to 64, and 8.4% 65 or older. The median age was 31 years. For every 100 females, there were 105.4 males. For every 100 females age 18 and over, there were 104.3 males.

The median household income was $44,625 and the median family income was $46,500. Males had a median income of $31,161 versus $20,938 for females. The per capita income for the town was $15,317. About 3.9% of families and 4.2% of the population were below the poverty line, including 4.7% of those under age 18 and 5.7% of those age 65 or over.
