= Holton, Wisconsin =

- Town
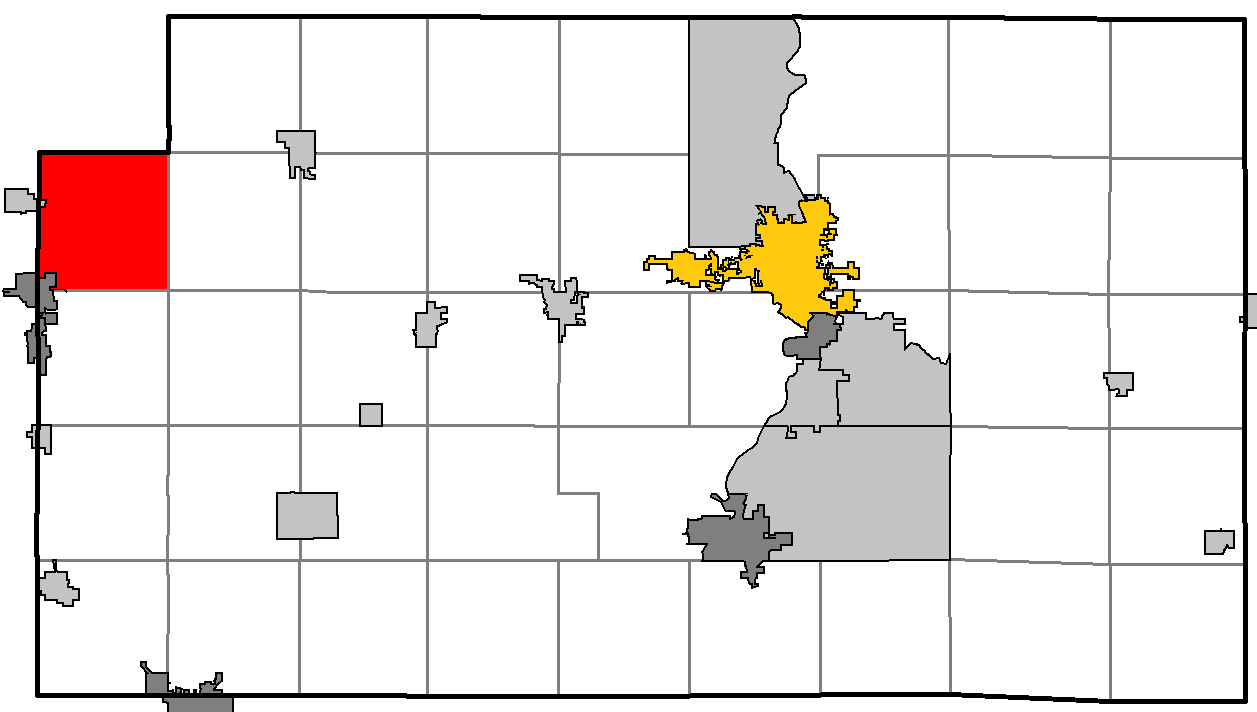
- Location of Holton, Marathon County

- Location of Marathon County, Wisconsin
- Coordinates: 44°59′8″N 90°15′49″W
- Country: United States
- State: Wisconsin
- County: Marathon

Area
  - Total: 34.6 sq mi (89.5 km^{2})
  - Land: 34.6 sq mi (89.5 km^{2})
  - Water: 0 sq mi (0.0 km^{2})
- Elevation: 1,404 ft (428 m)

Population (2020)
  - Total: 859
  - Density: 24.9/sq mi (9.60/km^{2})
- Time zone: UTC-6 (Central (CST))
  - Summer (DST): UTC-5 (CDT)
- Area codes: 715 & 534
- FIPS code: 55-35500
- GNIS feature ID: 1583405
- Website: https://townofholton.wi.gov/

Holton is a town in Marathon County, Wisconsin, United States. It is part of the Wausau, Wisconsin Metropolitan Statistical Area. The population was 859 at the 2020 census.

== Geography ==
According to the United States Census Bureau, the town has a total area of 34.6 square miles (89.5 km^{2}), of which 0.008 square miles (0.02 km^{2}), or 0.02%, is water.

== Demographics ==
At the 2000 census there were 907 people, 297 households, and 239 families living in the town. The population density was 26.5 people per square mile (10.2/km^{2}). There were 312 housing units at an average density of 9.1 per square mile (3.5/km^{2}). The racial makeup of the town was 99.23% White, 0.11% African American, and 0.66% from two or more races. Hispanic or Latino of any race were 0.77%.

Of the 297 households 41.8% had children under the age of 18 living with them, 72.7% were married couples living together, 4.4% had a female householder with no husband present, and 19.2% were non-families. 16.2% of households were one person and 5.1% were one person aged 65 or older. The average household size was 3.05 and the average family size was 3.45.

The age distribution was 32.3% under the age of 18, 8.4% from 18 to 24, 27.9% from 25 to 44, 21.1% from 45 to 64, and 10.4% 65 or older. The median age was 34 years. For every 100 females, there were 112.9 males. For every 100 females age 18 and over, there were 111.0 males.

The median household income was $36,000 and the median family income was $39,750. Males had a median income of $24,500 versus $20,156 for females. The per capita income for the town was $13,884. About 11.1% of families and 14.9% of the population were below the poverty line, including 23.1% of those under age 18 and 12.8% of those age 65 or over.

== Notable people ==
- Herman Hedrich, farmer and politician, lived on a farm in the town and served in the Wisconsin State Assembly during that time
