= McMillan (community), Wisconsin =

McMillan, Wisconsin
- Unincorporated community
- Location within Wisconsin Location within the United States
- Coordinates: 44°44′32″N 90°09′48″W
- Country: United States
- State: Wisconsin
- County: Marathon
- Elevation: 1,270 ft (390 m)
- Time zone: UTC-6 (Central (CST))
  - Summer (DST): UTC-5 (CDT)
- Area codes: 715 and 534
- GNIS feature ID: 1844192

McMillan is an unincorporated community in the town of McMillan, Marathon County, Wisconsin, United States, which was at one time an incorporated village.

== History ==
A post office called McMillan was established in 1881, and remained in operation until it was discontinued in 1919. The community was named for B. F. McMillan, a businessperson in the lumber industry.
