= McMillan, Wisconsin =

- Town
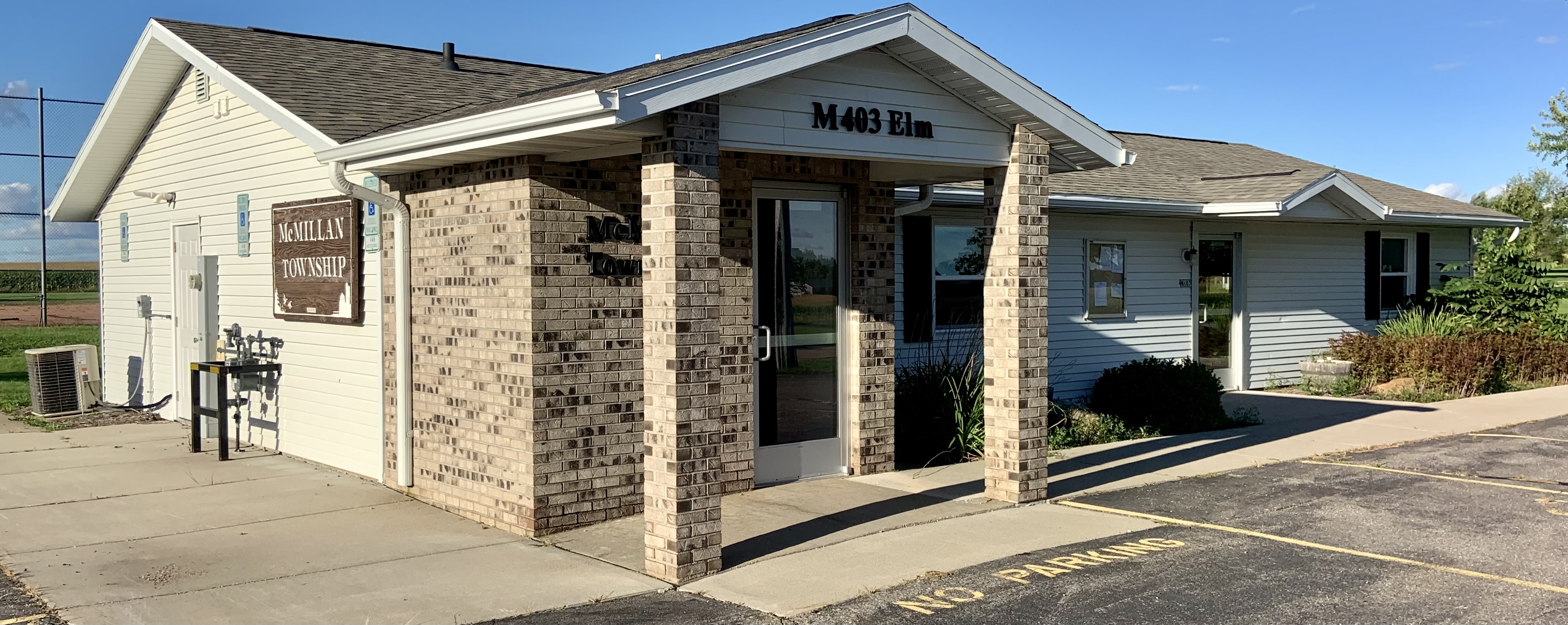
- Town hall

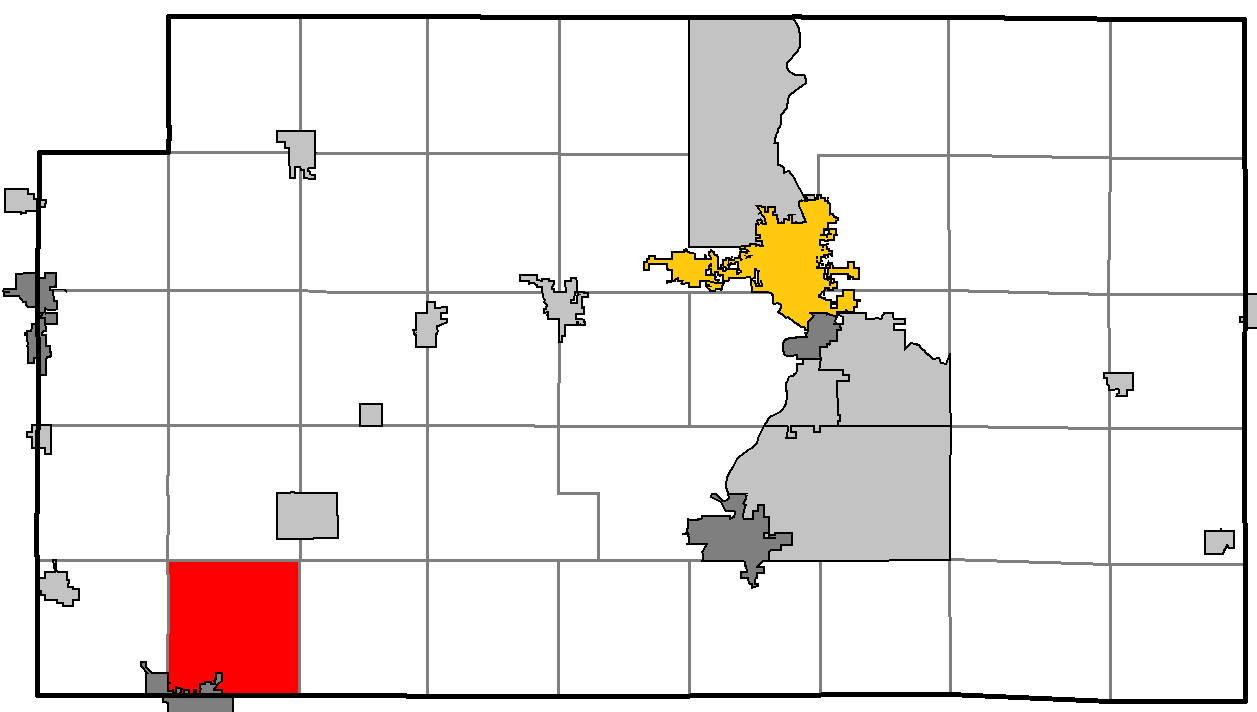
- Location of McMillan, Marathon County, Wisconsin

- Location of Marathon County, Wisconsin
- Coordinates: 44°43′34″N 90°7′47″W
- Country: United States
- State: Wisconsin
- County: Marathon

Area
  - Total: 34.4 sq mi (89.0 km^{2})
  - Land: 34.1 sq mi (88.4 km^{2})
  - Water: 0.19 sq mi (0.5 km^{2})
- Elevation: 1,260 ft (384 m)

Population (2020)
  - Total: 2,074
  - Density: 60.8/sq mi (23.5/km^{2})
- Time zone: UTC-6 (Central (CST))
  - Summer (DST): UTC-5 (CDT)
- Area codes: 715 & 534
- FIPS code: 55-46975
- GNIS feature ID: 1583623
- PLSS township: T26N R3E
- Website: www.townofmcmillan.gov

McMillan is a town in Marathon County, Wisconsin, United States. It is part of the Wausau, Wisconsin Metropolitan Statistical Area. The population was 2,074 at the 2020 census. The unincorporated community of McMillan is located in the town. A section of the Mead Wildlife Area is also located in the town.

== Geography ==
According to the United States Census Bureau, the town has a total area of 34.4 square miles (89.0 km^{2}), of which 34.1 square miles (88.4 km^{2}) is land and 0.19 square miles (0.5 km^{2}), or 0.59%, is water.

== History ==
The outline of the six-mile square that would become McMillan was first surveyed in August/September 1851 by a crew working for the U.S. government. In November 1853 another crew marked its section corners, walking through the woods and wading the streams, measuring with chain and compass. When done, the deputy surveyor filed this general description:

This Township contains several small swamps, and some of considerable size. The(sic) is a great part of the land which is of poor quality, particularly so, that part of it which contains Hemlock & Fir. The Soil(?) a poor quality, being clay [undecipherable] and rough & uneven. There is a great part of it that the rocks lay(?) on the surface. The land which contains Hardwood(?) is of good quality & would make good farming land(?).

The Pine in this Township is of Poor quality & scattering. This Township is well watter(sic), most of the streams [undecipherable]. There is one stream which runs through the Township is of sufficient size for Milling purposes being [indecipherable] high banks & rocky bottoms. There is no improvement in this Township.

In 1874 B.F. and Charles McMillan built a sawmill on the Little Eau Pleine River, five miles north of the young town of Marshfield. The mill prospered and workers settled nearby. A school was started in 1881. A village of McMillan was incorporated with its own post office and the population grew to at least 200. But the nearby timber was eventually exhausted and in 1911 the sawmill closed. Most of the village gradually faded away, now leaving only the neighborhood known as "Sugarbush."

As timber was cut, settlers bought the stump-clogged forties and began to carve out farms. These eventually focused on dairy, shipping their milk to local cheese factories.

In the early 1900s a community called Riverside coalesced where T crosses 97 and the Little Eau Pleine. It had a saloon, a grocery store, a feed mill, a blacksmith, and a school. It eventually faded away too.

After the timber was cut, some of the low land on the west side of McMillan wasn't very suitable for farming. Little was done with it, it burned about every ten years, and much of it went tax delinquent. Krasin and Hartle bought some forties and tried to run a fur farm there. In 1948 the county made 37 forties a public hunting ground. That area reaches from west McMillan into the Town of Spencer along the Little Eau Pleine and has evolved into the McMillan Marsh Wildlife Area - now managed as part of the Mead Wildlife Area.

== Demographics ==
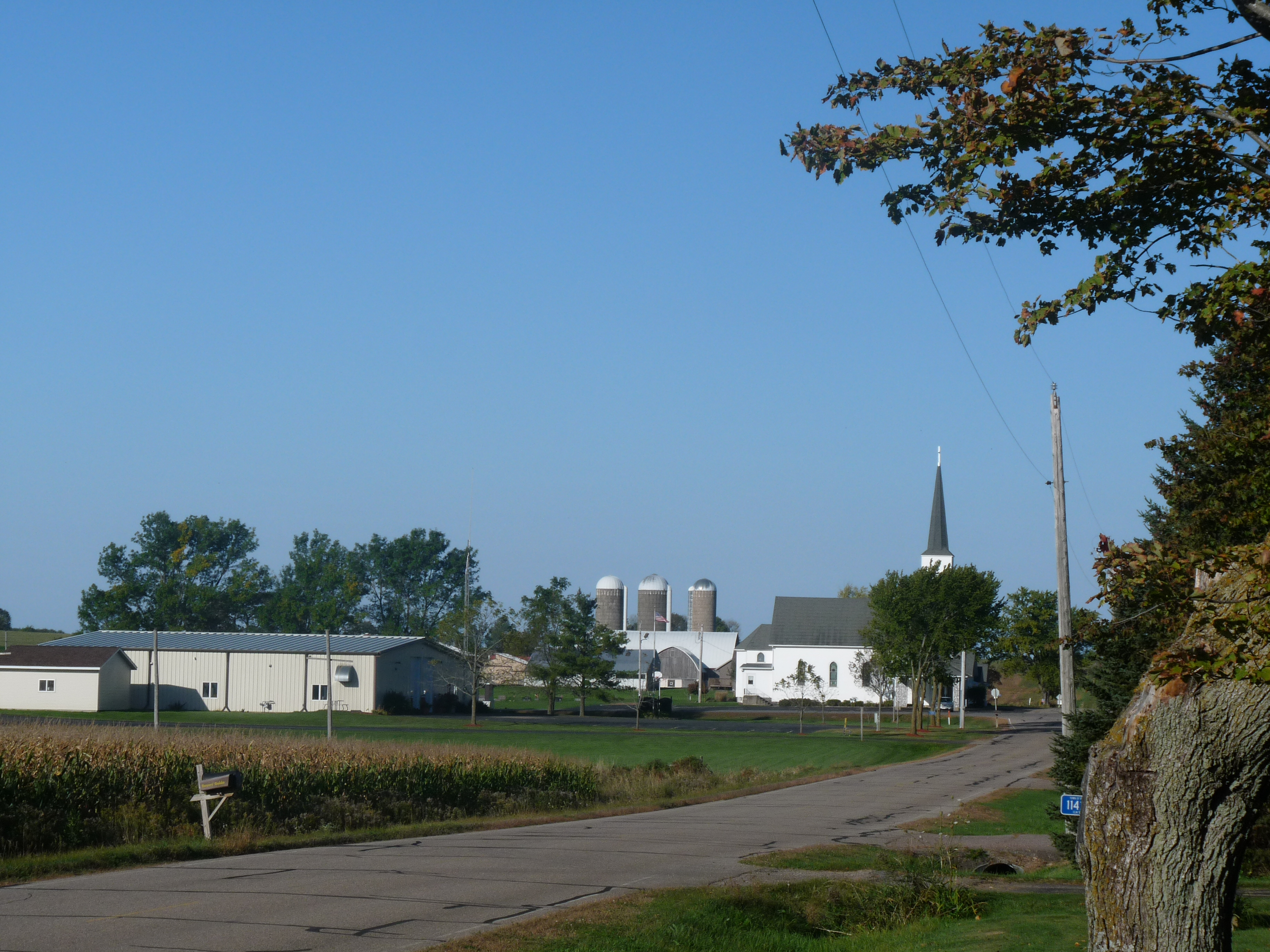
Town center, with the town hall at left, St. Peter's Lutheran at right, and a farm behind

At the 2000 census there were 1,790 people, 611 households, and 521 families living in the town. The population density was 52.0 people per square mile (20.1/km^{2}). There were 631 housing units at an average density of 18.3 per square mile (7.1/km^{2}). The racial makeup of the town was 98.10% White, 0.11% African American, 0.34% Native American, 1.12% Asian, and 0.34% from two or more races. Hispanic or Latino of any race were 0.17%.

Of the 611 households 45.0% had children under the age of 18 living with them, 78.2% were married couples living together, 4.3% had a female householder with no husband present, and 14.6% were non-families. 12.6% of households were one person and 5.4% were one person aged 65 or older. The average household size was 2.93 and the average family size was 3.20.

The age distribution was 30.0% under the age of 18, 5.6% from 18 to 24, 27.5% from 25 to 44, 28.9% from 45 to 64, and 8.0% 65 or older. The median age was 39 years. For every 100 females, there were 101.6 males. For every 100 females age 18 and over, there were 101.8 males.

The median household income was $59,342 and the median family income was $62,400. Males had a median income of $35,688 versus $27,214 for females. The per capita income for the town was $27,161. About 1.1% of families and 2.1% of the population were below the poverty line, including 1.9% of those under age 18 and 6.2% of those age 65 or over.

== Notable people ==
- Ben Lang, farmer, businessman, and politician, lived in the town
