= Mosinee (town), Wisconsin =

Town of Mosinee, Wisconsin
- Town
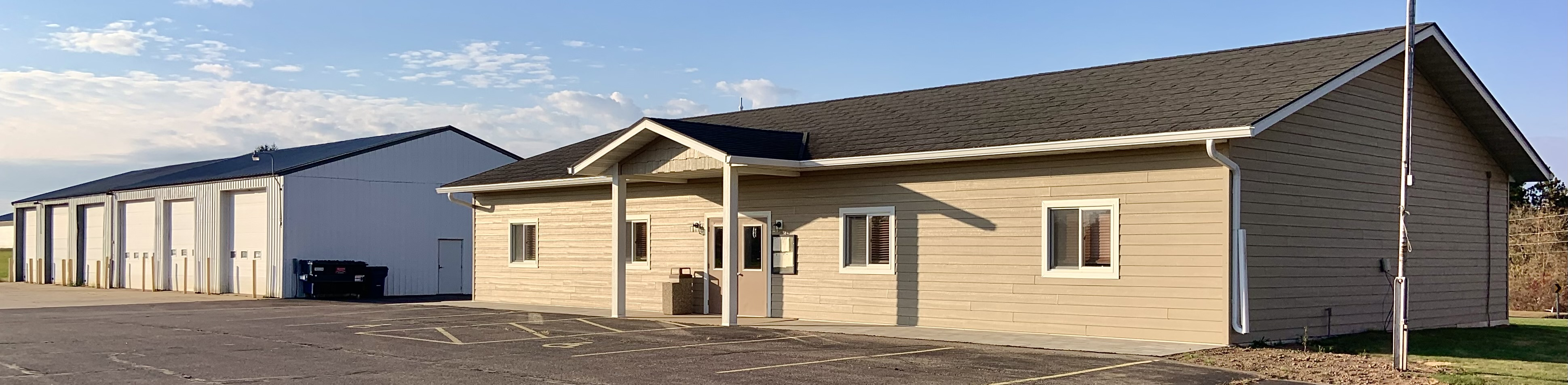
- Town hall

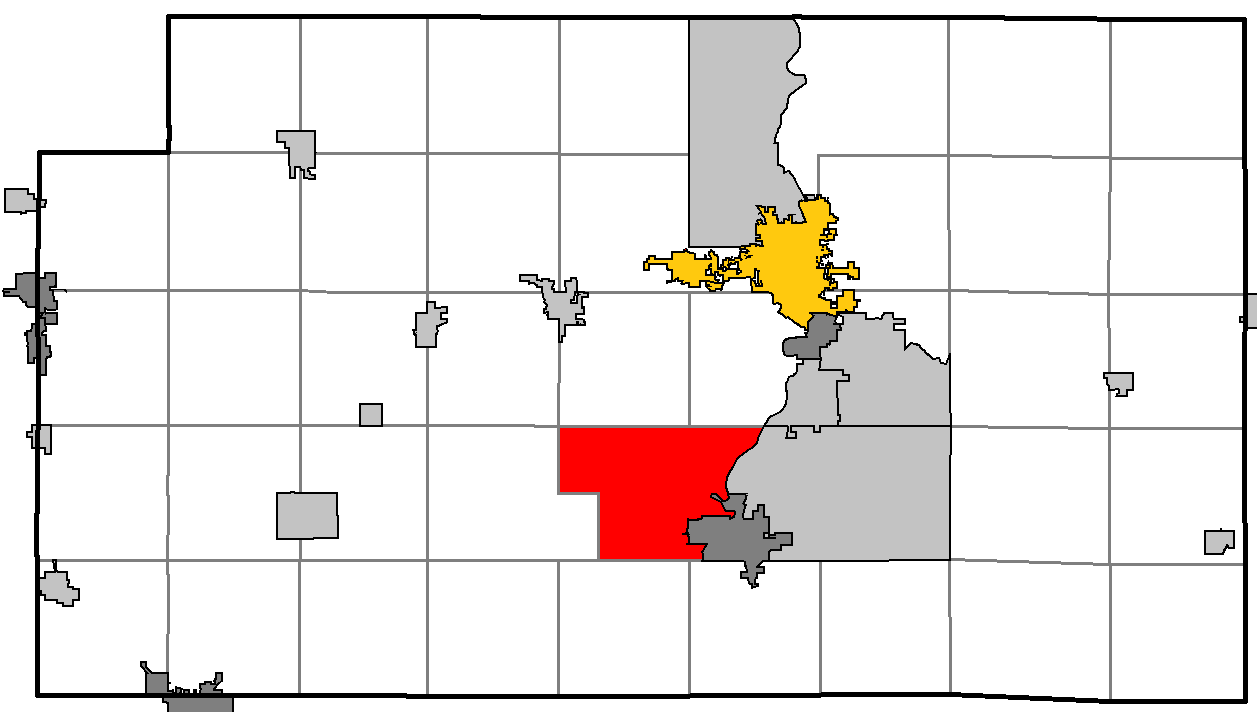
- Location of Mosinee, Marathon County

- Location of Marathon County, Wisconsin
- Coordinates: 44°49′10″N 89°44′20″W
- Country: United States
- State: Wisconsin
- County: Marathon

Area
  - Total: 38.5 sq mi (99.6 km^{2})
  - Land: 37.2 sq mi (96.3 km^{2})
  - Water: 1.3 sq mi (3.3 km^{2})
- Elevation: 1,293 ft (394 m)

Population (2020)
  - Total: 2,216
  - Density: 59.6/sq mi (23.0/km^{2})
- Time zone: UTC-6 (Central (CST))
  - Summer (DST): UTC-5 (CDT)
- Area codes: 715 & 534
- FIPS code: 55-54525
- GNIS feature ID: 1583758
- Website: https://townofmosineewi.gov/

Mosinee is a town in Marathon County, Wisconsin, United States. It is part of the Wausau, Wisconsin Metropolitan Statistical Area. The population was 2,216 at the 2020 census. The unincorporated community of Moon is located partially in the town.

== Geography ==
According to the United States Census Bureau, the town has a total area of 38.5 square miles (99.6 km^{2}), of which 37.2 square miles (96.3 km^{2}) is land and 1.3 square miles (3.3 km^{2}), or 3.28%, is water.

== Demographics ==
As of the census of 2000, there were 2,146 people, 760 households, and 617 families residing in the town. The population density was 57.7 people per square mile (22.3/km^{2}). There were 784 housing units at an average density of 21.1 per square mile (8.1/km^{2}). The racial makeup of the town was 97.95% White, 0.09% Black or African American, 0.51% Native American, 0.56% Asian, 0.09% Pacific Islander, 0.47% from other races, and 0.33% from two or more races. 0.70% of the population were Hispanic or Latino of any race.

There were 760 households, out of which 39.3% had children under the age of 18 living with them, 72.5% were married couples living together, 4.7% had a female householder with no husband present, and 18.8% were non-families. 14.6% of all households were made up of individuals, and 4.5% had someone living alone who was 65 years of age or older. The average household size was 2.82 and the average family size was 3.10.

In the town, the population was spread out, with 28.3% under the age of 18, 6.0% from 18 to 24, 33.0% from 25 to 44, 25.4% from 45 to 64, and 7.3% who were 65 years of age or older. The median age was 36 years. For every 100 females, there were 100.9 males. For every 100 females age 18 and over, there were 105.5 males.

The median income for a household in the town was $55,094, and the median income for a family was $58,750. Males had a median income of $38,516 versus $9 for females. The per capita income for the town was $23,850. About 1.7% of families and 4.0% of the population were below the poverty line, including 6.1% of those under age 18 and 12.6% of those age 65 or over.
