= Richland, Rusk County, Wisconsin =

Richland, Wisconsin
- Town
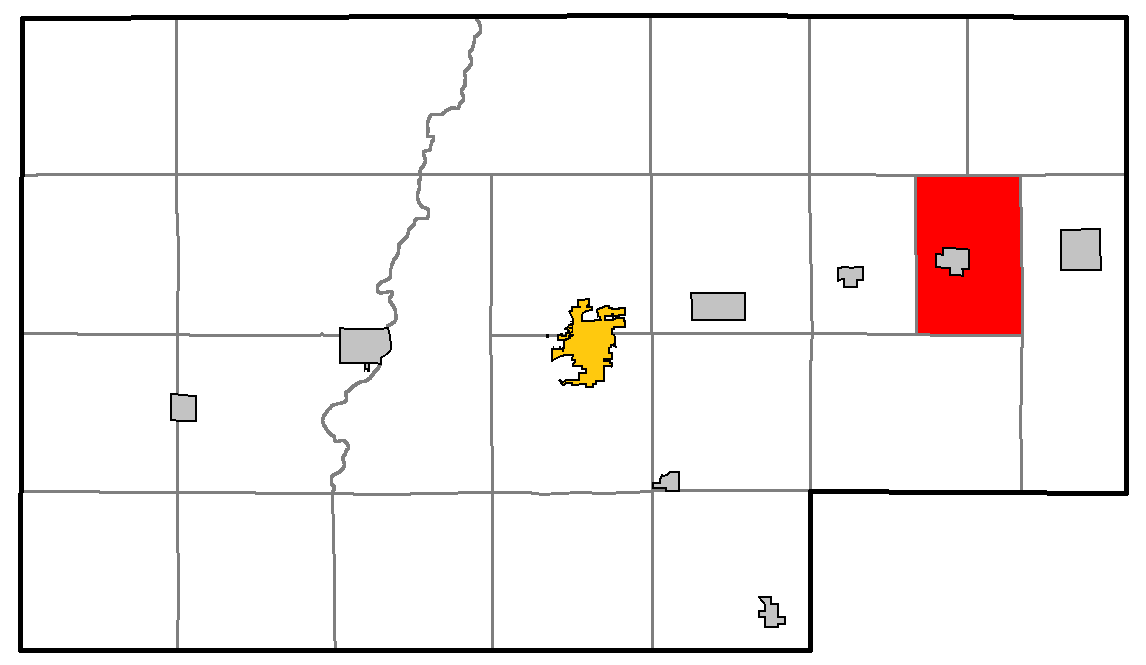
- Location of Richland, within Rusk County

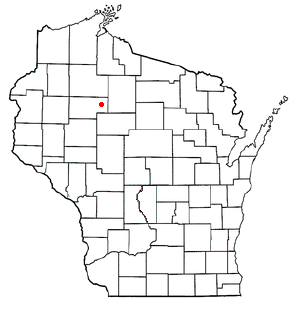
- Location of Richland, Rusk County, Wisconsin
- Coordinates: 45°30′48″N 90°48′25″W
- Country: United States
- State: Wisconsin
- County: Rusk

Area
  - Total: 23.2 sq mi (60.0 km^{2})
  - Land: 23.0 sq mi (59.6 km^{2})
  - Water: 0.15 sq mi (0.4 km^{2})
- Elevation: 1,296 ft (395 m)

Population (2020)
  - Total: 197
  - Density: 8.56/sq mi (3.31/km^{2})
- Time zone: UTC-6 (Central (CST))
  - Summer (DST): UTC-5 (CDT)
- Area codes: 715 & 534
- FIPS code: 55-67600
- GNIS feature ID: 1584026

Richland is a town in Rusk County, Wisconsin, United States. The population was 197 at the 2020 census. The village of Ingram is located in the town.

== Geography ==
According to the United States Census Bureau, the town has a total area of 23.2 square miles (60.0 km^{2}), of which 23.0 square miles (59.6 km^{2}) is land and 0.2 square mile (0.4 km^{2}) (0.65%) is water.

== Demographics ==
As of the census of 2000, there were 206 people, 71 households, and 58 families residing in the town. The population density was 9.0 people per square mile (3.5/km^{2}). There were 111 housing units at an average density of 4.8 per square mile (1.9/km^{2}). The racial makeup of the town was 96.60% White, 0.49% African American, 0.97% Native American, 0.97% Asian, and 0.97% from two or more races.

There were 71 households, out of which 36.6% had children under the age of 18 living with them, 63.4% were married couples living together, 7.0% had a female householder with no husband present, and 18.3% were non-families. 16.9% of all households were made up of individuals, and 7.0% had someone living alone who was 65 years of age or older. The average household size was 2.90 and the average family size was 3.14.

In the town, the population was spread out, with 28.6% under the age of 18, 7.8% from 18 to 24, 24.3% from 25 to 44, 25.7% from 45 to 64, and 13.6% who were 65 years of age or older. The median age was 39 years. For every 100 females, there were 102.0 males. For every 100 females age 18 and over, there were 113.0 males.

The median income for a household in the town was $34,844, and the median income for a family was $37,500. Males had a median income of $26,250 versus $20,000 for females. The per capita income for the town was $15,256. About 5.6% of families and 4.8% of the population were below the poverty line, including 11.7% of those under the age of eighteen and none of those 65 or over.
