= Dewey, Rusk County, Wisconsin =

Dewey, Wisconsin
- Town
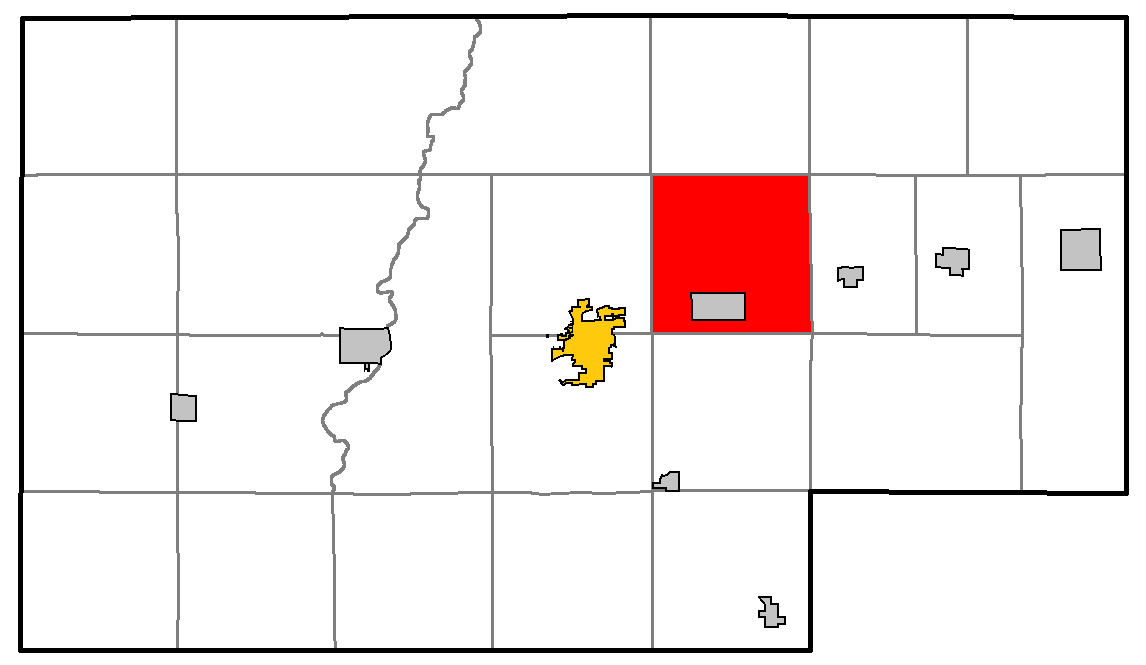
- Location of Dewey, within Rusk County

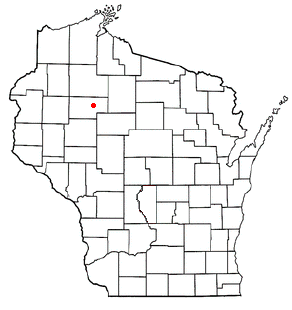
- Location of Dewey, Rusk County, Wisconsin
- Coordinates: 45°30′3″N 90°59′59″W
- Country: United States
- State: Wisconsin
- County: Rusk

Area
  - Total: 34.1 sq mi (88.2 km^{2})
  - Land: 31.0 sq mi (80.4 km^{2})
  - Water: 3.0 sq mi (7.8 km^{2})
- Elevation: 1,240 ft (380 m)

Population (2020)
  - Total: 542
  - Density: 17.5/sq mi (6.74/km^{2})
- Time zone: UTC-6 (Central (CST))
  - Summer (DST): UTC-5 (CDT)
- Area codes: 715 & 534
- FIPS code: 55-20000
- GNIS feature ID: 1583081

Dewey is a town in Rusk County, Wisconsin, United States. As of the 2020 census, the town had a total population of 542.

== Geography ==
According to the United States Census Bureau, the town has a total area of 34.0 square miles (88.2 km^{2}), of which 31.0 square miles (80.4 km^{2}) is land and 3.0 square miles (7.8 km^{2}) (8.87%) is water.

== Demographics ==
As of the census of 2000, there were 523 people, 209 households, and 155 families residing in the town. The population density was 16.9 people per square mile (6.5/km^{2}). There were 277 housing units at an average density of 8.9 per square mile (3.4/km^{2}). The racial makeup of the town was 99.24% White, 0.19% Native American, 0.19% Asian, and 0.38% from two or more races. Hispanic or Latino of any race were 0.19% of the population.

There were 209 households, out of which 27.8% had children under the age of 18 living with them, 63.2% were married couples living together, 6.7% had a female householder with no husband present, and 25.4% were non-families. 23.9% of all households were made up of individuals, and 12.4% had someone living alone who was 65 years of age or older. The average household size was 2.50 and the average family size was 2.94.

In the town, the population was spread out, with 25.4% under the age of 18, 4.2% from 18 to 24, 22.8% from 25 to 44, 27.3% from 45 to 64, and 20.3% who were 65 years of age or older. The median age was 43 years. For every 100 females, there were 101.2 males. For every 100 females age 18 and over, there were 100.0 males.

The median income for a household in the town was $38,056, and the median income for a family was $42,292. Males had a median income of $30,938 versus $25,917 for females. The per capita income for the town was $18,740. About 4.9% of families and 7.7% of the population were below the poverty line, including 7.6% of those under age 18 and 16.2% of those age 65 or over.
