= Wilson, Rusk County, Wisconsin =

Wilson, Wisconsin
- Town
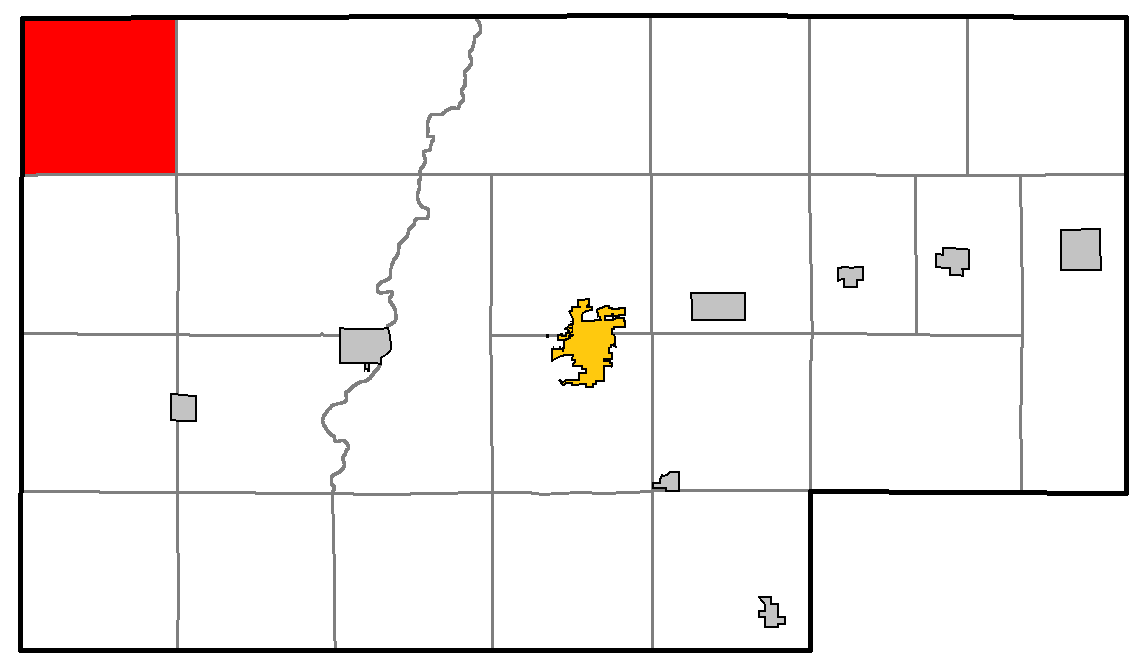
- Location of Wilson, within Rusk County

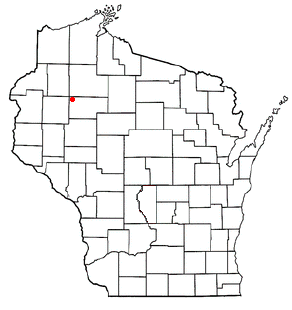
- Location of Wilson, Rusk County, Wisconsin
- Coordinates: 45°35′5″N 91°29′8″W
- Country: United States
- State: Wisconsin
- County: Rusk

Area
  - Total: 34.4 sq mi (89.2 km^{2})
  - Land: 34.1 sq mi (88.3 km^{2})
  - Water: 0.35 sq mi (0.9 km^{2})
- Elevation: 1,522 ft (464 m)

Population (2020)
  - Total: 116
  - Density: 3.40/sq mi (1.31/km^{2})
- Time zone: UTC-6 (Central (CST))
  - Summer (DST): UTC-5 (CDT)
- Area codes: 715 & 534
- FIPS code: 55-87450
- GNIS feature ID: 1584446

Wilson is a town in Rusk County, Wisconsin, United States. The population was 116 at the 2020 census.

== Geography ==
According to the United States Census Bureau, the town has a total area of 34.4 square miles (89.2 km^{2}), of which 34.1 square miles (88.3 km^{2}) is land and 0.3 square mile (0.9 km^{2}) (0.99%) is water.

== Demographics ==
As of the census of 2000, there were 84 people, 30 households, and 24 families residing in the town. The population density was 2.5 people per square mile (1.0/km^{2}). There were 33 housing units at an average density of 1.0 per square mile (0.4/km^{2}). The racial makeup of the town was 95.24% White and 4.76% Asian.

There were 30 households, out of which 30.0% had children under the age of 18 living with them, 70.0% were married couples living together, 6.7% had a female householder with no husband present, and 20.0% were non-families. 20.0% of all households were made up of individuals, and 16.7% had someone living alone who was 65 years of age or older. The average household size was 2.80 and the average family size was 3.25.

In the town, the population was spread out, with 27.4% under the age of 18, 7.1% from 18 to 24, 20.2% from 25 to 44, 32.1% from 45 to 64, and 13.1% who were 65 years of age or older. The median age was 43 years. For every 100 females, there were 115.4 males. For every 100 females age 18 and over, there were 117.9 males.

The median income for a household in the town was $33,438, and the median income for a family was $34,375. Males had a median income of $40,833 versus $27,083 for females. The per capita income for the town was $15,751. None of the population or families were below the poverty line.
