= Willard, Wisconsin =

Willard, Wisconsin may refer to:

- Willard, Clark County, Wisconsin, an unincorporated community in Clark County
- Willard, Rusk County, Wisconsin, a town in Rusk County
