= Washington, Rusk County, Wisconsin =

Washington, Wisconsin
- Town
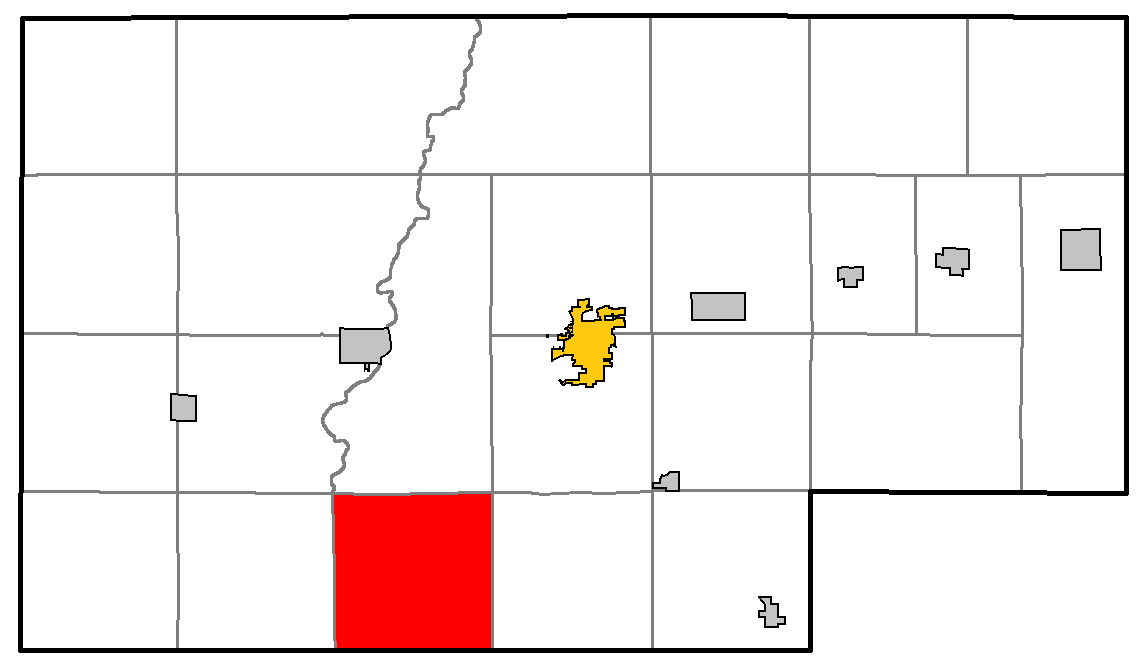
- Location of Washington, within Rusk County

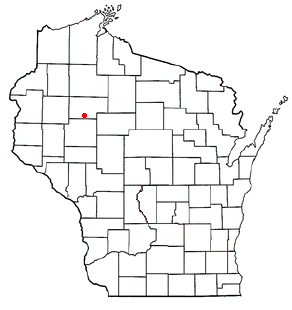
- Location of Washington, Rusk County, Wisconsin
- Coordinates: 45°19′41″N 91°14′7″W
- Country: United States
- State: Wisconsin
- County: Rusk

Area
  - Total: 35.6 sq mi (92.3 km^{2})
  - Land: 33.7 sq mi (87.3 km^{2})
  - Water: 1.9 sq mi (5.0 km^{2})
- Elevation: 1,070 ft (330 m)

Population (2020)
  - Total: 360
  - Density: 11/sq mi (4.1/km^{2})
- Time zone: UTC-6 (Central (CST))
  - Summer (DST): UTC-5 (CDT)
- Area codes: 715 & 534
- FIPS code: 55-83675
- GNIS feature ID: 1584356
- Website: https://www.townofwashingtonruskcounty.com/

Washington is a town in Rusk County, Wisconsin, United States. The population was 360 at the 2020 census.

== Geography ==
According to the United States Census Bureau, the town has a total area of 35.6 square miles (92.3 km^{2}), of which 33.7 square miles (87.3 km^{2}) is land and 1.9 square miles (4.9 km^{2}) (5.36%) is water.

== Demographics ==
As of the census of 2000, there were 312 people, 134 households, and 99 families residing in the town. The population density was 9.3 people per square mile (3.6/km^{2}). There were 238 housing units at an average density of 7.1 per square mile (2.7/km^{2}). The racial makeup of the town was 97.44% White, 0.32% African American, 0.32% Pacific Islander, 0.32% from other races, and 1.60% from two or more races. Hispanic or Latino of any race were 0.96% of the population.

There were 134 households, out of which 17.9% had children under the age of 18 living with them, 67.9% were married couples living together, 0.7% had a female householder with no husband present, and 26.1% were non-families. 23.9% of all households were made up of individuals, and 10.4% had someone living alone who was 65 years of age or older. The average household size was 2.33 and the average family size was 2.66.

In the town, the population was spread out, with 17.9% under the age of 18, 3.5% from 18 to 24, 18.6% from 25 to 44, 35.6% from 45 to 64, and 24.4% who were 65 years of age or older. The median age was 50 years. For every 100 females, there were 112.2 males. For every 100 females age 18 and over, there were 111.6 males.

The median income for a household in the town was $29,231, and the median income for a family was $36,500. Males had a median income of $25,893 versus $19,167 for females. The per capita income for the town was $15,533. About 7.0% of families and 10.7% of the population were below the poverty line, including 25.0% of those under age 18 and 2.3% of those age 65 or over.
