= Flambeau, Wisconsin =

Flambeau is the name of some places in the U.S. state of Wisconsin:

- Flambeau, Price County, Wisconsin
- Flambeau, Rusk County, Wisconsin
