= Grow, Wisconsin =

- Town
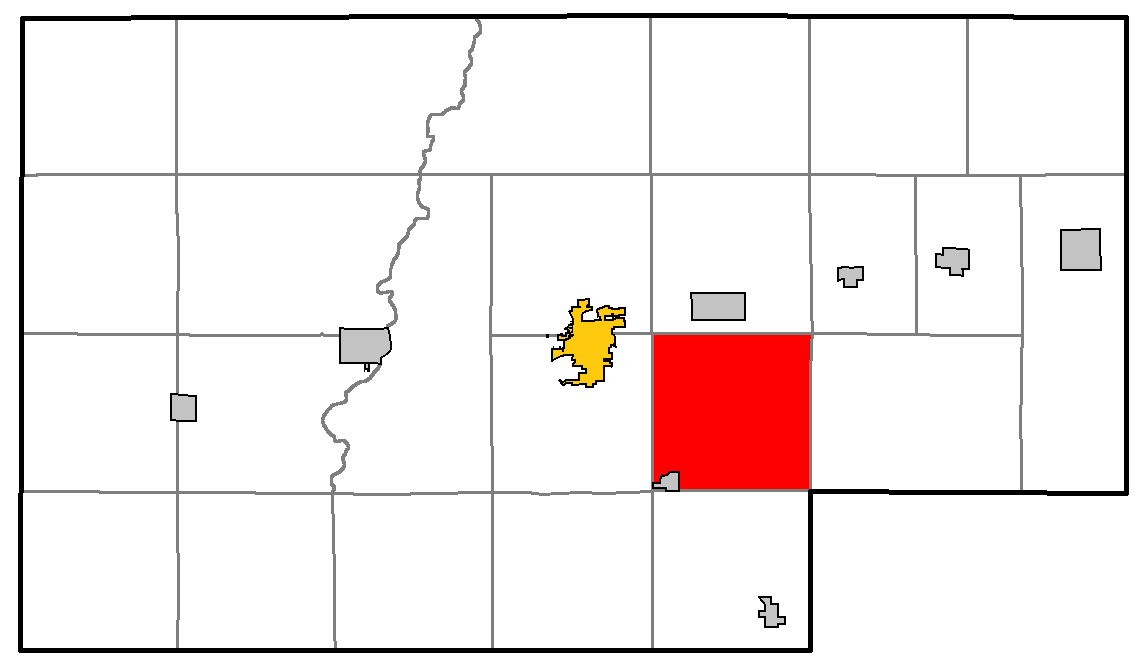
- Location of Grow within Rusk County

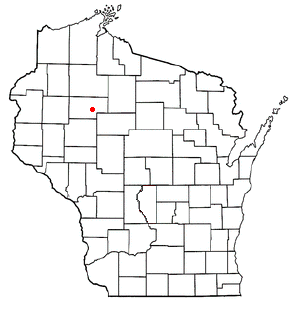
- Location of Grow, Wisconsin
- Coordinates: 45°25′0″N 90°59′41″W
- Country: United States
- State: Wisconsin
- County: Rusk

Area
  - Total: 35.4 sq mi (91.7 km^{2})
  - Land: 35.4 sq mi (91.7 km^{2})
  - Water: 0 sq mi (0.0 km^{2})
- Elevation: 1,175 ft (358 m)

Population (2020)
  - Total: 443
  - Density: 12.5/sq mi (4.83/km^{2})
- Time zone: UTC-6 (Central (CST))
  - Summer (DST): UTC-5 (CDT)
- Area codes: 715 & 534
- FIPS code: 55-31775
- GNIS feature ID: 1583329

Grow is a town in Rusk County, Wisconsin, United States. The population was 443 at the 2020 census.

== Geography ==
According to the United States Census Bureau, the town has a total area of 35.4 square miles (91.7 km^{2}), all land.

== Demographics ==
As of the census of 2000, there were 473 people, 160 households, and 127 families residing in the town. The population density was 13.4 people per square mile (5.2/km^{2}). There were 175 housing units at an average density of 4.9 per square mile (1.9/km^{2}). The racial makeup of the town was 99.15% White, 0.21% African American, 0.21% Asian, and 0.42% from two or more races. Hispanic or Latino of any race were 0.63% of the population.

There were 160 households, out of which 38.1% had children under the age of 18 living with them, 65.6% were married couples living together, 10.0% had a female householder with no husband present, and 20.6% were non-families. 17.5% of all households were made up of individuals, and 13.8% had someone living alone who was 65 years of age or older. The average household size was 2.96 and the average family size was 3.39.

In the town, the population was spread out, with 33.2% under the age of 18, 7.0% from 18 to 24, 22.6% from 25 to 44, 23.5% from 45 to 64, and 13.7% who were 65 years of age or older. The median age was 35 years. For every 100 females, there were 106.6 males. For every 100 females age 18 and over, there were 106.5 males.

The median income for a household in the town was $36,484, and the median income for a family was $40,000. Males had a median income of $25,500 versus $22,000 for females. The per capita income for the town was $13,133. About 12.2% of families and 18.2% of the population were below the poverty line, including 24.2% of those under age 18 and 19.0% of those age 65 or over.
