= Rusk, Wisconsin =

Rusk is the name of some places in the U.S. state of Wisconsin:

- Rusk, Burnett County, Wisconsin, a town
- Rusk, Dunn County, Wisconsin, an unincorporated community
- Rusk, Rusk County, Wisconsin, a town
