= Lawrence, Wisconsin =

Lawrence is the name of some places in the U.S. state of Wisconsin:

- Lawrence, Brown County, Wisconsin, a town
- Lawrence, Marquette County, Wisconsin, an unincorporated community
- Lawrence, Rusk County, Wisconsin, a town

== Other ==
- St. Lawrence, Wisconsin, a town
- Saint Lawrence (community), Wisconsin, an unincorporated community
