= Strickland, Wisconsin =

- Town
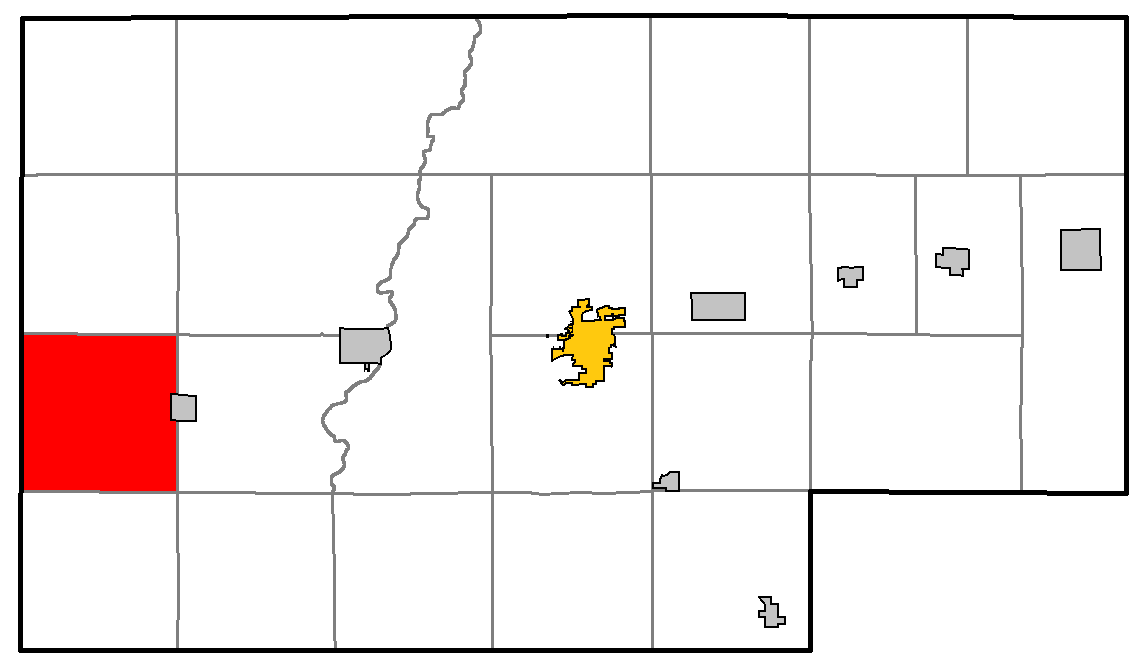
- Location of Strickland, within Rusk County

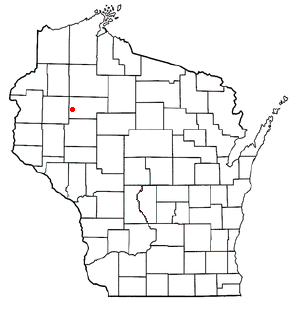
- Location of Strickland, Wisconsin
- Coordinates: 45°25′20″N 91°28′58″W
- Country: United States
- State: Wisconsin
- County: Rusk

Area
  - Total: 35.1 sq mi (90.9 km^{2})
  - Land: 34.7 sq mi (89.9 km^{2})
  - Water: 0.39 sq mi (1.0 km^{2})
- Elevation: 1,326 ft (404 m)

Population (2020)
  - Total: 280
  - Density: 8.1/sq mi (3.1/km^{2})
- Time zone: UTC-6 (Central (CST))
  - Summer (DST): UTC-5 (CDT)
- Area codes: 715 & 534
- FIPS code: 55-77775
- GNIS feature ID: 1584235

The Town of Strickland is located in Rusk County, Wisconsin, United States. The population was 280 at the 2020 census.

== Geography ==
According to the United States Census Bureau, the town has a total area of 35.1 square miles (90.9 km^{2}), of which 34.7 square miles (89.9 km^{2}) is land and 0.4 square mile (1.0 km^{2}) (1.14%) is water.

== Demographics ==
As of the census of 2000, there were 300 people, 113 households, and 87 families residing in the town. The population density was 8.6 people per square mile (3.3/km^{2}). There were 160 housing units at an average density of 4.6 per square mile (1.8/km^{2}). The racial makeup of the town was 94.67% White, 4.00% from other races, and 1.33% from two or more races. Hispanic or Latino of any race were 4.00% of the population.

There were 113 households, out of which 24.8% had children under the age of 18 living with them, 61.9% were married couples living together, 7.1% had a female householder with no husband present, and 23.0% were non-families. 18.6% of all households were made up of individuals, and 10.6% had someone living alone who was 65 years of age or older. The average household size was 2.65 and the average family size was 3.00.

In the town, the population was spread out, with 22.7% under the age of 18, 8.0% from 18 to 24, 25.0% from 25 to 44, 29.0% from 45 to 64, and 15.3% who were 65 years of age or older. The median age was 42 years. For every 100 females, there were 114.3 males. For every 100 females age 18 and over, there were 123.1 males.

The median income for a household in the town was $30,469, and the median income for a family was $32,750. Males had a median income of $30,781 versus $23,021 for females. The per capita income for the town was $15,353. About 6.7% of families and 11.8% of the population were below the poverty line, including 5.1% of those under the age of eighteen and 17.5% of those 65 or over.
