= Lawrence, Rusk County, Wisconsin =

Lawrence, Wisconsin
- Town
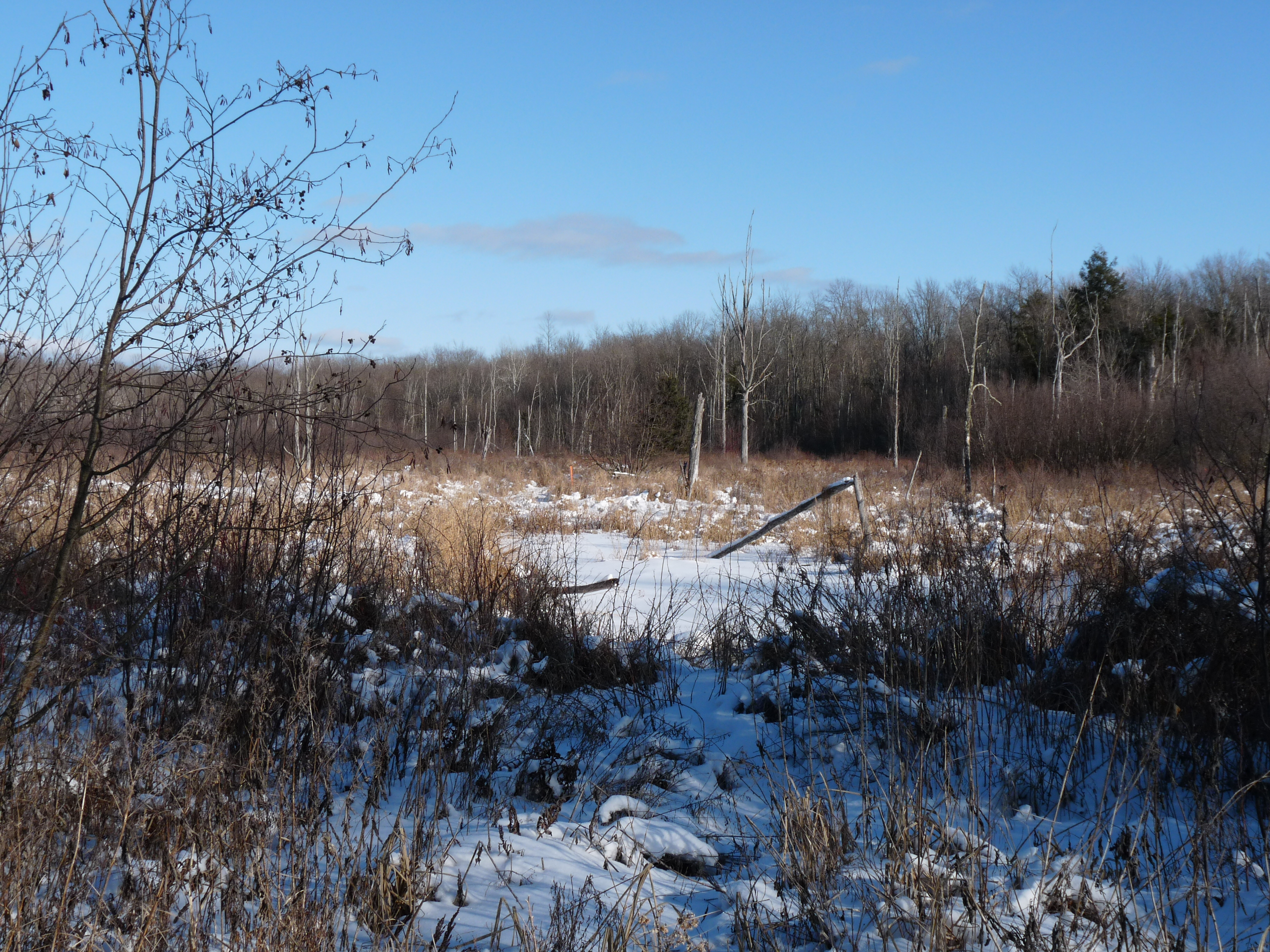
- Much of Lawrence is wild land, accessed only by hunters and winter loggers who drive in over frozen swamps.

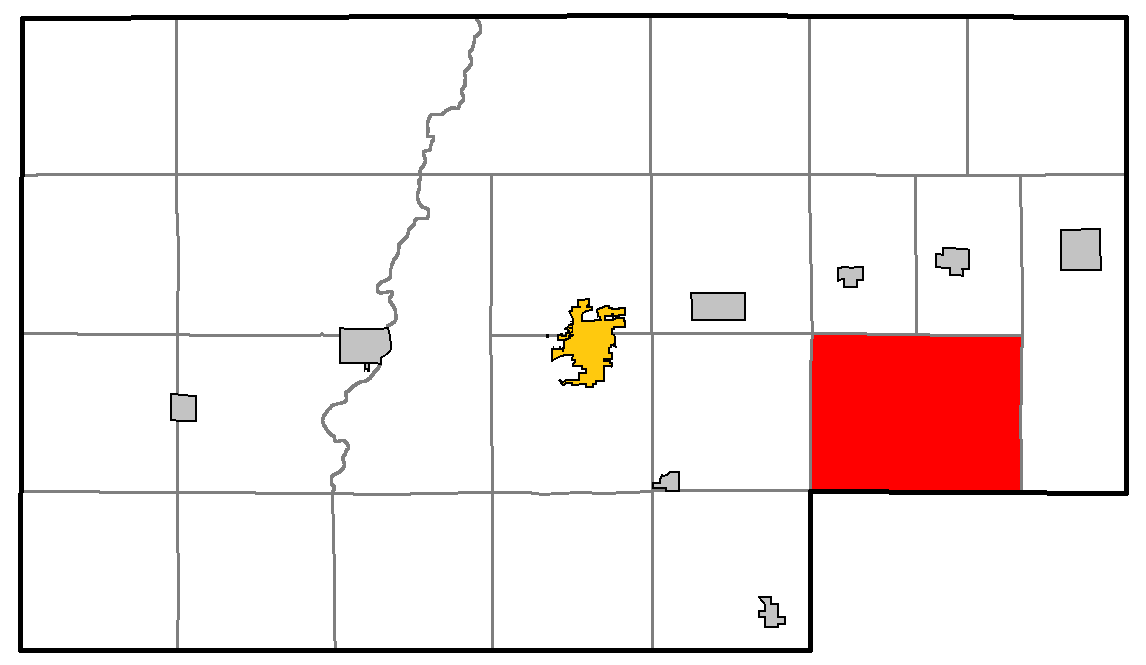
- Location of Lawrence within Rusk County

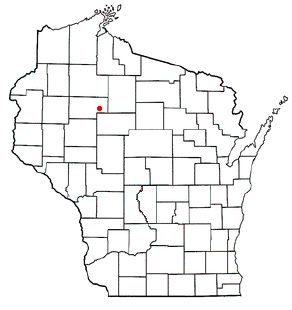
- Location of Lawrence, Rusk County, Wisconsin
- Coordinates: 45°26′15″N 90°51′32″W
- Country: United States
- State: Wisconsin
- County: Rusk

Area
  - Total: 47.7 sq mi (123.6 km^{2})
  - Land: 47.7 sq mi (123.6 km^{2})
  - Water: 0 sq mi (0.0 km^{2})
- Elevation: 1,224 ft (373 m)

Population (2020)
  - Total: 301
  - Density: 6.31/sq mi (2.44/km^{2})
- Time zone: UTC-6 (Central (CST))
  - Summer (DST): UTC-5 (CDT)
- Area codes: 715 & 534
- FIPS code: 55-42950
- GNIS feature ID: 1583535
- PLSS township: T34N R4W and western 2 miles of T34N R3W

Lawrence is a town in Rusk County in north-central Wisconsin, United States. The population was 301 at the 2020 census. The town is rural - all farmland or forest.

== Geography ==
The town is 8 miles by 6 miles. According to the United States Census Bureau, the town has a total area of 47.7 square miles (123.6 km^{2}), all land.

Branches of Main Creek, Little Jump River, and Alder Creek flow through the township, all generally heading to the west-southwest. The terrain is dominated by low parallel ridges running in that direction. These ridges could be drumlins left by a glacial advance, or they could mask the shape of the bedrock beneath the glacial till.

== History ==
Like most of northern Wisconsin, the area that would become Lawrence was Ojibwe territory in the years before white contact.

Some of the earliest European Americans to walk the six mile squares that would become Lawrence were the U.S. government's surveyors. In 1847 they surveyed the outsides of the six mile squares on foot with chain and compass. Then others came back in 1855 to survey all the section lines. When done, the deputy surveyor filed this general description for the western six miles of what would become Lawrence:

This Township contains several swamps; and all are unfit for cultivation. The Alder and Meadow Bottoms are all subject to be overflowed to a depth of 1 too 2 feet. the Meadow Bottoms are good for Hay. The surface is level. a small portion is upland where the soil is 2d rate. This Township is heavily Timbered and is chiefly composed of Hemlock Y Birch W Pine and maple on 3d rate soil. on 2d rate soil it is Sugar, Linden white Pine, Balsam and Elm. The undergrowth is Generally thick and is composed of Hemlock Balsam and Hazel Elm and Balsam line the Margin of the Alder and Meadow bottoms and also most of the Streams. There is no improvements in this Township.

An 1880 map of the area showed no development in Lawrence. The closest was a logging tote road from Chippewa Falls passing four miles to the west, following Main Creek. It crossed over to a couple logging camps(?) on the Flambeau and then followed that river northeast to Phillips.

The 1888 plat map of what would become Lawrence still showed no improvements and no settlers. Much of the land was still in large blocks, with the largest landholders H.W. Sage & Co., Cornell University, Bond Bros, and Empire Lumber Co.

The 1901 plat map showed a wagon road following the course of modern County B down from Glen Flora into the northwest corner of Lawrence, with a handful of settlers along it. Another road of some sort was drawn in following the course of modern Highway 73 from north to south. Another north-south road, which disappeared on later maps, was drawn in two miles west of 73. A.E. Walrath owned large blocks in the west. Cornell University owned large blocks in the east and middle. Sage Land and Improvement Co. and Mississippi River Lumber Co. also owned significant shares.

Walrath, now a ghost town, was a little mill town in Lawrence, initially called Vallee. As mentioned above, Alvin E. Walrath owned much of what would become Lawrence township by 1901. At some point he started a mill that cut chair rounds from his surrounding forests. Walrath also built a boarding house and store for his workers. A box factory and lath mill were added later. By 1911, the Stanley, Merrill and Phillips Railway had run its line up from Jump River to Walrath and built a depot. At first there was no turnaround, so the train backed in from Jump River, then unloaded supplies and loaded wood products, then steamed back out. In 1916 Walrath got a post office - in 1919 a school. Around 1920 Walrath began pushing to sell his cutover land to settlers through the National Land Colonization Company. Eventually the mills closed and the railroad pulled out. The Walrath school consolidated with Glen Flora around 1953. Now not much remains of the little mill town.

The 1914 plat maps showed more settlers in the northwest corner, near Glen Flora, and one in the northeast. It also showed a forerunner of Hunter Lane entering the town in the southeast from Jump River way, with a few settlers east of it. The other new thing was the Stanley, Merrill and Phillips Railway angling up into the town from Jump River. Major land-owners were A.E. Walrath in the west, John S. Owen Lumber Company in the east and southwest, and the Northwestern Lumber Co. (parent of the SM&P) along their rail line.

Plat maps from between 1915 and 1920 showed Lawrence's modern road grid more or less complete, though the roads were no doubt rough wagon tracks. Highway 73 is marked with that name. The northern two miles is largely broken into 40 and 80 acre farms. South of that, much of the town is in large blocks owned by A.E. Walrath and John S. Owen Lumber Co. A Ladysmith News article from 1923 stated that some of the last timber in the county was "...still standing in the southeastern townships. It is safe to predict that practically all of Rusk county will be clear of its merchantable timber within ten years..."

== Demographics ==
As of the census of 2000, there were 240 people, 90 households, and 56 families residing in the town. The population density was 5.0 people per square mile (1.9/km^{2}). There were 111 housing units at an average density of 2.3 per square mile (0.9/km^{2}). The racial makeup of the town was 99.58% White and 0.42% Native American. Hispanic or Latino of any race were 1.67% of the population.

There were 90 households, out of which 35.6% had children under the age of 18 living with them, 54.4% were married couples living together, 6.7% had a female householder with no husband present, and 36.7% were non-families. 30.0% of all households were made up of individuals, and 8.9% had someone living alone who was 65 years of age or older. The average household size was 2.67 and the average family size was 3.44.

In the town, the population was spread out, with 30.0% under the age of 18, 11.7% from 18 to 24, 29.6% from 25 to 44, 19.6% from 45 to 64, and 9.2% who were 65 years of age or older. The median age was 31 years. For every 100 females, there were 112.4 males. For every 100 females age 18 and over, there were 112.7 males.

The median income for a household in the town was $35,313, and the median family income was $35,972. Males had a median income of $23,750 versus $21,750 for females. The per capita income for the town was $17,031. About 18.0% of families and 24.5% of the population were below the poverty line, including 33.8% of those under the age of eighteen and none of those 65 or over.
