= Thornapple, Wisconsin =

Town of Thornapple
- Town
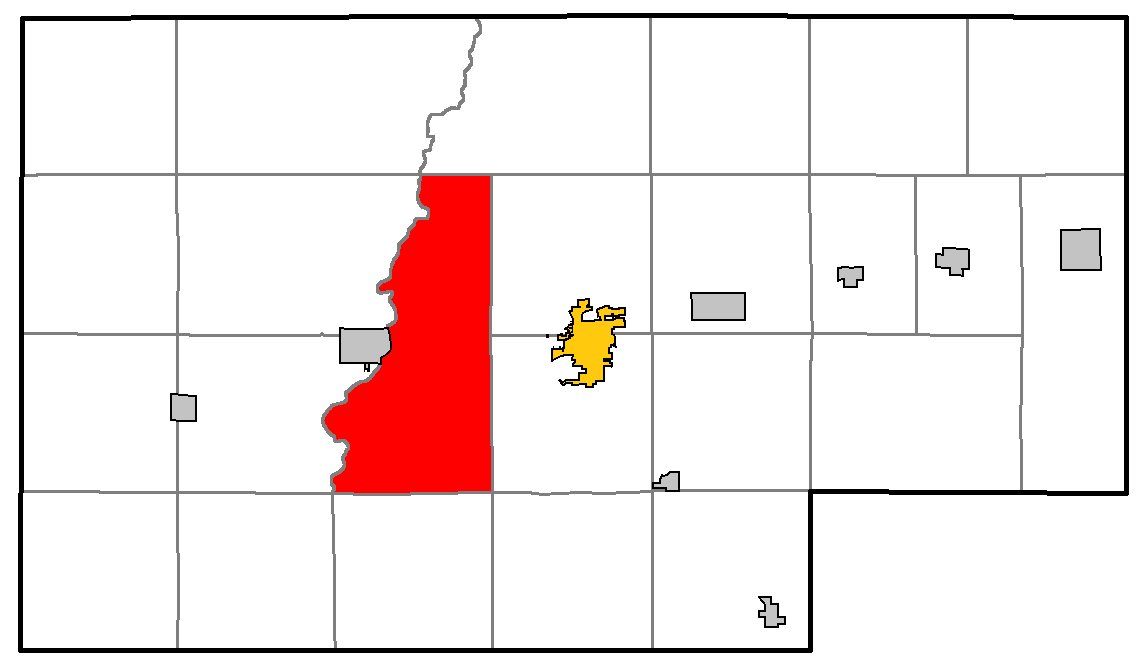
- Location of Thornapple, within Rusk County

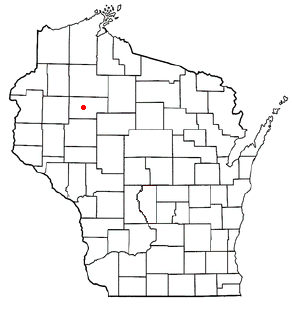
- Location of the Town of Thornapple
- Coordinates: 45°27′30″N 91°13′36″W
- Country: United States
- State: Wisconsin
- County: Rusk

Area
  - Total: 52.6 sq mi (136.2 km^{2})
  - Land: 51.4 sq mi (133.0 km^{2})
  - Water: 1.2 sq mi (3.2 km^{2})
- Elevation: 1,139 ft (347 m)

Population (2020)
  - Total: 721
  - Density: 14.0/sq mi (5.42/km^{2})
- Time zone: UTC-6 (Central (CST))
  - Summer (DST): UTC-5 (CDT)
- Area codes: 715 & 534
- FIPS code: 55-79575
- GNIS feature ID: 1584274
- Website: https://townofthornapple.org/

The Town of Thornapple is located in Rusk County, Wisconsin, United States. The population was 721 at the 2020 census. The unincorporated community of Thornapple is located in the town.

== Geography ==
According to the United States Census Bureau, the town has a total area of 52.6 square miles (136.2 km^{2}), of which 51.4 square miles (133.0 km^{2}) is land and 1.2 square miles (3.2 km^{2}) (2.36%) is water.

== Demographics ==
As of the census of 2000, there were 811 people, 312 households, and 237 families residing in the town. The population density was 15.8 people per square mile (6.1/km^{2}). There were 375 housing units at an average density of 7.3 per square mile (2.8/km^{2}). The racial makeup of the town was 96.92% White, 1.11% African American, 0.37% Native American, 0.25% Asian, 0.74% from other races, and 0.62% from two or more races. Hispanic or Latino of any race were 0.99% of the population.

There were 312 households, out of which 31.4% had children under the age of 18 living with them, 66.0% were married couples living together, 4.8% had a female householder with no husband present, and 24.0% were non-families. 19.6% of all households were made up of individuals, and 8.3% had someone living alone who was 65 years of age or older. The average household size was 2.60 and the average family size was 2.95.

In the town, the population was spread out, with 26.3% under the age of 18, 5.3% from 18 to 24, 27.4% from 25 to 44, 24.5% from 45 to 64, and 16.5% who were 65 years of age or older. The median age was 40 years. For every 100 females, there were 101.2 males. For every 100 females age 18 and over, there were 101.3 males.

The median income for a household in the town was $35,625, and the median income for a family was $38,750. Males had a median income of $32,171 versus $22,639 for females. The per capita income for the town was $16,095. About 9.4% of families and 10.9% of the population were below the poverty line, including 13.5% of those under age 18 and 5.9% of those age 65 or over.
