= True, Wisconsin =

- Town
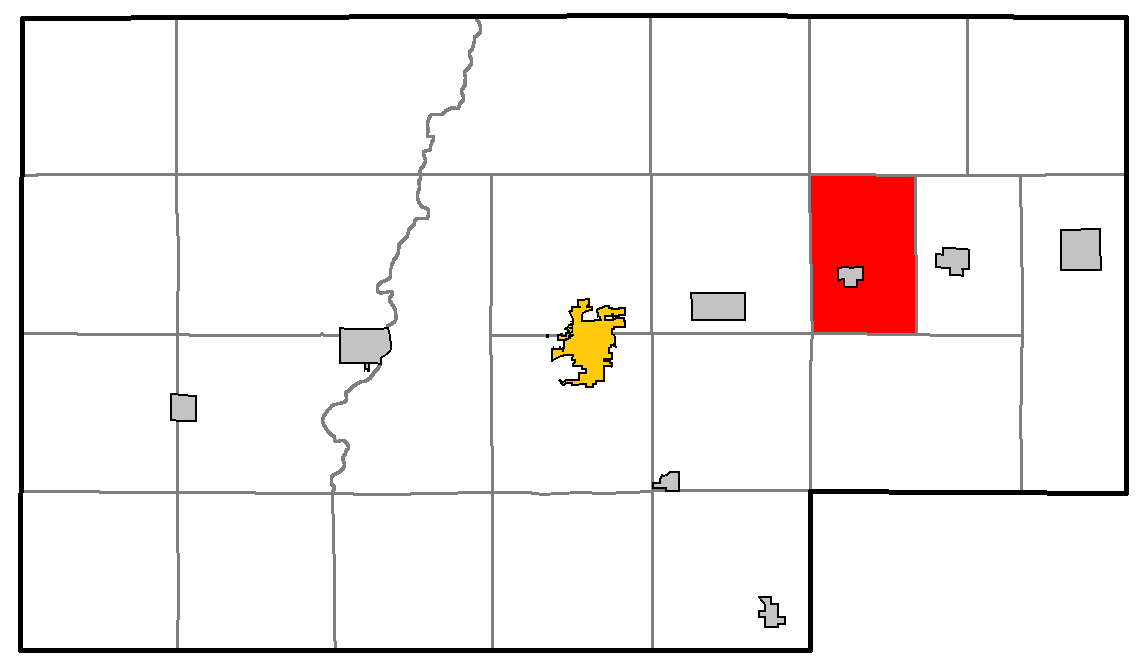
- Location of True, within Rusk County

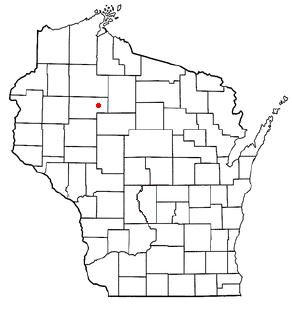
- Location of True, Wisconsin
- Coordinates: 45°29′53″N 90°52′57″W
- Country: United States
- State: Wisconsin
- County: Rusk

Area
  - Total: 23.5 sq mi (60.8 km^{2})
  - Land: 23.3 sq mi (60.4 km^{2})
  - Water: 0.19 sq mi (0.5 km^{2})
- Elevation: 1,286 ft (392 m)

Population (2020)
  - Total: 237
  - Density: 10.2/sq mi (3.92/km^{2})
- Time zone: UTC-6 (Central (CST))
  - Summer (DST): UTC-5 (CDT)
- Area codes: 715 & 534
- FIPS code: 55-80950
- GNIS feature ID: 1584300

True is a town in Rusk County, Wisconsin, United States. The population was 237 at the 2020 census. The village of Glen Flora is within the town.

== Geography ==
According to the United States Census Bureau, the town has an area of 23.5 square miles (60.8 km^{2}), of which 23.3 square miles (60.3 km^{2}) is land and 0.2 square mile (0.5 km^{2}) (0.81%) is water.

== Demographics ==
As of the census of 2000, there were 291 people, 107 households, and 83 families residing in the town. The population density was 12.5 people per square mile (4.8/km^{2}). There were 127 housing units at an average density of 5.5 per square mile (2.1/km^{2}). The racial makeup of the town was 99.66% White and 0.34% Pacific Islander.

There were 107 households, of which 36.4% had children under the age of 18 living with them, 64.5% were married couples living together, 7.5% had a female householder with no husband present, and 22.4% were non-families. 19.6% of all households were made up of individuals, and 11.2% had someone living alone who was 65 years of age or older. The average household size was 2.72 and the average family size was 3.10.

In the town, the population was spread out, with 25.8% under the age of 18, 9.3% from 18 to 24, 27.8% from 25 to 44, 24.1% from 45 to 64, and 13.1% who were 65 years of age or older. The median age was 39. For every 100 females, there were 122.1 males. For every 100 females age 18 and over, there were 111.8 males.

The median income for a household in the town was $27,857, and the median income for a family was $28,750. Males had a median income of $23,333 versus $18,438 for females. The per capita income for the town was $13,514. About 15.4% of families and 16.8% of the population were below the poverty line, including 26.0% of those under 18 and 15.1% of those 65 or over.
