= Wilkinson, Wisconsin =

- Town
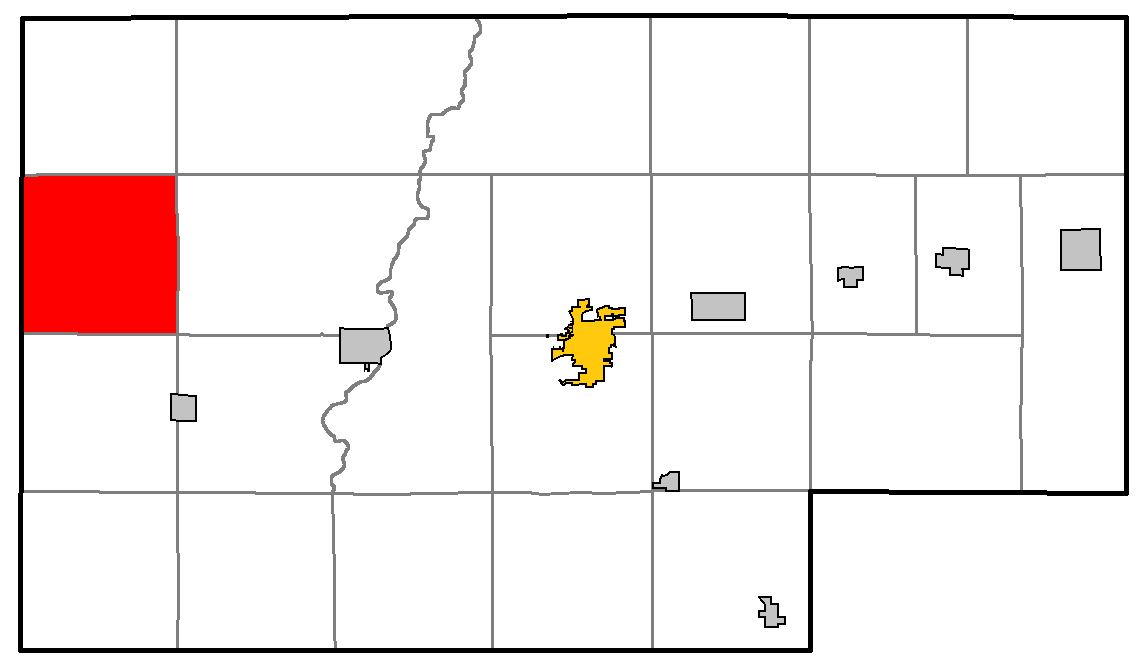
- Location of Wilkinson, within Rusk County

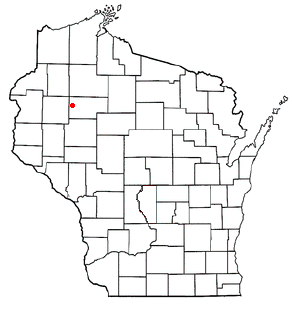
- Location of Wilkinson, Wisconsin
- Coordinates: 45°31′49″N 91°27′35″W
- Country: United States
- State: Wisconsin
- County: Rusk

Area
  - Total: 35.4 sq mi (91.7 km^{2})
  - Land: 35.1 sq mi (91.0 km^{2})
  - Water: 0.23 sq mi (0.6 km^{2})
- Elevation: 1,578 ft (481 m)

Population (2020)
  - Total: 51
  - Density: 1.5/sq mi (0.56/km^{2})
- Time zone: UTC-6 (Central (CST))
  - Summer (DST): UTC-5 (CDT)
- Area codes: 715 & 534
- FIPS code: 55-87125
- GNIS feature ID: 1584437

Wilkinson is a town in Rusk County, Wisconsin, United States. The population was 51 at the 2020 census.

== Geography ==
According to the United States Census Bureau, the town has a total area of 35.4 square miles (91.7 km^{2}), of which 35.2 square miles (91.0 km^{2}) is land and 0.2 square mile (0.6 km^{2}) (0.71%) is water.

== Demographics ==
As of the census of 2000, there were sixty six people, twenty four households, and fifteen families residing in the town. The population density was 1.9 people per square mile (0.7/km^{2}). There were 36 housing units at an average density of 1.0 per square mile (0.4/km^{2}). The racial makeup of the town was 96.97% White and 3.03% African American.

There were 24 households, out of which 33.3% had children under the age of 18 living with them, 54.2% were married couples living together, 4.2% had a female householder with no husband present, and 37.5% were non-families. 29.2% of all households were made up of individuals, and 8.3% had someone living alone who was 65 years of age or older. The average household size was 2.75 and the average family size was 3.47.

In the town, the population was spread out, with 34.8% under the age of 18, 3.0% from 18 to 24, 27.3% from 25 to 44, 28.8% from 45 to 64, and 6.1% who were 65 years of age or older. The median age was 33 years. For every 100 females, there were 112.9 males. For every 100 females age 18 and over, there were 152.9 males.

The median income for a household in the town was $26,750, and the median income for a family was $30,313. Males had a median income of $30,500 versus $17,083 for females. The per capita income for the town was $9,851. There were 30.4% of families and 37.2% of the population living below the poverty line, including 60.0% of under eighteens and none of those over 64.
