= Big Falls, Wisconsin =

Big Falls is the name of some places in the U.S. state of Wisconsin:

- Big Falls, Rusk County, Wisconsin, a town
- Big Falls, Waupaca County, Wisconsin, a village
