= Big Falls, Rusk County, Wisconsin =

Big Falls, Wisconsin
- Town
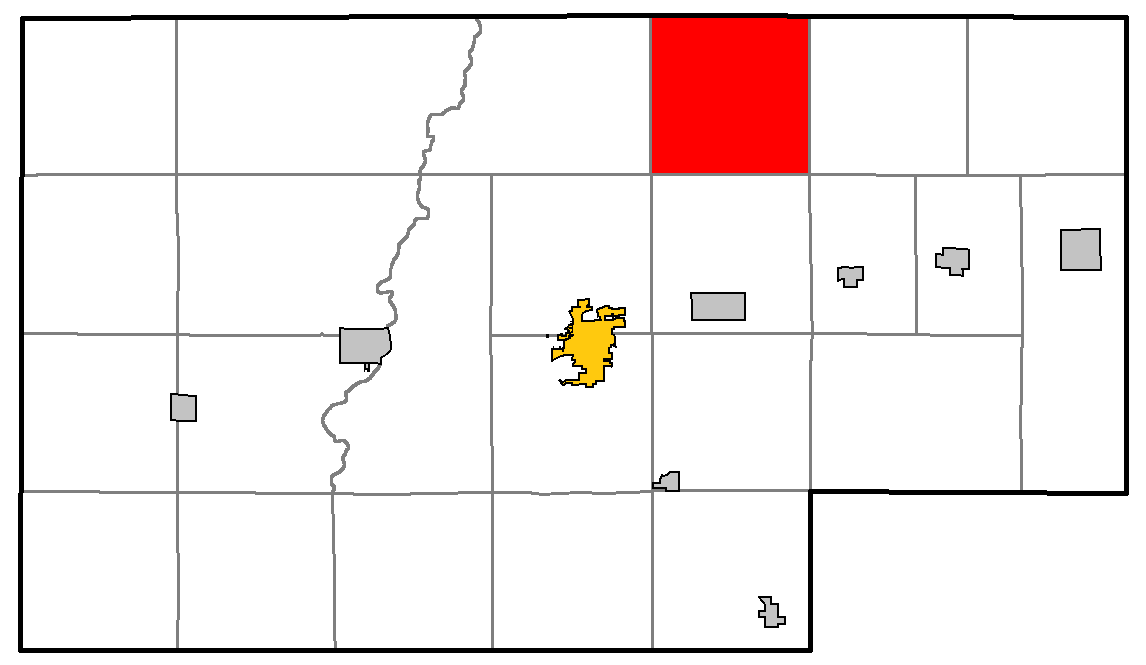
- Location of Big Falls within Rusk County

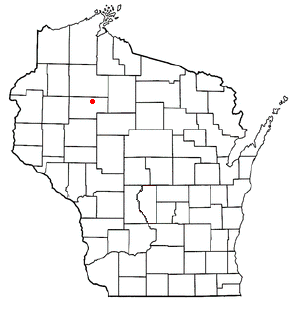
- Location of Big Falls, Rusk County, Wisconsin
- Coordinates: 45°34′46″N 90°59′6″W
- Country: United States
- State: Wisconsin
- County: Rusk

Area
  - Total: 36.0 sq mi (93.3 km^{2})
  - Land: 35.4 sq mi (91.6 km^{2})
  - Water: 0.62 sq mi (1.6 km^{2})
- Elevation: 1,270 ft (390 m)

Population (2020)
  - Total: 115
  - Density: 3.25/sq mi (1.26/km^{2})
- Time zone: UTC-6 (Central (CST))
  - Summer (DST): UTC-5 (CDT)
- Area codes: 715 & 534
- FIPS code: 55-07225
- GNIS feature ID: 1582807

Big Falls is a town in Rusk County, Wisconsin, United States. The population was 115 at the 2020 census.

== Geography ==
According to the United States Census Bureau, the town has a total area of 36.0 square miles (93.3 km^{2}), of which 35.4 square miles (91.6 km^{2}) is land and 0.6 square mile (1.6 km^{2}) (1.75%) is water.

== Demographics ==
Historical population
Census	Pop.	Note	%±
1990	107		—
2000	117		9.3%
2010	138		17.9%
2020	115		−16.7%

As of the census of 2000, there were 107 people, 43 households, and 30 families residing in the town. The population density was 3.0 people per square mile (1.2/km^{2}). There were 52 housing units at an average density of 1.5 per square mile (0.6/km^{2}). The racial makeup of the town was 100.00% White.

There were 43 households, out of which 20.9% had children under the age of 18 living with them, 60.5% were married couples living together, 9.3% had a female householder with no husband present, and 30.2% were non-families. 20.9% of all households were made up of individuals, and 4.7% had someone living alone who was 65 years of age or older. The average household size was 2.49 and the average family size was 2.83.

In the town, the population was spread out, with 19.6% under the age of 18, 5.6% from 18 to 24, 30.8% from 25 to 44, 31.8% from 45 to 64, and 12.1% who were 65 years of age or older. The median age was 42 years. For every 100 females, there were 109.8 males. For every 100 females age 18 and over, there were 115.0 males.

The median income for a household in the town was $48,125, and the median income for a family was $49,688. Males had a median income of $27,000 versus $26,563 for females. The per capita income for the town was $14,644. There were no families and 2.4% of the population living below the poverty line, including no under eighteens and none of those over 64.
