= Ingram, Wisconsin =

- Village
- Location of Ingram in Rusk County, Wisconsin.
- Coordinates: 45°30′21″N 90°48′59″W
- Country: United States
- State: Wisconsin
- County: Rusk

Area
  - Total: 0.99 sq mi (2.57 km^{2})
  - Land: 0.99 sq mi (2.57 km^{2})
  - Water: 0 sq mi (0.00 km^{2})
- Elevation: 1,293 ft (394 m)

Population (2020)
  - Total: 70
  - Density: 71/sq mi (27/km^{2})
- Time zone: UTC-6 (Central (CST))
  - Summer (DST): UTC-5 (CDT)
- Area codes: 715 & 534
- FIPS code: 55-36925
- GNIS feature ID: 1566936

Ingram is a village in Rusk County, Wisconsin, United States. The population was 70 at the 2020 census.

== Geography ==
Ingram is located at 45°30′21″N 90°48′59″W (45.505794, -90.816255).

According to the United States Census Bureau, the village has a total area of 0.99 square miles (2.56 km^{2}), all land.

Ingram is situated along U.S. Highway 8, Wisconsin Highway 73, and County Road B.

== History ==
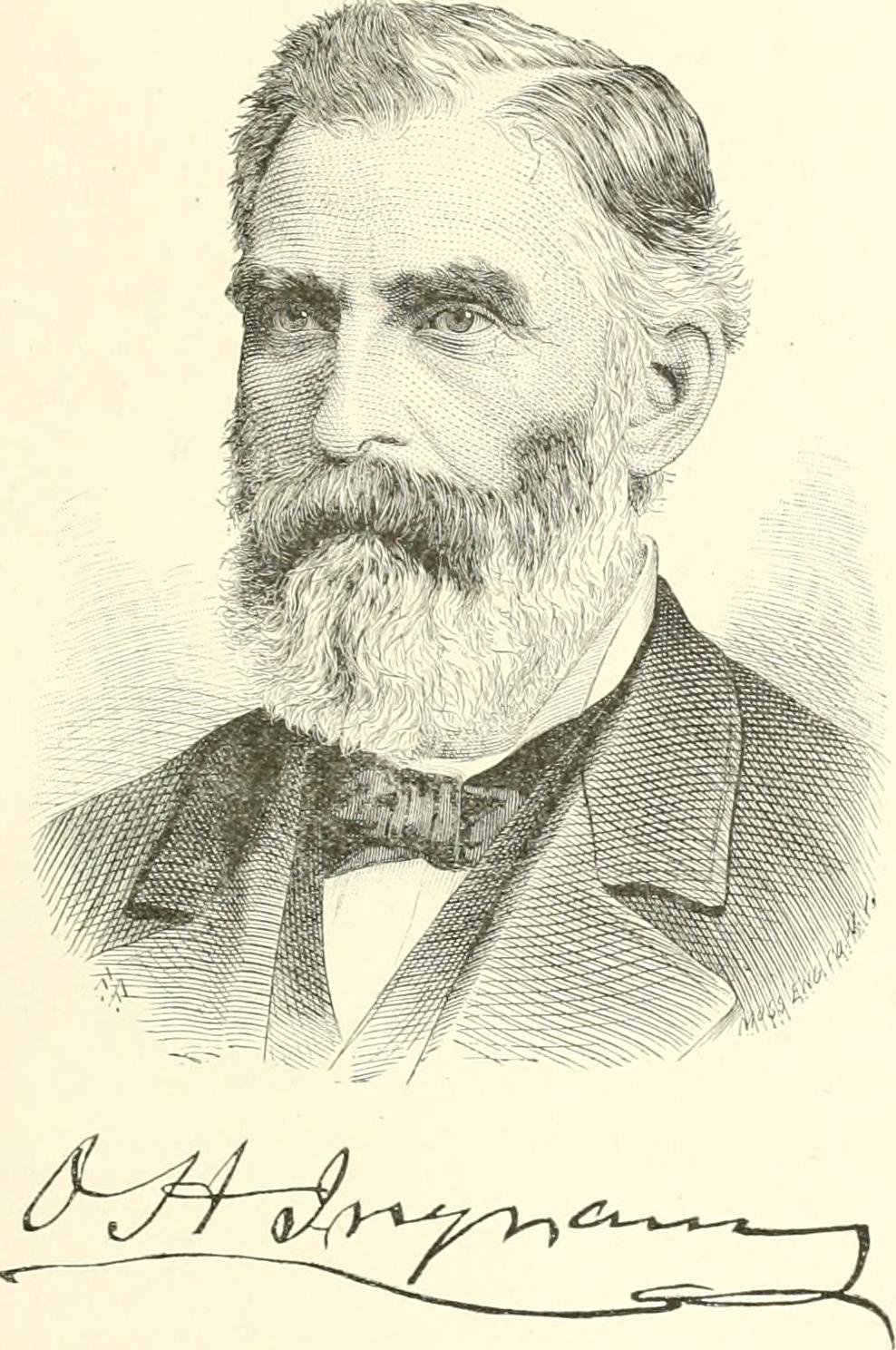
O.H. Ingram

The Minneapolis, St. Paul and Sault Ste. Marie Railroad, heading from Ladysmith toward Sault St. Marie, built through the wilderness that would become eastern Rusk County in 1884. Their early steam engines needed frequent stops along the line, so they created Ingram station six miles from Glen Flora and six from Hawkins. The station was named for Orrin Henry Ingram, an Eau Claire lumber baron.

By 1891 the newborn hamlet had grown to this description:

Ingram is on one of the tributaries of Main creek, and has a post office and a station on the railway. The population is a shifting one, while there are about fifty residents. The settlement was surveyed and platted in September, 1888. An extensive stream saw mill was built here by F. Turcot, who sold it in 1890 to the French Lumbering Company, of Chippewa Falls, and they are now operating it. It has a capacity of about 40,000 feet a day. There is also a school-house.

== Demographics ==
Historical population
Census	Pop.	Note	%±
1910	360		—
1920	124		−65.6%
1930	153		23.4%
1940	174		13.7%
1950	146		−16.1%
1960	99		−32.2%
1970	109		10.1%
1980	61		−44.0%
1990	91		49.2%
2000	76		−16.5%
2010	78		2.6%
2020	70		−10.3%
U.S. Decennial Census

=== 2010 census ===
As of the census of 2010, there were 78 people, 32 households, and 21 families living in the village. The population density was 78.8 inhabitants per square mile (30.4/km^{2}). There were 43 housing units at an average density of 43.4 per square mile (16.8/km^{2}). The racial makeup of the village was 98.7% White and 1.3% Native American.

There were 32 households, of which 37.5% had children under the age of 18 living with them, 40.6% were married couples living together, 12.5% had a female householder with no husband present, 12.5% had a male householder with no wife present, and 34.4% were non-families. 28.1% of all households were made up of individuals, and 18.8% had someone living alone who was 65 years of age or older. The average household size was 2.44 and the average family size was 3.05.

The median age in the village was 36 years. 32.1% of residents were under the age of 18; 5.1% were between the ages of 18 and 24; 23% were from 25 to 44; 19.2% were from 45 to 64; and 20.5% were 65 years of age or older. The gender makeup of the village was 48.7% male and 51.3% female.

=== 2000 census ===
At the 2000 census, there were 76 people, 32 households and 20 families living in the village. The population density was 76.6 per square mile (29.6/km^{2}). There were 38 housing units at an average density of 38.3 per square mile (14.8/km^{2}). The racial makeup of the village was 100.00% White.

There were 32 households, of which 31.3% had children under the age of 18 living with them, 50.0% were married couples living together, 9.4% had a female householder with no husband present, and 37.5% were non-families. 34.4% of all households were made up of individuals, and 21.9% had someone living alone who was 65 years of age or older. The average household size was 2.38 and the average family size was 3.10.

Age distribution was 27.6% under the age of 18, 9.2% from 18 to 24, 30.3% from 25 to 44, 18.4% from 45 to 64, and 14.5% who were 65 years of age or older. The median age was 36 years. For every 100 females, there were 100.0 males. For every 100 females age 18 and over, there were 103.7 males.

The median household income was $29,375, and the median family income was $28,750. Males had a median income of $29,375 versus $17,500 for females. The per capita income for the village was $12,868. None of the population or families were below the poverty line.
