= Weyerhaeuser, Wisconsin =

- Village
- Location of Weyerhaeuser in Rusk County, Wisconsin.
- Coordinates: 45°25′24″N 91°24′56″W
- Country: United States
- State: Wisconsin
- County: Rusk

Area
  - Total: 0.95 sq mi (2.45 km^{2})
  - Land: 0.93 sq mi (2.42 km^{2})
  - Water: 0.012 sq mi (0.03 km^{2})
- Elevation: 1,188 ft (362 m)

Population (2020)
  - Total: 232
  - Density: 248/sq mi (95.9/km^{2})
- Time zone: UTC-6 (Central (CST))
  - Summer (DST): UTC-5 (CDT)
- Area codes: 715 & 534
- FIPS code: 55-86450
- GNIS feature ID: 1584513
- Website: https://villageofweyerhaeuser.weebly.com/

Weyerhaeuser is a village in Rusk County, Wisconsin, United States. The population was 232 at the 2020 census.

== History ==
The village was named after Frederick Weyerhaeuser of the Weyerhaeuser Lumber company.

== Geography ==
Weyerhaeuser is located at 45°25′24″N 91°24′56″W (45.423201, -91.415520).

According to the United States Census Bureau, the village has a total area of 0.95 square miles (2.46 km^{2}), of which 0.94 square miles (2.43 km^{2}) is land and 0.01 square miles (0.03 km^{2}) is water.

Weyerhaeuser is along U.S. Highway 8 and County Road F.

== Demographics ==
Historical population
Census	Pop.	Note	%±
1910	371		—
1920	368		−0.8%
1930	321		−12.8%
1940	298		−7.2%
1950	331		11.1%
1960	339		2.4%
1970	285		−15.9%
1980	313		9.8%
1990	283		−9.6%
2000	353		24.7%
2010	238		−32.6%
2020	232		−2.5%
U.S. Decennial Census

=== 2010 census ===
As of the census of 2010, there were 238 people, 116 households, and 60 families living in the village. The population density was 253.2 inhabitants per square mile (97.8/km^{2}). There were 142 housing units at an average density of 151.1 per square mile (58.3/km^{2}). The racial makeup of the village was 97.9% White, 0.4% Native American, 0.8% from other races, and 0.8% from two or more races. Hispanic or Latino of any race were 1.3% of the population.

There were 116 households, of which 20.7% had children under the age of 18 living with them, 36.2% were married couples living together, 9.5% had a female householder with no husband present, 6.0% had a male householder with no wife present, and 48.3% were non-families. 42.2% of all households were made up of individuals, and 18.1% had someone living alone who was 65 years of age or older. The average household size was 2.05 and the average family size was 2.83.

The median age in the village was 48.1 years. 18.9% of residents were under the age of 18; 7.2% were between the ages of 18 and 24; 20.2% were from 25 to 44; 31.1% were from 45 to 64; and 22.7% were 65 years of age or older. The gender makeup of the village was 49.6% male and 50.4% female.

=== 2000 census ===
As of the census of 2000, there were 353 people, 172 households, and 101 families living in the village. The population density was 377.4 people per square mile (145.0/km^{2}). There were 196 housing units at an average density of 209.5 per square mile (80.5/km^{2}). The racial makeup of the village was 99.43% White, and 0.57% from two or more races. Hispanic or Latino of any race were 0.28% of the population.

There were 172 households, out of which 20.9% had children under the age of 18 living with them, 42.4% were married couples living together, 11.6% had a female householder with no husband present, and 40.7% were non-families. 37.8% of all households were made up of individuals, and 25.6% had someone living alone who was 65 years of age or older. The average household size was 2.05 and the average family size was 2.67.

In the village, the population was spread out, with 20.4% under the age of 18, 5.4% from 18 to 24, 25.8% from 25 to 44, 19.8% from 45 to 64, and 28.6% who were 65 years of age or older. The median age was 44 years. For every 100 females, there were 81.0 males. For every 100 females age 18 and over, there were 83.7 males.

The median income for a household in the village was $26,250, and the median income for a family was $30,000. Males had a median income of $29,375 versus $18,438 for females. The per capita income for the village was $13,816. About 4.9% of families and 14.1% of the population were below the poverty line, including 24.7% of those under age 18 and 9.9% of those age 65 or over.
