= Rusk, Rusk County, Wisconsin =

Rusk, Wisconsin
- Town
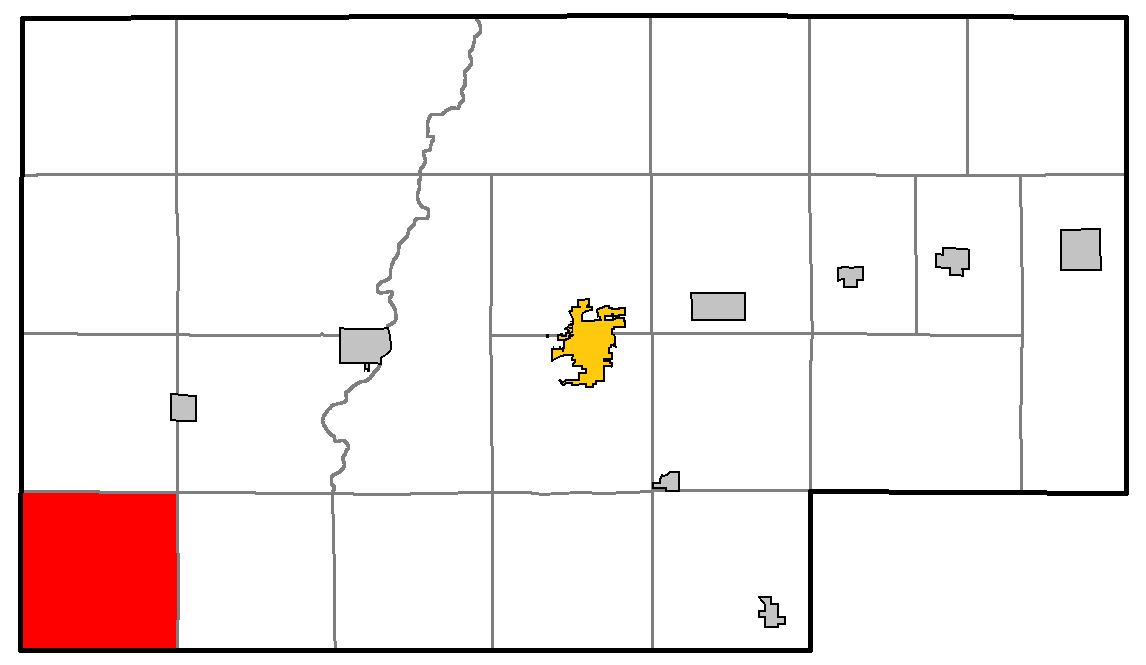
- Location of Rusk, within Rusk County

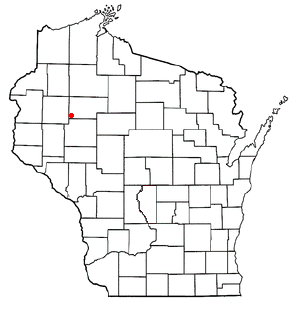
- Location of Rusk, Rusk County, Wisconsin
- Coordinates: 45°20′12″N 91°27′59″W
- Country: United States
- State: Wisconsin
- County: Rusk

Area
  - Total: 35.9 sq mi (92.9 km^{2})
  - Land: 33.5 sq mi (86.8 km^{2})
  - Water: 2.4 sq mi (6.1 km^{2})
- Elevation: 1,253 ft (382 m)

Population (2020)
  - Total: 551
  - Density: 16.4/sq mi (6.35/km^{2})
- Time zone: UTC-6 (Central (CST))
  - Summer (DST): UTC-5 (CDT)
- Area codes: 715 & 534
- FIPS code: 55-70275
- GNIS feature ID: 1584079
- Website: https://townofrusk.com/

Rusk is a town in Rusk County, Wisconsin, United States. The population was 551 at the 2020 census. The unincorporated community of Bear Lake is located in the town.

== Geography ==
According to the United States Census Bureau, the town has a total area of 35.9 square miles (92.9 km^{2}), of which, 33.5 square miles (86.8 km^{2}) of it is land and 2.3 square miles (6.1 km^{2}) of it (6.53%) is water.

== Demographics ==
As of the census of 2000, there were 475 people, 204 households, and 150 families residing in the town. The population density was 14.2 people per square mile (5.5/km^{2}). There were 435 housing units at an average density of 13.0 per square mile (5.0/km^{2}). The racial makeup of the town was 98.95% White, 0.21% from other races, and 0.84% from two or more races. Hispanic or Latino of any race were 1.47% of the population.

There were 204 households, out of which 22.5% had children under the age of 18 living with them, 65.7% were married couples living together, 4.4% had a female householder with no husband present, and 26.0% were non-families. 22.1% of all households were made up of individuals, and 9.3% had someone living alone who was 65 years of age or older. The average household size was 2.33 and the average family size was 2.72.

In the town, the population was spread out, with 20.8% under the age of 18, 3.4% from 18 to 24, 22.5% from 25 to 44, 34.3% from 45 to 64, and 18.9% who were 65 years of age or older. The median age was 47 years. For every 100 females, there were 111.1 males. For every 100 females age 18 and over, there were 111.2 males.

The median income for a household in the town was $29,904, and the median income for a family was $33,000. Males had a median income of $26,250 versus $25,221 for females. The per capita income for the town was $16,117. About 7.8% of families and 11.5% of the population were below the poverty line, including 21.4% of those under age 18 and 5.0% of those age 65 or over.
