= Conrath, Wisconsin =

- Village
- Location of Conrath in Rusk County, Wisconsin.
- Coordinates: 45°23′5″N 91°2′9″W
- Country: United States
- State: Wisconsin
- County: Rusk

Area
  - Total: 0.52 sq mi (1.35 km^{2})
  - Land: 0.52 sq mi (1.35 km^{2})
  - Water: 0 sq mi (0.00 km^{2})
- Elevation: 1,135 ft (346 m)

Population (2020)
  - Total: 88
  - Density: 170/sq mi (65/km^{2})
- Time zone: UTC-6 (Central (CST))
  - Summer (DST): UTC-5 (CDT)
- Area codes: 715 & 534
- FIPS code: 55-16775
- GNIS feature ID: 1563330

Conrath is a village in Rusk County, Wisconsin, United States. The population was 88 at the 2020 census.

== History ==
Founded as Main Creek, as Main Creek flows through the community, the village was renamed as Conrath. Conrath was "[n]amed for Frank and Charles Conrath, loggers who settled here."

== Geography ==
Conrath is located at 45°23′5″N 91°2′9″W (45.384671, -91.035961).

According to the United States Census Bureau, the village has a total area of 0.50 square miles (1.29 km^{2}), all land.

Conrath is along County Roads G and I.

== Demographics ==
Historical population
Census	Pop.	Note	%±
1920	145		—
1930	97		−33.1%
1940	128		32.0%
1950	114		−10.9%
1960	121		6.1%
1970	114		−5.8%
1980	86		−24.6%
1990	92		7.0%
2000	98		6.5%
2010	95		−3.1%
2020	88		−7.4%
U.S. Decennial Census

=== 2010 census ===
As of the census of 2010, there were 95 people, 42 households, and 22 families living in the village. The population density was 190.0 inhabitants per square mile (73.4/km^{2}). There were 48 housing units at an average density of 96.0 per square mile (37.1/km^{2}). The racial makeup of the village was 90.5% White and 9.5% African American.

There were 42 households, of which 31.0% had children under the age of 18 living with them, 33.3% were married couples living together, 7.1% had a female householder with no husband present, 11.9% had a male householder with no wife present, and 47.6% were non-families. 45.2% of all households were made up of individuals, and 21.4% had someone living alone who was 65 years of age or older. The average household size was 2.26 and the average family size was 3.23.

The median age in the village was 45.9 years. 24.2% of residents were under the age of 18; 12.7% were between the ages of 18 and 24; 9.5% were from 25 to 44; 31.5% were from 45 to 64; and 22.1% were 65 years of age or older. The gender makeup of the village was 53.7% male and 46.3% female.

=== 2000 census ===
As of the census of 2000, there were 98 people, 36 households, and 24 families living in the village. The population density was 195.3 people per square mile (75.7/km^{2}). There were 39 housing units at an average density of 77.7 per square mile (30.1/km^{2}). The racial makeup of the village was 96.94% White and 3.06% Native American.

There were 36 households, out of which 38.9% had children under the age of 18 living with them, 55.6% were married couples living together, and 33.3% were non-families. 33.3% of all households were made up of individuals, and 16.7% had someone living alone who was 65 years of age or older. The average household size was 2.72 and the average family size was 3.42.

In the village, the population was spread out, with 34.7% under the age of 18, 7.1% from 18 to 24, 26.5% from 25 to 44, 16.3% from 45 to 64, and 15.3% who were 65 years of age or older. The median age was 34 years. For every 100 females, there were 113.0 males. For every 100 females age 18 and over, there were 113.3 males.

The median income for a household in the village was $30,417, and the median income for a family was $31,250. Males had a median income of $31,250 versus $22,188 for females. The per capita income for the village was $16,838. There were 25.0% of families and 29.3% of the population living below the poverty line, including 50.0% of under eighteens and none of those over 64.
