= Bruce, Wisconsin =

- Village
- Location of Bruce in Rusk County, Wisconsin.
- Coordinates: 45°27′26″N 91°16′23″W
- Country: United States
- State: Wisconsin
- County: Rusk
- Incorporated: 1901

Government
  - Type: Village

Area
  - Total: 2.36 sq mi (6.11 km^{2})
  - Land: 2.31 sq mi (5.98 km^{2})
  - Water: 0.050 sq mi (0.13 km^{2})
- Elevation: 1,106 ft (337 m)

Population (2020)
  - Total: 781
  - Estimate (2022): 775
  - Density: 305.5/sq mi (117.94/km^{2})
- Time zone: UTC-6 (Central (CST))
  - Summer (DST): UTC-5 (CDT)
- Area codes: 715 & 534
- FIPS code: 55-10500
- GNIS feature ID: 1562279
- Website: http://www.villageofbruce.org/

Bruce is a village in Rusk County, Wisconsin, United States. The population was 781 at the 2020 census. The village was founded in 1884 by the Sault Ste. Marie Land and Improvement Company. The land company was incorporated and led by the principal officers of the Minneapolis, Sault Ste. Marie and Atlantic Railway, which operated its ceremonial first train over its line to Bruce in November 1884. It was named for Alanson C. Bruce who operated a logging camp in the area.

== Geography ==
Bruce is located at 45°27′26″N 91°16′23″W (45.457203, -91.272923).

According to the United States Census Bureau, the village has a total area of 2.39 square miles (6.19 km^{2}), of which 2.34 square miles (6.06 km^{2}) is land and 0.05 square miles (0.13 km^{2}) is water.

Bruce is situated along U.S. Highway 8 and Wisconsin Highway 40.

== Demographics ==
Historical population
Census	Pop.	Note	%±
1910	565		—
1920	561		−0.7%
1930	548		−2.3%
1940	596		8.8%
1950	867		45.5%
1960	815		−6.0%
1970	799		−2.0%
1980	905		13.3%
1990	844		−6.7%
2000	787		−6.8%
2010	779		−1.0%
2020	781		0.3%
2022 (est.)	775	▼	−0.8%
U.S. Decennial Census

=== 2010 census ===
As of the census of 2010, there were 779 people, 371 households, and 203 families living in the village. The population density was 332.9 inhabitants per square mile (128.5/km^{2}). There were 419 housing units at an average density of 179.1 per square mile (69.2/km^{2}). The racial makeup of the village was 99.1% White and 0.9% from two or more races. Hispanic or Latino of any race were 1.0% of the population.

There were 371 households, of which 26.1% had children under the age of 18 living with them, 38.5% were married couples living together, 11.9% had a female householder with no husband present, 4.3% had a male householder with no wife present, and 45.3% were non-families. 41.8% of all households were made up of individuals, and 23.4% had someone living alone who was 65 years of age or older. The average household size was 2.10 and the average family size was 2.85.

The median age in the village was 45.9 years. 24.1% of residents were under the age of 18; 6.4% were between the ages of 18 and 24; 18.7% were from 25 to 44; 25.5% were from 45 to 64; and 25.4% were 65 years of age or older. The gender makeup of the village was 47.2% male and 52.8% female.

=== 2000 census ===
As of the census of 2000, there were 787 people, 384 households, and 213 families living in the village. The population density was 343.7 people per square mile (132.7/km^{2}). There were 407 housing units at an average density of 177.8 per square mile (68.6/km^{2}). The racial makeup of the village was 98.98% White, 0.25% Native American, 0.13% Asian, 0.25% from other races, and 0.38% from two or more races. Hispanic or Latino of any race were 0.25% of the population.

There were 384 households, out of which 20.1% had children under the age of 18 living with them, 43.2% were married couples living together, 9.4% had a female householder with no husband present, and 44.5% were non-families. 41.1% of all households were made up of individuals, and 24.7% had someone living alone who was 65 years of age or older. The average household size was 2.05 and the average family size was 2.73.

In the village, the population was spread out, with 21.2% under the age of 18, 6.0% from 18 to 24, 22.0% from 25 to 44, 23.5% from 45 to 64, and 27.3% who were 65 years of age or older. The median age was 46 years. For every 100 females, there were 85.6 males. For every 100 females age 18 and over, there were 81.3 males.

The median income for a household in the village was $26,250, and the median income for a family was $34,861. Males had a median income of $29,732 versus $20,917 for females. The per capita income for the village was $15,226. About 4.9% of families and 9.5% of the population were below the poverty line, including 7.0% of those under age 18 and 15.5% of those age 65 or over.

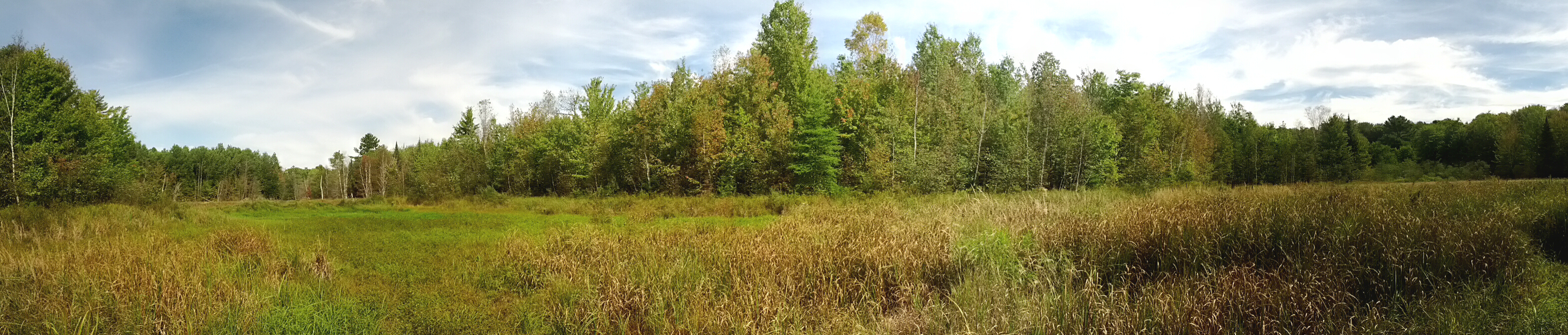
A local dried lake in the fall
