= Flambeau, Rusk County, Wisconsin =

Flambeau, Wisconsin
- Town
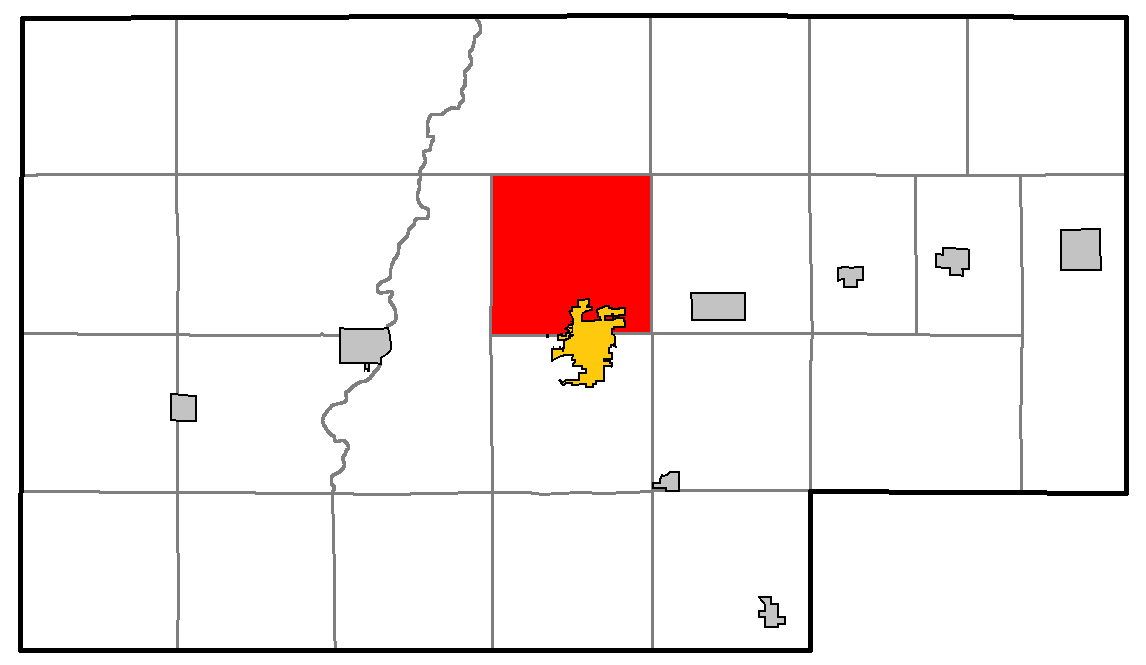
- Location of Flambeau, within Rusk County

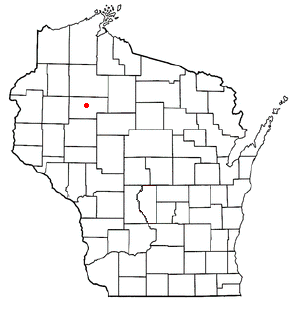
- Location of Flambeau, Rusk County, Wisconsin
- Coordinates: 45°29′24″N 91°6′19″W
- Country: United States
- State: Wisconsin
- County: Rusk

Area
  - Total: 34.9 sq mi (90.3 km^{2})
  - Land: 34.6 sq mi (89.5 km^{2})
  - Water: 0.31 sq mi (0.8 km^{2})
- Elevation: 1,184 ft (361 m)

Population (2020)
  - Total: 987
  - Density: 28.6/sq mi (11.0/km^{2})
- Time zone: UTC-6 (Central (CST))
  - Summer (DST): UTC-5 (CDT)
- Area codes: 715 & 534
- FIPS code: 55-26100
- GNIS feature ID: 1583206
- Website: https://townofflambeau.com/

Flambeau is a town in Rusk County, Wisconsin, United States. The population was 987 at the 2020 census.

== Geography ==
According to the United States Census Bureau, the town has a total area of 34.9 square miles (90.3 km^{2}), of which 34.6 square miles (89.5 km^{2}) is land and 0.3 square mile (0.8 km^{2}) (0.86%) is water.

== Demographics ==
As of the census of 2000, there were 1,067 people, 398 households, and 308 families residing in the town. The population density was 30.9 people per square mile (11.9/km^{2}). There were 438 housing units at an average density of 12.7 per square mile (4.9/km^{2}). The racial makeup of the town was 98.13% White, 0.28% African American, 0.19% Native American, 0.09% Asian, 0.47% Pacific Islander, 0.09% from other races, and 0.75% from two or more races. Hispanic or Latino of any race were 0.47% of the population.

There were 398 households, out of which 35.9% had children under the age of 18 living with them, 65.6% were married couples living together, 8.3% had a female householder with no husband present, and 22.4% were non-families. 16.6% of all households were made up of individuals, and 7.3% had someone living alone who was 65 years of age or older. The average household size was 2.68 and the average family size was 3.03.

In the town, the population was spread out, with 26.6% under the age of 18, 6.2% from 18 to 24, 31.0% from 25 to 44, 23.6% from 45 to 64, and 12.6% who were 65 years of age or older. The median age was 39 years. For every 100 females, there were 102.1 males. For every 100 females age 18 and over, there were 99.2 males.

The median income for a household in the town was $39,375, and the median income for a family was $42,596. Males had a median income of $28,646 versus $22,917 for females. The per capita income for the town was $16,418. About 3.1% of families and 4.9% of the population were below the poverty line, including 4.8% of those under age 18 and 6.1% of those age 65 or over.
