= Willard, Rusk County, Wisconsin =

Willard, Wisconsin
- Town
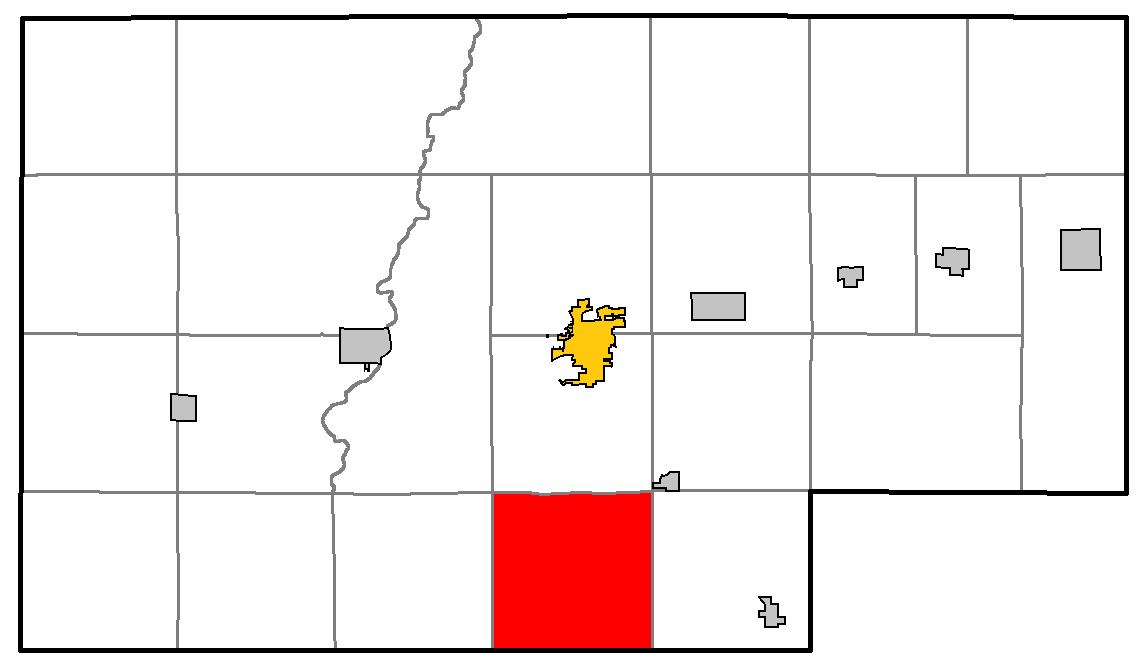
- Location of Willard, within Rusk County

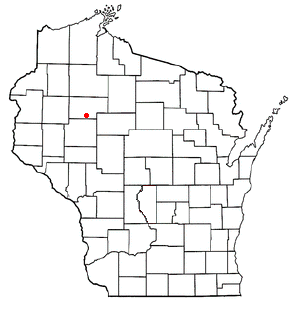
- Location of Willard, Wisconsin
- Coordinates: 45°19′3″N 91°5′22″W
- Country: United States
- State: Wisconsin
- County: Rusk

Area
  - Total: 36.1 sq mi (93.6 km^{2})
  - Land: 35.6 sq mi (92.2 km^{2})
  - Water: 0.54 sq mi (1.4 km^{2})
- Elevation: 1,142 ft (348 m)

Population (2020)
  - Total: 525
  - Density: 14.7/sq mi (5.69/km^{2})
- Time zone: UTC-6 (Central (CST))
  - Summer (DST): UTC-5 (CDT)
- Area codes: 715 & 534
- FIPS code: 55-87175
- GNIS feature ID: 1584438
- Website: https://www.willardwi.gov/

Willard is a town in Rusk County, Wisconsin, United States. The population was 525 at the 2020 census. The population estimate as of January 1, 2025 is 536. Approximately 429 of the estimated population is of voting age.

== History ==
The 48th Wisconsin Legislature created the Town of Willard on March 19, 1907.

== Etymology ==
Willard was named at the suggestion of Frank W. Tubbs (1852–1946), a livestock dealer based in Chicago who did business in Rusk County. The name refers to one of Tubbs' family members or business associates.

== Geography ==
According to the United States Census Bureau, the town has a total area of 36.2 square miles (93.6 km^{2}), of which 35.6 square miles (92.2 km^{2}) is land and 0.6 square mile (1.5 km^{2}) (1.55%) is water.

== Demographics ==
As of the census of 2000, there were 539 people, 215 households, and 150 families residing in the town. The population density was 15.1 people per square mile (5.8/km^{2}). There were 320 housing units at an average density of 9.0 per square mile (3.5/km^{2}). The racial makeup of the town was 98.52% White, 0.74% Native American, and 0.74% from two or more races. Hispanic or Latino of any race were 0.19% of the population. 27.0% were of Polish, 24.5% German, 9.4% English, 8.2% Norwegian and 5.1% Irish ancestry according to Census 2000.

There were 215 households, out of which 27.4% had children under the age of 18 living with them, 60.5% were married couples living together, 3.7% had a female householder with no husband present, and 30.2% were non-families. 24.7% of all households were made up of individuals, and 14.9% had someone living alone who was 65 years of age or older. The average household size was 2.51 and the average family size was 2.97.

In the town, the population was spread out, with 24.1% under the age of 18, 4.6% from 18 to 24, 25.0% from 25 to 44, 26.7% from 45 to 64, and 19.5% who were 65 years of age or older. The median age was 42 years. For every 100 females, there were 101.1 males. For every 100 females age 18 and over, there were 97.6 males.

The median income for a household in the town was $24,875, and the median income for a family was $30,313. Males had a median income of $25,000 versus $18,958 for females. The per capita income for the town was $12,780. About 12.1% of families and 18.2% of the population were below the poverty line, including 21.0% of those under age 18 and 21.6% of those age 65 or over.
