= Glen Flora, Wisconsin =

- Village
- Location of Glen Flora in Rusk County, Wisconsin.
- Coordinates: 45°29′48″N 90°53′35″W
- Country: United States
- State: Wisconsin
- County: Rusk

Area
  - Total: 0.56 sq mi (1.46 km^{2})
  - Land: 0.56 sq mi (1.46 km^{2})
  - Water: 0 sq mi (0.00 km^{2})
- Elevation: 1,273 ft (388 m)

Population (2020)
  - Total: 100
  - Density: 180/sq mi (68/km^{2})
- Time zone: UTC-6 (Central (CST))
  - Summer (DST): UTC-5 (CDT)
- Area codes: 715 & 534
- FIPS code: 55-29475
- GNIS feature ID: 1565559

Glen Flora is a village in Rusk County, Wisconsin, United States. The population was 100 at the 2020 census. Originally named Miller's Siding after Frank Miller, who built the first saw mill in the area in the 1880s, the village received its current name in December 1887 when the post office was established. The village is surrounded by the town of True.

== Geography ==
Glen Flora is located at 45°29′48″N 90°53′35″W (45.496729, -90.893193).

According to the United States Census Bureau, the village has a total area of 0.56 square miles (1.45 km^{2}), all land.

Glen Flora is situated along U.S. Highway 8 and County Road B.

== History ==
The Minneapolis, St. Paul and Sault Ste. Marie Railroad, heading from Ladysmith toward Sault St. Marie, built through the wilderness that would become eastern Rusk County in 1884. Their early steam engines needed frequent stops along the line, so they created Glen Flora station about midway between Deertail (Tony) and Ingram.

In 1891 an album of the Chippewa Valley described the new hamlet like this:

Glen Flora is a lumber settlements, with about thirty residents, on the [Soo Line], and on Duncan creek. It has been surveyed and platted, and has a post-office, and a steam saw, planing and shingle-mill, belonging to the Glen Flora Manufacturing company, which is operated by them.

== Demographics ==
Historical population
Census	Pop.	Note	%±
1920	174		—
1930	137		−21.3%
1940	140		2.2%
1950	91		−35.0%
1960	75		−17.6%
1970	69		−8.0%
1980	83		20.3%
1990	108		30.1%
2000	93		−13.9%
2010	92		−1.1%
2020	100		8.7%
U.S. Decennial Census

=== 2010 census ===
As of the census of 2010, there were 92 people, 41 households, and 22 families living in the village. The population density was 164.3 inhabitants per square mile (63.4/km^{2}). There were 47 housing units at an average density of 83.9 per square mile (32.4/km^{2}). The racial makeup of the village was 98.9% White and 1.1% Pacific Islander.

There were 41 households, of which 22.0% had children under the age of 18 living with them, 36.6% were married couples living together, 12.2% had a female householder with no husband present, 4.9% had a male householder with no wife present, and 46.3% were non-families. 43.9% of all households were made up of individuals, and 14.6% had someone living alone who was 65 years of age or older. The average household size was 2.17 and the average family size was 2.91.

The median age in the village was 36.8 years. 22.8% of residents were under the age of 18; 8.6% were between the ages of 18 and 24; 28.2% were from 25 to 44; 25% were from 45 to 64; and 15.2% were 65 years of age or older. The gender makeup of the village was 48.9% male and 51.1% female.

=== 2000 census ===
As of the census of 2000, there were 93 people, 44 households, and 23 families living in the village. The population density was 164.7 people per square mile (64.1/km^{2}). There were 47 housing units at an average density of 83.2 per square mile (32.4/km^{2}). The racial makeup of the village was 95.70% White, 1.08% Pacific Islander, and 3.23% from two or more races.

There were 44 households, out of which 15.9% had children under the age of 18 living with them, 38.6% were married couples living together, 13.6% had a female householder with no husband present, and 47.7% were non-families. 43.2% of all households were made up of individuals, and 29.5% had someone living alone who was 65 years of age or older. The average household size was 2.11 and the average family size was 2.96.

In the village, the population was spread out, with 20.4% under the age of 18, 11.8% from 18 to 24, 22.6% from 25 to 44, 23.7% from 45 to 64, and 21.5% who were 65 years of age or older. The median age was 43 years. For every 100 females, there were 93.8 males. For every 100 females age 18 and over, there were 85.0 males.

The median income for a household in the village was $20,250, and the median income for a family was $36,667. Males had a median income of $21,250 versus $65,417 for females. The per capita income for the village was $14,280. There were 16.7% of families and 16.9% of the population living below the poverty line, including 40.0% of under eighteens and 30.8% of those over 64.

== Notable people ==
- James W. Edming, businessman and politician, lived in Glen Flora.
