= Rusk County, Wisconsin =

County in Wisconsin, United States

- County
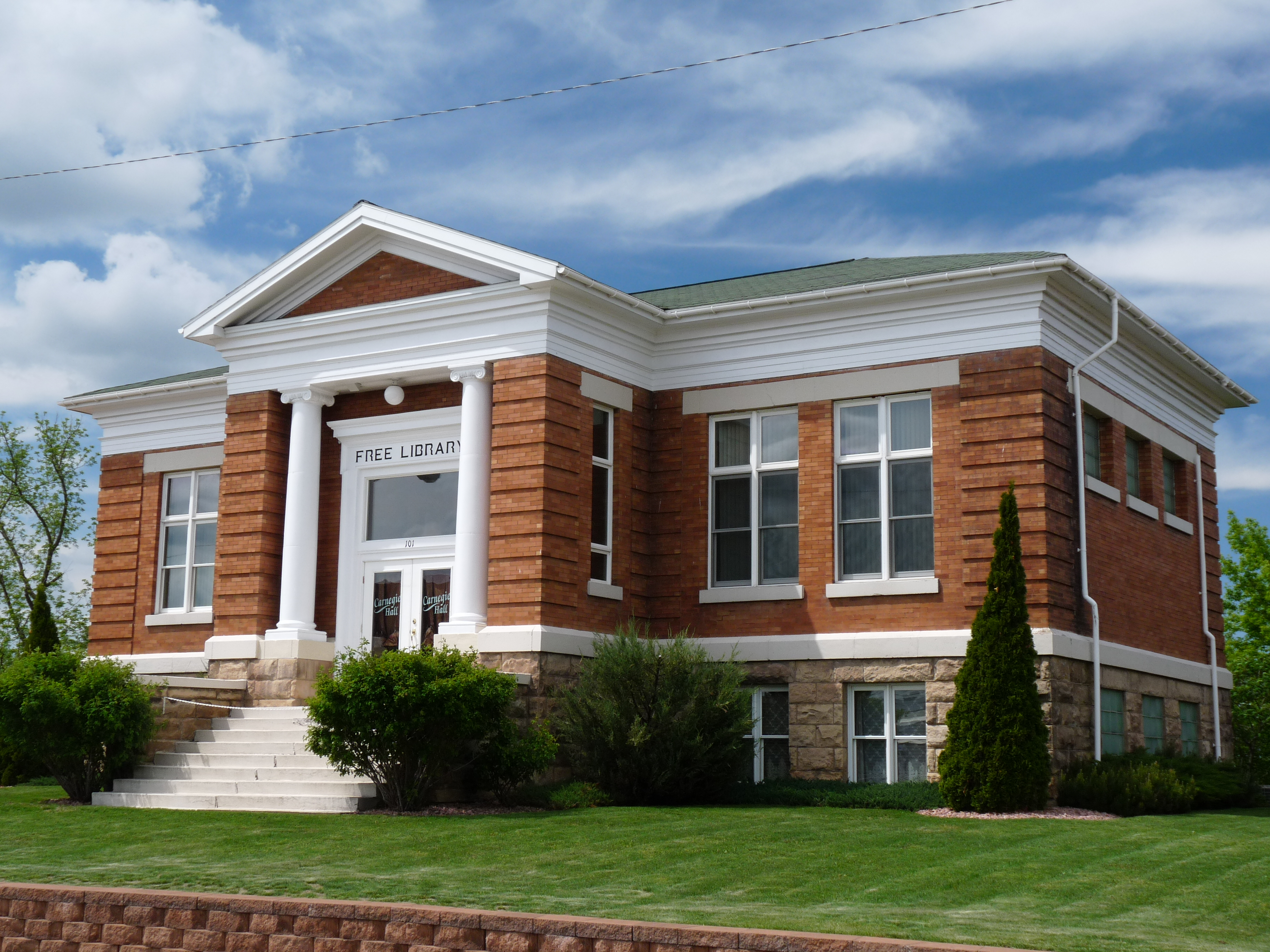
- Ladysmith Carnegie Library, designed by Claude and Starck. It is now operated as a bed and breakfast inn.

- Location within the U.S. state of Wisconsin
- Coordinates: 45°29′N 91°08′W
- Country: United States
- State: Wisconsin
- Founded: 1901
- Named for: Jeremiah McLain Rusk
- Seat: Ladysmith
- Largest city: Ladysmith

Area
  - Total: 931 sq mi (2,410 km^{2})
  - Land: 914 sq mi (2,370 km^{2})
  - Water: 17 sq mi (44 km^{2}) 1.9%

Population (2020)
  - Total: 14,188
  - Estimate (2025): 14,146 ▼
  - Density: 15.5/sq mi (6.0/km^{2})
- Time zone: UTC−6 (Central)
  - Summer (DST): UTC−5 (CDT)
- Congressional district: 7th
- Website: www.ruskcounty.org

Rusk County is a county in the U.S. state of Wisconsin. As of the 2020 census, the population was 14,188. Its county seat is Ladysmith. The Chippewa and Flambeau rivers and their tributaries flow through the county. The land ranges from corn/soybean farms and dairy farms to lakes rimmed with vacation homes to hiking trails through the Blue Hills.

== History ==
The forested wilderness that would become Rusk County was home to different Indian nations over the years. Some used the rivers to pass through, some camped, some buried their dead there. In 1767, English explorer Jonathan Carver was the first recorded European to visit what would become Rusk County, ascending the Chippewa River on his way from the Mississippi to Lac Courte Oreilles and Lake Superior. In 1790 Lakota warriors came up the Chippewa to attack the Ojibwe, but they were defeated, leaving the Ojibwe in control through the fur trade era.

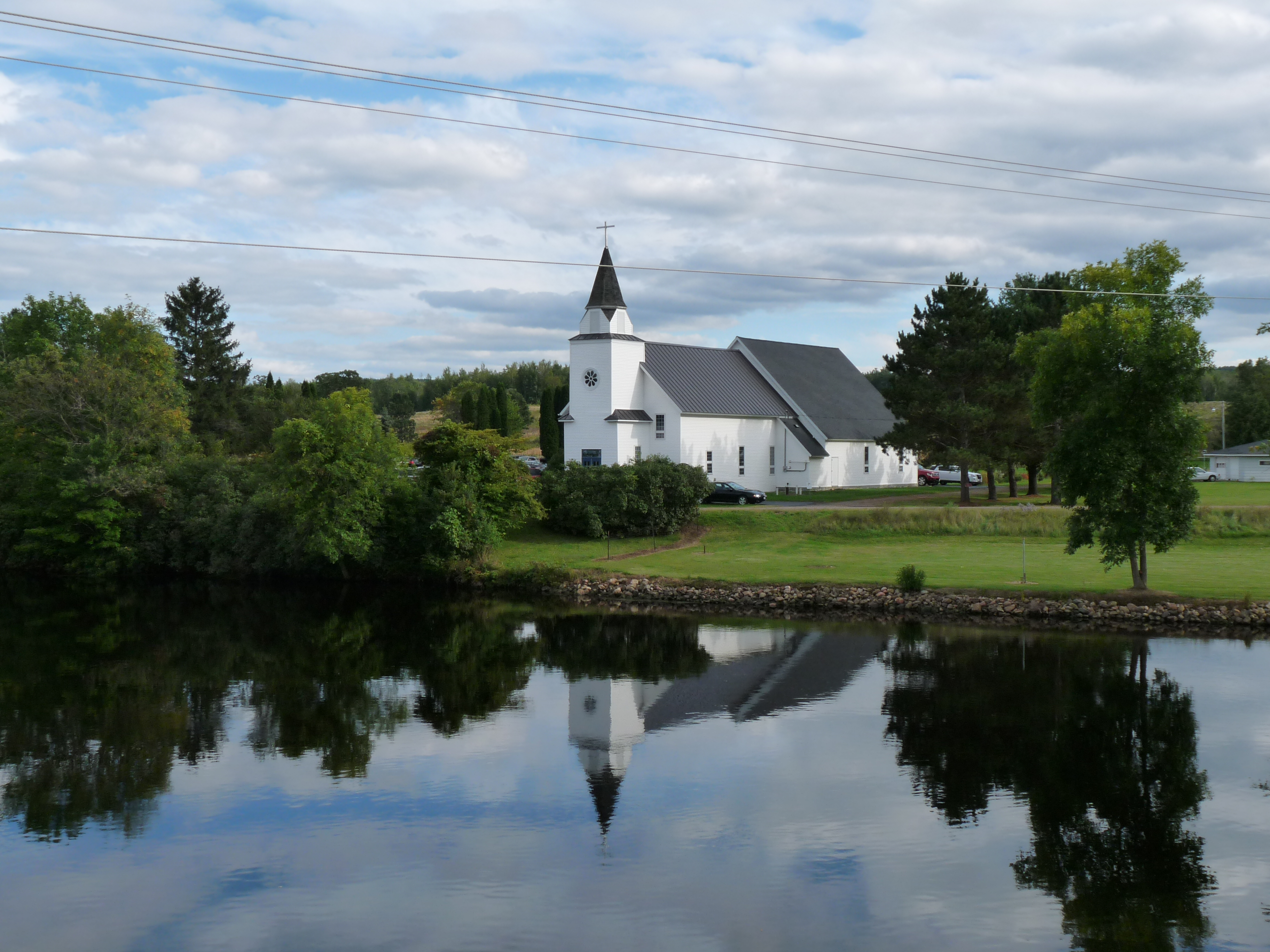
The Flambeau Mission Church, the first church in the county, was built around 1884. It served the Ojibwe, loggers and settlers.

The first loggers and settlers came up the Chippewa River from the south, entering what would become Rusk County north of modern Holcombe, where the Flambeau River joins the Chippewa. An Indian settlement lay on the bank of the Chippewa near where St. Francis of Assisi Mission Church stands.

European-American settlement began near that Indian village in 1847, when Adolph La Ronge and his wife came from Canada. By the 1860s the Daniel Shaw Lumber Company had a farm two miles west (across from modern Flater's Resort) to support their operations.

Loggers initially went up the rivers and cut the choicest pine in winter, then drove masses of logs down to sawmills in Chippewa Falls and Eau Claire on the spring and early summer floods. At first they poled supplies up the rivers in bateaux, but later cut "tote roads" to haul supplies with oxen and horses to their remote logging camps.

One of these early tote roads was the Chippewa Trail, which followed west of the Chippewa from the south end of the county to the north end near Exeland, and beyond. Another trail called "The 101 Tote Road" followed up the Flambeau River. In 1872 there was no Ladysmith, but by then the trail reached Bruno Vinette's farm on the river a mile above the future Ladysmith, and another logging outpost called Hackett's Farm 20 miles beyond, on the Flambeau north of modern Hawkins. Another tote road reached Vinette's farm from the south, through what would become the Town of Grow. By 1880 the Chippewa Trail was developed into a stage road, with a horse-drawn stage running up it one day and back down the next. Stopping places (rough inns) were located about every five miles, where lumberjacks could rest and carouse on their way to and from the camps. An 1888 map of Chippewa County shows more roads, including one to Flambeau Falls (Ladysmith).

Railroads reached the area in 1884. The Mississippi River Logging Company brought in a locomotive, cars and rails by sleigh from Bloomer to start a logging railroad. Weyerhaueser's company had tried driving logs down the streams from the Potato Lake and Soft Maple areas, but the streams proved too small, so they laid track and hauled logs to Big Bend, then rolled them into the Chippewa. As the timber in that area was cut off, this railroad, named the Chippewa River and Menomonie Railroad, shifted operations, moving its rails north of Bruce.

That same year the Minneapolis, St. Paul and Sault Ste. Marie Railroad (the Soo Line) started building its railroad across the area, aiming to connect the grain of the Twin Cities with the shipping at Sault Ste. Marie. The two railroads met west of Bruce at a place called Apollonia. In the 1890s the CR&M had shops and an engine house there and Apollonia grew to 350 people - the largest town at that time in the current bounds of Rusk County. The CR&M was notable for the huge wooden trestles it built near Star Lake and Deer Lake.

The Soo Line continued east in 1884 and 1885, creating other stations which would develop as the towns of Weyerhaeuser, Bruce, Warner (now Ladysmith), Deer Tail (now Tony), Miller's Siding (now Glen Flora), Ingram and Hawkins. This new railroad provided a way to get lumber out to markets. This was particularly helpful when logging turned from pine to hardwoods, which didn't float as well. Many of these little towns along the Soo Line had sawmills, and some of those sawmills were fed by their own little logging railroads, reaching out into the forests.

Rusk County was established in 1901 when the Wisconsin legislature split off the northern half of what had been Chippewa County into a new Gates County. It started with that name because Milwaukee land speculator (and major land-holder in the county) James L. Gates said he would donate $1000 to the new county if it was named Gates. When Gates didn't come up with the money, the state legislature renamed the county Rusk in 1905 in honor of Jeremiah M. Rusk, governor of Wisconsin and the first U.S. Secretary of Agriculture. The 1901 legislation also designated Corbett (now Ladysmith) as the county seat, which was challenged by other towns all the way to the state supreme court.

Around 1905 the Wisconsin Central Railroad built another rail line through the county, heading northwest from Chicago's direction toward Superior, and crossing the Soo Line at Ladysmith. In 1907, dedicated passenger trains began passing through. The stations along this line spawned another string of hamlets: Sheldon, Conrath, Crane and Murry.

The area's economy was evolving. The peak of pine log drives on the Chippewa had been around 1885 and they ended around 1906. Hardwood lumbering started in earnest around 1900 and peaked from 1905 to 1915, then began to decline. With the decline of timber came uncertainty about the way forward, which led to schemes for mining, large-scale ranching, and manufacturing that came to nothing. The paper mill started in Ladysmith, which did succeed. The Big Falls Dam was built around 1920 to generate electricity, and the Thornapple, Ladysmith and Port Arthur dams were converted from pulp-grinding to electricity-generating later.

All along, the lumber companies and their proxy land companies had been selling cut-over parcels to settler-farmers. The farmers grazed cattle, grew potatoes and rutabagas among the stumps, and gradually cleared the land with fire, dynamite and plows, eventually scratching out 40- and 80-acre family farms. As more land was logged, more of the county turned to farms. The sawmill towns shifted to serving surrounding farms with stores, creameries, and feed mills.

During the Great Depression, times were tough in Rusk County. Banks failed at Weyerhaeuser, Tony, Glen Flora, and Ingram. Cheese factories failed. But that was also the period when Jump River Electric, supported by the New Deal Rural Electric Administration, ran electricity to farms and homes in the country. Also during those tough times, a Civilian Conservation Corps camp was established in Rusk County. It employed many young men from Chicago and other cities, along with a few locals. The camp was started in June 1933 in the town of Murry in the Blue Hills, then moved in November to a site in Cedar Rapids north of Glen Flora. The men fought fires, built roads, supported fire towers, and planted trees. When the U.S. entered WWII, some of the CCCs enlisted or were drafted, and CCC Camp Rusk shortly disbanded.

Rusk County's first rural schools had been established at least by 1891 - the Bear Lake school opened then. Those first schools were one-room, typically with one teacher for six grades. Ladysmith had a school by 1905. Rusk County Normal School opened in Ladysmith in 1907, and by the time it closed in 1948 it had trained 719 qualified teachers. Rusk County had 125 rural schools at one time.

After the Depression, rural population declined and farms merged. Rural schools too merged, until decent roads and busing allowed them to consolidate with larger graded town schools like Weyerhaeuser and Tony; consolidation of schools was completed around 1960. The Hawkins school district joined Ladysmith in 1966, then switched to the Flambeau district in 2009.

The private Mount Senario College served the area in various forms from around 1962 to 2002.

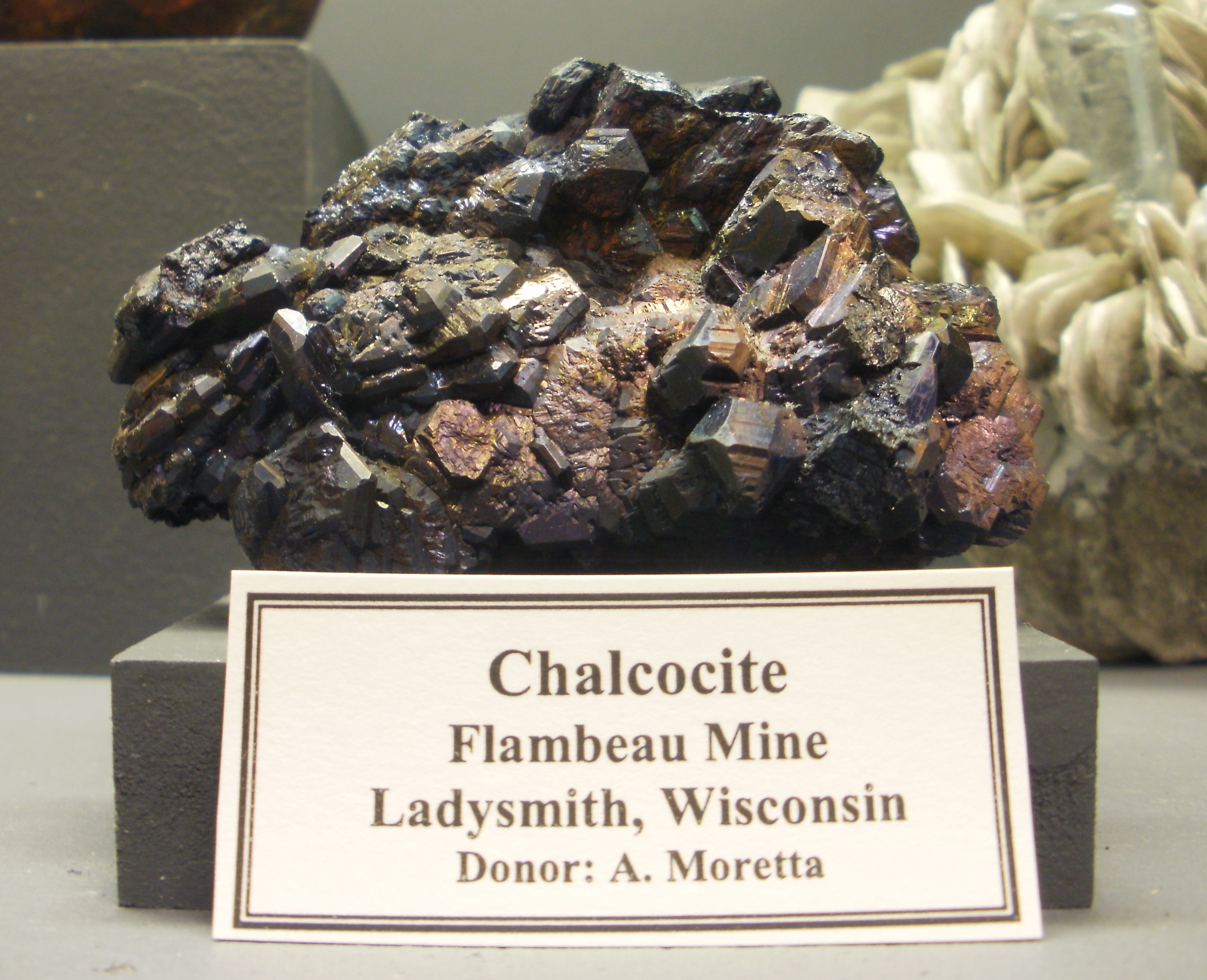

The Flambeau Mine was a controversial open pit mine near the Flambeau River a mile south of Ladysmith, which produced copper, gold and silver. In the 1970s the Kennecott mining company proposed a plan to mine there, but mining so near the Flambeau River was controversial, and that first plan was blocked by the local zoning committee. In 1987 Kennecott came back with a less risky proposal and it was approved. The mine operated from 1991 to 1999, excavating a pit 2,600 feet long and 220 feet deep, and producing 181,000 tons of copper, 334,000 ounces of gold, and 3.3 million ounces of silver. In the reclamation phase, the pit was back-filled and planted with native plants. It now offers walking trails open to the public.

Over the years, sawmills and cheese factories in the smaller towns have closed, but other industries have grown. The largest employers in the county are now Weather Shield in Ladysmith, Rusk County administration, the school districts, Wal-Mart, Artisans, the medical center in Ladysmith, and Rand Trucking.

== Geography ==
According to the U.S. Census Bureau, the county has an area of 931 square miles (2,410 km^{2}), of which 914 square miles (2,370 km^{2}) is land and 17 square miles (44 km^{2}) (1.9%) is water.

=== Adjacent counties ===
- Washburn County – northwest
- Sawyer County – north
- Price County – east
- Taylor County – southeast
- Chippewa County – south
- Barron County – west

=== Major highways ===
- U.S. Highway 8
- Highway 27 (Wisconsin)
- Highway 40 (Wisconsin)
- Highway 73 (Wisconsin)

=== Railroads ===
- Canadian National
- Watco

=== Airport ===
- KRCX – Rusk County Airport serves the county and surrounding communities.

== Demographics ==
Historical population
Census	Pop.	Note	%±
1910	11,160		—
1920	16,403		47.0%
1930	16,081		−2.0%
1940	17,737		10.3%
1950	16,790		−5.3%
1960	14,794		−11.9%
1970	14,238		−3.8%
1980	15,589		9.5%
1990	15,079		−3.3%
2000	15,347		1.8%
2010	14,755		−3.9%
2020	14,188		−3.8%
2025 (est.)	14,146	▼	−0.3%
U.S. Decennial Census; 1790–1960 1900–1990; 1990–2000 2010 2020

=== Racial and ethnic composition ===
Rusk County, Wisconsin – Racial and ethnic composition Note: the US Census treats Hispanic/Latino as an ethnic category. This table excludes Latinos from the racial categories and assigns them to a separate category. Hispanics/Latinos may be of any race.
Race / ethnicity (NH = Non-Hispanic)	Pop 1980	Pop 1990	Pop 2000	Pop 2010	Pop 2020	% 1980	% 1990	% 2000	% 2010	% 2020
White alone (NH)	15,394	14,768	14,941	14,284	13,287	98.75%	97.94%	97.35%	96.81%	93.65%
Black or African American alone (NH)	19	31	78	56	44	0.12%	0.21%	0.51%	0.38%	0.31%
Native American or Alaska Native alone (NH)	66	81	54	70	58	0.42%	0.54%	0.35%	0.47%	0.41%
Asian alone (NH)	36	113	38	41	53	0.23%	0.75%	0.25%	0.28%	0.37%
Native Hawaiian or Pacific Islander alone (NH)	x	x	14	1	5	x	x	0.09%	0.01%	0.04%
Other race alone (NH)	16	1	13	2	36	0.10%	0.01%	0.08%	0.01%	0.25%
Mixed race or Multiracial (NH)	x	x	93	128	455	x	x	0.61%	0.87%	3.21%
Hispanic or Latino (any race)	58	85	116	173	250	0.37%	0.56%	0.76%	1.17%	1.76%
Total	15,589	15,079	15,347	14,755	14,188	100.00%	100.00%	100.00%	100.00%	100.00%

=== 2020 census ===
As of the 2020 census, the county had a population of 14,188, the population density was 15.5 people per square mile (6.0 people/km^{2}), and there were 8,560 housing units at an average density of 9.4 units per square mile (3.6 units/km^{2}).

The median age was 49.8 years; 20.3% of residents were under the age of 18 and 25.9% were 65 years of age or older. For every 100 females there were 102.3 males, and for every 100 females age 18 and over there were 102.3 males age 18 and over.

There were 6,224 households in the county, of which 22.3% had children under the age of 18 living in them. Of all households, 48.5% were married-couple households, 21.2% were households with a male householder and no spouse or partner present, and 22.3% were households with a female householder and no spouse or partner present. About 32.6% of all households were made up of individuals and 16.3% had someone living alone who was 65 years of age or older.

The racial makeup of the county was 94.2% White, 0.3% Black or African American, 0.5% American Indian and Alaska Native, 0.4% Asian, <0.1% Native Hawaiian and Pacific Islander, 0.6% from some other race, and 3.9% from two or more races. Hispanic or Latino residents of any race comprised 1.8% of the population.

<0.1% of residents lived in urban areas, while 100.0% lived in rural areas.

Among the 8,560 housing units, 27.3% were vacant. Among occupied housing units, 77.0% were owner-occupied and 23.0% were renter-occupied. The homeowner vacancy rate was 1.8% and the rental vacancy rate was 10.4%.

=== 2000 census ===
2000 Census Age Pyramid for Rusk County

As of the census of 2000, there were 15,347 people, 6,095 households, and 4,156 families residing in the county. The population density was 17 people per square mile (6.6 people/km^{2}). There were 7,609 housing units at an average density of 8 units per square mile (3.1 units/km^{2}). The racial makeup of the county was 97.69% White, 0.51% Black or African American, 0.42% Native American, 0.26% Asian, 0.10% Pacific Islander, 0.35% from other races, and 0.66% from two or more races. 0.76% of the population were Hispanic or Latino of any race. 32.7% were of German, 13.6% Polish, 9.0% Norwegian, 6.8% Irish, 6.2% American and 5.6% English ancestry.

There were 6,095 households, out of which 28.60% had children under the age of 18 living with them, 55.90% were married couples living together, 7.90% had a female householder with no husband present, and 31.80% were non-families. 27.00% of all households were made up of individuals, and 14.30% had someone living alone who was 65 years of age or older. The average household size was 2.45 and the average family size was 2.97.

In the county, the population was spread out, with 24.80% under the age of 18, 7.90% from 18 to 24, 24.80% from 25 to 44, 24.10% from 45 to 64, and 18.50% who were 65 years of age or older. The median age was 40 years. For every 100 females there were 98.50 males. For every 100 females age 18 and over, there were 97.40 males.

In 2017, there were 134 births, giving a general fertility rate of 66.0 births per 1000 women aged 15–44, the 25th highest rate out of all 72 Wisconsin counties. Additionally, there were no reported induced abortions performed on women of Rusk County residence in 2017.

== Communities ==
=== City ===
- Ladysmith (county seat)

=== Villages ===
- Bruce
- Conrath
- Glen Flora
- Hawkins
- Ingram
- Sheldon
- Tony
- Weyerhaeuser

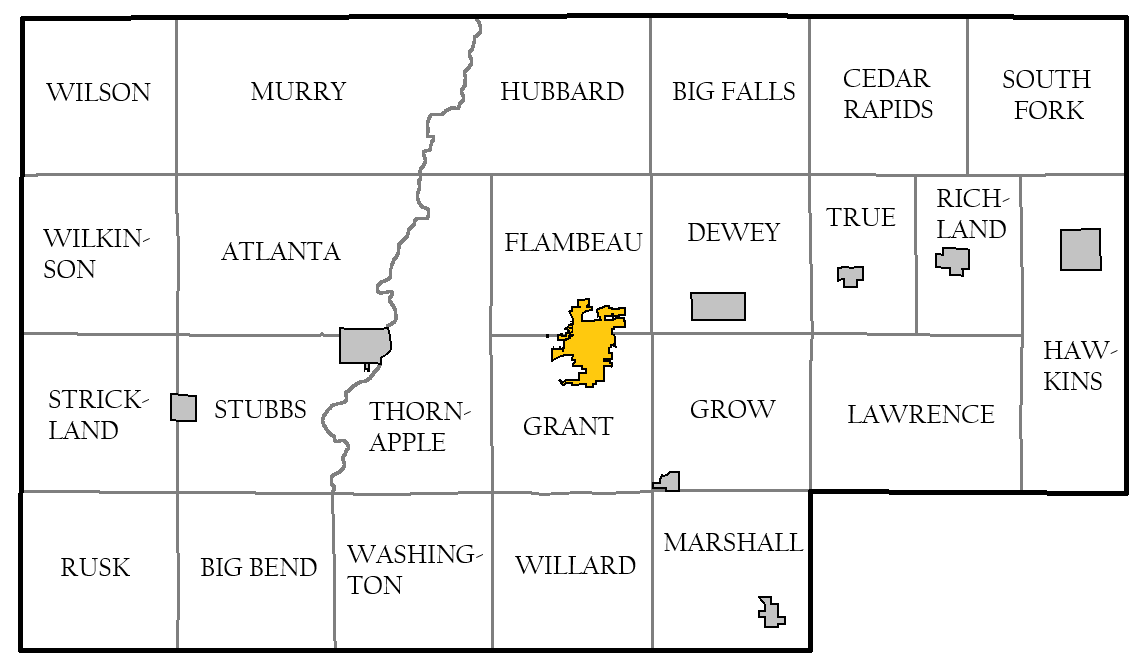
Towns of Rusk County

=== Towns ===
- Atlanta
- Big Bend
- Big Falls
- Cedar Rapids
- Dewey
- Flambeau
- Grant
- Grow
- Hawkins
- Hubbard
- Lawrence
- Marshall
- Murry
- Richland
- Rusk
- South Fork
- Strickland
- Stubbs
- Thornapple
- True
- Washington
- Wilkinson
- Willard
- Wilson

=== Unincorporated communities ===
- Apollonia
- Bear Lake
- Imalone
- Island Lake
- Murry
- Port Arthur
- South Fork
- Strickland
- Thornapple

=== Ghost towns ===
- Atlanta
- Big Bend
- Crane
- Egypt
- Horseman (Varner)
- Jerome
- Kalish
- Mandowish (Manedowish)
- Poplar / Beldonville
- Pre Bram
- Shaws Farm
- Teresita
- Tibbets
- Vallee View / Walrath
- West Ingram
- Wilson Center / Dogville (Starez)

== Politics ==
United States presidential election results for Rusk County, Wisconsin
Year	Republican		Democratic		Third party(ies)	
Year	No.	%	No.	%	No.	%
1904	1,415	81.51%	247	14.23%	74	4.26%
1908	1,431	67.82%	532	25.21%	147	6.97%
1912	575	33.78%	522	30.67%	605	35.55%
1916	989	47.59%	926	44.56%	163	7.84%
1920	2,609	77.60%	441	13.12%	312	9.28%
1924	1,932	39.11%	272	5.51%	2,736	55.38%
1928	3,524	63.62%	1,925	34.75%	90	1.62%
1932	1,942	35.90%	3,194	59.04%	274	5.06%
1936	2,453	36.18%	3,877	57.18%	450	6.64%
1940	3,484	48.66%	3,578	49.97%	98	1.37%
1944	3,092	48.40%	3,238	50.69%	58	0.91%
1948	2,623	42.04%	3,401	54.51%	215	3.45%
1952	4,134	59.36%	2,777	39.88%	53	0.76%
1956	3,433	53.68%	2,929	45.80%	33	0.52%
1960	3,094	45.48%	3,692	54.27%	17	0.25%
1964	2,214	34.57%	4,176	65.20%	15	0.23%
1968	2,666	44.74%	2,559	42.94%	734	12.32%
1972	3,007	47.89%	3,075	48.97%	197	3.14%
1976	2,724	39.15%	4,050	58.21%	183	2.63%
1980	3,704	47.52%	3,584	45.98%	507	6.50%
1984	4,061	50.90%	3,843	48.16%	75	0.94%
1988	3,063	43.73%	3,888	55.51%	53	0.76%
1992	2,430	30.50%	3,376	42.37%	2,161	27.12%
1996	2,219	33.40%	2,941	44.27%	1,483	22.32%
2000	3,758	51.02%	3,161	42.91%	447	6.07%
2004	3,985	50.27%	3,820	48.19%	122	1.54%
2008	3,253	44.73%	3,855	53.01%	164	2.26%
2012	3,676	51.12%	3,397	47.24%	118	1.64%
2016	4,564	64.39%	2,171	30.63%	353	4.98%
2020	5,257	66.66%	2,517	31.92%	112	1.42%
2024	5,660	68.44%	2,516	30.42%	94	1.14%

Between 1928 and 2008, Rusk County backed the nationwide winner on all but two occasions (1972 and 1988). In 2012, Mitt Romney defeated Barack Obama in the county by a margin of less than 4%, after Obama had won the county by more than 8% in 2008 over John McCain. Rusk County moved significantly to the right in 2016, as Donald Trump took over 64% of the county's vote and won by a margin of nearly 34%, the best margin of victory for any candidate in the county since 1920. He further increased his margin of victory to nearly 35% in 2020 while turning in the best vote share for a Republican in the county in a century at nearly 67%. Trump once again improved on his previous results in 2024, winning more than 68% of the county's vote and grew his margin of victory to over 38%, tops for a Republican in Rusk County since Warren G. Harding.

== See also ==
- National Register of Historic Places listings in Rusk County, Wisconsin
