= Area codes 715 and 534 =

Area codes in northern Wisconsin

Coordinates: 45°15′N 90°00′W

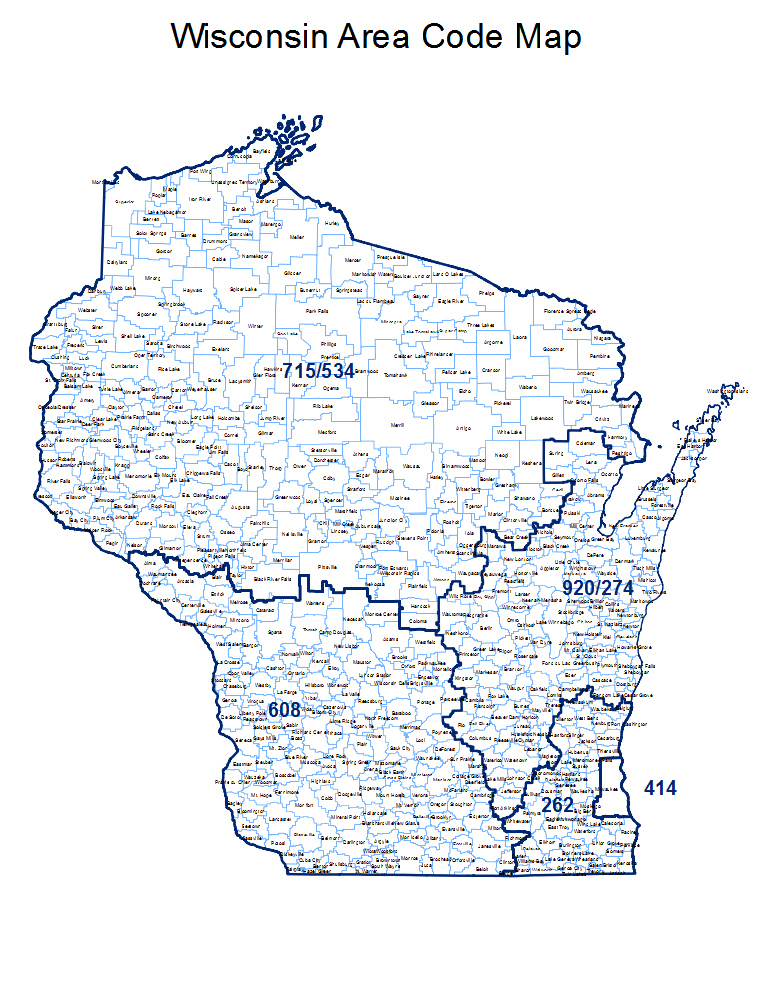
Wisconsin area codes

Area codes 715 and 534 are telephone area codes in the North American Numbering Plan (NANP) for the U.S. state of Wisconsin. The numbering plan area (NPA) comprises most of the northern part of the state. 715 was one of the original North American area codes created in 1947, while 534 was added in 2010 as an additional code for the same numbering plan area to form an overlay plan.

== History ==
In October 1947, the American Telephone and Telegraph Company (AT&T) published the first nationwide telephone numbering plan in coordination with independent telephone operators. North America was mapped into eighty-six numbering plan areas (NPAs) and each assigned a unique three-digit area code. Wisconsin was divided into two NPAs. Its northern part received area code 715, while the rest was assigned area code 414. As each NPA could initially only host about 500 central offices with 10,000 lines each, NPAs would be split over time to avoid code exhaustion or improve routing efficiency. In 1955, the southern Wisconsin NPA was split in half, with the western portion being assigned the area code 608.

The southern Wisconsin NPA was split in 1997 and 1999 to accommodate the growth in demand from proliferation of pagers, fax machines, and cell phones.

Due to northern Wisconsin's low population density, 715 was for a long time one of the few original area codes never to have been split or overlaid. But by 2010, the proliferation of cellphones and pagers had almost exhausted 715's telephone numbers. Central office code relief was implemented by adding area code 534 to form an overlay complex.

== Service area ==
=== Counties ===
Ashland, Barron, Bayfield, Buffalo, Burnett, Chippewa, Clark, Douglas, Dunn, Eau Claire, Florence, Forest, Iron, Jackson, Langlade, Lincoln, Marathon, Marinette, Menominee, Oconto, Oneida, Outagamie, Pepin, Pierce, Polk, Portage, Price, Rusk, Saint Croix, Sawyer, Shawano, Taylor, Trempealeau, Vilas, Washburn, Waupaca, Waushara, and Wood

=== Cities, towns and villages ===
Abbotsford, Alma Center, Almena, Almond, Altoona, Amberg, Amery, Amherst, Amherst Junction, Aniwa, Antigo, Arbor Vitae, Argonne, Arkansaw, Armstrong Creek, Arpin, Ashland, Athelstane, Athens, Auburndale, Augusta, Babcock, Baldwin, Balsam Lake, Bancroft, Barron, Barronett, Bay City, Bayfield, Bear Creek, Beecher, Beldenville, Benoit, Big Falls, Birchwood, Birnamwood, Black River Falls, Blenker, Bloomer, Bonduel, Boulder Junction, Bowler, Boyceville, Boyd, Brantwood, Brill, Brokaw, Bruce, Brule, Bryant, Butternut, Cable, Cadott, Cameron Caroline, Catawba, Cecil, Centuria, Chetek, Chili, Chippewa Falls, Clam Lake, Clayton, Clear Lake, Cleghorn, Clintonville, Colby, Colfax, Coloma, Comstock, Conover, Conrath, Cornell, Cornucopia, Couderay, Crandon, Crivitz, Cumberland, Curtiss, Cushing, Custer, Dallas, Danbury, Deer Park, Deerbrook, Dorchester, Downing, Downsville, Dresser, Drummond, Dunbar, Durand, Eagle River, East Ellsworth, Eau Claire, Eau Galle, Edgar, Edgewater, Eland, Elcho, Elderon, Eleva, Elk Mound, Ellsworth, Elmwood, Elton, Embarrass, Exeland, Fairchild, Fall Creek, Fence, Fifield, Florence, Foxboro, Frederic, Galloway, Gile, Gilman, Gilmanton, Gleason, Glen Flora, Glenwood City, Glidden, Goodman, Gordon, Grand View, Granton, Grantsburg, Green Valley, Greenwood, Gresham, Hager City, Hammond, Hancock, Hannibal, Harshaw, Hatley, Haugen, Hawkins, Hawthorne, Hayward, Hazelhurst, Heafford Junction, Herbster, Hertel, Hewitt, High Bridge, Hixton, Holcombe, Houlton, Hudson, Humbird, Hurley, Independence, Iola, Irma, Iron Belt, Iron River, Jim Falls, Jump River (CDP), Town of Jump River, Junction City, Kennan, Keshena, King, Knapp, Kronenwetter, La Pointe, Lac du Flambeau, Ladysmith, Lake Nebagamon, Lake Tomahawk, Lakewood, Land O' Lakes, Laona, Leopolis, Long Lake, Loyal, Lublin, Luck, Maiden Rock, Manitowish Waters, Maple, Marathon, Marengo, Marinette, Marion, Marshfield, Mason, Mattoon, McNaughton, Medford, Mellen, Menomonie, Mercer, Merrill, Merrillan, Mikana, Milladore, Millston, Milltown, Minocqua, Minong, Mondovi, Montreal, Mosinee, Mountain, Neillsville, Nekoosa, Nelson, Nelsonville, Neopit, New Auburn, New Richmond, Niagara, Odanah, Ogema, Ojibwa, Osceola, Osseo, Owen, Park Falls, Pearson, Pelican Lake, Pembine, Pepin, Peshtigo, Phelps, Phillips, Phlox, Pickerel, Pigeon Falls, Pittsville, Plainfield, Plover, Plum City, Poplar, Port Edwards, Port Wing, Porterfield, Prairie Farm, Prentice, Prescott, Presque Isle, Radisson, Rhinelander, Rib Lake, Rice Lake, Ridgeland, Ringle, River Falls, Roberts, Rock Falls, Rosholt, Rothschild, Rudolph, Saint Croix Falls, St. Germain, Sand Creek, Sarona, Saxon, Sayner, Scandinavia, Schofield, Shawano, Sheldon, Shell Lake, Siren, Solon Springs, Somerset, South Range, Spencer, Spooner, Spring Valley, Springbrook, Stanley, Star Lake, Star Prairie, Stetsonville, Stevens Point, Stockholm, Stone Lake, Stratford, Strum, Summit Lake, Superior, Taylor, Thorp, Three Lakes, Tigerton, Tilleda, Tomahawk, Tony, Townsend, Trego, Tripoli, Turtle Lake, Unity, Upson, Vesper, Wabeno, Wascott, Washburn, Waupaca, Wausau, Wausaukee, Webb Lake, Webster, Westboro, Weyerhaeuser, Wheeler, White Lake, Whitehall, Willard, Wilson, Winter, Wisconsin Rapids, Withee, Wittenberg, Woodruff, Woodville, and Zachow

== See also ==
- List of Wisconsin area codes
- List of North American Numbering Plan area codes

Wisconsin area codes: 262, 414, 608/353, 715/534, 920/274
| | North: 218, 906 | |
| West: 218, 320, 651 | 715/534 | East: 906 |
| | South: 608/353, 920/274 | |
Michigan area codes: 231, 248/947, 269, 313/679, 517, 586, 616, 734, 810, 906, 989
Minnesota area codes: 218, 320, 507/924, 612, 651, 763, 952
