= Carl M. Nelson =

American politician (1892–1962)

Carl Martin Nelson
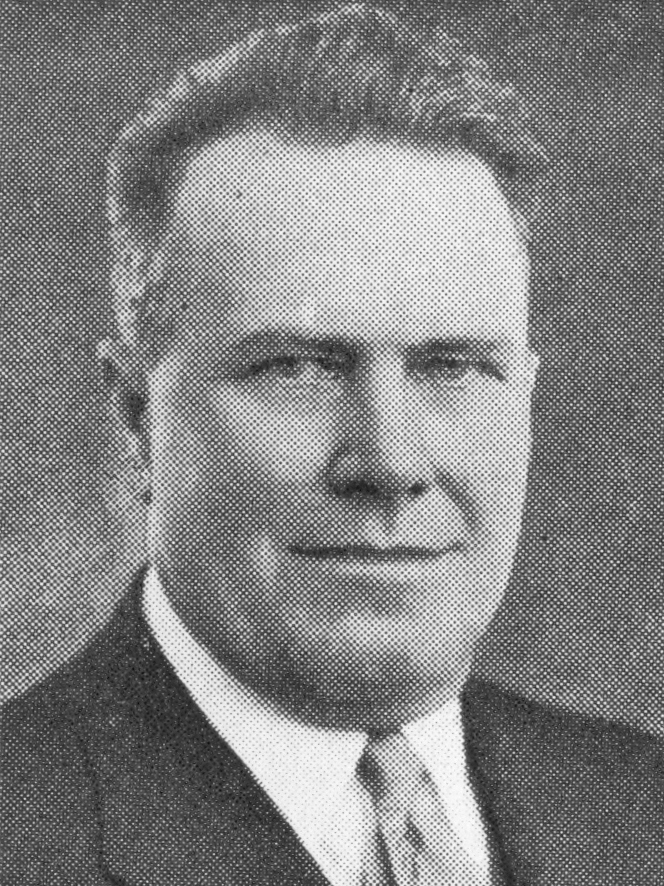
- c. 1940

Member of the Wisconsin Legislature from the district
- In office 1935–1946

Personal details
- Born: November 12, 1892 Deer Creek, Taylor County, Wisconsin
- Died: February 28, 1962 (aged 69) Wisconsin
- Party: Republican

Carl Martin Nelson (November 12, 1892 – February 28, 1962) was a member of the Wisconsin State Assembly.

== Biography ==
Nelson was born on November 12, 1892, in Deer Creek, Taylor County, Wisconsin. He attended Southern Minnesota Normal College. During World War I, he served with the United States Marine Corps in France and Belgium. He died in Wisconsin on February 28, 1962.

== Political career ==
Nelson was a member of the Assembly from 1935 to 1946. Additionally, he was chairman of Deer Creek and of Taylor County, Wisconsin. He was a Republican.
