= Anthony J. Opachen =

American politician and laborer

Anthony J. Opachen (October 18, 1909 – May 4, 1966) was an American politician and laborer.

Opachen was a laborer and candy maker born in the Town of Hammel, Taylor County, Wisconsin. He graduated from Medford High School in Medford, Wisconsin in 1927 and served as a Democrat in the Wisconsin State Assembly in 1933. Opachen was killed in a car accident in Milwaukee, Wisconsin near the downtown area, when he was 56 years old.
