= Deer Creek, Wisconsin =

Deer Creek is the name of some places in the U.S. state of Wisconsin:

- Deer Creek, Outagamie County, Wisconsin, a town
- Deer Creek, Taylor County, Wisconsin, a town
