= Maplehurst =

Maplehurst may refer to:

== Places ==
Canada

- Mansion in Thorold, Ontario.

United Kingdom

- Maplehurst, West Sussex, England

United States

- Maplehurst, Wisconsin, a town
  - Maplehurst (community), Wisconsin, an unincorporated community
- C.F. and Mary Singmaster House, near Keota, Iowa, also known as Maplehurst and as Maplehurst Ranch

== See also ==
- Maplehurst Correctional Complex, correctional facility located in Ontario, Canada
- Maplehurst Wood, Site of Special Scientific Interest located in East Sussex, England
