= Little Black, Wisconsin =

- Town
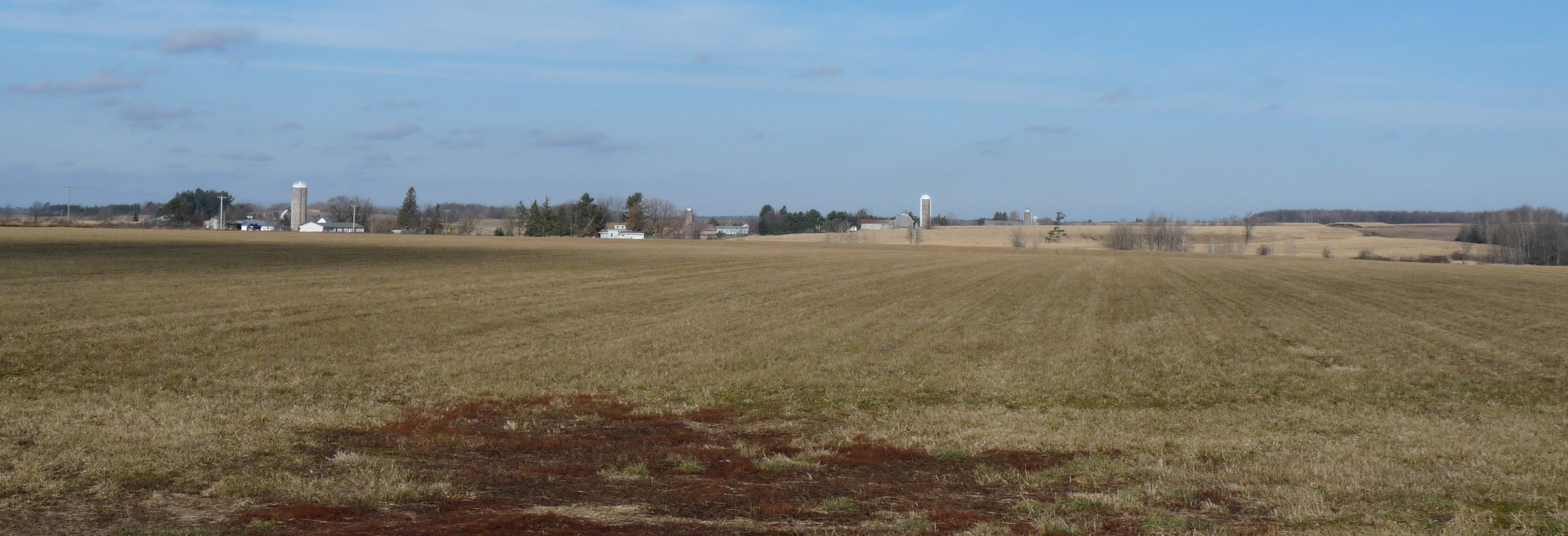

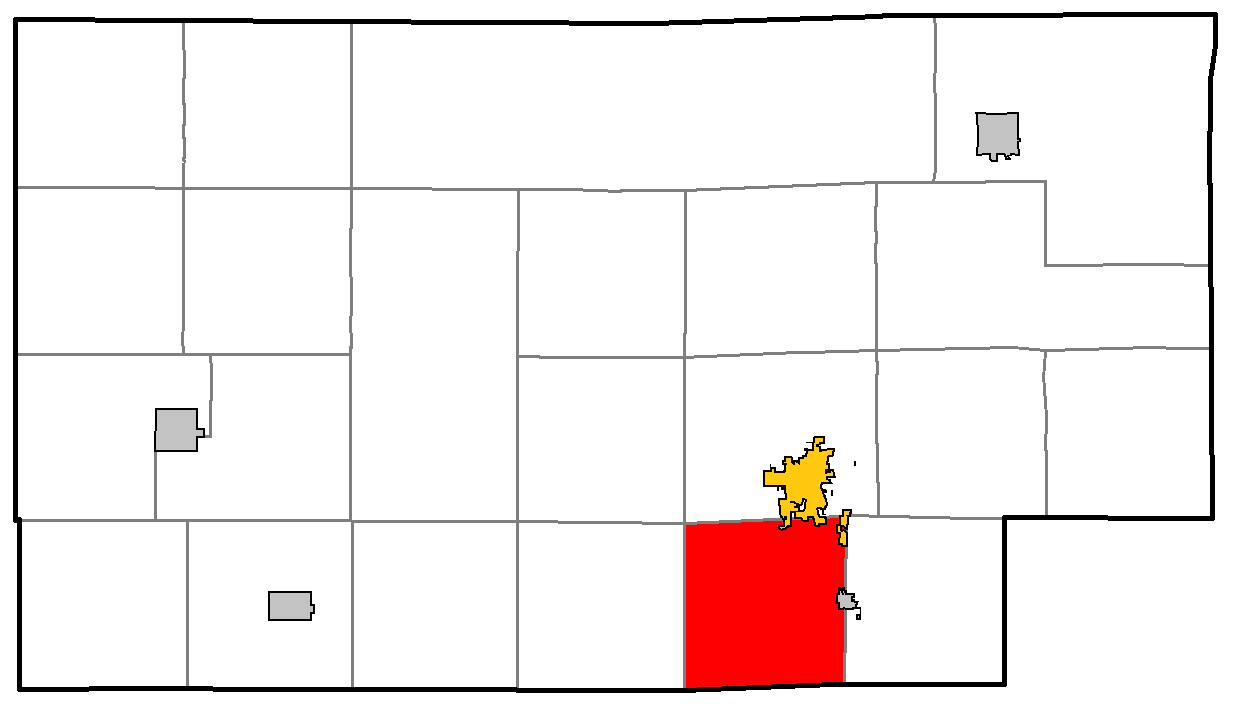
- Location of Little Black, within Taylor County

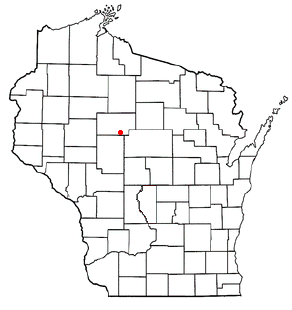
- Location of Little Black, Wisconsin
- Coordinates: 45°5′0″N 90°21′57″W
- Country: United States
- State: Wisconsin
- County: Taylor

Area
  - Total: 35.0 sq mi (90.7 km^{2})
  - Land: 35.0 sq mi (90.7 km^{2})
  - Water: 0 sq mi (0.0 km^{2})
- Elevation: 1,417 ft (432 m)

Population (2020)
  - Total: 1,156
  - Density: 33.0/sq mi (12.7/km^{2})
- Time zone: UTC-6 (Central (CST))
  - Summer (DST): UTC-5 (CDT)
- Area codes: 715 & 534
- FIPS code: 55-44900
- GNIS feature ID: 1583580
- PLSS township: T30N R1E
- Website: https://www.townoflittleblack.com/

Little Black is a town (six-mile square municipality) located in Taylor County, Wisconsin, United States. The village of Stetsonville lies partly in the town, and the hamlet of Little Black. As of the 2020 census, the town had a total population of 1,156.

== Geography ==
According to the United States Census Bureau, the town has a total area of 35.0 square miles (90.7 km^{2}), of which 35.0 square miles (90.7 km^{2}) is land and 0.03% is water. Other than the banks of streams and the Little Black River, the surface of the town is fairly level, laid down by some unknown glacier and eroded long before the last one which bulldozed the sharp Perkinstown terminal moraine to the north. The soil of the northwest half of Little Black is considered to be mostly Merrill till, and the southeastern half is Edgar till.

== History ==
The outline of the six by six mile square that would become Little Black was surveyed in 1851 by a crew working for the U.S. government. The west edge of the town is on the Fourth Principal Meridian, the first north-south line surveyed up through the forests of Wisconsin, from which towns, sections and forties were later measured. In October 1854 a different crew of surveyors marked all the section corners in the township, walking through the woods and swamps, measuring with chain and compass. When done, the deputy surveyor filed this general description:

This Township contains some Swamps, all of which are unfit for cultivation. The North West portion is mostly worthless, being almost all Swamp. The Land is generally of poor quality, and not good farming land, the soil being poor and the rocks coming to the surface in many places. Most of the Timber is Hemlock but where there is Hardwood the land is fair(?) farming land. There is no Pine of any consequence. The Township is well watered with small streams and in the North part of the Township there is a large Stream of sufficient size for milling purposes, with high banks, rocky bottom and rapid current. There are no improvements in the Township.

Around 1873 the Wisconsin Central Railroad Company built its line up through the forest on the east side of the six-mile square that would become Little Black, heading for Medford and eventually Ashland. To finance this undertaking, the railroad was granted half the land for eighteen miles on either side of the track laid - generally the odd sections. The railroad built a station at what would become Stetsonville. In 1873 a sawmill was built in the hamlet of Little Black - the first in Taylor County. One was built in Stetsonville in 1875. They were first fed by lumber cut from the surrounding country.

When Taylor County was formed in 1875, Little Black was six miles north to south same as today, but it spanned the full width of the county, including all modern towns from Taft to Deer Creek. It was named for the Little Black River. Deer Creek was split off in 1880 and other towns in subsequent years.

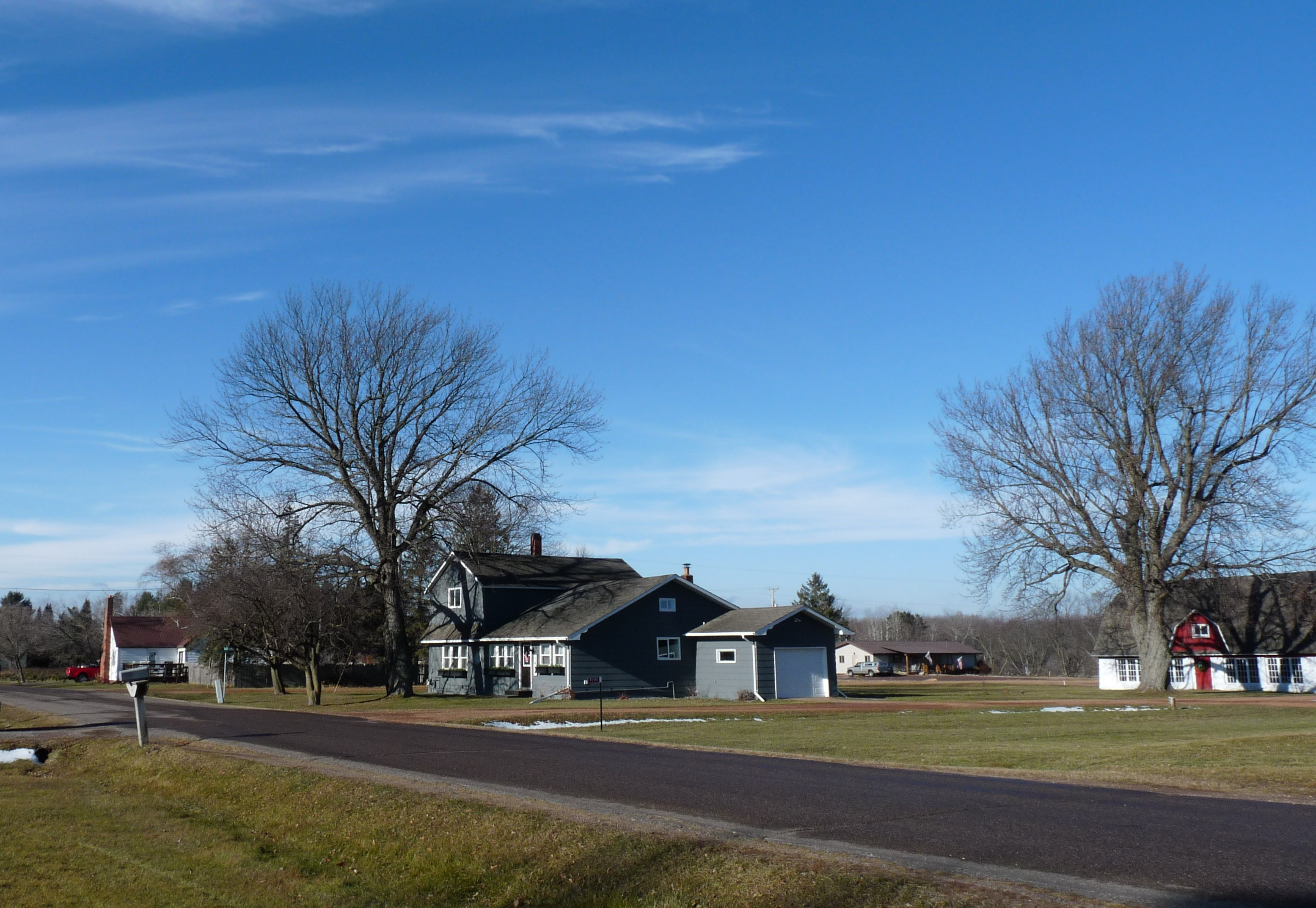
A bit of the hamlet of Little Black in 2023

A village of Little Black was platted, with most lots aligned to the compass instead of the railroad. The map shows a post office and church. As mentioned above, the first sawmill there started in 1873. A shingle mill was added in 1880. Another mill was added in 1883 where the Wisconsin Central crossed the Little Black River. This mill went through a succession of owners until it was bought by Davis and Starr of Eau Claire, then burned in 1889. Davis and Starr rebuilt it with the latest technology at the time to be one of the largest mills in the state, running night and day, employing over 200 men. Then in 1893 they shut it down.

A map from 1900 shows the town largely filled in by settlers, except for the southwest corner. The same map shows the adjacent 6-mile squares on the east and west still in large blocks owned largely by lumber companies or the Wisconsin Central, but the land near the railroad was filled in with settlers for miles. East-west wagon roads were in place every mile, except for the southwest corner. North and south, predecessors of Swallow Drive and Gibson Drive already spanned much of the town. Settlers' homesteads lined these roads, with 40 and 80 acres the most common farm sizes. The map shows sawmills at Little Black and Stetsonville, two rural schoolhouses along a predecessor of Elm Avenue, a schoolhouse west of Little Black, and another where Apple Avenue now meets Castle Drive. It shows churches in Stetsonville and Little Black.

The 1911 plat map shows thicker settlers, filling even the last southwest corner. By this time even the east-west roads were nearly complete every mile. To the previous schools, one had been added three miles west of Stetsonville. Another sawmill had been added a mile south of Stetsonville.

== Demographics ==
As of the census of 2000, there were 1,148 people, 403 households, and 321 families residing in the town. The population density was 32.8 people per square mile (12.7/km^{2}). There were 414 housing units at an average density of 11.8 per square mile (4.6/km^{2}). The racial makeup of the town was 99.04% White, 0.35% African American, 0.09% Native American, 0.09% Asian, 0.00% Pacific Islander, 0.00% from other races, and 0.44% from two or more races. 0.52% of the population were Hispanic or Latino of any race.

There were 403 households, out of which 38.7% had children under the age of 18 living with them, 65.0% were married couples living together, 7.7% had a female householder with no husband present, and 20.3% were non-families. 14.9% of all households were made up of individuals, and 5.5% had someone living alone who was 65 years of age or older. The average household size was 2.85 and the average family size was 3.16.

In the town, the population was spread out, with 30.4% under the age of 18, 6.0% from 18 to 24, 30.2% from 25 to 44, 22.7% from 45 to 64, and 10.6% who were 65 years of age or older. The median age was 36 years. For every 100 females, there were 111.8 males. For every 100 females age 18 and over, there were 114.2 males.

The median income for a household in the town was $45,000, and the median income for a family was $48,167. Males had a median income of $31,645 versus $23,281 for females. The per capita income for the town was $17,633. 8.1% of the population and 5.2% of families were below the poverty line. 9.1% of those under the age of 18 and 8.8% of those 65 and older were living below the poverty line.
