= Medford (town), Wisconsin =

Medford, Wisconsin
- Town
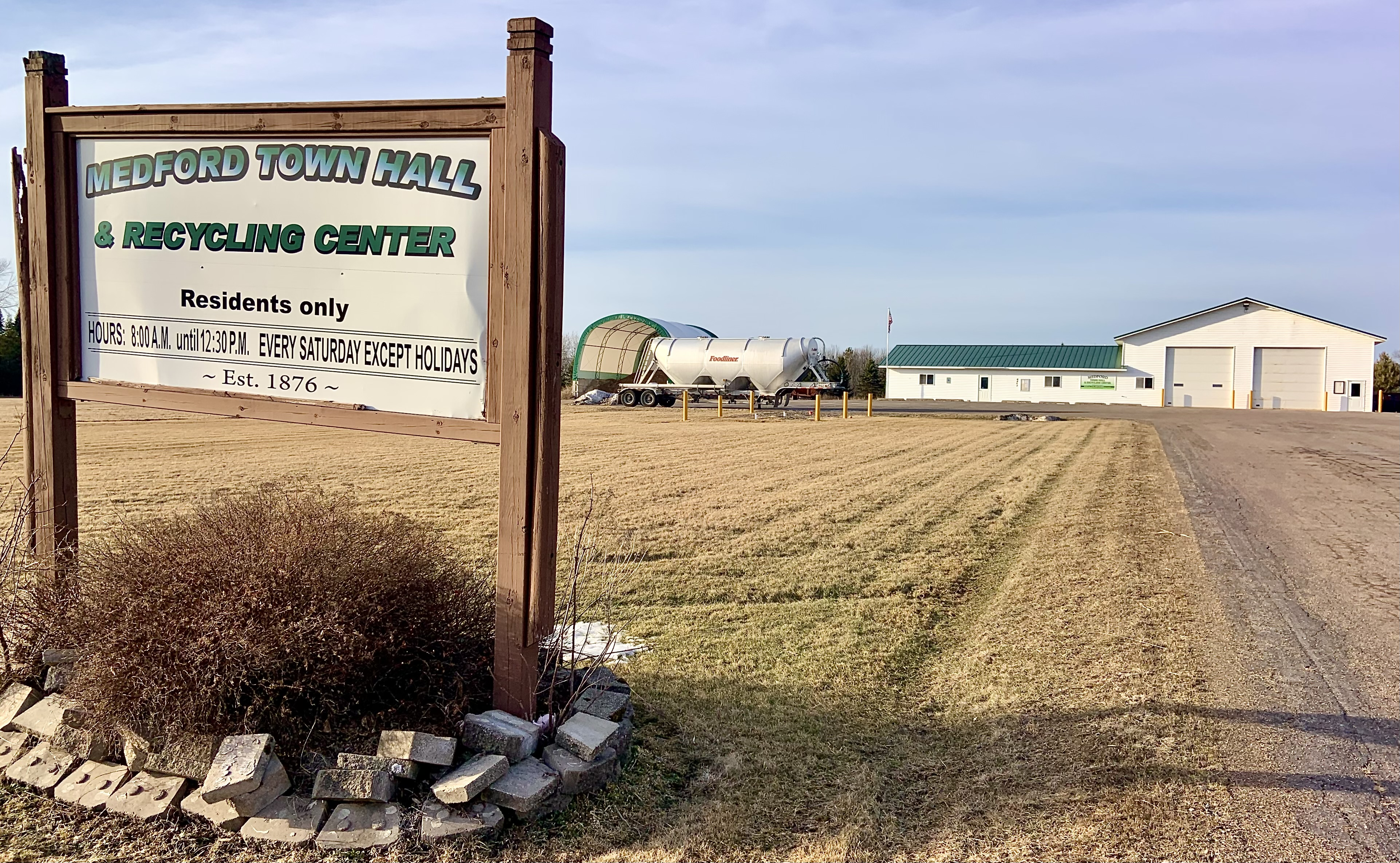
- Town hall

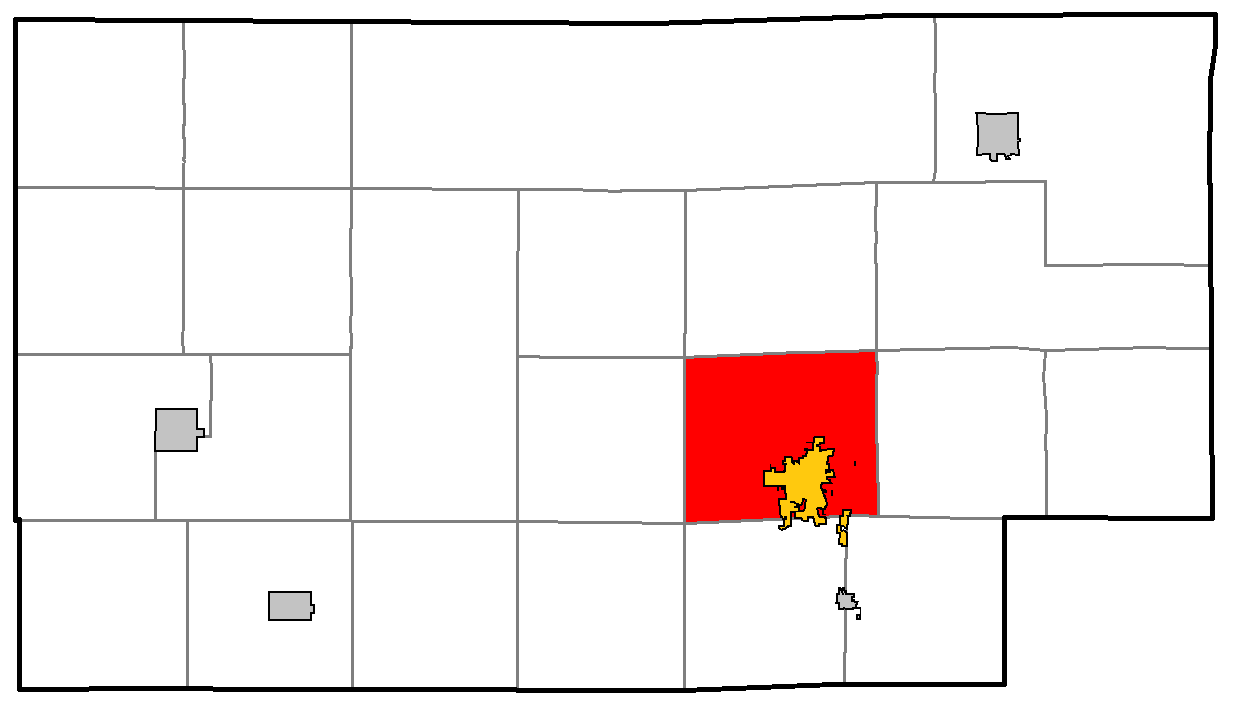
- Location of Medford, within Taylor County

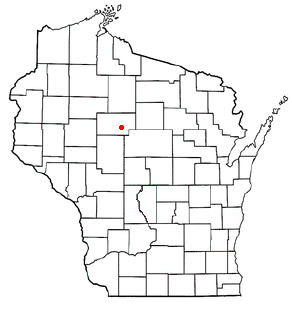
- Location of Medford (town), Wisconsin
- Coordinates: 45°9′22″N 90°22′20″W
- Country: United States
- State: Wisconsin
- County: Taylor

Area
  - Total: 37.8 sq mi (97.8 km^{2})
  - Land: 37.7 sq mi (97.6 km^{2})
  - Water: 0.077 sq mi (0.2 km^{2})
- Elevation: 1,470 ft (448 m)

Population (2020)
  - Total: 2,482
  - Density: 65.9/sq mi (25.4/km^{2})
- Time zone: UTC-6 (Central (CST))
  - Summer (DST): UTC-5 (CDT)
- Area codes: 715 & 534
- FIPS code: 55-50450
- GNIS feature ID: 1583684
- PLSS township: T31N R1E
- Website: https://www.townofmedfordwi.com/

Medford is a town (seven by six mile rural municipality) in Taylor County, Wisconsin, United States. The population was 2,482 at the 2020 census. The City of Medford lies mostly within the town boundaries.

== Geography ==
According to the United States Census Bureau, the town has a total area of 37.8 square miles (97.8 km^{2}), of which 37.7 square miles (97.6 km^{2}) is land and 0.1 square mile (0.2 km^{2}) (0.19%) is water.

== History ==
The southern edge of the six by seven mile rectangle that would become the town of Medford was first surveyed in 1851 by a crew working for the U.S. government. That west edge of the town is on the Fourth Principal Meridian, the first north-south line surveyed up through the forests of Wisconsin, from which all the towns, sections and forties are measured. In late 1861 a different crew of surveyors marked all the section corners in the township, walking through the woods and swamps, measuring with chain and compass. When done, the deputy surveyor filed this general description:

The Surface of this Township is rather(?) gently rolling or Level. Timber mostly Hemlock with (?) Birch (?) Sugar Fir(?) Spruce and White Pine. Soil 1st & 2nd Rate and of good quality for agricultural purposes. The Township is well watered by numerous(?) Small Streams which flow in a Southerly direction.

The area around Medford remained largely forest until 1873, when the Wisconsin Central Railroad cleared a roadway south to north along the Black River, and laid its track heading for Ashland. It established a station on the river and called it Medford, starting the city. To finance this undertaking, the railroad was granted half the land for eighteen miles on either side of the track laid - generally the odd sections. The railroad platted the first section of the village of Medford in 1874. At least one sawmill was built in Medford that same year, and logging expanded in the surrounding country.

When Taylor County was formed in 1875, the town of Medford was six miles north to south same as today, but it spanned the full width of the county, including all modern towns from Aurora to Goodrich.

An 1880 map of this area shows roads of some sort heading out from Medford into the surrounding country. One road follows the course of modern Highway 64 east beyond the township to the county line and west to where it now tees with modern County E. Partial predecessors of Perkins St, Oriole Ave, and Highway 13 were in place - also predecessors of Allman Ave, Center Ave, and County E on the west side.

A map from 1900 shows the town filling in. More roads were in place, with settlers' homesteads sprinkled along them. 80 and 40 acres are the most common farm sizes. Rural schools were at the corner of what would become Perkinstown Avenue and Anderson Road, two on Center Avenue, one on the future 64 west of Medford, and one at Oriole Drive and Kummer Lane. A few large parcels without settlers are still north of Medford - some in odd sections still owned by the railroad.

The 1913 plat map shows more roads, more settlers, another rural school added two miles east of Medford on what would become 64. It has "Fair Ground" marked on the east side of Medford, and a new Medford Lumber Co railroad angles northwest from Medford, then turns due west towards Perkinstown.

== Demographics ==
As of the census of 2000, there were 2,216 people, 821 households, and 637 families residing in the town. The population density was 58.8 people per square mile (22.7/km^{2}). There were 846 housing units at an average density of 22.4 per square mile (8.7/km^{2}). The racial makeup of the town was 98.24% White, 0.09% Black or African American, 0.14% Native American, 0.41% Asian, 0.27% from other races, and 0.86% from two or more races. 0.23% of the population were Hispanic or Latino of any race.

There were 821 households, out of which 40.7% had children under the age of 18 living with them, 67.5% were married couples living together, 6.6% had a female householder with no husband present, and 22.3% were non-families. 18.0% of all households were made up of individuals, and 5.6% had someone living alone who was 65 years of age or older. The average household size was 2.70 and the average family size was 3.09.

In the town, the population was spread out, with 29.0% under the age of 18, 6.5% from 18 to 24, 32.0% from 25 to 44, 22.1% from 45 to 64, and 10.3% who were 65 years of age or older. The median age was 37 years. For every 100 females, there were 105.6 males. For every 100 females age 18 and over, there were 103.6 males.

The median income for a household in the town was $46,912, and the median income for a family was $51,188. Males had a median income of $30,680 versus $23,935 for females. The per capita income for the town was $20,261. About 3.4% of families and 4.3% of the population were below the poverty line, including 5.1% of those under age 18 and 6.2% of those age 65 or over.
