= Bellinger, Wisconsin =

Unincorporated community in Wisconsin, United States

- Unincorporated community
- Location within Wisconsin Location within the United States
- Coordinates: 45°04′31″N 90°48′00″W
- Country: United States
- State: Wisconsin
- County: Taylor
- Elevation: 1,289 ft (393 m)
- Time zone: UTC-6 (Central (CST))
  - Summer (DST): UTC-5 (CDT)
- Area codes: 715 & 534
- GNIS feature ID: 1561543

Bellinger is an unincorporated community located in the towns of Roosevelt and Taft, in Taylor County, Wisconsin, United States. The community was named for an early settler by the name of John Bellinger.
