= Hammel, Wisconsin =

- Town
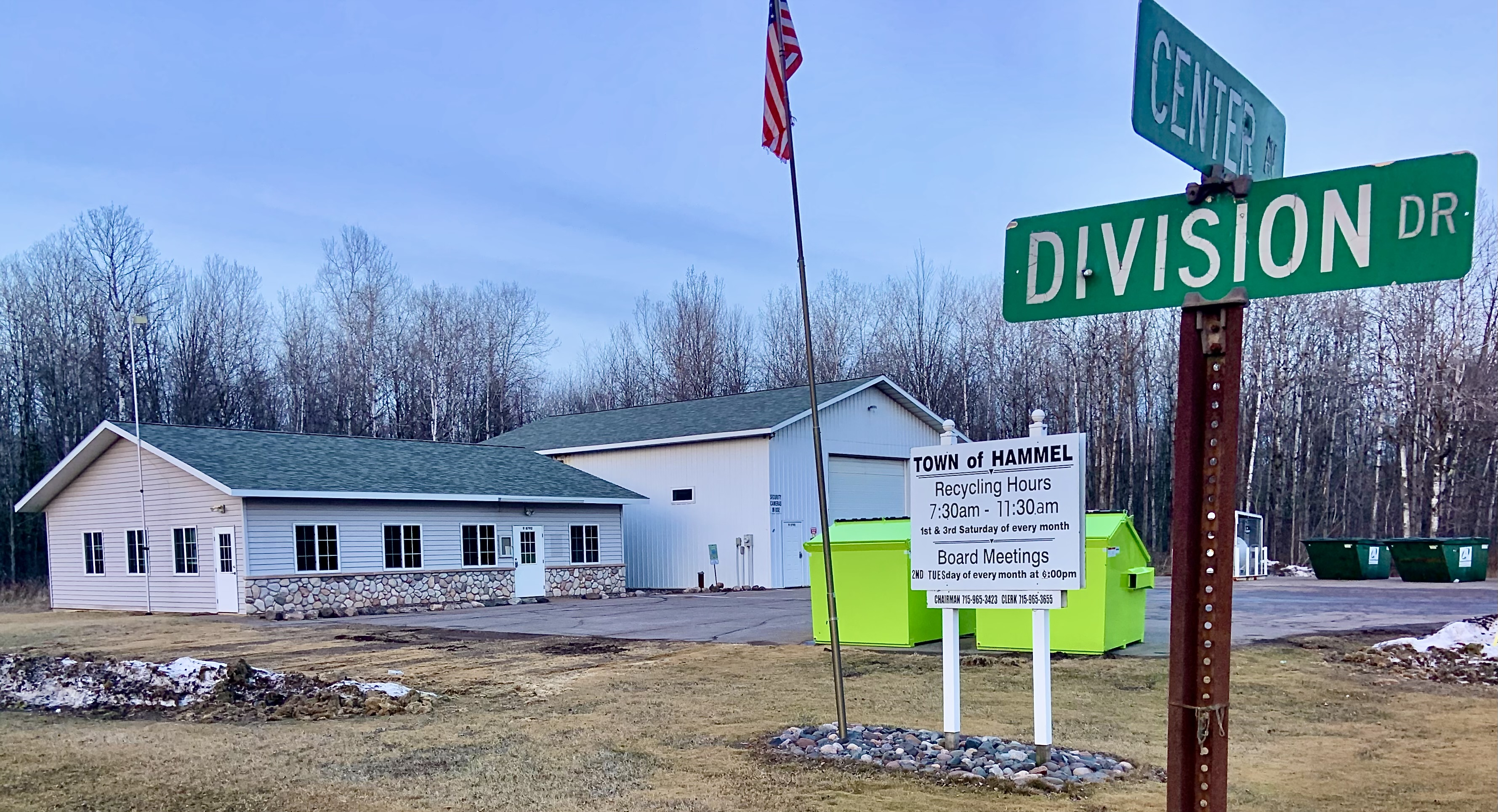
- Town hall

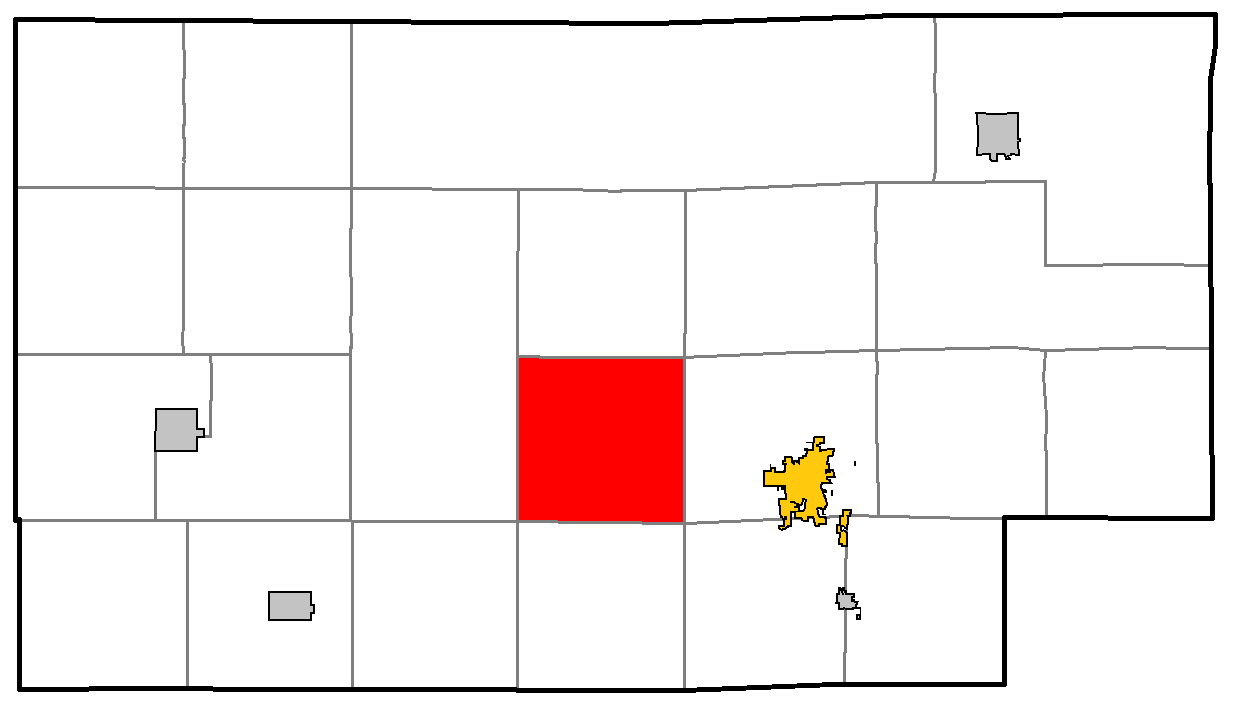
- Location of Hammel, within Taylor County

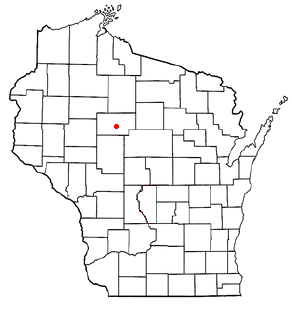
- Location of Hammel, Wisconsin
- Coordinates: 45°9′32″N 90°29′15″W
- Country: United States
- State: Wisconsin
- County: Taylor

Area
  - Total: 35.7 sq mi (92.5 km^{2})
  - Land: 35.5 sq mi (91.9 km^{2})
  - Water: 0.23 sq mi (0.6 km^{2})
- Elevation: 1,352 ft (412 m)

Population (2020)
  - Total: 703
  - Density: 19.8/sq mi (7.65/km^{2})
- Time zone: UTC-6 (Central (CST))
  - Summer (DST): UTC-5 (CDT)
- Area codes: 715 & 534
- FIPS code: 55-32300
- GNIS feature ID: 1583341
- PLSS township: T31N R1W
- Website: https://www.townofhammel.com/

Hammel is a town in Taylor County, Wisconsin, United States. The population was 703 at the 2020 census. The unincorporated community of Murat is located in the town.

== Geography ==
According to the United States Census Bureau, the town has a total area of 35.7 square miles (92.5 km^{2}), of which 35.5 square miles (91.9 km^{2}) is land and 0.2 square mile (0.6 km^{2}) (0.70%) is water.

Geologists believe the last glacier to advance into this area stopped its advance at a line running through northern Hammel, just south of Lake Isadore, then retreated. See the map and discussion in the article on Taylor County.

== History ==
The six mile (10 km) square that would become Hammel was first surveyed in the summer of 1847 by a crew working for the U.S. government. Then in late 1857 another crew marked all the section corners in the township, walking through the woods and over frozen swamps, measuring with chain and compass. When done, the deputy surveyor filed this general description:

This Township contains several Tamarac and Cedar Swamp some of considerable extent and mostly unfit for cultivation. The Surface is generally rolling and 2nd rate soil except on the Black River bottoms it is 1st rate soil. Timber is very heavy all over the Township Chiefly Hemlock Birch Pine Maple Tamarac and Cedar.

Black River enters the Township near the South East corner, it is generally Deep and flows in a gentle Current in a Westerly direction to the South West corner of the Township, not well adapted for good motive power or mills.

An 1880 map of central Wisconsin shows two roads from Medford reaching the east edge of what would become Hammel.

The Town of Hammel was organized in 1897.

A map from 1900 shows lots of settlement activity, particularly in the east. Some sort of roads followed the course of parts of modern County E along the east edge of the town. A predecessor of modern Perkinstown Avenue spanned the whole township, with short side-roads branching off to north and south. Along it were scattered settlers, three rural schools, and two sawmills. Another road followed the eastern two miles of modern Center Avenue. It too had scattered settlers and a rural school. Another road followed the course of modern Highway 64 and Sawyer Avenue across most of the town, with many settlers and two rural schools. Another followed the course of modern County O, with scattered settlers. Parts of the town, particularly in the west, were still largely unsettled, still mostly in large blocks owned by logging companies like Sawyer & Austin and the Holways. Sawyer's log-driving dam on the Black River was marked at the west edge of the town. The Wisconsin Central Railroad still owned portions of the odd-numbered sections. The railroad had been given most of the odd-numbered sections for 18 miles on both sides of its line through Medford to finance building that railroad line up through the wilderness. By 1900 it had sold most of its land in Hammel, but still held some chunks.

A village of Murat was platted around Lake Esadore. The map shows a hotel and "hall" about where the High View Inn now is, and a school out west of Mud Lake. One of the two sawmills stood where the outlet of Esadore crosses Perkinstown Avenue. It was in operation by 1900 and closed after burning in 1903.

The 1911 plat map shows little change from 1900. The roads had reached farther and more settlers had filled in along them in the east. The far west was still mostly in large blocks, with some changes of ownership and few settlers.

In 1933 parts of the northwest quarter of Hammel were designated part of the Chequamegon National Forest.

Lake Esadore lies behind the High View.

== Demographics ==
As of the census of 2000, there were 735 people, 265 households, and 219 families residing in the town. The population density was 20.7 people per square mile (8.0/km^{2}). There were 346 housing units at an average density of 9.8 per square mile (3.8/km^{2}). The racial makeup of the town was 98.78% White, 0.14% African American, 0.27% Native American, 0.68% Asian, and 0.14% from two or more races.

There were 265 households, out of which 38.9% had children under the age of 18 living with them, 75.8% were married couples living together, 3.0% had a female householder with no husband present, and 17.0% were non-families. 14.7% of all households were made up of individuals, and 4.9% had someone living alone who was 65 years of age or older. The average household size was 2.77 and the average family size was 3.05.

In the town, the population was spread out, with 27.5% under the age of 18, 8.2% from 18 to 24, 30.3% from 25 to 44, 26.5% from 45 to 64, and 7.5% who were 65 years of age or older. The median age was 36 years. For every 100 females, there were 108.2 males. For every 100 females age 18 and over, there were 114.1 males.

The median income for a household in the town was $51,250, and the median income for a family was $53,281. Males had a median income of $30,089 versus $26,319 for females. The per capita income for the town was $17,425. About 3.7% of families and 7.6% of the population were below the poverty line, including 10.4% of those under age 18 and 10.9% of those age 65 or over.

== Notable people ==
- Anthony J. Opachen, Wisconsin State Representative and laborer, was born in the town
