= Maplehurst, Wisconsin =

- Town
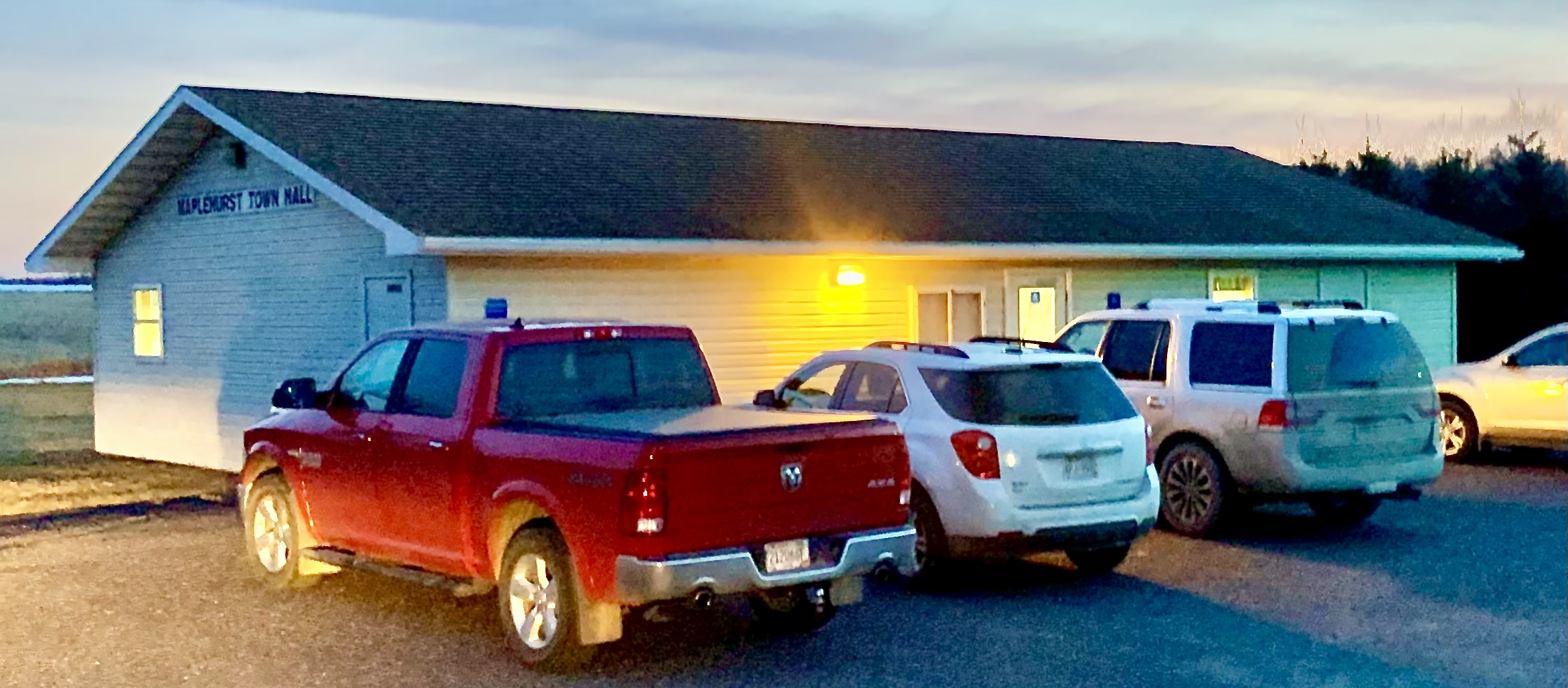
- Town hall

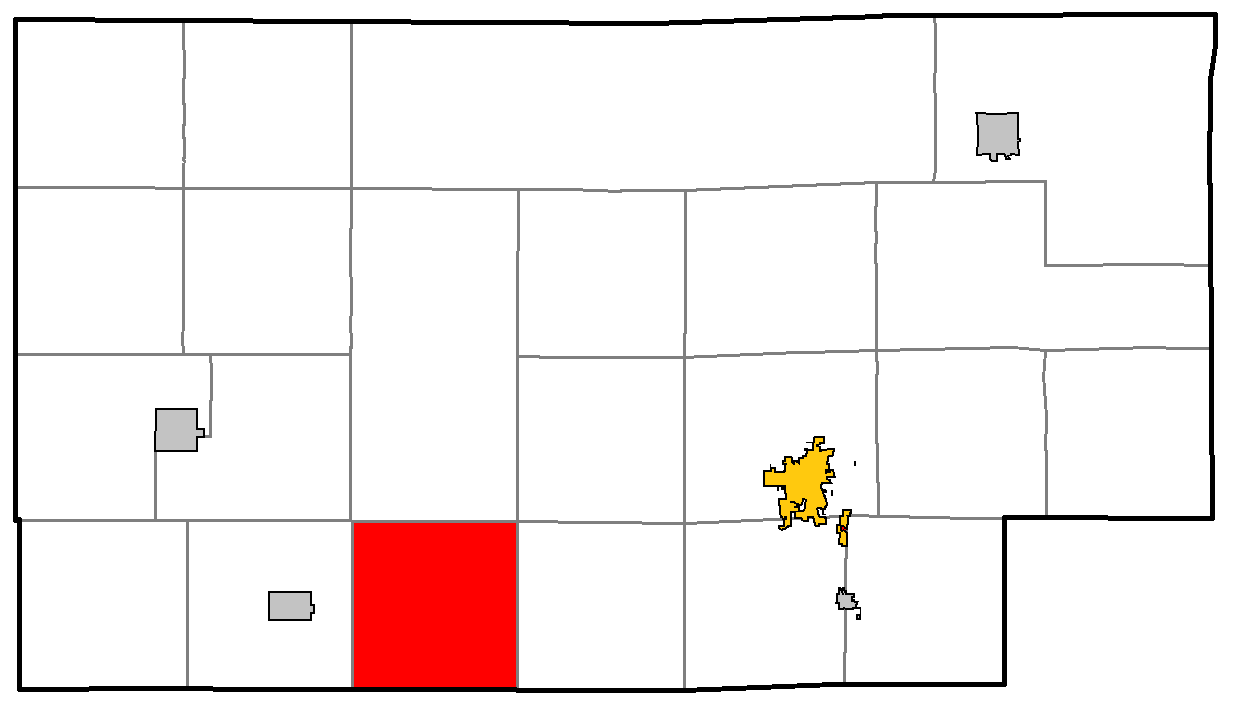
- Location of Maplehurst, within Taylor County

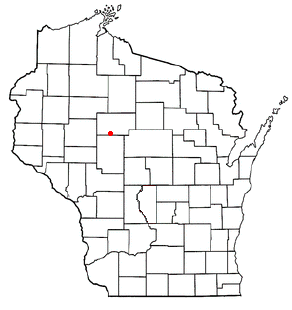
- Location of Maplehurst, Wisconsin
- Coordinates: 45°3′37″N 90°37′4″W
- Country: United States
- State: Wisconsin
- County: Taylor

Area
  - Total: 35.9 sq mi (93.1 km^{2})
  - Land: 35.9 sq mi (93.0 km^{2})
  - Water: 0.039 sq mi (0.1 km^{2})
- Elevation: 1,280 ft (390 m)

Population (2020)
  - Total: 338
  - Density: 9.41/sq mi (3.63/km^{2})
- Time zone: UTC-6 (Central (CST))
  - Summer (DST): UTC-5 (CDT)
- Area codes: 715 & 534
- FIPS code: 55-48925
- GNIS feature ID: 1583645
- PLSS township: T30N R2W

Maplehurst is a town in Taylor County, Wisconsin, United States. The population was 338 at the 2020 census.

== Geography ==
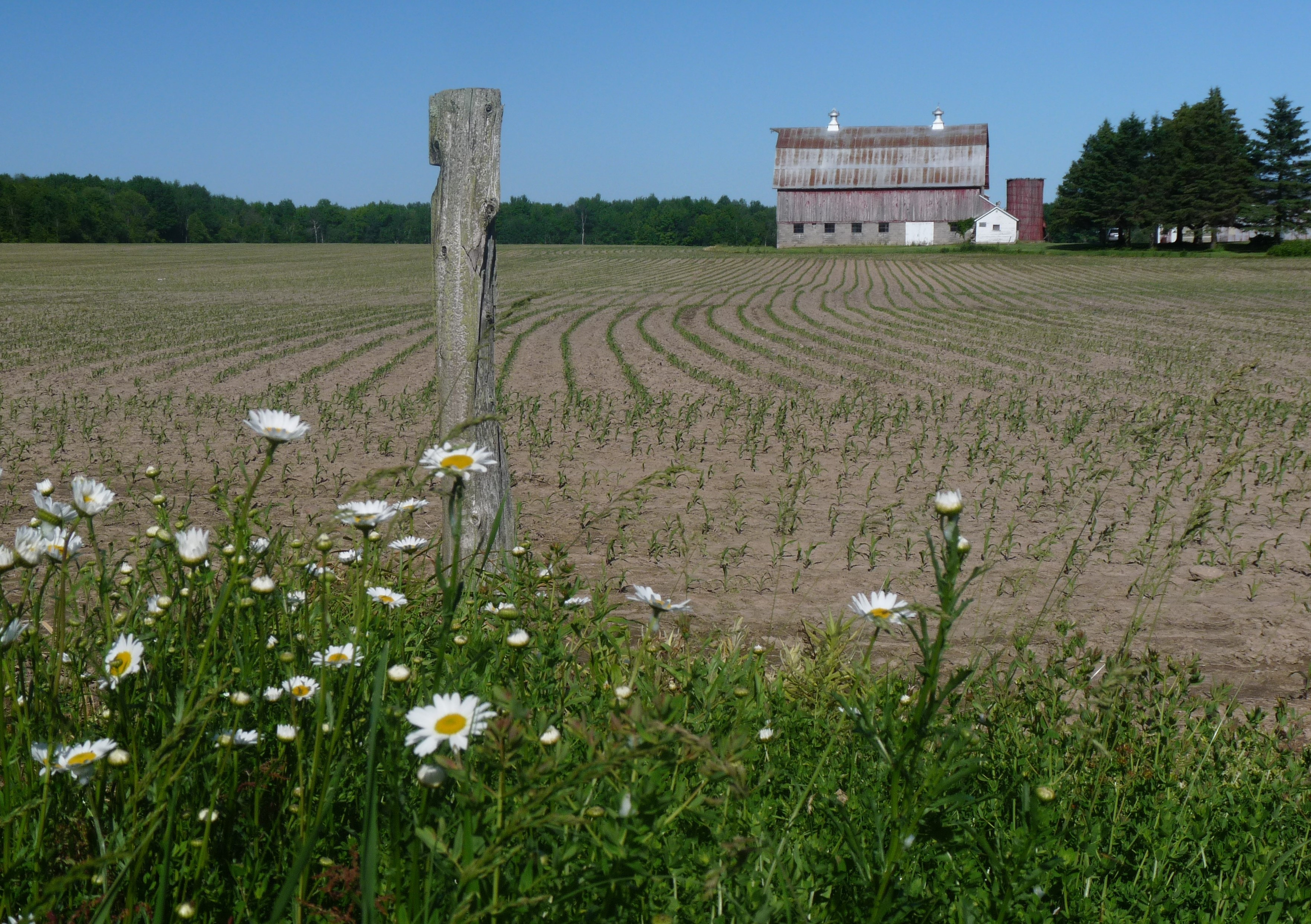
One-time dairy farm in a flat part of Maplehurst

According to the United States Census Bureau, the town has a total area of 35.9 square miles (93.1 km^{2}), of which 35.9 square miles (93.0 km^{2}) is land and 0.04 square mile (0.1 km^{2}) (0.06%) is water.

The northwestern corner of Maplehurst lies in the hilly terminal moraine that runs from Westboro through Perkinstown and Lublin. That land is choppy because it has had only about 15,000 years to level out after being dumped by the last glacier. Within that northwestern moraine are some ice-walled lake plains, which are fairly level and farmable. Outside Maplehurst's northwestern corner, most of the town is fairly flat, covered with till deposited by some earlier glacier at an unknown date, with much more time to erode and level out. The Black River and smaller streams have cut channels through that flat area.

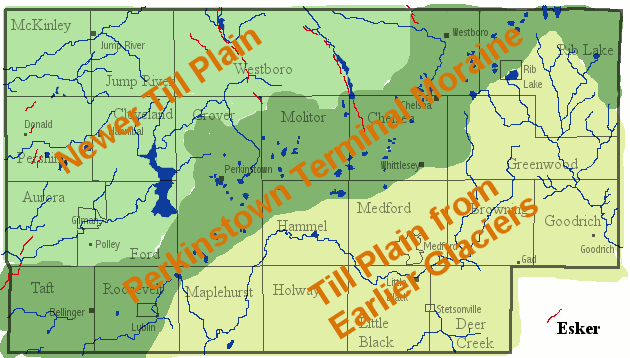
Glacial landforms of Taylor County.

== History ==
The six mile square that would become Maplehurst was first surveyed in the summer of 1847 by a crew working for the U.S. government. Then in May 1854 another crew marked all the section corners in the township, moving on foot, measuring with chain and compass. When done, the deputy surveyor filed this general description:

This Township contains numerous Swamps many of which are of considerable extent. The Surface of the Township is generally broken the Soil is very poor 3rd rate producing very little vegetation but the Surface of the land is generally covered with a thick heavy moss. The Timber through the Township is principally Hemlock. There are a few Scattering trees(?) of White Pine of poor quality. The Township is well watered with numerous Small Streams and also Black River Which enters the Township in Section 1 & flows in a South Westerly direction until it reaches the South boundary of the Township in Section 32. The banks of this Stream are generally high the current is gentle the bottom of the Stream is generally Rocky. There are no Settlers in this Township.

An 1880 map of the area shows no development in what would become the town of Maplehurst except "A.E. Sawyer" in section 2 near the Black River - a logging camp for Sawyer's firm in Black River Falls.

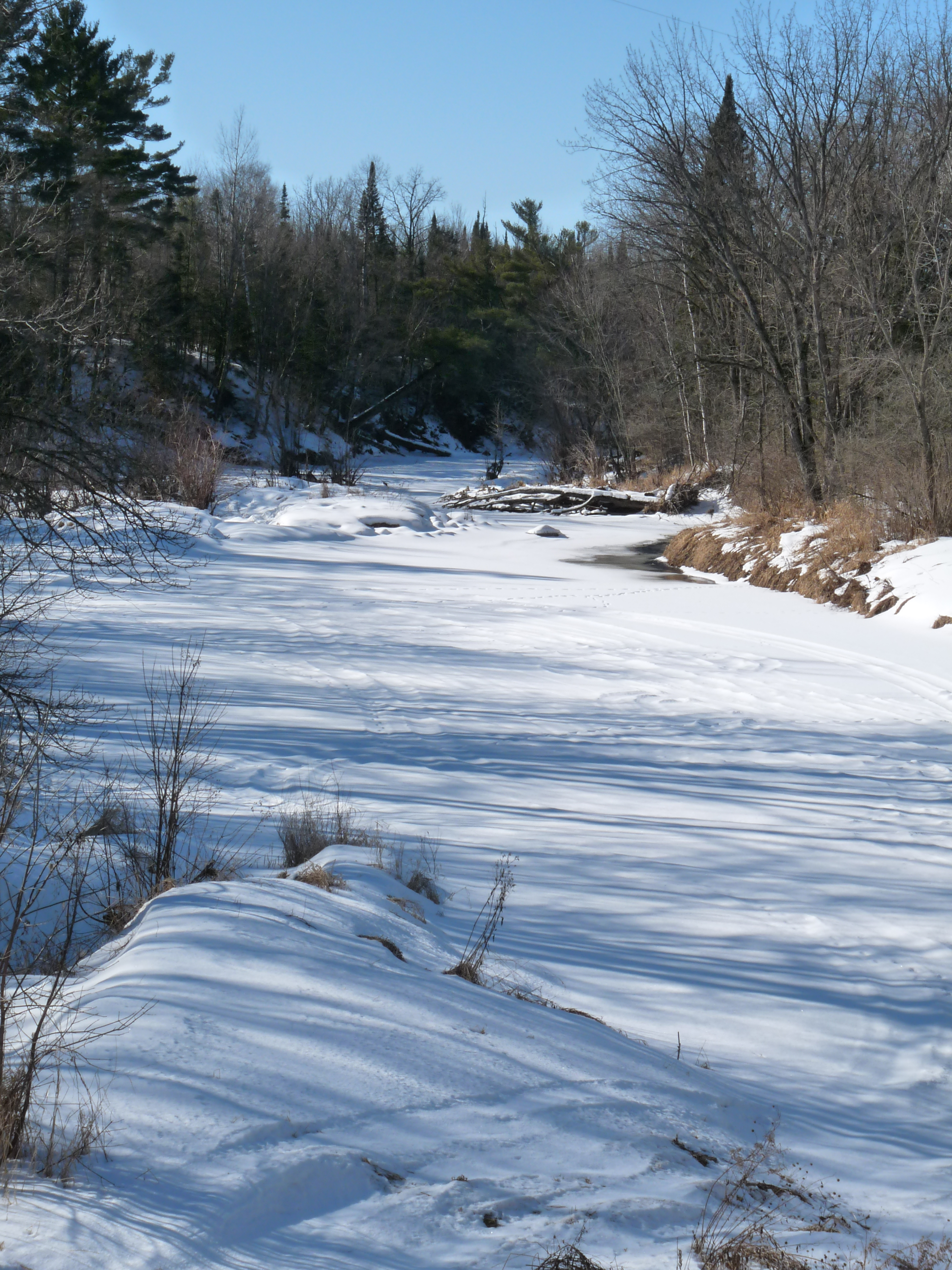
At the northeast corner of Maplehurst, looking down the Black River from Highway 64

A map from around 1900 shows the Wisconsin Central Railroad owning more of what would become Maplehurst than anyone else. In the 1870s the Wisconsin Central had built the first rail line up through the forest that would become Medford. To finance that project, the U.S. government granted the Wisconsin Central half the land for eighteen miles on both sides of their track - generally the odd-numbered sections - and Maplehurst lay within eighteen miles. By 1900 the Wisconsin Central had sold some of that land to lumber companies, but still held some large chunks. The next largest land-holders were Sawyer and Austin, J.M. Holway, and the N. Wisconsin Land Co. Also appearing on this map is a sawmill on the Black River near modern Shady Nook Lane. The map also shows some sort of road following some of the north edge of the township on the course of modern highway 64. Another road roughly follows the course of modern County A into the east half of the town. Settlers are also starting to appear along the Black, with the largest group five homesteads with Scandinavian names near modern Putnam Drive and Rabbit Ave.

The 1911 plat map of Maplehurst shows more roads, more settlers, and a community of Maplehurst platted at the intersection of modern County T and Shiner Ave. A map of the community from 1913 shows neatly planned streets, a hotel, a store and a school. Some claim a railroad spur ran to Maplehurst from the Soo Line to the south. For a mile or two around this community, the map shows a fairly complete road grid. A road has also reached up the course of modern Putnam Drive and a school is marked near that group of settlers. Another school and a sawmill are also marked on the road that would become modern A. The south half of the town is fairly well filled with settlers. Most of the north half is not - still mostly owned by the Wisconsin Central, land companies, and lumber companies. The Wisconsin Central/Soo Line cuts across the very southwest corner, heading toward Lublin and eventually Superior. The Owen Lumber Company's logging spur cuts across the northwest corner near Diamond Lake. But the transition from logging to farming was well under way.

== Demographics ==
As of the census of 2000, there were 359 people, 133 households, and 98 families residing in the town. The population density was 10.0 people per square mile (3.9/km^{2}). There were 144 housing units at an average density of 4.0 per square mile (1.5/km^{2}). The racial makeup of the town was 97.77% White, 0.56% Native American, 0.28% Asian, and 1.39% from two or more races. Hispanic or Latino of any race were 1.67% of the population.

There were 133 households, out of which 34.6% had children under the age of 18 living with them, 59.4% were married couples living together, 9.0% had a female householder with no husband present, and 26.3% were non-families. 21.1% of all households were made up of individuals, and 9.8% had someone living alone who was 65 years of age or older. The average household size was 2.70 and the average family size was 3.14.

In the town, the population was spread out, with 28.4% under the age of 18, 8.4% from 18 to 24, 27.3% from 25 to 44, 25.3% from 45 to 64, and 10.6% who were 65 years of age or older. The median age was 35 years. For every 100 females, there were 118.9 males. For every 100 females age 18 and over, there were 108.9 males.

The median income for a household in the town was $29,375, and the median income for a family was $32,813. Males had a median income of $26,429 versus $20,000 for females. The per capita income for the town was $13,062. About 11.7% of families and 19.2% of the population were below the poverty line, including 26.4% of those under age 18 and 8.5% of those age 65 or over.
