= Taft, Wisconsin =

- Town
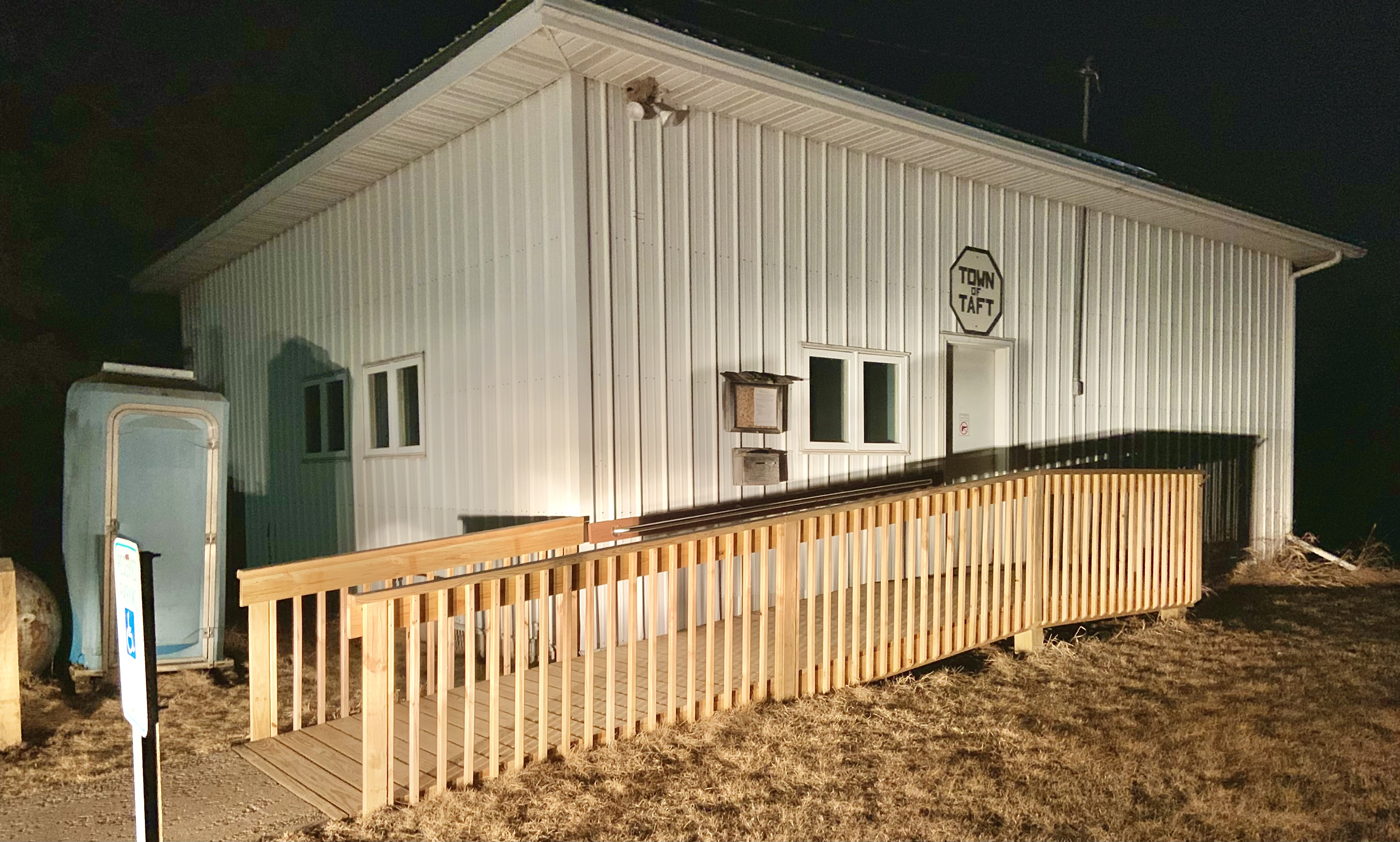
- Town hall

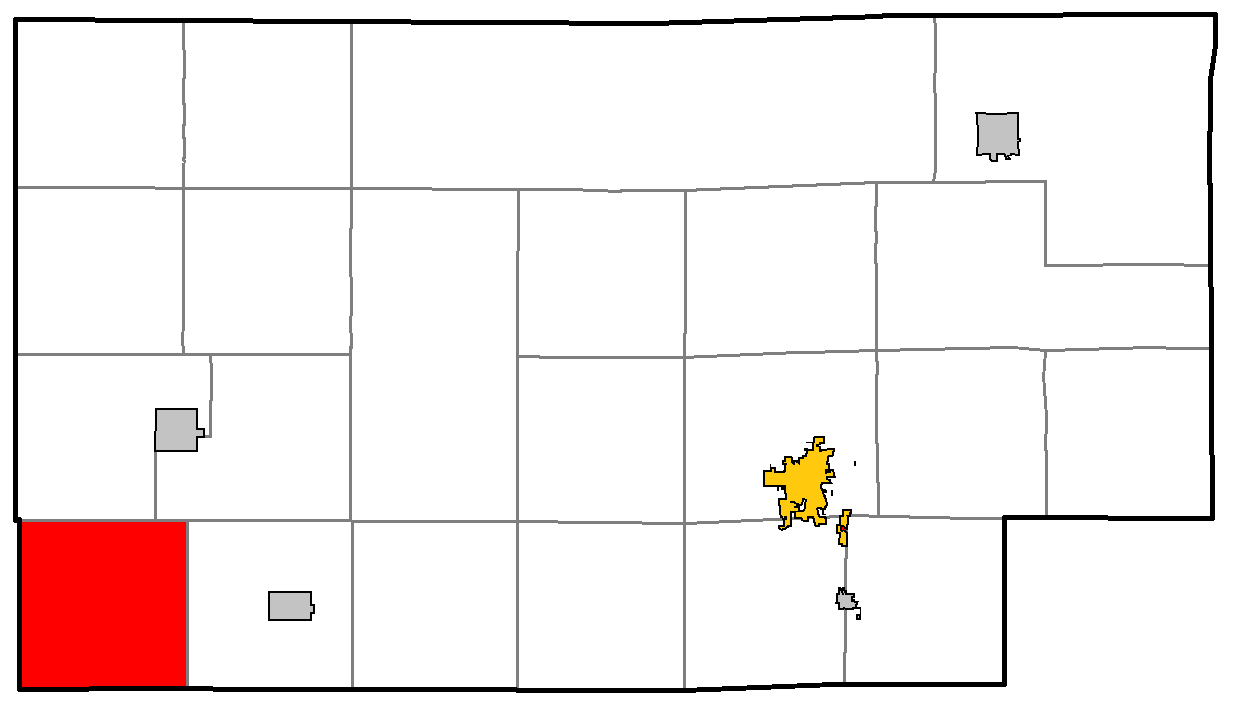
- Location of Taft, within Taylor County

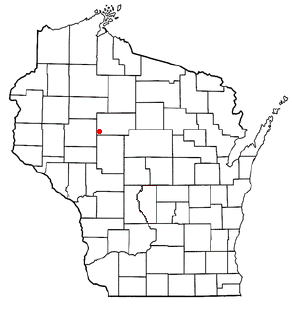
- Location of Taft, Wisconsin
- Coordinates: 45°3′56″N 90°52′13″W
- Country: United States
- State: Wisconsin
- County: Taylor

Area
  - Total: 36.6 sq mi (94.9 km^{2})
  - Land: 36.5 sq mi (94.5 km^{2})
  - Water: 0.12 sq mi (0.3 km^{2})
- Elevation: 1,210 ft (370 m)

Population (2020)
  - Total: 310
  - Density: 8.5/sq mi (3.3/km^{2})
- Time zone: UTC-6 (Central (CST))
  - Summer (DST): UTC-5 (CDT)
- Area codes: 715 & 534
- FIPS code: 55-78950
- GNIS feature ID: 1584265
- PLSS township: T30N R4W
- Website: https://townoftaftwi.com/

Taft is a town in the southwestern corner of Taylor County, Wisconsin, United States. The population was 310 at the 2020 census. The unincorporated community of Bellinger is located partially in the town.

== Geography ==
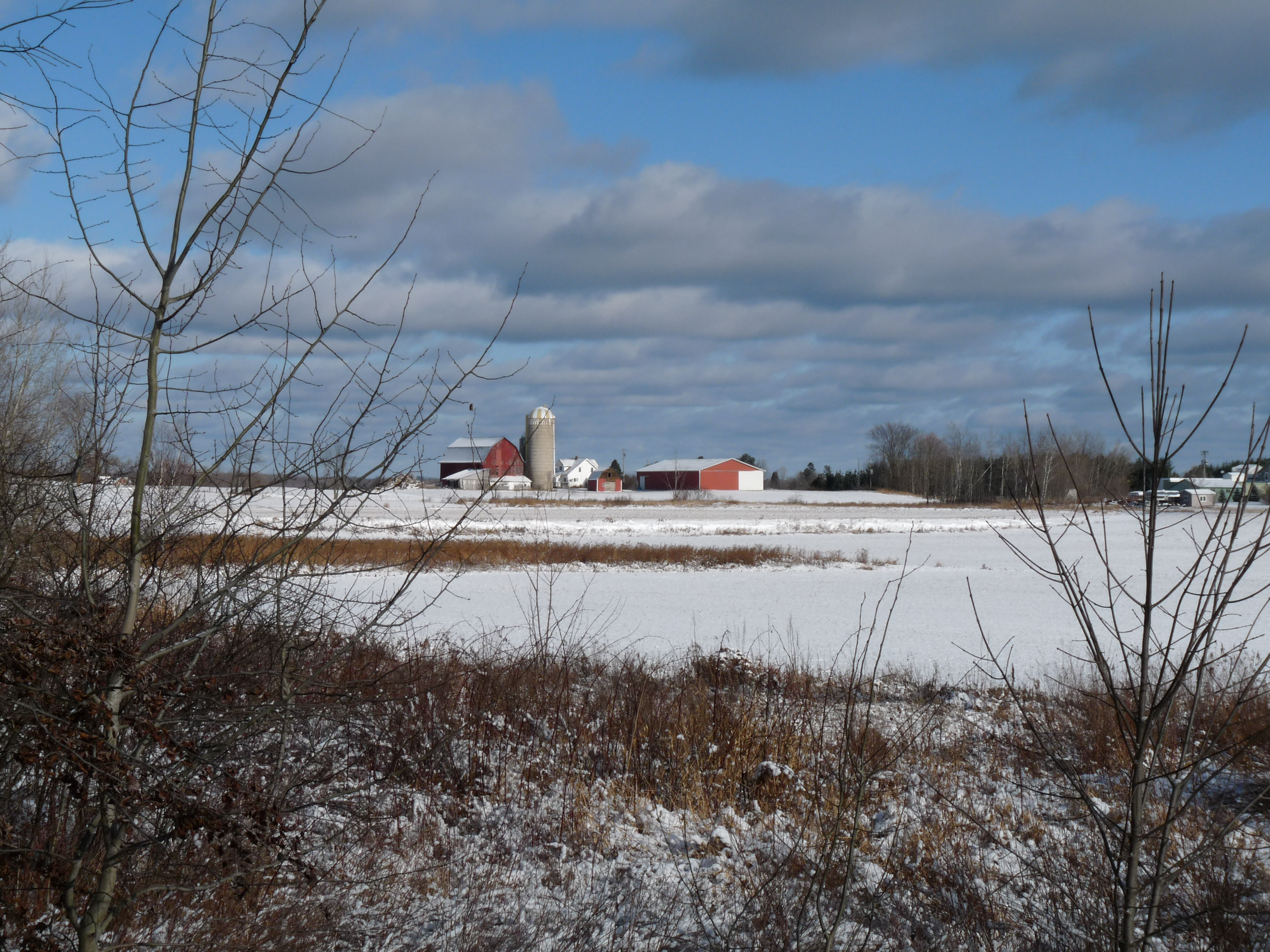

According to the United States Census Bureau, the town has a total area of 36.6 square miles (94.8 km^{2}), of which 36.5 square miles (94.5 km^{2}) is land and 0.1 square mile (0.3 km^{2}) (0.35%) is water.

Taft lies within the Perkinstown terminal moraine, a line of hills left when the Chippewa lobe of the last glacier stopped advancing and retreated, described further under Taylor County geography. An esker wanders through the northwest corner of Taft, and ice-walled lake plains are interspersed among the choppy hills. Peat soils have developed in some low spots.

== History ==
In July 1847 a crew working for the U.S. government surveyed the boundaries of the six mile square which would become Taft. This was repeated in late 1848. Then in June 1854 another crew marked all the section corners in the township, walking through the woods and swamps, measuring with chain and compass. When done, the deputy surveyor filed this general description:

The Surface of this Township is generally Broken Soil 3rd rate producing but little vegetation the Surface of the land being generally covered with a thick heavy moss(?). There are numerous Swamp in the Township Some of which are of considerable extent. The Timber in the Swamps is principally Tamarac. The dry land is timbered mostly with Hemlock. There are Some Scattering groves of White Pine though of poor quality and not valuable for lumber. The Township is well watered with numerous Small Streams which rise in the Swamps. There are no Settlers in the Township.

By 1900, most of what would become Taft was owned by lumber companies. The Northwestern Lumber Company owned a large block in the southeast corner and had built its Stanley, Merrill and Phillips Railway into that block three or four miles. The other largest landholders were Chippewa Lumber and Boom Co., and Lindsay & Phelps. One settler is marked on the map for the whole section: Hobbs has a homestead near Otter Creek.

By 1911 the SM&P had pushed all the way through the town and far beyond. Some sort of road followed the course of modern County F across the middle of the township, and the north-bound jog continued up what is now Skyline Drive. Another road followed the course of modern highway 73 south to the county line, and that southeast corner has a fairly complete road grid, though these roads must have been crude. In this corner the Northwestern Lumber Co. had succeeded in selling most of its logged land to settlers, most with Polish names. In 1911 there were far more settlers here and around Lublin than anywhere else in western Taylor County. The rest of Taft had a few settlers at this time, with most of the land still in lumber company hands - Chippewa Lumber and Boom holding the majority.

== Demographics ==
As of the census of 2000, there were 361 people, 120 households, and 84 families residing in the town. The population density was 9.9 people per square mile (3.8/km^{2}). There were 132 housing units at an average density of 3.6 per square mile (1.4/km^{2}). The racial makeup of the town was 97.51% White, 0.55% Native American, 0.28% Asian, 1.11% from other races, and 0.55% from two or more races. Hispanic or Latino people of any race were 1.39% of the population.

There were 120 households, out of which 40.8% had children under the age of 18 living with them, 64.2% were married couples living together, 2.5% had a female householder with no husband present, and 29.2% were non-families. 20.8% of all households were made up of individuals, and 10.8% had someone living alone who was 65 years of age or older. The average household size was 3.01 and the average family size was 3.64.

In the town, the population was spread out, with 34.3% under the age of 18, 8.0% from 18 to 24, 25.5% from 25 to 44, 17.2% from 45 to 64, and 15% who were 65 years of age or older. The median age was 37 years. For every 100 females, there were 109.9 males. For every 100 females age 18 and over, there were 119.4 males.

The median income for a household in the town was $37,500, and the median income for a family was $41,071. Males had a median income of $24,615 versus $21,429 for females. The per capita income for the town was $14,447. About 5.6% of families and 8.7% of the population were below the poverty line, including 10.4% of those under age 18 and 13.3% of those age 65 or over.
