= Aurora, Taylor County, Wisconsin =

Aurora, Wisconsin
- Town
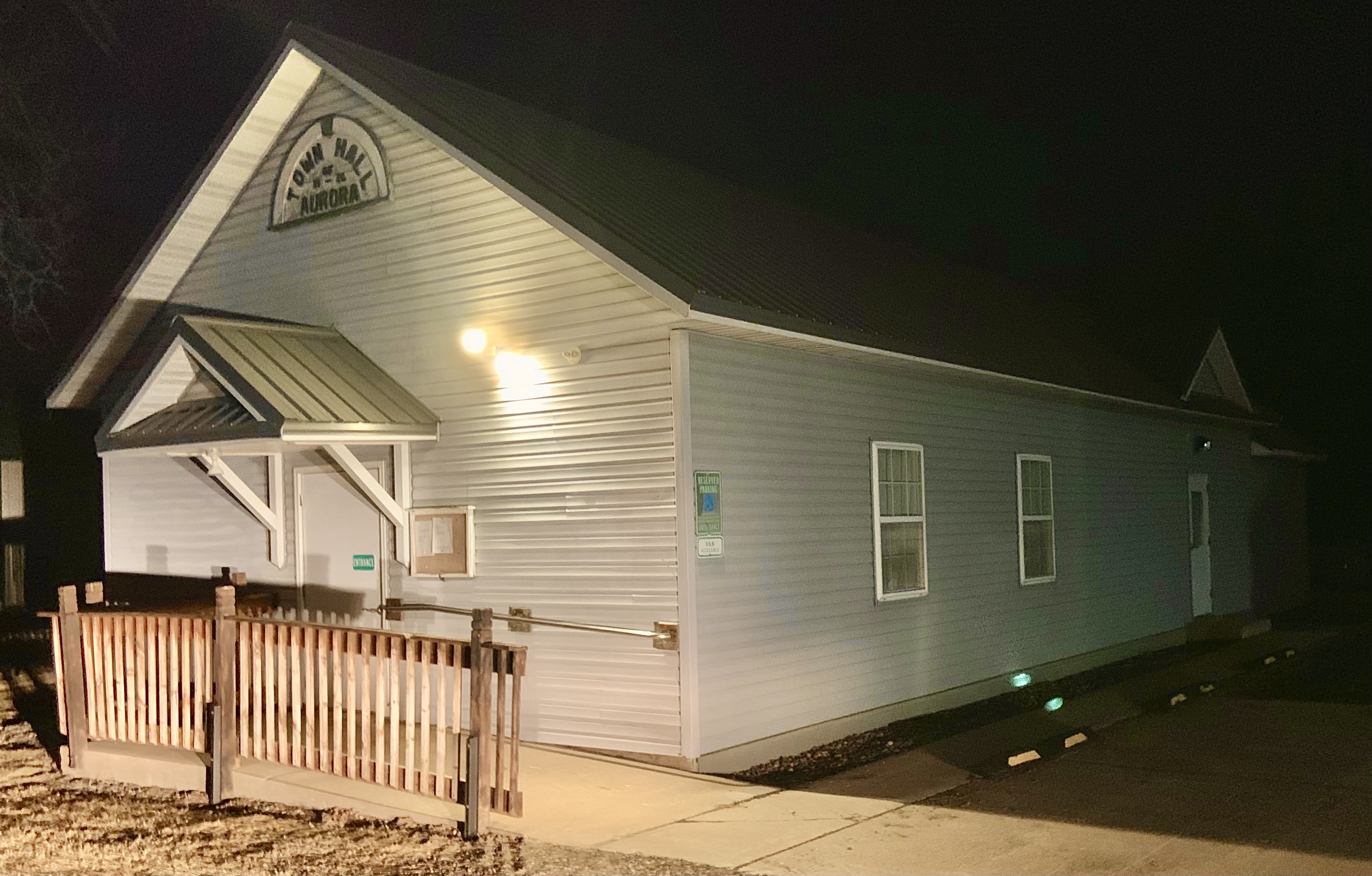
- Town hall

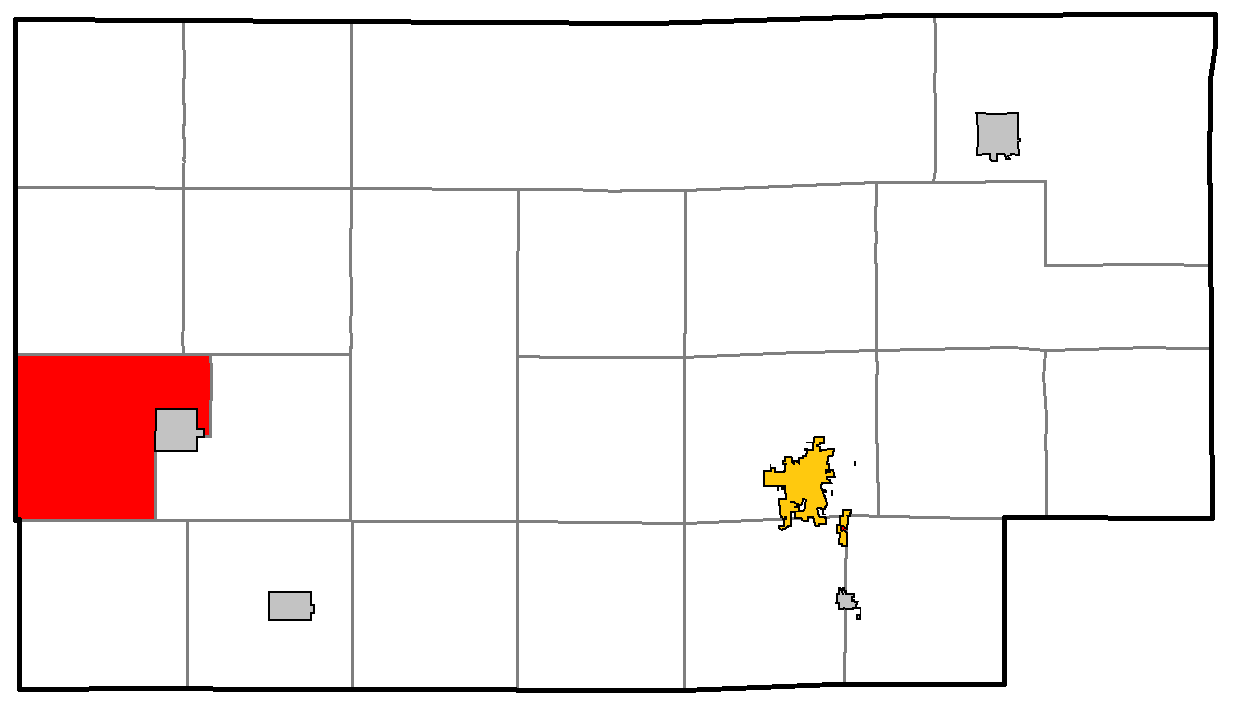
- Location of Aurora, Taylor County

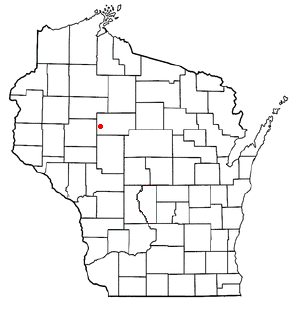
- Location of Aurora, Wisconsin
- Coordinates: 45°10′39″N 90°51′15″W
- Country: United States
- State: Wisconsin
- County: Taylor

Area
  - Total: 34.2 sq mi (88.6 km^{2})
  - Land: 34.2 sq mi (88.6 km^{2})
  - Water: 0 sq mi (0.0 km^{2})
- Elevation: 1,211 ft (369 m)

Population (2020)
  - Total: 459
  - Density: 13.4/sq mi (5.18/km^{2})
- Time zone: UTC-6 (Central (CST))
  - Summer (DST): UTC-5 (CDT)
- Area codes: 715 & 534
- FIPS code: 55-03900
- GNIS feature ID: 1582735
- PLSS township: T31N R4W, roughly
- Website: https://www.aurorawisconsin.org/

Aurora is a town in Taylor County, Wisconsin, United States. The population was 459 at the 2020 census.

== Geography ==
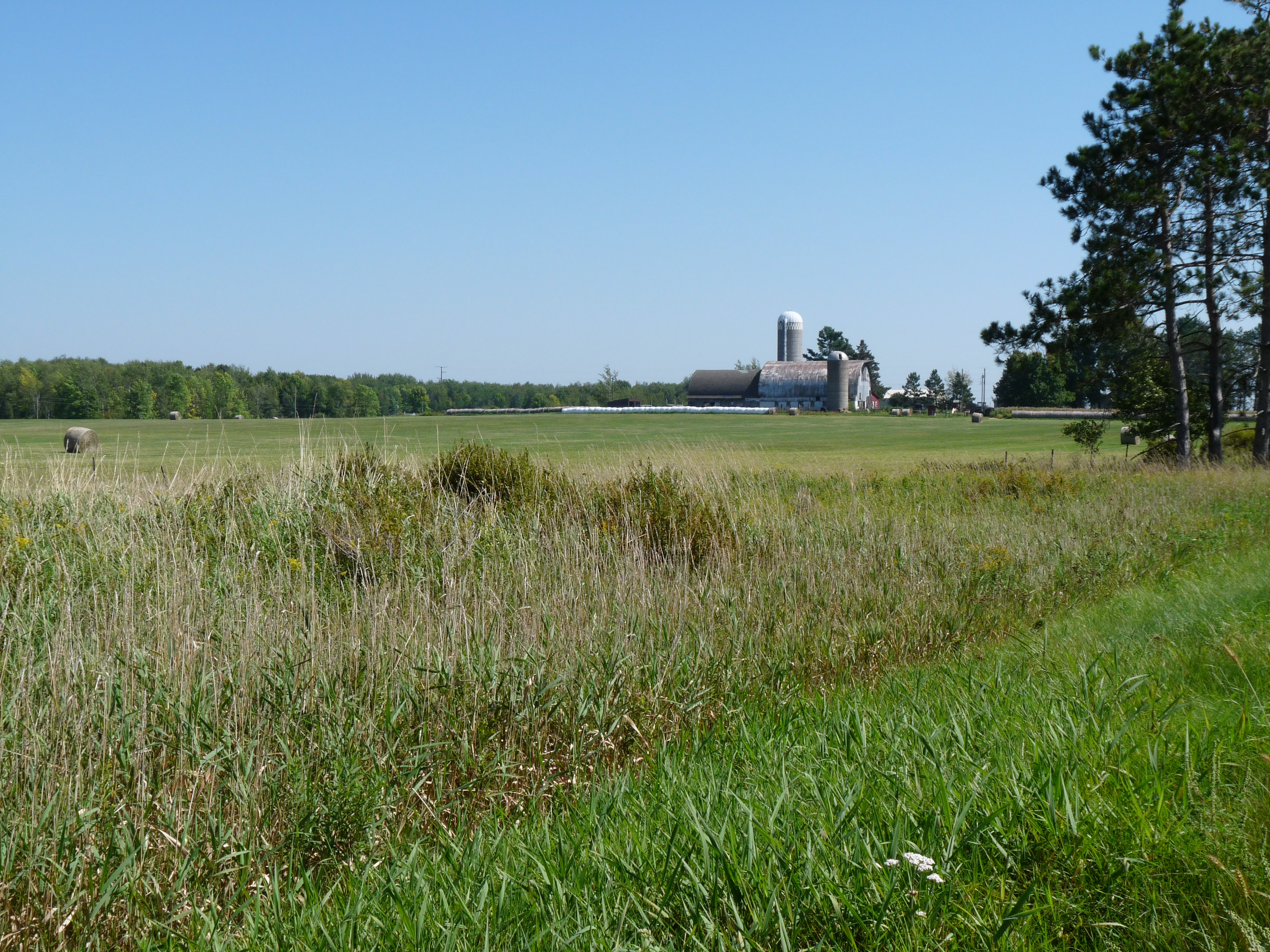
Most of Aurora is fairly flat with heavy soil, like this farm west of Gilman.

According to the United States Census Bureau, the town has a total area of 34.2 square miles (88.6 km^{2}), all land.

== History ==
In the mid-summer of 1847, a crew working for the U.S. government surveyed a six-mile (10 km) square which approximates the current boundaries of Aurora. In December 1854, another crew marked all the section corners in the township, walking through the woods and swamps, measuring them with a chain and a compass. When done, the deputy surveyor filed this general description:

This Township contains a few swamps some of considerable extent they are all unfit for cultivation. The River Enters the Town Near the NE Corner of section 24 and flows in a WSWesterly course with a Gentle current except a few Riffles where the current becomes Rapid. The soil is principally 2d rate. This Township is covered with timber The greater portion of which is Hemlock Y Birch Elm and Sugar. A number of small streams rise in this Township and flow in a SWesterly course toward its west boundary. The swamp except Alder are covered with moss(?). There is no improvements on this Township.

An 1880 map of the area shows a "winter road" entering what would become Aurora from Chippewa County and loosely paralleling the Yellow River on the north side. This tote road extended through the wilderness all the way to what would become Westboro. It was used to ferry supplies to equip logging camps for the winter logging season. During this phase the loggers focused on cutting white pine - the most valuable tree - floating the logs down the Yellow in spring log drives.

An 1888 map shows the first settlers. Paralleling the winter road, a wagon road followed the course of Polley Lane a mile and a half into the township, and about ten settlers were sprinkled around it, with a rural school at the end. The largest land-holders at that time were Chippewa Lumber and Boom Co., Bruce & Bayless, E. Pozwanski, and Westville Lumber Co.

A map from around 1900 shows still about ten homesteads in that southwest corner of the township near the river - half with Scandinavian names. The road had been extended to a few miles, turning down what would become River Road. The map still shows no settlers in the rest of the township, and no one at Gilman yet. Most of the land is held by lumber companies, with Chippewa Lumber and Boom and Northwestern Lumber Co holding the largest portions.

In 1902 and 1903 the Stanley, Merrill and Phillips Railway built its road up the east side of what would become Aurora, creating a station at Gilman. Around 1905 the J.S. Owen Company built a line for the Wisconsin Central heading northwest across the town for Ladysmith and Superior - now the Canadian National.

The 1911 plat map of the six mile square that would become Aurora shows the railroads in place. By this time the road that would become Polley Lane extends the full width of the six-mile square, and the road that would become River Road reaches across the river to the south edge of the town. Some sort of road follows the course of modern highway 64 west out of Gilman, with a branch heading north up the course of modern Gilman Road toward Hannibal. The road following 64 west goes only three miles, then tees north and south at modern Elder Road. The cluster of settlers in the SW corner has expanded somewhat, and a schoolhouse is marked where Polley Lane and River Road meet. The map also shows a few settlers on the east end, outside Gilman. Most of the land in the township is still owned by lumber companies, with the North Western Lumber Co. holding the majority. A few small chunks are held by Nye Lusk & Hudson, the local mill in Polley. Some smaller parcels are held by land companies: Faas Land Co. and American Immigration Co. Settlers and farming were beginning to encroach on logging.

== Demographics ==
As of the census of 2000, there were 386 people, 134 households, and 108 families residing in the town. The population density was 11.3 people per square mile (4.4/km^{2}). There were 154 housing units at an average density of 4.5 per square mile (1.7/km^{2}). The racial makeup of the town was 98.19% White, 0.26% Native American, 0.52% Asian, and 1.04% from two or more races.

There were 134 households, out of which 37.3% had children under the age of 18 living with them, 71.6% were married couples living together, 5.2% had a female householder with no husband present, and 19.4% were non-families. 17.2% of all households were made up of individuals, and 9.0% had someone living alone who was 65 years of age or older. The average household size was 2.88 and the average family size was 3.25.

In the town, the population was spread out, with 30.1% under the age of 18, 9.6% from 18 to 24, 21.5% from 25 to 44, 24.6% from 45 to 64, and 14.2% who were 65 years of age or older. The median age was 37 years. For every 100 females, there were 107.5 males. For every 100 females age 18 and over, there were 101.5 males.

The median income for a household in the town was $30,417, and the median income for a family was $34,583. Males had a median income of $29,500 versus $20,625 for females. The per capita income for the town was $14,374. About 17.5% of families and 22.6% of the population were below the poverty line, including 35.1% of those under age 18 and 10.4% of those age 65 or over.
