= Taylor County, Wisconsin =

County in Wisconsin, United States

- County
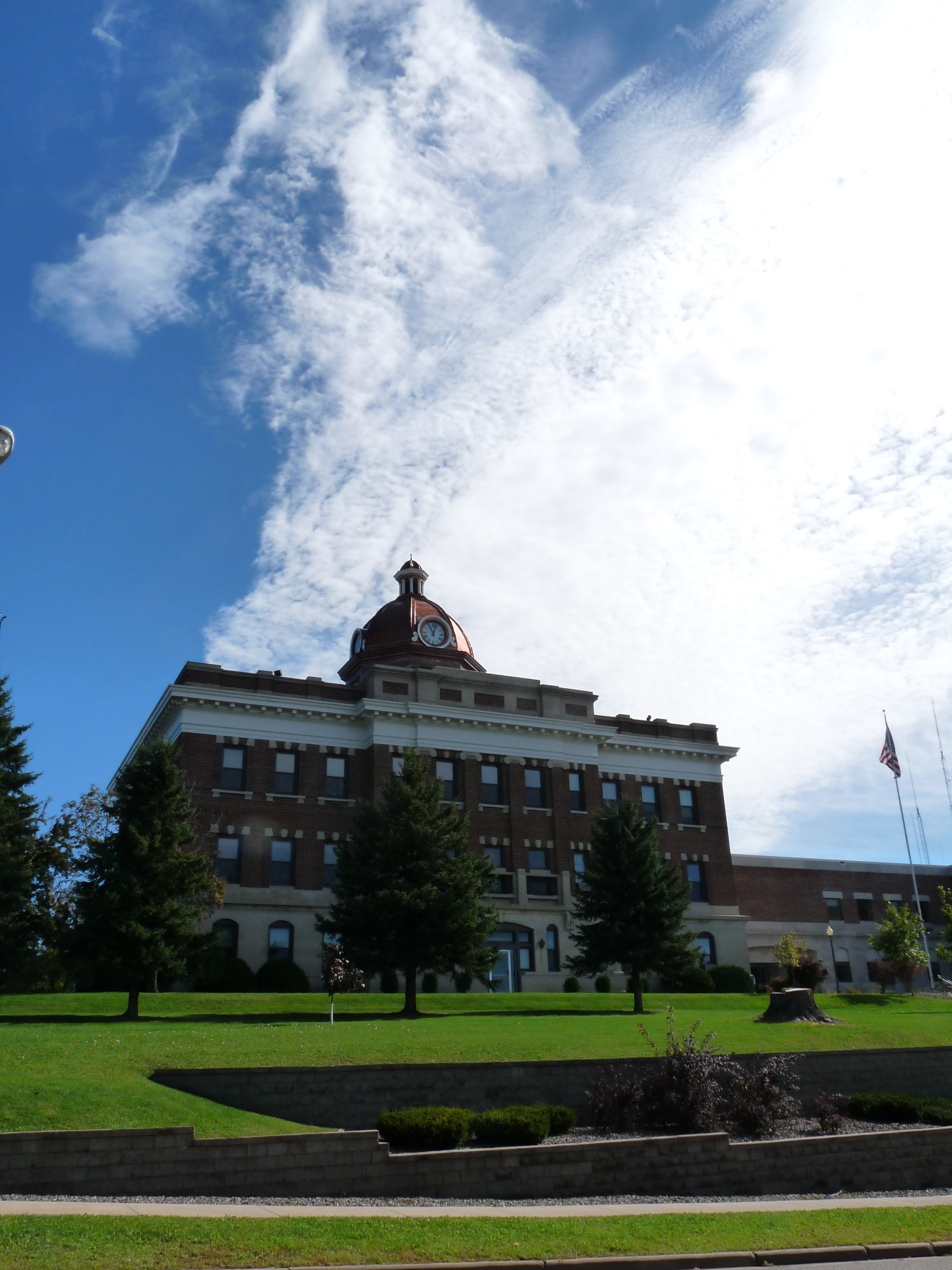
- The Taylor County Courthouse in Medford

- Location within the U.S. state of Wisconsin
- Coordinates: 45°13′N 90°30′W
- Country: United States
- State: Wisconsin
- Founded: 1875
- Seat: Medford
- Largest city: Medford

Area
  - Total: 984 sq mi (2,550 km^{2})
  - Land: 975 sq mi (2,530 km^{2})
  - Water: 9.5 sq mi (25 km^{2}) 1.0%

Population (2020)
  - Total: 19,913
  - Estimate (2025): 20,118 ▲
  - Density: 20.7/sq mi (8.0/km^{2})
- Time zone: UTC−6 (Central)
  - Summer (DST): UTC−5 (CDT)
- Congressional district: 7th
- Website: www.co.taylor.wi.us

Taylor County is a county in the U.S. state of Wisconsin. As of the 2020 census, the population was 19,913. Its county seat is Medford. It is mostly rural, lying roughly where corn and dairy farms to the south give way to forest and swamp to the north.

== History ==
The earliest recorded event in Taylor county probably occurred in 1661, when Wisconsin was claimed by New France. A band of Huron Indians from eastern Ontario had fled the Iroquois and taken refuge near the headwaters of the Black River, probably around Lake Chelsea in the northeast part of the county. Father René Menard, a French Jesuit priest who had travelled up the Great Lakes as far as Keweenaw Bay in upper Michigan, heard that these Hurons were starving. He decided to try to reach them to baptize them, despite his own weak health and scant supplies. In mid-summer, he and a French fur trader set out, following rivers and streams in birchbark canoes down into Wisconsin. Finally, a day's journey from the Huron camp, Father Menard separated from his travelling companion at a rapids to carry some supplies. He was never seen again. The place where he disappeared is believed to be the dells of the Big Rib River, below Goodrich in the southeast corner of Taylor county.

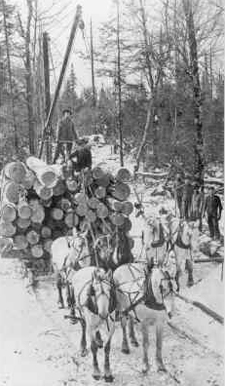
A crew hauling logs for the Fountain-Campbell Lumber Company in northwest Taylor County, 1909

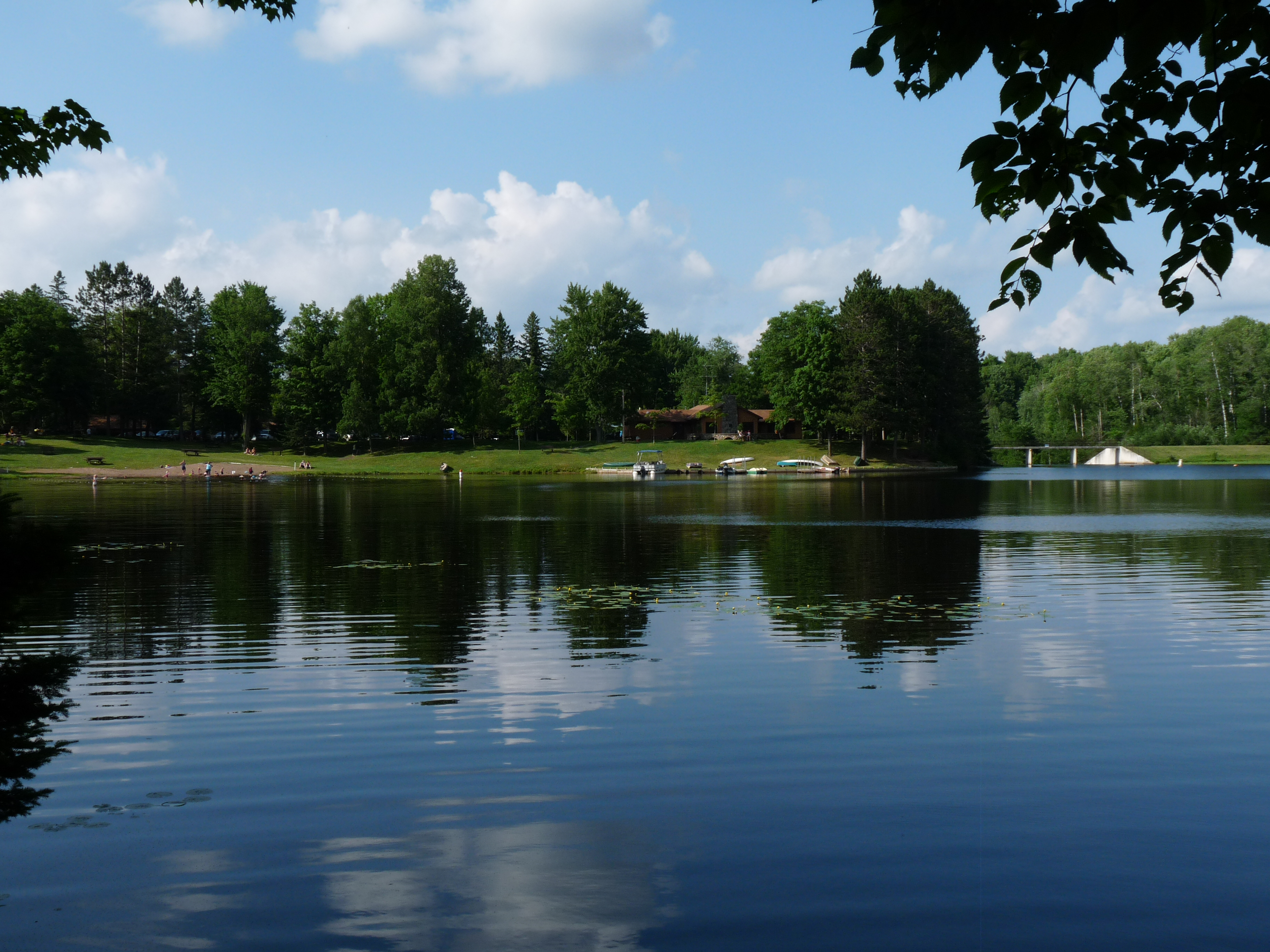
Mondeaux Dam Recreation Area, in the Chequamegon National Forest, in the north-central part of the county

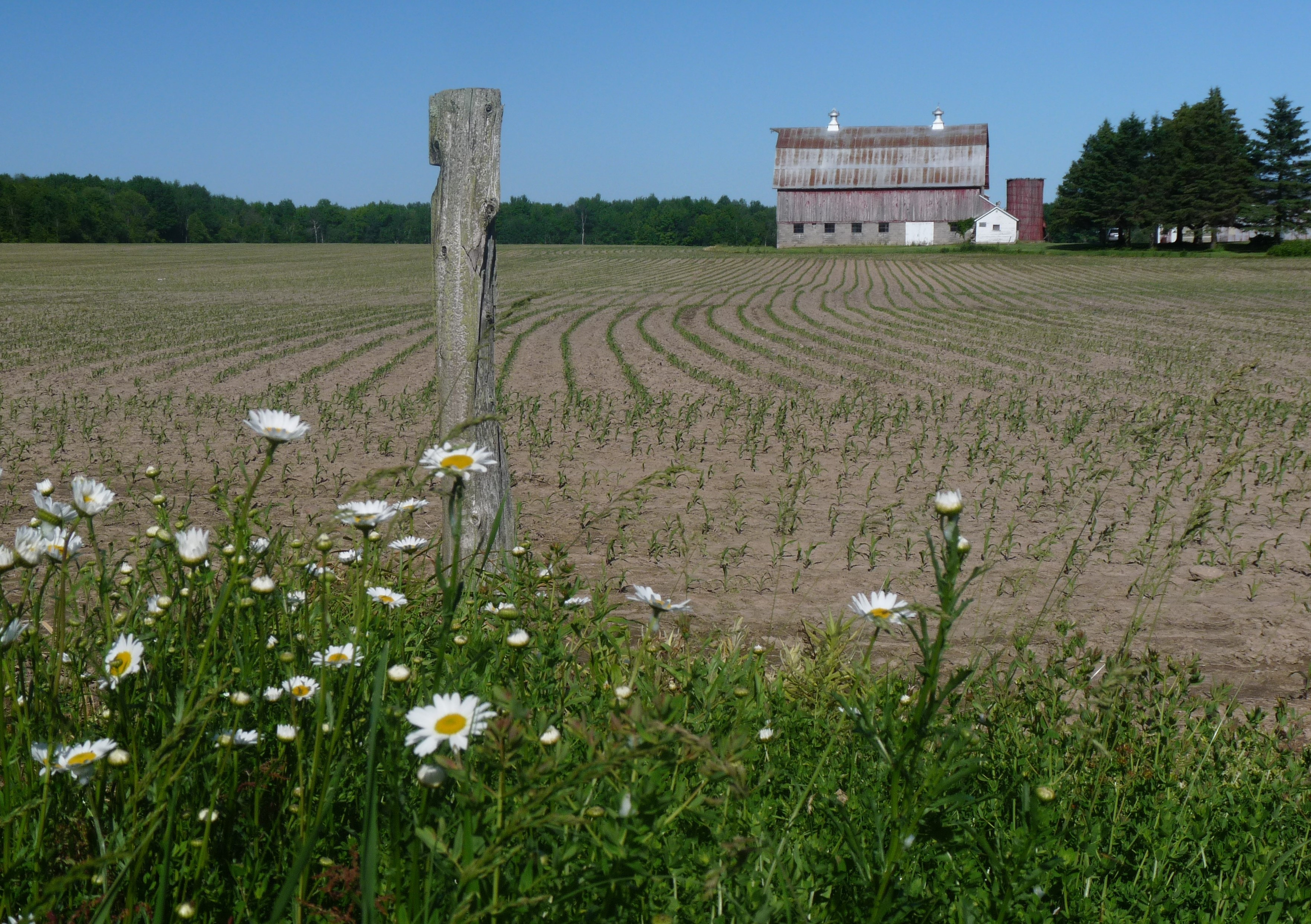
Many small dairy farms are switching to corn and soybeans

On June 8, 1847, before any settlers or loggers, a team of surveyors entered the county southwest of Medford, where County E now enters from Clark County. They were working for the U.S. government, marking a north–south line called the Fourth Principal Meridian, from which much of the land in the state would be measured. For six days they worked their way through woods and swamps, up what is now the southern part of E and across the valley that is now the Mondeaux Flowage, before continuing north into what is now Price County. The head of the team wrote of the trip:

During four consecutive weeks there was not a dry garment in the party, day or night... we were constantly surrounded and as constantly excoriated by swarms or rather clouds of mosquitoes, and still more troublesome insects ...

On their way through the county, they and other surveyors recorded a forest then dominated by hemlock, yellow birch and sugar maple, with white pine the fourth or sixth most frequent. The mix of tree species then resembled today's Gerstberger Pines grove southeast of Rib Lake.

Logging began in the late 1850s. Loggers came up the rivers and floated white pine logs out in spring and early summer log drives, down the Big Rib River into the Wisconsin River, down the Black River to the south, and west down the Jump and the Yellow River into the Chippewa. Log-drives continued until around 1900, when the easy-to-float white pine was dwindling.

In 1872 and 1873, the Wisconsin Central Railroad built its line up through the forest that would become Medford on its way to Ashland. The Wisconsin Central's financiers were from Boston, and they named stations at Medford, Chelsea and Westboro after towns in Massachusetts. To finance building this line, the U.S. Government gave the railroad half the land, the odd-numbered sections, of a good share of the county. The railroad began to haul out the logs that didn't float well. Most early settlement was along this railroad, with few settlers in the west or east ends of the county even by the 1890s.

In 1875, Taylor County with its current boundaries was carved out of the larger Chippewa, Lincoln and Clark counties and a bit of Marathon, with the county seat at Medford. The county was probably named for Wisconsin's governor at the time, William Robert Taylor. It was initially divided into four towns—Westboro, Chelsea, Medford and Little Black—each stretching the width of the county.

From around 1902 to 1905, the Stanley, Merrill and Phillips Railway built its railroad up the west end of the county through Polley, Gilman, Hannibal and Jump River. In 1902 the Eau Claire, Chippewa Falls, and Northeastern Railroad (better known as Omaha) pushed in from Holcombe through Hannibal to now-abandoned Hughey on the Yellow River. In 1905 the Wisconsin Central Railroad built its line through Clark (now a ghost town), Lublin, Polley, Gilman and Donald, heading for Superior. The SM&P and Omaha were primarily logging railroads, which hauled out lumber and incidentally transported passengers and other cargo. With the lumber gone, the SM&P shut down in 1933.

After the good timber was gone, the lumber companies sold many of the cutover forties to farm families. Initially they tried making their living in various ways: selling milk, eggs, beef and wool, growing cucumbers and peas, and various other schemes. But before long dairy had become the predominant form of agriculture in the county. By 1923 Medford had the second largest co-op creamery in Wisconsin. The number of dairy farms peaked around 3,300 in the early 1940s and had dropped to 1,090 by 1995.

Much of the cut-over north-central part of the county was designated part of the Chequamegon National Forest in 1933. Large chunks of this central and northern part of the county was not good for farming, and lay neglected in the hands of lumber companies after the forest was cut off – largely a tax-delinquent fire hazard. In the early 1930s the federal government agreed to manage the land for the county as National Forest. Soon after, Civilian Conservation Corps camps at Mondeaux, Perkinstown, and near the current Jump River fire tower began to replant parts of that cutover. The CCCs at Mondeaux built the recreation area there. Today hikers can follow the Ice Age National Scenic Trail through the national forest and the northeast corner of the county.

The major early industry was the production of sawlogs, lumber, and shingles. Large sawmills were at Medford and Rib Lake. Medford, Perkinstown and Rib Lake had tanneries, which used local hemlock bark in the tanning process. Whittlesey had an early brickyard. Industry has diversified since, into creameries, window manufacturers, plastics, and food processing – mostly at Medford.

== Geography ==
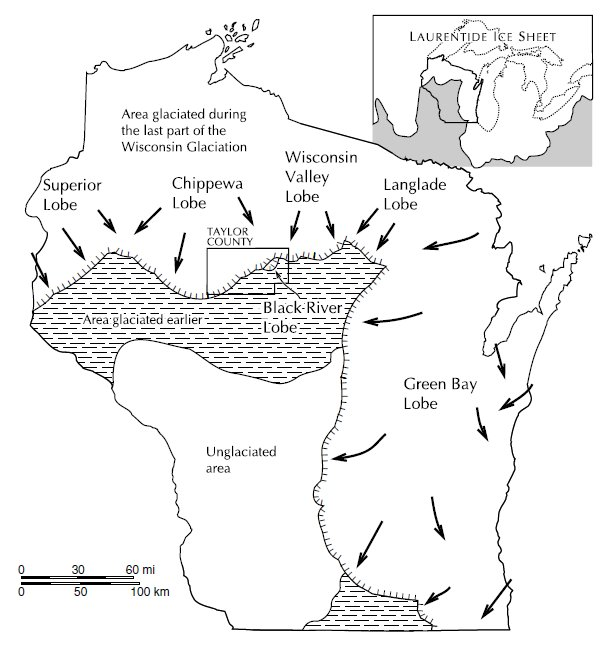
Maximum extent of the Laurentide Ice Sheet

According to the U.S. Census Bureau, the county has a total area of 984 square miles (2,550 km^{2}), of which 975 square miles (2,530 km^{2}) is land and 9.5 square miles (25 km^{2}) (1.0%) is water.

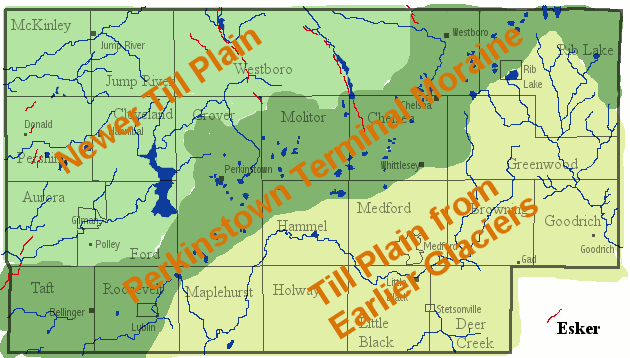
Glacial landforms of Taylor County.

Taylor county's terrain was shaped chiefly by glaciers. Geologists believe that 15,000 to 25,000 years ago the Laurentide Ice Sheet pushed down from Canada across what are now the Great Lakes, and over much of the northern U.S. One of the ice sheet's lobes bulldozed down over two thirds of Taylor county, at its farthest extent covering a line from Westboro through Perkinstown to Lublin. The ice sheet pushed down that far, then melted back, leaving the band of choppy hills and little lakes that cuts diagonally across the county. This band of hills is called the Perkinstown terminal moraine. North and west of the moraine, in the corner of the county toward Jump River, that last glacier left behind a more gently rolling plain of glacial till. The striking glacial features in this area are glacial erratic boulders and eskers. Along with the Mondeaux and Lost Lake eskers, there are others in the towns of Westboro, Pershing, Aurora and Taft. The southeast corner of the county toward Stetsonville and Goodrich was not covered by the last glacier, but was covered by earlier ones. Here too they left glacial till, but the land is generally flatter and less rocky since erosion has had more time to level things.

Beneath the glacial till lies Cambrian and Precambrian bedrock. Outcrops have been exposed in places by the Jump and Yellow Rivers. An unmined copper and gold deposit known as the Bend deposit lies north of Perkinstown, which geologists believe was formed up to two billion years ago by a black smoker, a volcanic vent under an ancient ocean.

The county straddles a divide between three river systems. The Jump River and Yellow flow west into the Chippewa river valley. The Big Rib River flows southeast to the Wisconsin. And the Black River flows out to the south. All eventually feed the Mississippi.

=== Adjacent counties ===
- Price County – north
- Lincoln County – east
- Marathon County – southeast
- Clark County – south
- Chippewa County – west
- Rusk County – northwest

=== National protected area ===
- Chequamegon National Forest (part)

== Demographics ==
Historical population
Census	Pop.	Note	%±
1880	2,311		—
1890	6,731		191.3%
1900	11,262		67.3%
1910	13,641		21.1%
1920	18,045		32.3%
1930	17,685		−2.0%
1940	20,105		13.7%
1950	18,456		−8.2%
1960	17,843		−3.3%
1970	16,958		−5.0%
1980	18,817		11.0%
1990	18,901		0.4%
2000	19,680		4.1%
2010	20,689		5.1%
2020	19,913		−3.8%
2025 (est.)	20,118	▲	1.0%
U.S. Decennial Census; 1790–1960 1900–90; 1990–2000 2010 2020 2025

=== Racial and ethnic composition ===
Taylor County, Wisconsin – Racial and ethnic composition Note: the US Census treats Hispanic/Latino as an ethnic category. This table excludes Latinos from the racial categories and assigns them to a separate category. Hispanics/Latinos may be of any race.
Race / ethnicity (NH = Non-Hispanic)	Pop 1980	Pop 1990	Pop 2000	Pop 2010	Pop 2020	% 1980	% 1990	% 2000	% 2010	% 2020
White alone (NH)	18,676	18,774	19,342	20,110	18,713	99.25%	99.33%	98.28%	97.20%	93.97%
Black or African American alone (NH)	1	2	17	54	64	0.01%	0.01%	0.09%	0.26%	0.32%
Native American or Alaska Native alone (NH)	29	39	37	41	39	0.15%	0.21%	0.19%	0.20%	0.20%
Asian alone (NH)	37	42	46	54	62	0.20%	0.22%	0.23%	0.26%	0.31%
Native Hawaiian or Pacific Islander alone (NH)	x	x	0	8	5	x	x	0.00%	0.04%	0.03%
Other race alone (NH)	18	2	8	1	14	0.10%	0.01%	0.04%	0.00%	0.07%
Mixed race or Multiracial (NH)	x	x	103	105	449	x	x	0.52%	0.51%	2.25%
Hispanic or Latino (any race)	56	42	127	316	567	0.30%	0.22%	0.65%	1.53%	2.85%
Total	18,817	18,901	19,680	20,689	19,913	100.00%	100.00%	100.00%	100.00%	100.00%

=== 2020 census ===
As of the 2020 census, the county had a population of 19,913. The population density was 20.4 people per square mile (7.9 people/km^{2}), with 9,379 housing units at an average density of 9.6 units per square mile (3.7 units/km^{2}).

The median age was 42.9 years; 24.0% of residents were under the age of 18 and 19.3% were 65 years of age or older. For every 100 females there were 102.7 males, and for every 100 females age 18 and over there were 102.5 males age 18 and over.

The racial makeup of the county was 94.8% White, 0.3% Black or African American, 0.2% American Indian and Alaska Native, 0.3% Asian, <0.1% Native Hawaiian and Pacific Islander, 1.3% from some other race, and 3.0% from two or more races. Hispanic or Latino residents of any race comprised 2.8% of the population.

20.7% of residents lived in urban areas, while 79.3% lived in rural areas.

There were 8,132 households in the county, of which 27.3% had children under the age of 18 living in them. Of all households, 52.7% were married-couple households, 20.1% were households with a male householder and no spouse or partner present, and 19.7% were households with a female householder and no spouse or partner present. About 28.7% of all households were made up of individuals and 12.7% had someone living alone who was 65 years of age or older.

There were 9,379 housing units, of which 13.3% were vacant. Among occupied housing units, 78.6% were owner-occupied and 21.4% were renter-occupied. The homeowner vacancy rate was 1.1% and the rental vacancy rate was 6.8%.

=== 2000 census ===
2000 Census Age Pyramid for Taylor County

As of the census of 2000, there were 19,680 people, 7,529 households, and 5,345 families residing in the county. The population density was 20 people per square mile (7.7 people/km^{2}). There were 8,595 housing units at an average density of 9 units per square mile (3.5 units/km^{2}). The racial makeup of the county was 98.71% White, 0.09% Black or African American, 0.19% Native American, 0.23% Asian, 0.19% from other races, and 0.59% from two or more races. 0.65% of the population were Hispanic or Latino of any race. 57.9% were of German, 9.1% Polish, 5.3% American and 5.3% Norwegian ancestry. 96.2% spoke English, 1.7% German and 1.2% Spanish as their first language.

There were 7,529 households, out of which 33.80% had children under the age of 18 living with them, 59.30% were married couples living together, 7.10% had a female householder with no husband present, and 29.00% were non-families. 24.70% of all households were made up of individuals, and 11.20% had someone living alone who was 65 years of age or older. The average household size was 2.58 and the average family size was 3.10.

In the county, the population was spread out, with 27.10% under the age of 18, 7.60% from 18 to 24, 28.30% from 25 to 44, 21.80% from 45 to 64, and 15.20% who were 65 years of age or older. The median age was 37 years. For every 100 females there were 102.60 males. For every 100 females age 18 and over, there were 100.40 males.

In 2017, there were 202 births, giving a general fertility rate of 64.0 births per 1000 women aged 15–44, the 33rd highest rate out of all 72 Wisconsin counties. Additionally, there were fewer than five reported induced abortions performed on women of Taylor County residence in 2017.

== Transportation ==
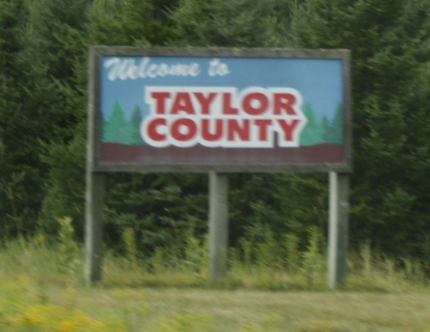
Welcome sign on STH 13

The state of Wisconsin has jurisdiction over 120 miles (190 km) of state highways in Taylor County, including STH-13, STH-64, STH-73, STH-97, and STH-102. STH-13 runs north–south through the eastern half of the county and STH-73 is the major north–south highway in the western half of the county. STH-64 is the major highway running east–west through Taylor county. Through a contractual agreement with the state, the Taylor County Highway Department is responsible for maintenance of state highways and right-of-ways.

A network of 250 miles (400 km) of county highways serves Taylor County's rural areas. Major east–west highways include CTH-A, CTH-D, CTH-M, and CTH-O. Major north–south routes include CTH-C, CTH-E, and CTH-H.

Towns in Taylor County are responsible for the maintenance and upkeep of their individual town roads.

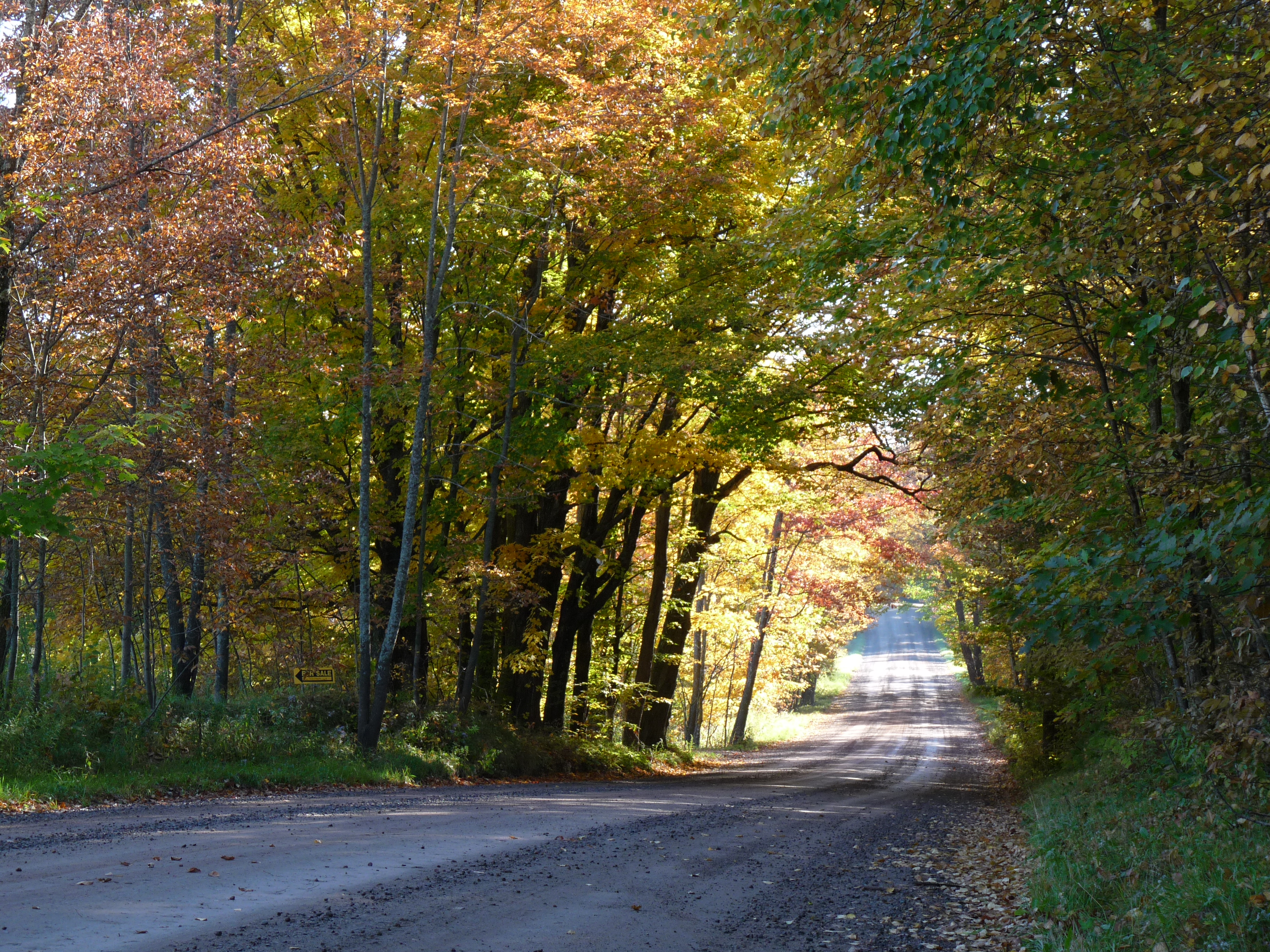
Rustic Road 1, north of Rib Lake

The county has one designated Rustic Road, Rustic Road 1 located in the Town of Rib Lake. Dedicated in 1975, this 5-mile-long (8.0 km) gravel road between STH-102 and CTH-D near Rib Lake was the first Rustic Road in Wisconsin. It winds over wooded hills and valleys created by glaciers nearly 12,000 years ago. A historical marker alongside the road (at Hwy 102 and RR1) commemorates the designation.

=== Major highways ===
- Highway 13 (Wisconsin)
- Highway 64 (Wisconsin)
- Highway 73 (Wisconsin)
- Highway 97 (Wisconsin)
- Highway 102 (Wisconsin)

=== Railroads ===
- Canadian National
- Watco

=== Airports ===
- KMDZ – Taylor County

The primary airport in the county is the Taylor County Airport (KMDZ). There are six other private landing strips in the county. Located approximately three miles southeast of Medford, the Taylor County Airport is the only public airport. The airport handles approximately 7,000 operations per year, with roughly 93% general aviation and 7% air taxi. The airport has a 6,000-foot asphalt runway with approved GPS approaches (Runway 9-27) and a 4,435-foot asphalt crosswind runway, also with GPS approaches, (Runway 16–34). Services provided include: Jet A fuel, 100 low-lead AV gas, 24-hour fuel service, car rental, taxi service, large ramp/tie down area, flight instruction, and computerized weather briefing/flight planning service. An automated weather observation system (AWOS) is in place.

Location	Airport name	Status	Location
Roosevelt	Baldez Field	Private	T .30N-R.3W Sec.2
Goodrich	Charlie's Field	Private	T.31N-R.3E Sec. 19
Aurora	East Gilman Field	Private	T.31N-R.3W Sec. 18
Browning	Lee's Flight Park	Private	T.31N-R.2E Sec 2
Medford	Memorial Hospital of Taylor Co. Heliport	Private	T.31N-R.1E Sec. 28
Little Black	Taylor County Airport	Public	T.30N-R.2E Sec. 7
Goodrich	John's Field	Private	T.31N-R.3E Sec. 24

== Communities ==
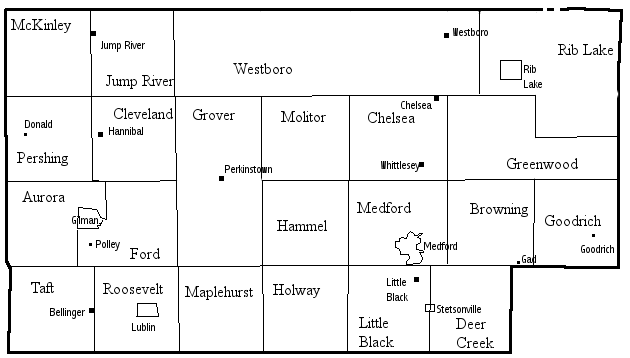
Taylor County: cities, villages, towns, etc.

=== City ===
- Medford (county seat)

=== Villages ===
- Gilman
- Lublin
- Rib Lake
- Stetsonville

=== Towns ===
- Aurora
- Browning
- Chelsea
- Cleveland
- Deer Creek
- Ford
- Goodrich
- Greenwood
- Grover
- Hammel
- Holway
- Jump River
- Little Black
- Maplehurst
- McKinley
- Medford
- Molitor
- Pershing
- Rib Lake
- Roosevelt
- Taft
- Westboro

=== Census-designated places ===
- Chelsea
- Jump River
- Westboro
- Whittlesey

=== Unincorporated communities ===
- Bellinger
- Gad (partial)
- Goodrich
- Hannibal
- Little Black
- Murat
- Perkinstown
- Polley
- Queenstown

=== Ghost towns ===
- Donald
- Field
- Hughey
- Interwald
- Maplehurst

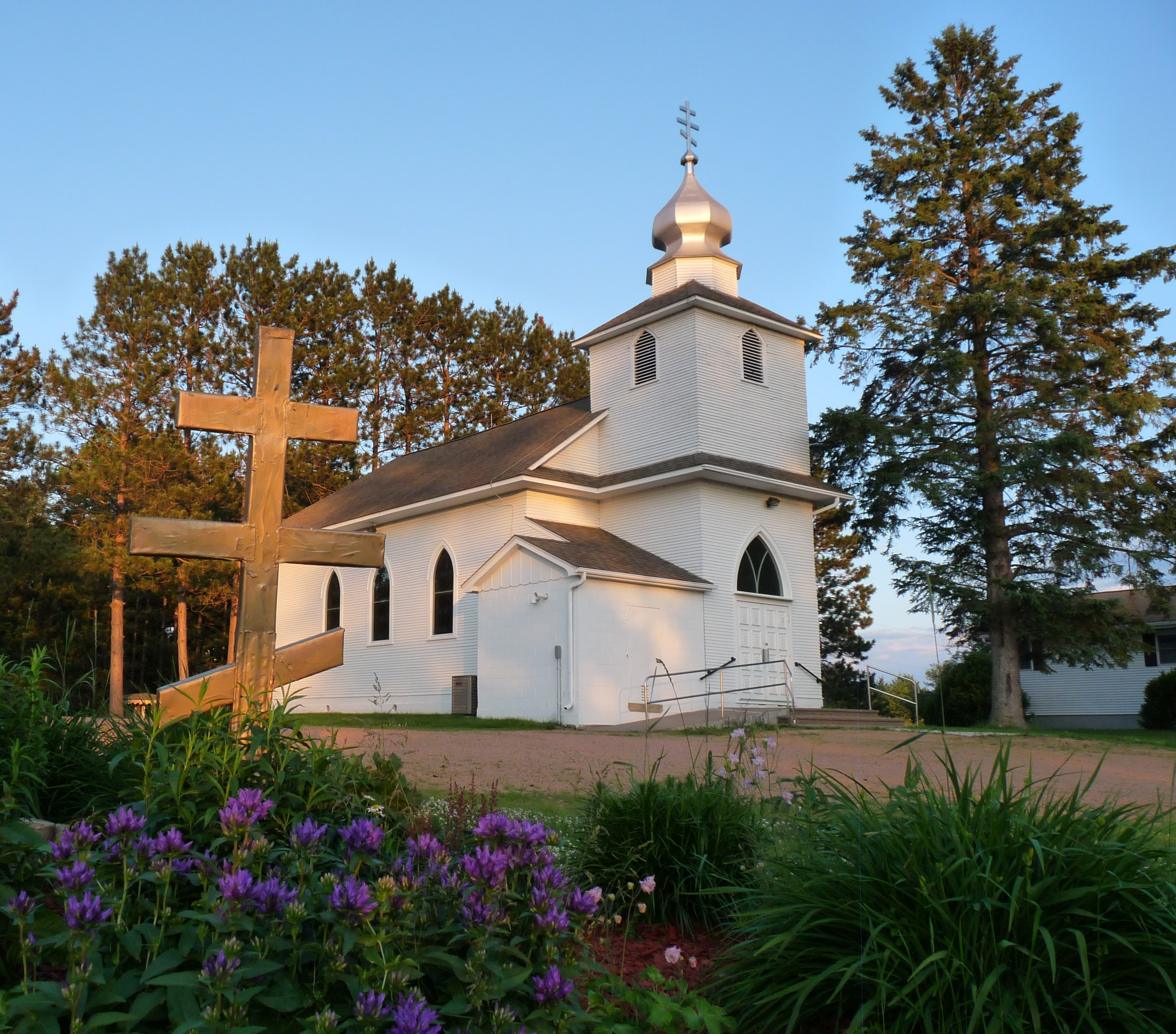
Pictured is Holy Assumption Church in Lublin, one of a handful of Orthodox churches in Wisconsin.

== Population ==
The southwest corner of the county was settled largely by Polish and other eastern-European immigrants.

Taylor County experienced a population decrease between 1950 and 1970, but since 1970 the county has gained 2,722 people.

Area	1950	1960	1970	1980	1990	2000	Numeric change, 1950–2000	January 1, 2006, estimate
T. Aurora	564	563	466	461	473	386	−178	375
T. Browning	630	630	644	702	740	850	220	889
T. Chelsea	603	566	554	677	731	719	116	754
T. Cleveland	458	358	250	286	235	262	−196	272
T. Deer Creek	780	810	764	747	738	733	−47	750
T. Ford	334	306	248	274	254	276	−58	271
T. Goodrich	460	414	373	408	454	487	27	497
T. Greenwood	758	653	635	705	634	642	−116	672
T. Grover	266	232	210	229	214	233	−33	239
T. Hammel	516	526	509	562	633	735	219	749
T. Holway	834	859	837	903	779	854	20	879
T. Jump River	448	391	355	365	330	311	−137	317
T. Little Black	1,216	1,182	1,133	1,169	1,195	1,148	−68	1,187
T. McKinley	570	491	461	416	403	418	−152	440
T. Maplehurst	462	405	348	345	300	359	−103	364
T. Medford	1,661	1,622	1,546	1,834	1,962	2,216	555	2,253
T. Molitor	200	168	199	212	183	263	63	269
T. Pershing	418	358	295	276	217	180	−238	181
T. Rib Lake	769	657	615	682	746	768	−1	775
T.Roosevelt	678	602	518	491	429	444	−234	446
T. Taft	499	418	355	347	367	361	−138	380
T. Westboro	783	720	631	706	663	660	−123	699
V. Gilman	402	379	328	436	412	474	72	460
V. Lublin	161	160	143	142	129	110	−51	100
V. Rib Lake	853	794	782	945	887	878	25	878
V. Stetsonville	334	319	305	487	511	563	229	563
C. Medford	2,799	3,260	3,454	4,010	4,282	4,350	1,551	4,260
Taylor County	18,456	17,843	16,958	18,817	18,901	19,680	1,224	19,917

== Politics ==
Taylor County has leaned Republican since 1980, although Bill Clinton carried it narrowly in 1996 due to high third-party performance, and Barack Obama lost it by only 23 votes in 2008, mirroring the statewide leftward shift in that election. Since then, the Republican strength in the county has increased in every election; in 2024, Republican Donald Trump received a record-setting 73% of the vote.

United States presidential election results for Taylor County, Wisconsin
Year	Republican		Democratic		Third party(ies)	
Year	No.	%	No.	%	No.	%
1892	734	43.20%	904	53.21%	61	3.59%
1896	1,387	64.51%	710	33.02%	53	2.47%
1900	1,420	57.51%	1,012	40.99%	37	1.50%
1904	1,725	67.81%	728	28.62%	91	3.58%
1908	1,627	60.80%	924	34.53%	125	4.67%
1912	773	33.81%	821	35.91%	692	30.27%
1916	1,544	60.22%	845	32.96%	175	6.83%
1920	2,707	72.69%	282	7.57%	735	19.74%
1924	1,389	29.49%	185	3.93%	3,136	66.58%
1928	2,648	54.61%	2,095	43.20%	106	2.19%
1932	1,107	18.61%	4,219	70.94%	621	10.44%
1936	1,758	25.15%	4,721	67.55%	510	7.30%
1940	3,668	47.77%	3,771	49.11%	239	3.11%
1944	3,194	48.24%	3,215	48.56%	212	3.20%
1948	2,579	42.11%	3,184	51.99%	361	5.89%
1952	4,892	63.45%	2,768	35.90%	50	0.65%
1956	3,843	57.75%	2,759	41.46%	52	0.78%
1960	3,447	47.63%	3,768	52.07%	22	0.30%
1964	2,261	32.78%	4,624	67.03%	13	0.19%
1968	3,043	43.96%	2,910	42.04%	969	14.00%
1972	4,125	55.87%	2,934	39.74%	324	4.39%
1976	3,591	45.45%	4,101	51.90%	209	2.65%
1980	4,596	51.31%	3,739	41.74%	623	6.95%
1984	4,918	59.48%	3,271	39.56%	80	0.97%
1988	4,254	52.52%	3,785	46.73%	61	0.75%
1992	3,415	36.49%	3,305	35.31%	2,639	28.20%
1996	3,108	39.18%	3,253	41.01%	1,571	19.81%
2000	5,278	58.70%	3,254	36.19%	460	5.12%
2004	5,582	58.49%	3,829	40.12%	132	1.38%
2008	4,586	49.07%	4,563	48.82%	197	2.11%
2012	5,601	58.88%	3,763	39.56%	148	1.56%
2016	6,579	69.46%	2,393	25.27%	499	5.27%
2020	7,657	71.65%	2,693	25.20%	336	3.14%
2024	8,209	73.39%	2,823	25.24%	154	1.38%

== See also ==
- List of Taylor County lakes
- National Register of Historic Places listings in Taylor County, Wisconsin
- Pine Line Trail
