= Deer Creek, Taylor County, Wisconsin =

Deer Creek, Wisconsin
- Town
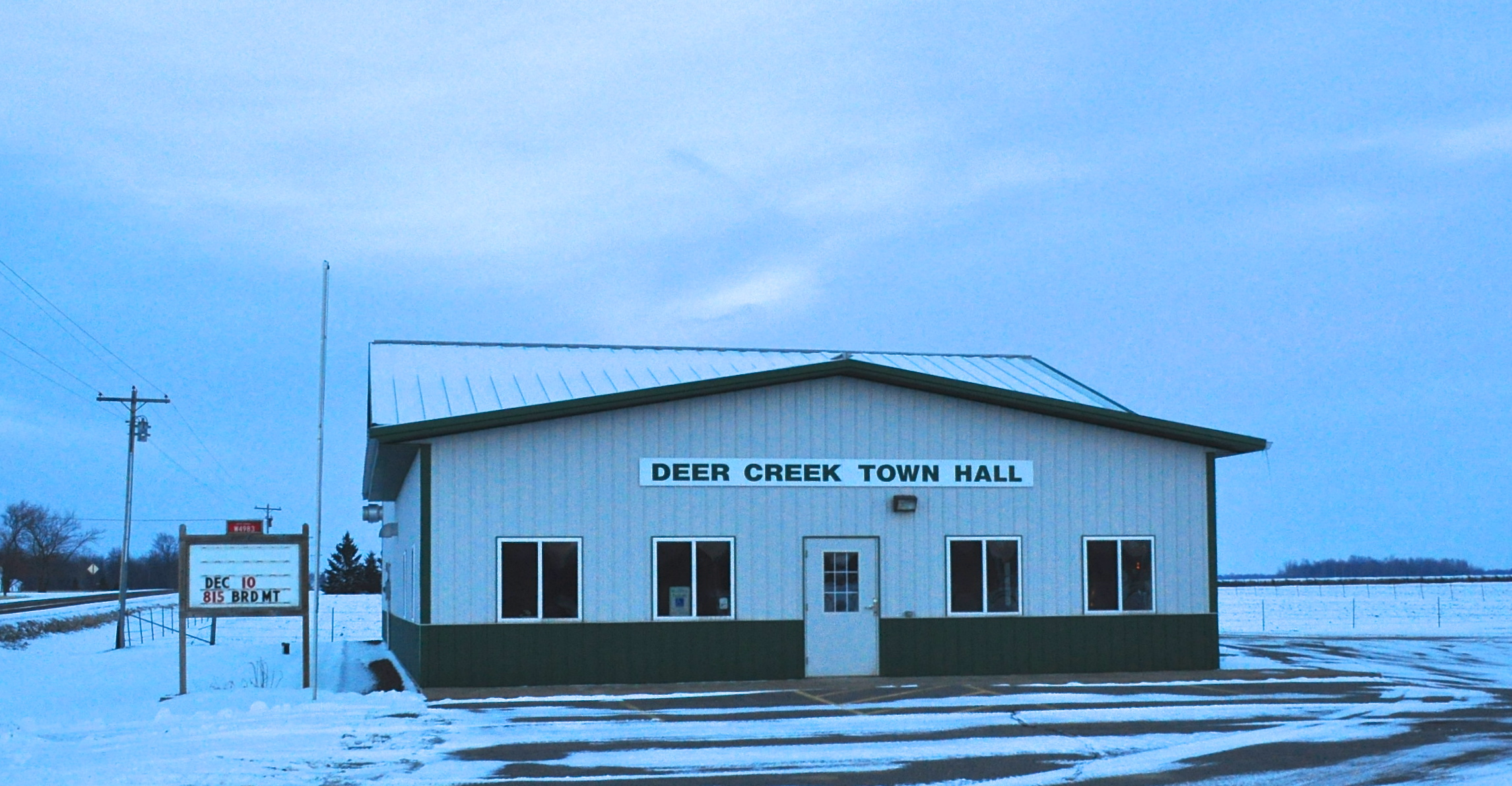
- Deer Creek Town Hall in November 2013.

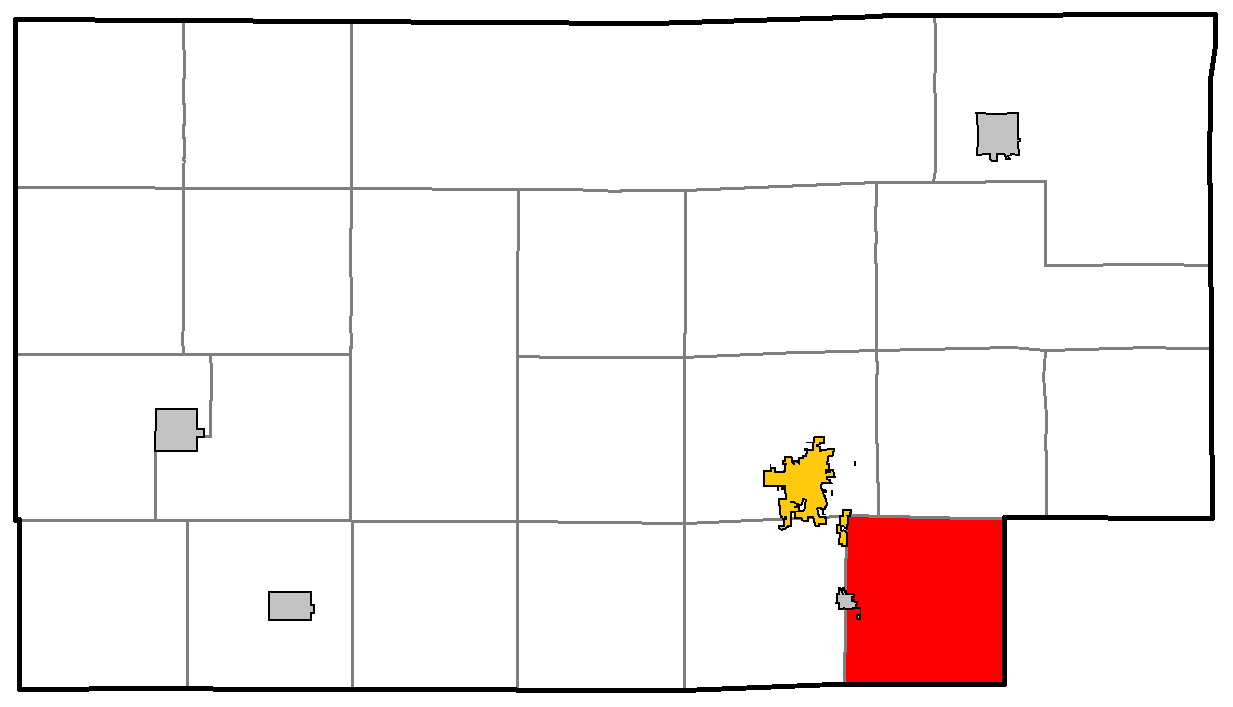
- Location of Deer Creek, within Taylor County

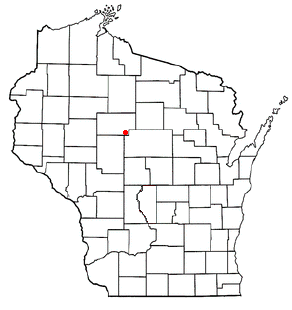
- Location of Deer Creek, Taylor County, Wisconsin
- Coordinates: 45°4′3″N 90°15′54″W
- Country: United States
- State: Wisconsin
- County: Taylor

Area
  - Total: 34.2 sq mi (88.7 km^{2})
  - Land: 34.2 sq mi (88.6 km^{2})
  - Water: 0 sq mi (0.0 km^{2})
- Elevation: 1,457 ft (444 m)

Population (2020)
  - Total: 677
  - Density: 19.8/sq mi (7.64/km^{2})
- Time zone: UTC-6 (Central (CST))
  - Summer (DST): UTC-5 (CDT)
- Area codes: 715 & 534
- FIPS code: 55-19225
- GNIS feature ID: 1583059
- PLSS township: T30N R2E

Deer Creek is a town in Taylor County, Wisconsin, United States. The village of Stetsonville lies partly in the town, straddling its west border with Little Black. The population was 677 at the 2020 census.

== Geography ==
According to the United States Census Bureau, the town has a total area of 34.2 square miles (88.7 km^{2}), of which 34.2 square miles (88.6 km^{2}) is land and 0.03% is water.

Other than the banks of streams, the surface of the town is fairly level, laid down by some unknown glacier and eroded long before the last glacier which bulldozed the sharp Perkinstown terminal moraine to the north. The soil of the northwestern and northeastern corners of Deer Creek are considered to be primarily Merrill till, and the rest (majority) is Edgar till.

== History ==
The six by six mile square that would become Deer Creek was first surveyed in 1851 by crews working for the U.S. government. In the fall of 1854 a different crew of surveyors marked all the section corners in the township, walking through the woods and swamps, measuring with chain and compass. When done, the deputy surveyor filed this general description:

This Township contains a large number of Swamps, all of which are unfit for cultivation. The lands is nearly all unfit for farming purposes, the soil being very poor and in most places the stone and gravel comes to the surface. The Timber is of poor quality, being mostly Hemlock & Birch. Where the land is rolling, the timber is Sugar Lind? and Elm.

There is no Pine worth any thing in the Township. It is well watered by small streams, but none of them are of sufficient size for milling purposes.

Around 1873 the Wisconsin Central Railroad Company built its line up through the forest just west of what would become Deer Creek, heading for Medford and eventually Ashland. This opened up the nearby lands to settlers. To finance this undertaking, the railroad was granted half the land for eighteen miles on either side of the track laid - generally the odd-numbered sections.

An 1880 map of this area shows a wagon road following the course of modern highway 13 for the north five miles of what would become Deer Creek, a predecessor of Apple Avenue spanning the full six miles across the north, and a predecessor of County A reaching four miles east of Stetsonville. A farm with the name A.J. Cliveland is marked in section 26.

A map from around 1900 shows the town filling in with settlers. Some sort of road follows most of the course of modern Highway 13 up the west edge of the town, and a mile to the east one follows the course of Oriole Drive. Other east-west wagon roads cover most of the section lines except for Pine Ave. Many north-south connector roads were also in. Settler homesteads were sprinkled along all these roads, with 40 and 80 acres the most common farm sizes. The town hall was a mile east of Stetsonville. Two rural schools were marked on what would become Elm Avenue, one in section 36, and one on what would become CTH A four miles east of Stetsonville. A sawmill was marked in section 26 and in the northwest corner of the town along the Little Black was the "Poor Farm." The Wisconsin Central still owned large chunks of the odd sections, especially on the east side of the town.

The 1911 plat map shows more settlers. More roads had been connected. Another school had appeared two miles east of Stetsonville, and another up on what would become Apple Avenue. There were still large blocks without settlers, particularly in the east and south.

== Demographics ==
As of the census of 2000, there were 733 people, 241 households, and 201 families residing in the town. The population density was 21.4 people per square mile (8.3/km^{2}). There were 253 housing units at an average density of 7.4 per square mile (2.9/km^{2}). The racial makeup of the town was 98.50% White, and 1.50% from two or more races. Hispanic or Latino of any race were 2.59% of the population.

There were 241 households, out of which 44.4% had children under the age of 18 living with them, 73.9% were married couples living together, 4.1% had a female householder with no husband present, and 16.2% were non-families. 12.9% of all households were made up of individuals, and 5.0% had someone living alone who was 65 years of age or older. The average household size was 3.04 and the average family size was 3.34.

In the town, the population was spread out, with 31.7% under the age of 18, 6.5% from 18 to 24, 30.2% from 25 to 44, 22.5% from 45 to 64, and 9.1% who were 65 years of age or older. The median age was 34 years. For every 100 females, there were 108.2 males. For every 100 females age 18 and over, there were 110.5 males.

The median income for a household in the town was $49,688, and the median income for a family was $51,607. Males had a median income of $30,938 versus $21,500 for females. The per capita income for the town was $18,503. About 6.0% of families and 7.7% of the population were below the poverty line, including 9.2% of those under age 18 and none of those age 65 or over.
