= Jack Creek =

Jack Creek, Jacks Creek, or Jack's Creek may refer to:

== Populated places ==
In the United States

- Jack Creek Township, Emmet County, Iowa
- Jacks Creek, Kentucky, an unincorporated community in Floyd County
- Jack Creek, Nevada, an unincorporated community
- Jacks Creek, Tennessee, an unincorporated community in Chester County

== Waterways ==
In the United States

- Jack Creek (Florida), a water conservation area and park in Highlands County
- Jacks Creek (Apalachee River tributary), a stream in Walton County, Georgia
- Jacks Creek (Bruneau River), a stream in Idaho
- Jack Creek (Des Moines River), a river in Minnesota
- Jack Creek (Buck Creek), a river in Missouri
- Jack Creek (Harrington Creek), a stream in Elko County, Nevada
- Jack Creek (Jarbidge River), a stream in Elko County, Nevada
- Jacks Creek (Pennsylvania), a tributary of the Juniata River
- Jack Creek (South Dakota), a stream in South Dakota

Elsewhere

- Jack Creek (Nipissing District), in Nipissing District, Ontario, Canada

== Other ==
- Jack's Creek Covered Bridge, Patrick County, Virginia
- Jacks Creek (album), an album by Sun City Girls

== See also ==
- Big Jacks Creek, a stream in Idaho
