= Ford, Wisconsin =

- Town
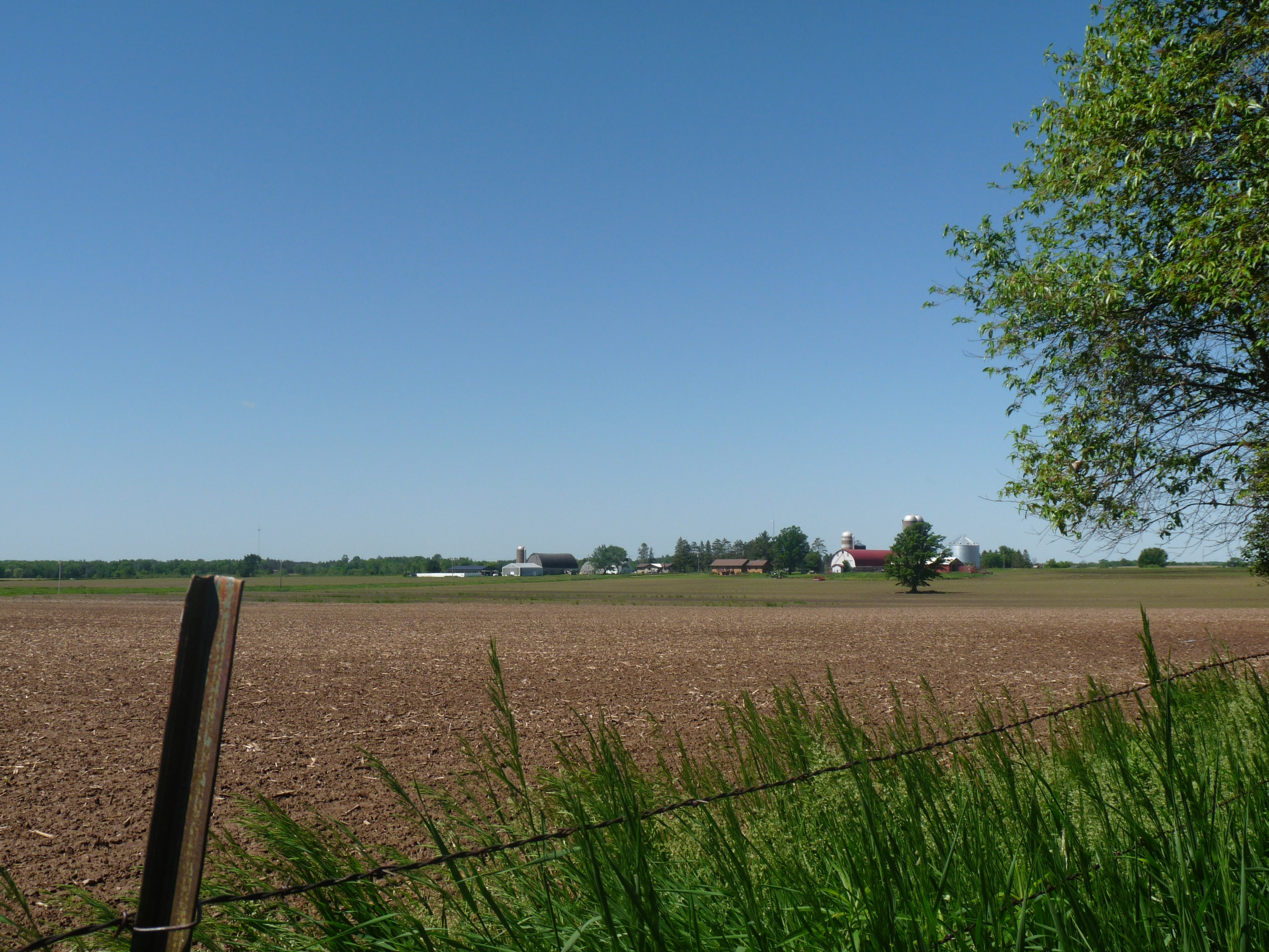
- Farms in Ford

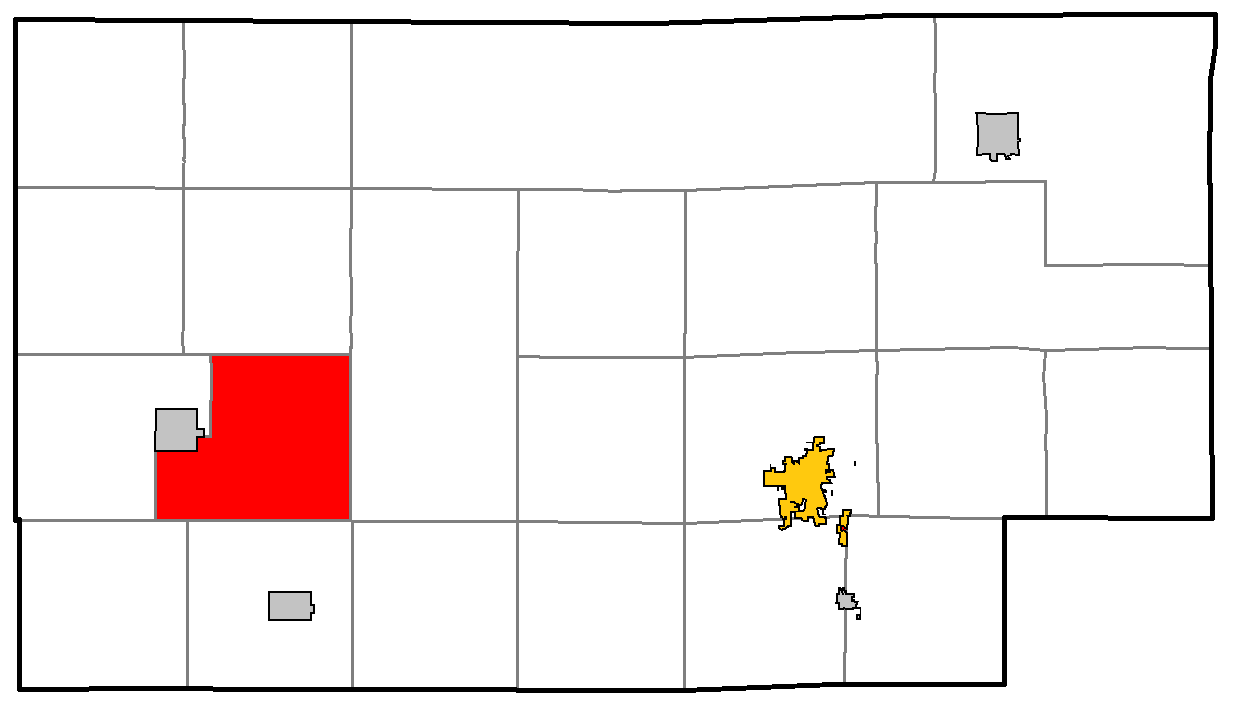
- Location of Ford, within Taylor County

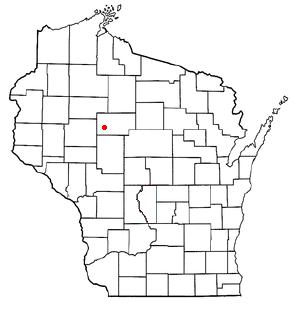
- Location of Ford, Wisconsin
- Coordinates: 45°9′41″N 90°45′40″W
- Country: United States
- State: Wisconsin
- County: Taylor

Area
  - Total: 35.1 sq mi (90.8 km^{2})
  - Land: 32.8 sq mi (84.9 km^{2})
  - Water: 2.3 sq mi (6.0 km^{2})
- Elevation: 1,260 ft (384 m)

Population (2020)
  - Total: 265
  - Density: 8.08/sq mi (3.12/km^{2})
- Time zone: UTC-6 (Central (CST))
  - Summer (DST): UTC-5 (CDT)
- Area codes: 715 & 534
- FIPS code: 55-26425
- GNIS feature ID: 1583212
- PLSS township: T31N R3W, roughly

Ford is a town in Taylor County, Wisconsin, United States. The population was 265 at the 2020 census. The unincorporated community of Polley is located in the town.

== Geography ==
According to the United States Census Bureau, the town has a total area of 35.1 square miles (90.8 km^{2}), of which 32.8 square miles (84.8 km^{2}) is land and 2.3 square miles (6.0 km^{2}) (6.59%) is water. Chequamegon Waters, also known as Miller Dam, is a man-made lake that covers the northeast corner of Ford.

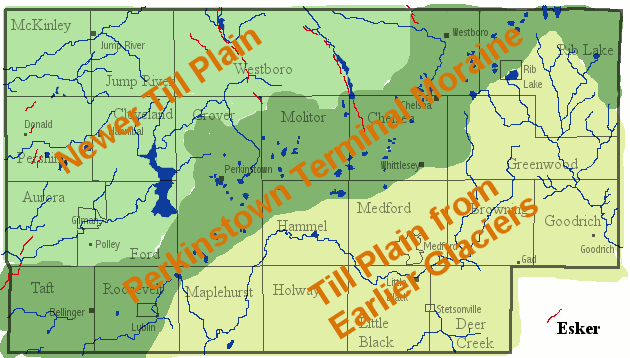
Glacial landforms of Taylor County.

Most of Ford's soil is silt loam with a heavy subsoil. The southeastern corner of the town lies in the hilly terminal moraine that runs from Westboro through Perkinstown and Lublin - dumped by the last glacier. The rest of Ford is the flatter till plain left by the same glacier. The Yellow River and Hay Creek have cut channels through that flatter area. Beneath the glacial till, most of Ford's bedrock is volcanogenic metasedimentary rock, with smaller areas of amphibolite and sandstone.

== History ==
In mid-summer of 1847 a crew working for the U.S. government surveyed a six-mile square which approximates the current boundaries of Ford. Then in October 1854 another crew marked all the section corners in the township, walking through the woods and swamps, measuring with chain and compass. When done, the deputy surveyor filed this general description:

This Township contains numerous swamps some of which are of considerable extent they are all unfit for cultivation. The surface is Generally level the low Hemlock lands the soil is 3d rate the uplands 2d. The whole of the Township is covered with Timber and is chiefly composed of Hemlock and Y Birch. The River Enters the Township Near the NW corner of section 1 and flows in a south westerly course with a swift current and has a good motive power for mills. There is no improvements on this Township. The Hemlock and Swamps Except Alder area covered with moss(?).

An 1880 map of the area shows a "winter road" from Chippewa County loosely paralleling the Yellow River on the north side. This tote road extended through the wilderness all the way to what would become Westboro. It was used to ferry supplies to equip logging camps for the winter logging season. During this phase the loggers focused on cutting white pine - the most valuable tree - floating the logs down the Yellow in spring log drives. This map also shows "Dam built 1871" at the location of Miller Dam.

In 1902 and 1903 the Stanley, Merrill and Phillips Railroad was built up the west edge of Ford, heading north from Stanley toward Jump River and beyond. Around 1905 the J.S. Owen Company built a line for the Wisconsin Central heading northwest across the town for Ladysmith and Superior, crossing the SM&P line two miles south of the Yellow River. At this auspicious junction, the hamlet of Polley sprang up, growing to include a 40-man sawmill, a hotel-saloon, a general store, a school, a barber, a cheese factory, a millinery shop, and a newspaper. The community was originally called Morehouse after the road superintendent, while the SM&P called their railway station Lusk after the sawmill owner. In 1909 the USPS established a post office there named Polley for logger and postmaster James Polley. As years rolled on, some businesses moved two miles north to Gilman, the SM&P shut down in the 1930s, and Polley dwindled until today only a bar and some homes remain.

The 1911 plat map of the six mile square that would become most of Ford shows the railroads, with Gilman where the SM&P crosses the Yellow River. The rural lands to the east are mostly owned by lumber companies, with the Northwestern Lumber Co. holding the lion's share. Some smaller parcels are owned by Nye, Lusk and Hudson, the local mill at Polley. Some chunks in the south are owned by the American Immigration Co. The map shows not a single settler in this 6-mile square, though the same series of maps from 1911 shows a smattering of settlers around Jump River, around Hannibal, west of Gilman, and a good number around Lublin. Ford was rather late to be settled.

In 1933 the cut-over eastern half of Ford was designated part of the Chequamegon National Forest

The SM&P Railway ceased operations in the 1930s, but the Wisconsin Central line ended up acquired by the Canadian National Railway, and runs to this day.

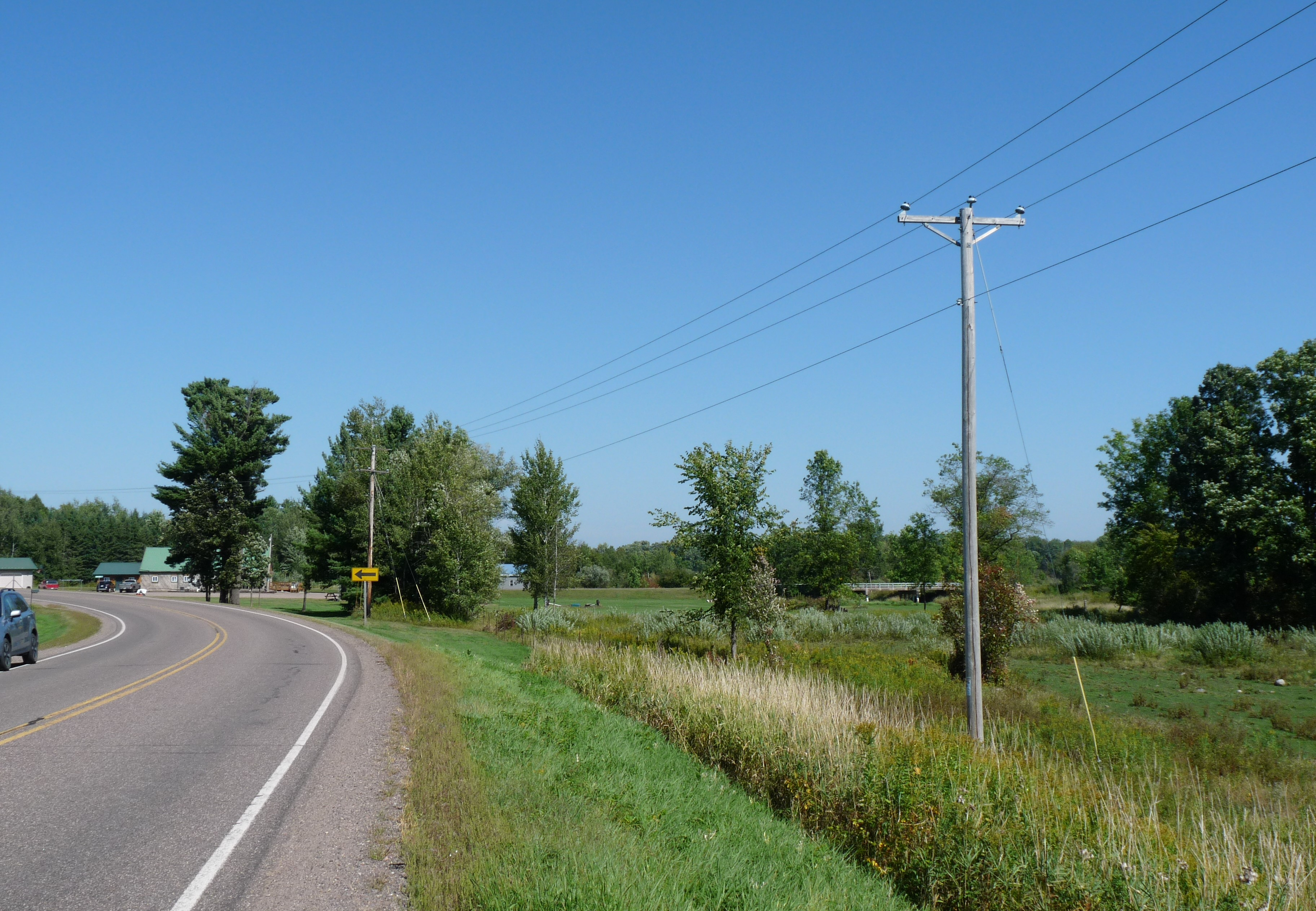
Little remains of Polley, two miles south of Gilman.

== Demographics ==
As of the census of 2000, there were 276 people, 96 households, and 81 families residing in the town. The population density was 8.4 people per square mile (3.3/km^{2}). There were 103 housing units at an average density of 3.1 per square mile (1.2/km^{2}). The racial makeup of the town was 99.64% White and 0.36% from other races. Hispanic or Latino of any race were 0.36% of the population.

There were 96 households, out of which 39.6% had children under the age of 18 living with them, 64.6% were married couples living together, 13.5% had a female householder with no husband present, and 14.6% were non-families. 12.5% of all households were made up of individuals, and 7.3% had someone living alone who was 65 years of age or older. The average household size was 2.88 and the average family size was 3.09.

In the town, the population was spread out, with 26.8% under the age of 18, 7.6% from 18 to 24, 29.0% from 25 to 44, 24.3% from 45 to 64, and 12.3% who were 65 years of age or older. The median age was 37 years. For every 100 females, there were 112.3 males. For every 100 females age 18 and over, there were 110.4 males.

The median income for a household in the town was $37,813, and the median income for a family was $38,750. Males had a median income of $26,042 versus $21,042 for females. The per capita income for the town was $15,624. About 14.1% of families and 19.5% of the population were below the poverty line, including 18.1% of those under the age of eighteen and 30.4% of those 65 or over.
