= Cleveland, Taylor County, Wisconsin =

Cleveland, Wisconsin
- Town
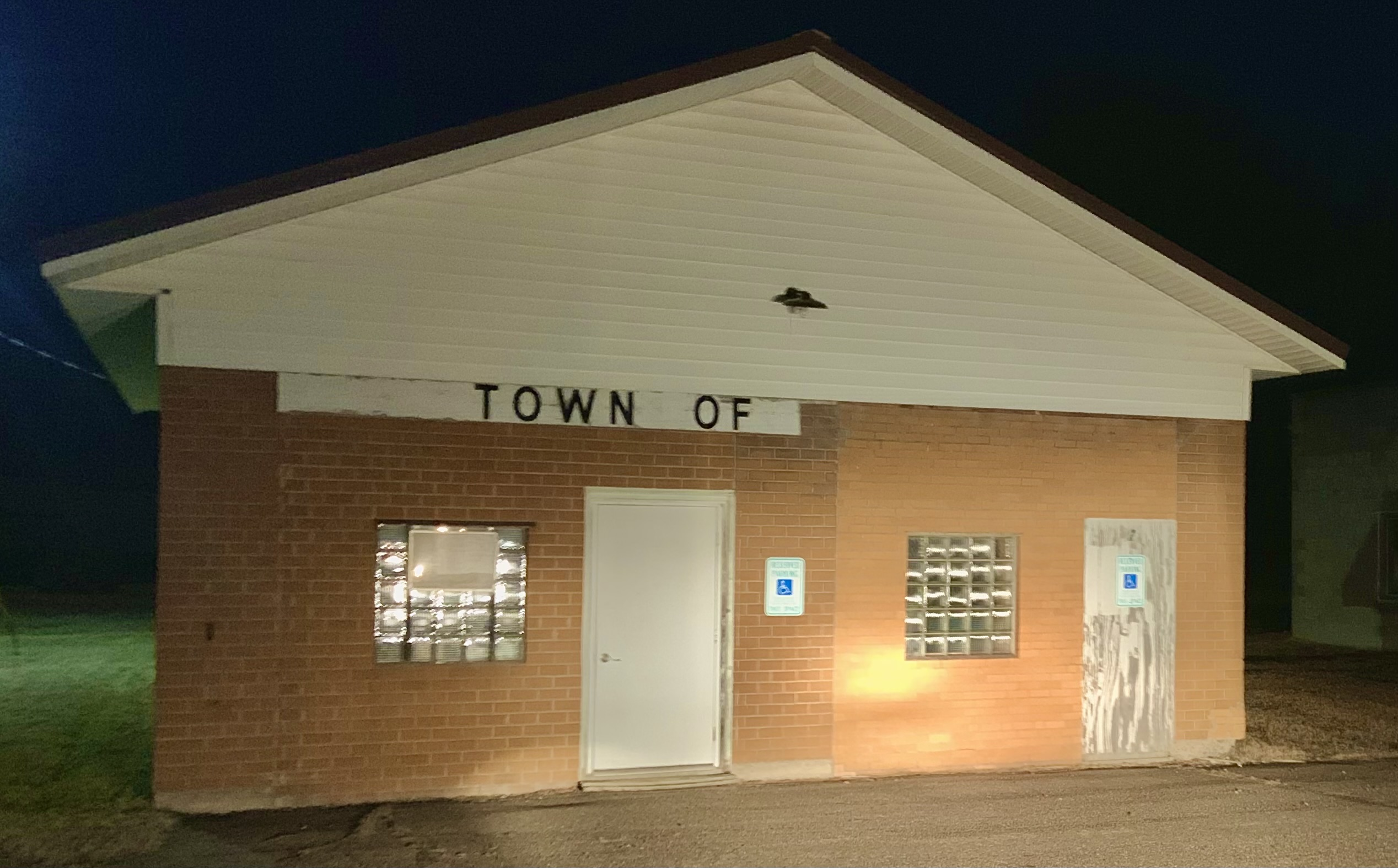
- Town hall

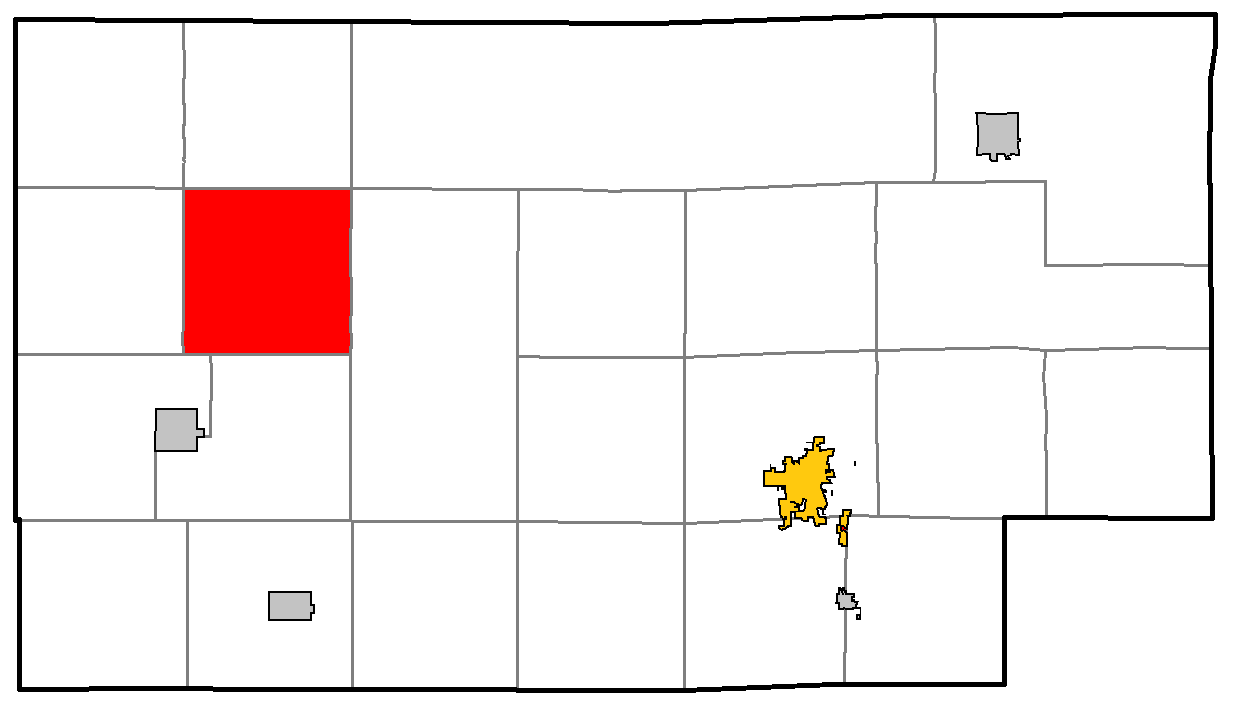
- Location of Cleveland, within Taylor County

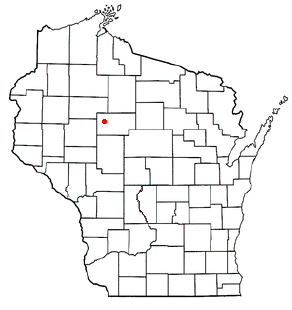
- Location of Cleveland, Wisconsin
- Coordinates: 45°14′39″N 90°43′34″W
- Country: United States
- State: Wisconsin
- County: Taylor

Area
  - Total: 35.7 sq mi (92.4 km^{2})
  - Land: 33.9 sq mi (87.7 km^{2})
  - Water: 1.8 sq mi (4.7 km^{2})
- Elevation: 1,280 ft (390 m)

Population (2020)
  - Total: 216
  - Density: 6.38/sq mi (2.46/km^{2})
- Time zone: UTC-6 (Central (CST))
  - Summer (DST): UTC-5 (CDT)
- Area codes: 715 & 534
- FIPS code: 55-15450
- GNIS feature ID: 1582978
- PLSS township: T32N R3W

See Cleveland (disambiguation)

Cleveland is a town in Taylor County, Wisconsin, United States. The population was 216 at the 2020 census. The unincorporated community of Hannibal is located in the town.

== Geography ==
According to the United States Census Bureau, the town has a total area of 35.7 square miles (92.4 km^{2}), of which 33.9 square miles (87.7 km^{2}) is land and 1.8 square miles (4.7 km^{2}) (5.07%) is water.

Most of the water area is Chequamegon Waters, also known as Miller Dam, a man-made lake in the southeastern corner of the town.

== History ==
The six mile square that would become Cleveland was first surveyed in 1847 by a crew working for the U.S. government. Then in 1854 another crew marked all the section corners in the township, walking through the woods and slogging through the swamps on foot, measuring with chain and compass. When done, the deputy surveyor filed this general description:

The Township contains several swamps. All(?) are unfit for cultivation. The Meadow and Alder bottoms are all subject to be overflowed to a depth of 1 too 2 feet and are good for hay. The surface is Generally low and level apart is upland where the soil is 2d rate. This Township is heavily Timbered and is chiefly composed of Hemlock Y. Birch W. Pine and Balsam. The undergrowth is generally thick and is composed of Hemlock Hazel and Balsam. Balsam and elm(?) line the margins of the meadow and Alder bottoms. The River enters the Township near the center of its East Boundary and flows in a Southerly and South-Westerly course with a switft current and is from 1 too 3 feet deep in a low Stage of water and is adapted to the forming of a good motive power for mills. There is no improvements in this Township.

The east end of Cleveland was logged at least by the early 1860s, when George Judson built a dam on the Yellow River near Hughey and started a pine logging camp nearby, on the east side of the township.

In 1903 the Stanley, Merrill and Phillips Railway built its line up the west side of the town, generally running a little west of the present Highway 73. That same year the Eau Claire, Chippewa Falls, and Northeastern Railway (a.k.a. Omaha) built its line across the township, from Hannibal east to Hughey on the Yellow River. Logs were floated down the Yellow and loaded on railcars at Hughey to be shipped out. Hannibal grew at the junction of the two rail lines.

The 1911 plat map of the six mile square that would become Cleveland shows the two railroads in place, with Hannibal just north of their junction. Some sort of road follows the course of modern County M into Hannibal from the west. Another road follows the course of modern highway 73 toward Jump River to the north, but continues only a mile south - then turns to follow modern County M east toward Perkinstown. The map shows five settlers in the country within a mile of Hannibal. The rest of the township is mostly owned by lumber companies, with the Northwestern Lumber Company owning the most land. Chequamegon Waters does not yet exist, with just the Yellow River flowing through that area.

In 1933 much of the cut-over east half of Cleveland was designated part of the Chequamegon National Forest Bear Creek Hemlocks is a State Natural Area in the north east corner of Cleveland on the border with the town of Jump River, which includes two stands of old-growth hemlock. Part of the Pershing Wildlife Area occupies a thousand acres in the northwest part of the town. The remainder of the town is privately owned—mostly farms, homes and wild land.

== Demographics ==
As of the census of 2000, there were 262 people, 98 households, and 72 families residing in the town. The population density was 7.7 people per square mile (3.0/km^{2}). There were 120 housing units at an average density of 3.5 per square mile (1.4/km^{2}). The racial makeup of the town was 100.00% White.

There were 98 households, out of which 32.7% had children under the age of 18 living with them, 67.3% were married couples living together, 2.0% had a female householder with no husband present, and 26.5% were non-families. 23.5% of all households were made up of individuals, and 11.2% had someone living alone who was 65 years of age or older. The average household size was 2.67 and the average family size was 3.17.

In the town, the population was spread out, with 30.2% under the age of 18, 3.4% from 18 to 24, 26.3% from 25 to 44, 23.3% from 45 to 64, and 16.8% who were 65 years of age or older. The median age was 39 years. For every 100 females, there were 106.3 males. For every 100 females age 18 and over, there were 120.5 males.

The median income for a household in the town was $35,625, and the median income for a family was $39,375. Males had a median income of $29,167 versus $25,179 for females. The per capita income for the town was $16,452. About 8.2% of families and 10.9% of the population were below the poverty line, including 13.6% of those under the age of eighteen and 8.0% of those 65 or over.
