= Grover, Taylor County, Wisconsin =

Grover, Wisconsin
- Town
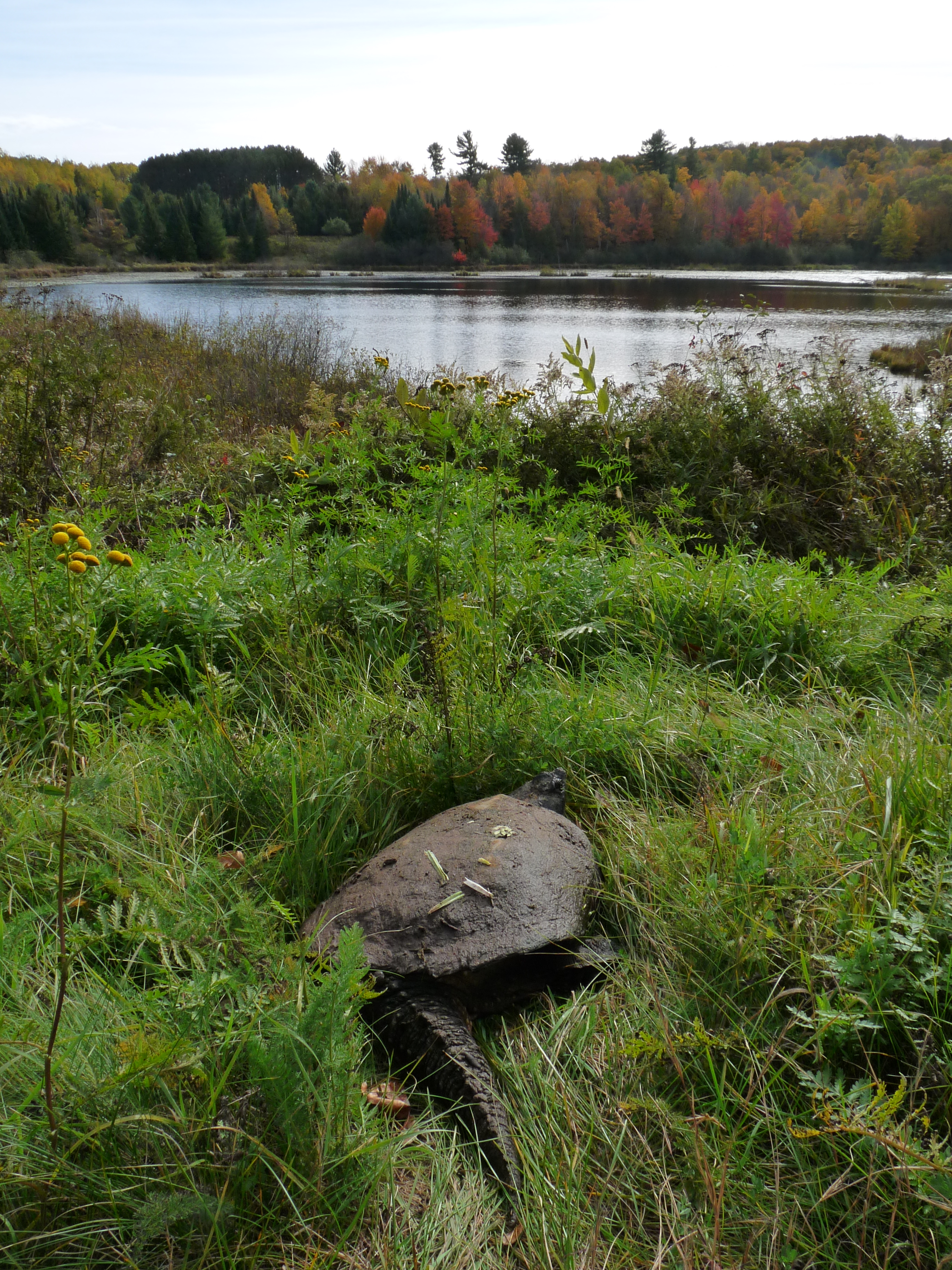
- Foss Lake, just north of Perkinstown, and a Common snapping turtle

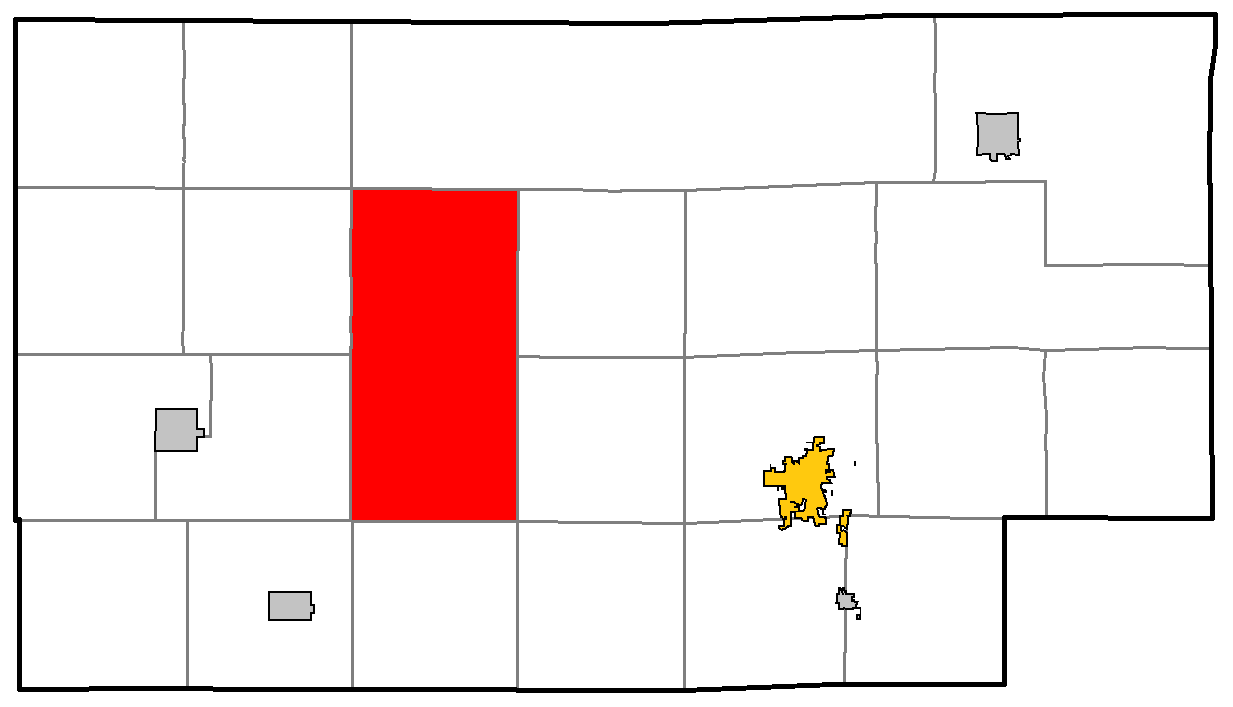
- Location of Grover, within Taylor County

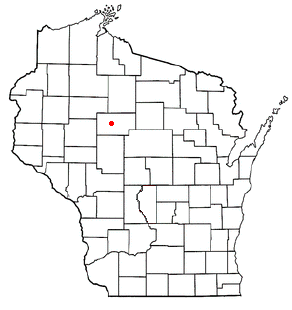
- Location of Grover, Taylor County, Wisconsin
- Coordinates: 45°12′11″N 90°36′52″W
- Country: United States
- State: Wisconsin
- County: Taylor

Area
  - Total: 71.4 sq mi (184.8 km^{2})
  - Land: 70.7 sq mi (183.0 km^{2})
  - Water: 0.69 sq mi (1.8 km^{2})
- Elevation: 1,480 ft (451 m)

Population (2020)
  - Total: 208
  - Density: 2.94/sq mi (1.14/km^{2})
- Time zone: UTC-6 (Central (CST))
  - Summer (DST): UTC-5 (CDT)
- Area codes: 715 & 534
- FIPS code: 55-31750
- GNIS feature ID: 1583328
- PLSS township: T32N R2W and T31N R2W
- Website: http://www.townofgrover.com

Grover is a town in Taylor County, Wisconsin, United States. As of the 2020 census, the town population was 208. The unincorporated community of Perkinstown is located in the town.

== Geography ==
Grover is a large town for this area - six miles by twelve. According to the United States Census Bureau, the town has a total area of 71.4 square miles (184.8 km^{2}), of which 70.7 square miles (183.0 km^{2}) is land and 0.7 square mile (1.8 km^{2}) (0.99%) is water.

Much of Grover is hilly with small glacial lakes. It is part of the Perkinstown terminal moraine, which is discussed in the article on Taylor County. Because the land would be difficult to farm, much of Grover's land was incorporated into the Chequamegon–Nicolet National Forest, and the town includes five of Taylor County's twelve State Natural Areas: Brush Creek Hemlocks, Perkinstown Hemlocks, Pirus Road Swamp, Richter Lake Hemlocks, and Yellow River Ice-walled Lake Plain.

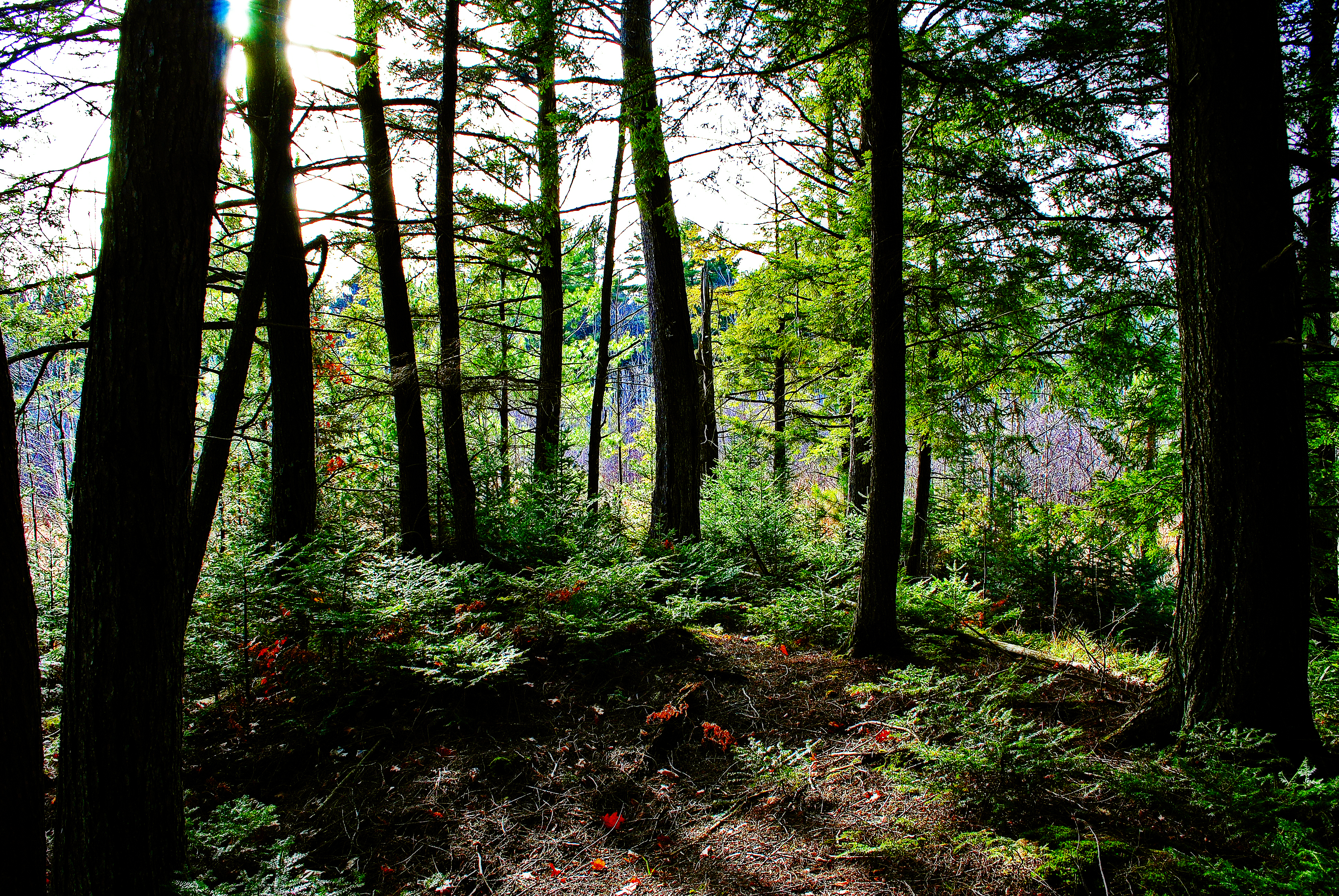
Richter Lake Hemlocks State Natural Area

== History ==
The two six mile squares that would become Grover were first surveyed in the summer of 1847 by a crew working for the U.S. government. Then in the winter of 1857 and 1858 another crew marked all the section corners in the township, walking through the woods and over frozen swamps, measuring with chain and compass. When done, the deputy surveyor filed this general description of the six mile square north of Perkinstown:

This Township contains numerous small Tamarac and Cedar Swamps. These are generally unfit for cultivation. There are some few marshes that are very good for hay. The surface is generally rolling; Soil mostly second rate except on some of the Birch and Maple ridges it is first rate. Timber chiefly Hemlock, Birch, Maple, Pine, Tamarac and Cedar.

Yellow River runs through the North West corner of this Township in a South Westerly course. It is a deep narrow Stream flows in a gentle Current no(?) good for forming motive Power for Mills. There are several small creek running in different Directions bank generally high and dry.

Logging was underway in the area by 1860, with the logging dam at Hughey patented in that year. Other dams on the Yellow River were patented in 1869 and 1873, and on the north fork in 1896. An 1880 map of the area shows a "winter road" crossing the northwest corner of what would become Grover, roughly following the Yellow River up from Chippewa County. This tote road extended through the wilderness all the way to what would become Westboro. It was used to ferry supplies to equip logging camps for the winter logging season. During this phase the loggers focused on cutting white pine - the most valuable tree - floating the logs down the Yellow in spring log drives.

The first settlers in Grover arrived in the early 1880s. Jacob Maurer, Henry Richter, Fred Westrich and Joseph Lechner earned their plots by living on them five years and meeting other requirements of the Homestead Act of 1862. They all settled around what would become Perkinstown. In 1891 the Shaws platted the village of Perkinstown; soon after they started a tannery on the north side of Lake Kathryn, choosing this location because hemlock bark was used for tanning. A small sawmill started about the same time. The tannery closed around 1900, when tanning techniques were developed that didn't use hemlock.

A plat map from around 1900 shows the Wisconsin Central Railroad owning more of what would become Grover than anyone else. In the 1870s the Wisconsin Central had built the first rail line up through the forest that would become Medford. To finance that project, the U.S. government granted the Wisconsin Central half the land for eighteen miles on both sides of their track - generally the odd-numbered sections - and Grover lay within eighteen miles. By 1900 the Wisconsin Central had sold some of that land to lumber companies, but still held some large chunks. Other large landholders are Chippewa Lumber and Boom Company in the north and in the south Sawyer and Austin, J.M. Holway, and various Shaw entities. Some sort of road follows the course of modern Perkintown Avenue in from the east. Another follows the course of modern County M for two miles north of Perkinstown. Another road from the east follows the course of modern highway 64 for a few miles. Scattered settlers' homesteads are marked along all these roads, and also a few west of Perkinstown where there are no roads.

The 1911 plat maps of Grover showed more roads and more settlers. By this time a forerunner of Sawyer Avenue entered the town from the east. Another road followed the course of modern County M. A school is marked at the corner of Perkinstown Avenue and what would become Winter Sports Road. In the southwest corner J.S. Owen's logging railroad presses into the town for a couple miles. Another school is marked two miles north of Perkinstown. Beyond that, the town was still roadless and mostly owned by the Wisconsin Central Railroad, Yellow River Lumber Company, and Northwestern Lumber Company.

== Demographics ==
As of the census of 2000, there were 233 people, 93 households, and 70 families residing in the town. The population density was 3.3 people per square mile (1.3/km^{2}). There were 135 housing units at an average density of 1.9 per square mile (0.7/km^{2}). The racial makeup of the town was 97.42% White and 2.58% Native American. Hispanic or Latino of any race were 0.43% of the population.

There were 93 households, out of which 28.0% had children under the age of 18 living with them, 72.0% were married couples living together, 1.1% had a female householder with no husband present, and 23.7% were non-families. 21.5% of all households were made up of individuals, and 10.8% had someone living alone who was 65 years of age or older. The average household size was 2.51 and the average family size was 2.89.

In the town, the population was spread out, with 22.7% under the age of 18, 6.9% from 18 to 24, 30.5% from 25 to 44, 24.0% from 45 to 64, and 15.9% who were 65 years of age or older. The median age was 40 years. For every 100 females, there were 102.6 males. For every 100 females age 18 and over, there were 102.2 males.

The median income for a household in the town was $38,125, and the median income for a family was $42,500. Males had a median income of $29,531 versus $25,875 for females. The per capita income for the town was $18,031. About 2.9% of families and 2.5% of the population were below the poverty line, including none of those under the age of eighteen and 11.1% of those 65 or over.
