= Hawn =

Hawn is a surname. Notable people with the surname include:

- Goldie Hawn (born 1945), American actress
- Laurie Hawn (born 1947), Canadian Air Force officer and politician
- Mary Hawn, American surgeon
- Rick Hawn (born 1976), American judoka and mixed martial artist
- William R. Hawn (1910–1995), American businessman, philanthropist, race horse owner and breeder

== See also ==
- Hawn State Park, state park of Missouri, United States
- Jack Hawn Creek, Missouri, United States
- Still Hawn, Wisconsin, the original name of Arnold, Wisconsin
