= Jack Lake (Nipissing District) =

Lake in Nipissing District, Ontario, Canada

- Location on a map of Southern Ontario
- Location: Nipissing District, Ontario
- Coordinates: 45°34′38″N 78°33′02″W
- Part of: Saint Lawrence River drainage basin
- Primary outflows: Jack Creek
- Basin countries: Canada
- Max. length: 1,000 m (3,280 ft)
- Max. width: 600 m (1,970 ft)
- Surface elevation: 468 m (1,535 ft)

Jack Lake is a lake in Nipissing District in Northeastern Ontario, Canada. The lake is in Algonquin Provincial Park, is part of the Saint Lawrence River drainage basin, and lies 750 metres (2,460 ft) north of Ontario Highway 60.

The primary inflow is an unnamed stream arriving at the east, and the primary outflow is Jack Creek leaving at the east. Jack Creek flows to Mew Lake, continues to the North Madawaska River, and then via the Madawaska River and the Ottawa River to the Saint Lawrence River. The lake is at an elevation of 468 metres (1,535 ft).

The Hemlock Bluff Trail, a 3.5-kilometre (2.2 mi) loop, leads from Highway 60 to the lake, including along a bluff on the southeast side of the lake

== See also ==
- List of lakes in Ontario
