= Ruby, Wisconsin =

Town of Ruby
- Town
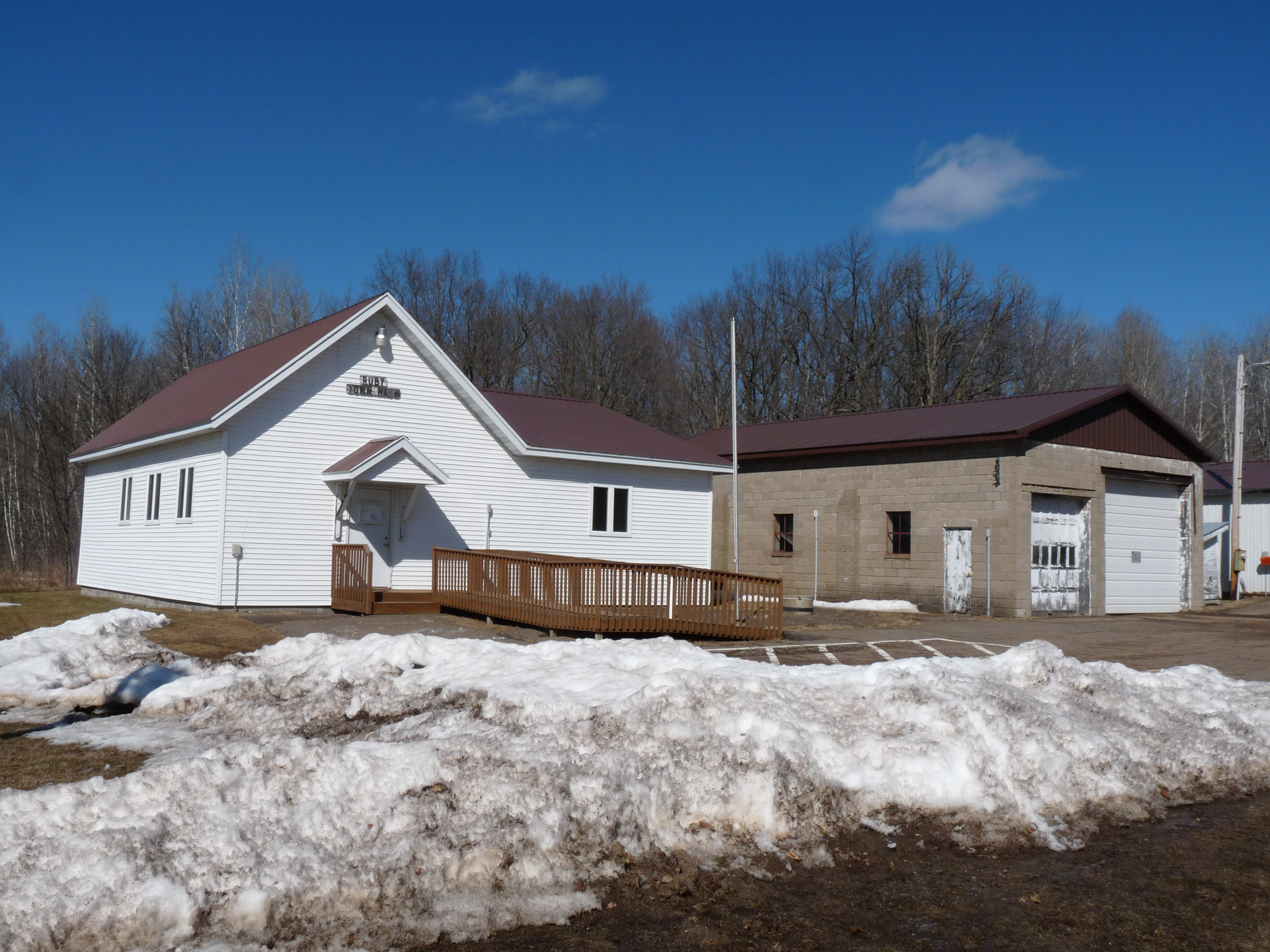
- Town hall

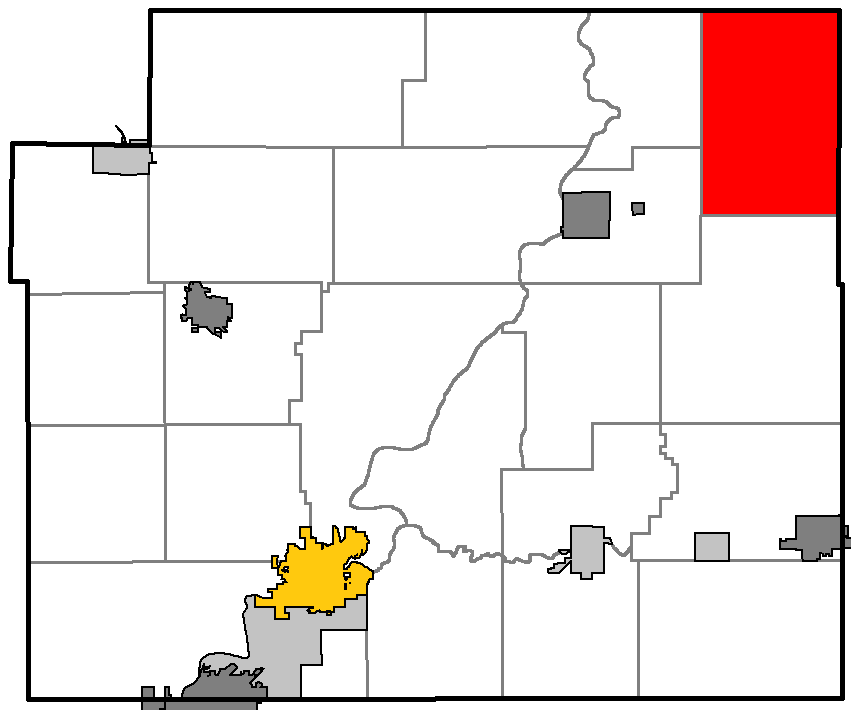
- Location of Ruby within Chippewa County

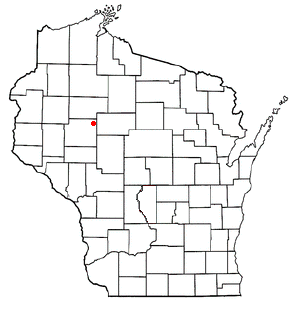
- Location of the Town of Ruby
- Coordinates: 45°14′43″N 90°58′30″W
- Country: United States
- State: Wisconsin
- County: Chippewa

Area
  - Total: 53.6 sq mi (138.9 km^{2})
  - Land: 53.4 sq mi (138.4 km^{2})
  - Water: 0.19 sq mi (0.5 km^{2})
- Elevation: 1,145 ft (349 m)

Population (2020)
  - Total: 465
  - Density: 8.70/sq mi (3.36/km^{2})
- Time zone: UTC-6 (Central (CST))
  - Summer (DST): UTC-5 (CDT)
- Area codes: 715 & 534
- FIPS code: 55-69975
- GNIS feature ID: 1584073
- PLSS township: T32N R5W and north half of T31N R5W

The Town of Ruby is located in northeastern Chippewa County in the U.S. state of Wisconsin. The population was 465 at the 2020 census. The unincorporated communities of Arnold and Ruby are located in the town.

== Geography ==
The town of Ruby is 6 miles (10 km) wide and 9 miles (14 km) from north to south. It occupies the northeastern corner of Chippewa County and is bordered by Rusk County to the north and Taylor County to the east. According to the United States Census Bureau, the town has a total area of 53.6 square miles (138.9 km^{2}), of which 53.4 square miles (138.4 km^{2}) is land and 0.2 square miles (0.5 km^{2}), or 0.34%, is water.

== History ==
The area that would become the town of Ruby was first surveyed in 1852 by two crews working for the U.S. government. From September into October a crew marked all the section corners in the northern 6 miles (10 km) of the township, walking through the woods and slogging through the swamps on foot, measuring with chain and compass. When done, the deputy surveyor filed this general description of the northern 6-mile square:

This Township contains, but little land fit for cultivation, considerable Tamarac swamp, and but little Grass land(?) in Hay meddow. The surface is level except in a few places, where it is uneven(?) not Hilley. None of it above 3rd rate. Timber Hemlock, Pine, Birch Sugar and Balsom. The Pine on and near Fisher and Jump River is of the best quallity and in Considerable quantity.

Fisher River Enters the Township in section 25 and keeps a westerly direction across the Township, leaving it on section 18. The stream has a rapid current and Rockey bed. Jump River Enter on sec 5 and leaves on section 6. Rapid Rocky Stream. Some good Pine on its Banks.

The pine timber in Ruby was mostly logged in the late 1800s. The 1888 plat map shows H.W. Sage & co. as the largest land-holder in what would become the town, followed by Frederick Weyerhaeuser et al., Cornell University, Westville Lumber Co., and J.S. Owen. The map shows no settlers in the town, but a sprinkling of settlers and roads a few miles to the south along the Yellow River.

In 1901 or 1902 E.L. Hawn established the settlement of Ruby, drawn by the hardwood and hemlock in the area. He moved his mills to Ruby from Olivet in Pierce County. His operation consisted of a sawmill, planing mill, lath mill, and shingle mill. The smaller pieces were shipped to Boyd on the train, then hauled overland the last 17 miles. Some heavier parts were later hauled by rail to Arnold and then overland a mere 7 miles. Hawn's lumber yard burned in 1901 and the planing mill a few years later. Nevertheless, by 1904 about 100 people lived around Hawn's mill. Hawn named the settlement Ruby for his only daughter.

In 1903 the Eau Claire, Chippewa Falls & Northeastern Railroad (later called the Omaha) built through the forest at the north end of what would become Ruby, on its way from Chippewa Falls to haul lumber out of the Yellow River area. The railroad established a station where the line crossed the Fisher River, which grew into the little community of Arnold.

The Town of Ruby was split off from the Town of Colburn in 1906. A 1913 summary describes, "The land in this township is rolling, heavily timbered in part and a large portion is "cut over." The soil is clay loam, adapted to the raising of grains, vegetables, fruits, and diversified farming. There are many good roads, schools, churches, and improved farms, with plenty of streams for watering purposes...."

By 1907 Hawn needed a better way to get his lumber products to market. He was then partnered with a Mr. Sill, and they built a small rail line - the Wisconsin, Ruby and Silhawn Railway - seven miles north to connect to the Omaha Railway at Arnold. This light railway roughly followed County G north, dodging around swamps. Pulling the logs was a 0-4-4 Forney Tank steam engine which in a previous life had pulled passengers on Chicago's South Side Elevated Railroad. The settlement of Ruby eventually had a school, a store, a post office, a blacksmith, a livery, some homes, and even board sidewalks. But the timber ran out, the mill closed around 1924 when Ed Hawn died, and the community of Ruby gradually withered, though farms remain.

== Demographics ==
Historical population
Census	Pop.	Note	%±
1990	464		—
2000	446		−3.9%
2010	494		10.8%
2020	465		−5.9%

As of the census of 2000, there were 446 people, 152 households, and 120 families residing in the town. The population density was 8.3 people per square mile (3.2 people/km^{2}). There were 197 housing units at an average density of 3.7 per square mile (1.4/km^{2}). The racial makeup of the town was 99.55% White, 0.22% Native American, 0.22% from other races. Hispanic or Latino of any race were 0.22% of the population.

There were 152 households, out of which 38.2% had children under the age of 18 living with them, 67.8% were married couples living together, 5.3% had a female householder with no husband present, and 20.4% were non-families. 16.4% of all households were made up of individuals, and 5.3% had someone living alone who was 65 years of age or older. The average household size was 2.93 and the average family size was 3.25.

The population was 33.4% under the age of 18, 7.6% from 18 to 24, 27.8% from 25 to 44, 20.9% from 45 to 64, and 10.3% who were 65 years of age or older. The median age was 36 years. For every 100 females, there were 105.5 males. For every 100 females age 18 and over, there were 114 males.

The median income for a household in the town was $30,208, and the median income for a family was $33,125. Males had a median income of $27,750 versus $22,813 for females. The per capita income for the town was $12,587. About 12.4% of families and 16.9% of the population were below the poverty line, including 22.8% of those under age 18 and 11.5% of those age 65 or over.
