= Hannibal, Wisconsin =

Unincorporated community in Wisconsin, United States

- Unincorporated community
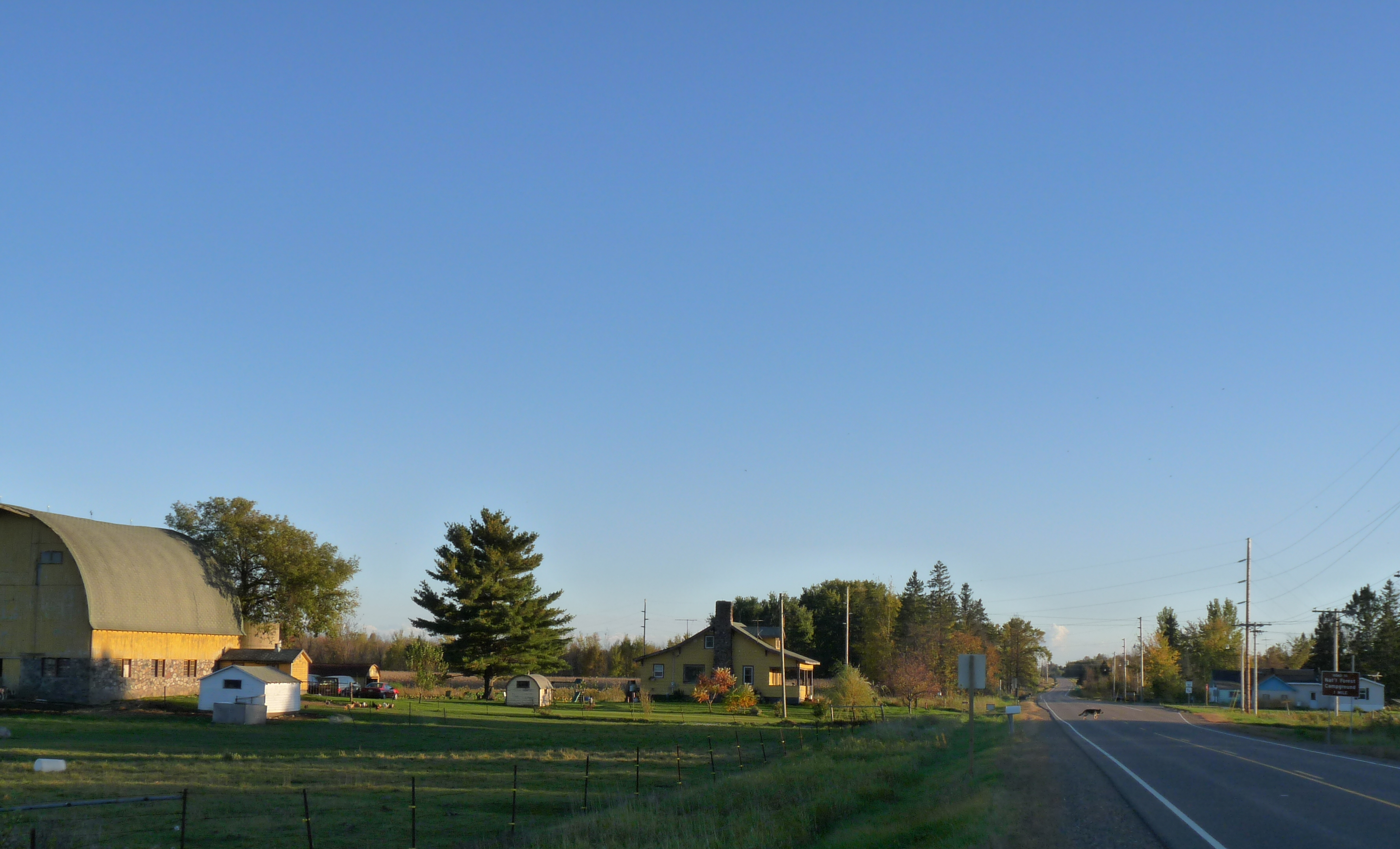
- Approaching from north on highway 73.

- Location within Wisconsin Location within the United States
- Coordinates: 45°15′09″N 90°47′20″W
- Country: United States
- State: Wisconsin
- County: Taylor
- Elevation: 1,266 ft (386 m)
- Time zone: UTC-6 (Central (CST))
  - Summer (DST): UTC-5 (CDT)
- ZIP code: 54439
- Area codes: 715 & 534
- GNIS feature ID: 1566040

Hannibal is an unincorporated community located in Taylor County, Wisconsin, United States. Hannibal is located on Wisconsin Highway 73 and County Highway M north of Gilman, in the town of Cleveland. Today Hannibal is quiet, but once it was a bustling little economic hub at the junction of two logging railroads.

== History ==
In 1903 the Stanley, Merrill and Phillips Railway cut up through the forest and swamps from the south, reaching the site of Hannibal before continuing to Jump River and beyond. The owners of the railroad named this stop "Hannibal" because they had previously run a business in Hannibal, Missouri. The Eau Claire, Chippewa Falls, and Northeastern Railway (a.k.a. Omaha) came through Hannibal from the west shortly after, on its way to Hughey on the Yellow River. The two railroads shared a depot where they crossed. These were logging railroads, built primarily to extract logs from the forests that covered the area.

The first structure in Hannibal was a boxcar beside the SM&P's tracks. A little town quickly grew up at the crossing, with sawmills, saloons, the Kearney hotel, and dance hall, another hotel, a grade school, a livery stable, a blacksmith shop, a shoe shop, a meat market, Burss's general store, and Keefer's store. By 1910, all these were in place, mainly serving logging operations nearby.

In 1912 the "Hannibal Manufacturing Company" was established southwest of the railroad junction, making lath, shingles and wagon wheel hubs. At its peak the mill ran around the clock and employed 30 men. In 1913 the Guinn Brothers store opened, with an opera house upstairs. In 1914 Hannibal's budding Presbyterian congregation completed their new church building. But that was probably the peak of the boom. A fire destroyed some businesses in 1913. Hannibal Manufacturing ceased operation in 1916. With major logging done, the SM&P Railway finally shut down in 1934 and the Omaha in 1939.

The lumber companies sold the cut-over land to families and logging was gradually replaced by farming. A cream collection station opened in Hannibal in 1915, and the Farmers Union Feed Store in 1923. A cheese factory operated there from 1924 to around 1945.

A four-year high school opened on the west side of town in 1937 and operated until 1955. After that the building served as a grade school into the 1990s, and is now a Baptist church. Larmon's store and a gas station also operated into the 1990s. The town's post office closed on May 25, 2011. Now no businesses remain - only homes and the two churches, sprinkled among empty lots and old buildings. The one-time boom town is now usually quiet.
