= Hughey, Wisconsin =

Unincorporated community in Wisconsin, United States

- Unincorporated community
- Location within Wisconsin Location within the United States
- Coordinates: 45°15′04″N 90°41′30″W
- Country: United States
- State: Wisconsin
- County: Taylor
- Elevation: 1,280 ft (390 m)
- Time zone: UTC-6 (Central (CST))
  - Summer (DST): UTC-5 (CDT)
- Area codes: 715 & 534
- GNIS feature ID: 1579494

Hughey is an unpopulated spot in the town of Cleveland, Taylor County, Wisconsin, United States, where logs were once loaded from the Yellow River onto the Omaha Railway. The logging operation was shut down in the 1930s, leaving today only the railroad bed and a few foundations overgrown by brush.

Before settlement, the lands along the upper Yellow River held various kinds of timber: hemlock, birch, maple, white pine, etc. White pine was the most valuable, and was floated down the river in log drives. But the Yellow was not easy to drive and the logging companies built log-driving dams so they could release "splashes" of water to push logs along when the natural floods didn't do the job. One of these "splash dams" was built about 1861 near the spot that would become Hughey. After the pine was logged, other timber species remained, but they didn't float well.

In 1902 a subsidiary of the Omaha Railway, the Eau Claire, Chippewa Falls, and Northeastern Railway began building a line up along the Chippewa River from Chippewa Falls to Holcombe. In 1903, that railway extended its line from Holcombe through Arnold and Hannibal to the Yellow River, primarily so that the Yellow River Lumber Company could get access to their timber holdings in that area. Where the rail line reached the river, they built a loading works, where logs could be fished out from their boom in the river and loaded onto rail-cars bound for the company's sawmill in Stillwater. The stop was named for E.K. Hughey, president of the Yellow River Lumber Co.

Along with the loading works, the site had a bunkhouse, a livestock corral, another structure, a wye for turning engines, and a gravel pit. From Hughey, one spur branched off northeast for five miles, into the Yellow River Lumber Company's logging operations. In 1908 it was reported that Yellow River Lumber Co. was loading 30 cars of lumber per day for shipment. A second spur branched off to the south to another loading works downstream on the river, run by the Stanley, Merrill and Phillips Railroad.

By 1935 the line was no longer needed and the operator applied to the Public Service Commission to stop running trains to Hughey. The request was approved, and the rails were pulled up. Today Hughey is a quiet brushy place along the Yellow River, with no one living there - only a farm nearby.
