= Jack Creek (Nipissing District) =

- Location of the mouth of Jack Creek on a map of Southern Ontario

Location
- Country: Canada
- Province: Ontario
- Region: Northeastern Ontario
- District: Nipissing

Physical characteristics
- Source: Jack Lake
  - coordinates: 45°34′39″N 78°32′42″W
  - elevation: 468 m (1,535 ft)
- Mouth: North Madawaska River
  - coordinates: 45°34′38″N 78°33′02″W
  - elevation: 395 m (1,296 ft)

Jack Creek is a stream in Nipissing District in Northeastern Ontario, Canada. It is Algonquin Provincial Park, is a right tributary of the North Madawaska River, and is part of the Saint Lawrence River drainage basin.

== Course ==
The creek begins at Jack Lake and flows east, passes under Ontario Highway 60, and flows into the southwest side of Mew Lake. It exits the lake at the northwest, flows north under Highway 60, turns east, and reaches its mouth at the North Madawaska River, which flows via the Madawaska River and the Ottawa River to the Saint Lawrence River.

== Recreation ==
The Mew Lake Campground, open year-round, is on Mew Lake. A portion of the Bat Lake Trail, a 5.8-kilometre (3.6 mi) loop, follows the course of Jack Creek, and the Hemlock Bluff Trail, a 3.5-kilometre (2.2 mi) loop, leads from Highway 60 to Jack Lake, including along a bluff on the southeast side of the lake.
