= Pewee Lake (Ontario) =

Lake in Nipissing District, Ontario, Canada

- Location on a map of Southern Ontario
- Location: Nipissing District, Ontario
- Coordinates: 45°34′18″N 78°31′29″W
- Part of: Saint Lawrence River drainage basin
- Basin countries: Canada
- Max. length: 260 m (850 ft)
- Max. width: 140 m (460 ft)
- Surface elevation: 401 m (1,316 ft)

Pewee Lake is a lake in Nipissing District in Northeastern Ontario, Canada. The lake is in Algonquin Provincial Park, is part of the Saint Lawrence River drainage basin, and lies astride Ontario Highway 60.

The primary inflow is an unnamed stream arriving at the south, and the primary outflow is an unnamed stream leaving at the north. It flows to Mew Lake, then via Jack Creek, the North Madawaska River, the Madawaska River and the Ottawa River to the Saint Lawrence River. The lake is at an elevation of 401 metres (1,316 ft).

The trailhead for the Highland Backpacking Trail, with 19-kilometre (12 mi) and 35-kilometre (22 mi) loops is immediately off Highway 60 on the north side of the lake, and Mew Lake Campground is adjacent at the northeast.

== See also ==
- List of lakes in Ontario
