= Molitor, Wisconsin =

- Town
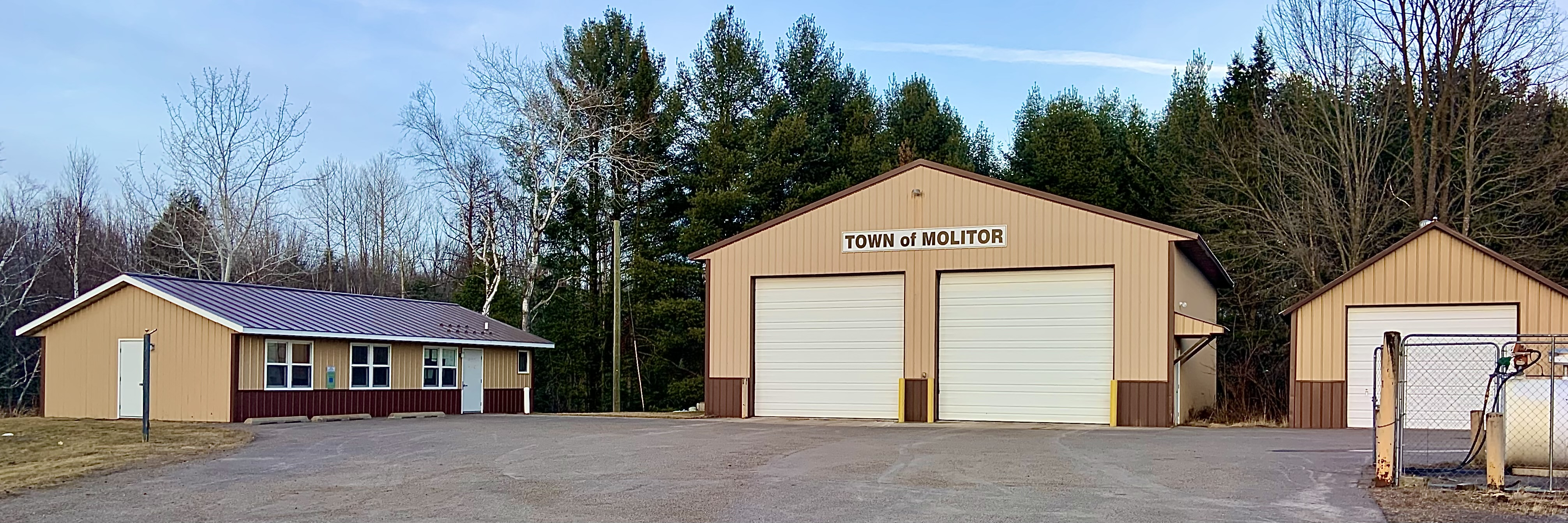
- Town hall

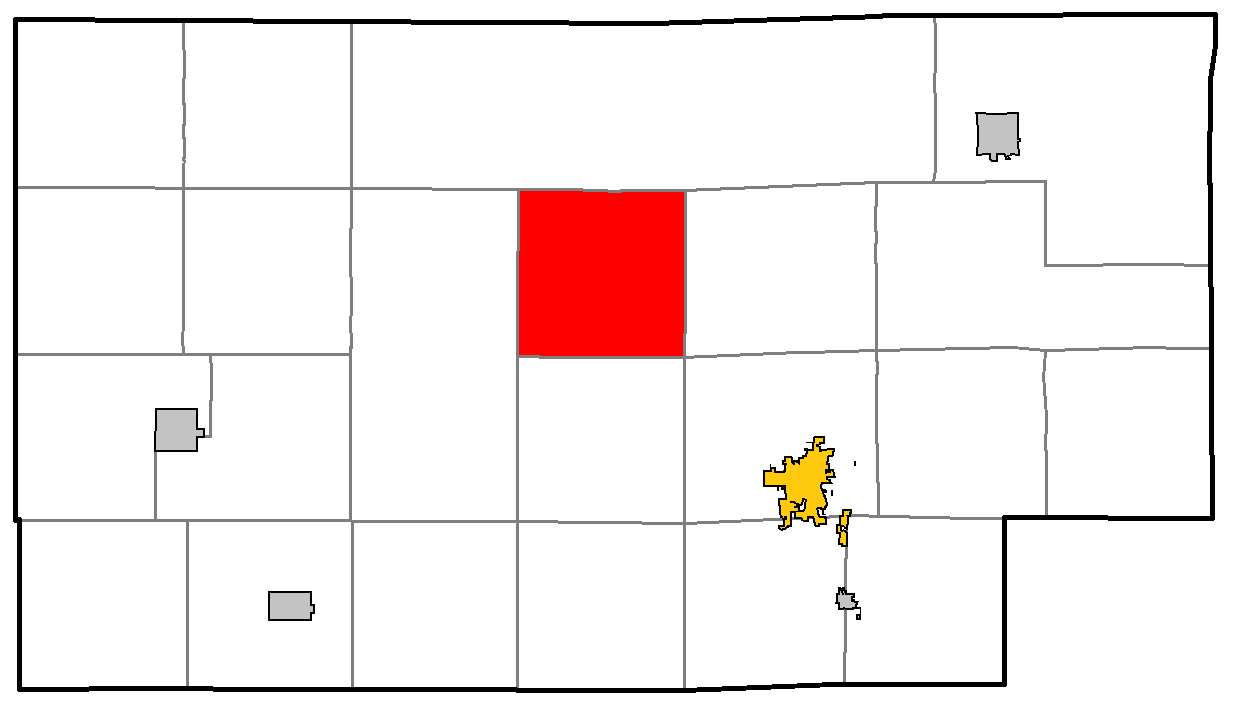
- Location of Molitor, within Taylor County

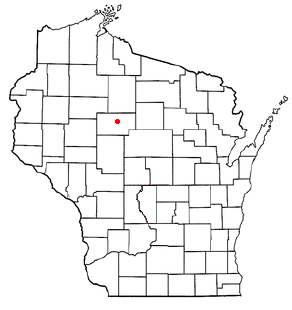
- Location of Molitor, Wisconsin
- Coordinates: 45°15′15″N 90°29′0″W
- Country: United States
- State: Wisconsin
- County: Taylor

Area
  - Total: 35.9 sq mi (93.1 km^{2})
  - Land: 35.3 sq mi (91.4 km^{2})
  - Water: 0.66 sq mi (1.7 km^{2})
- Elevation: 1,427 ft (435 m)

Population (2020)
  - Total: 308
  - Density: 8.73/sq mi (3.37/km^{2})
- Time zone: UTC-6 (Central (CST))
  - Summer (DST): UTC-5 (CDT)
- Area codes: 715 & 534
- FIPS code: 55-53550
- GNIS feature ID: 1583734
- PLSS township: T32N R1W

Molitor is a town in Taylor County, Wisconsin, United States. The population was 308 at the 2020 census.

== Geography ==
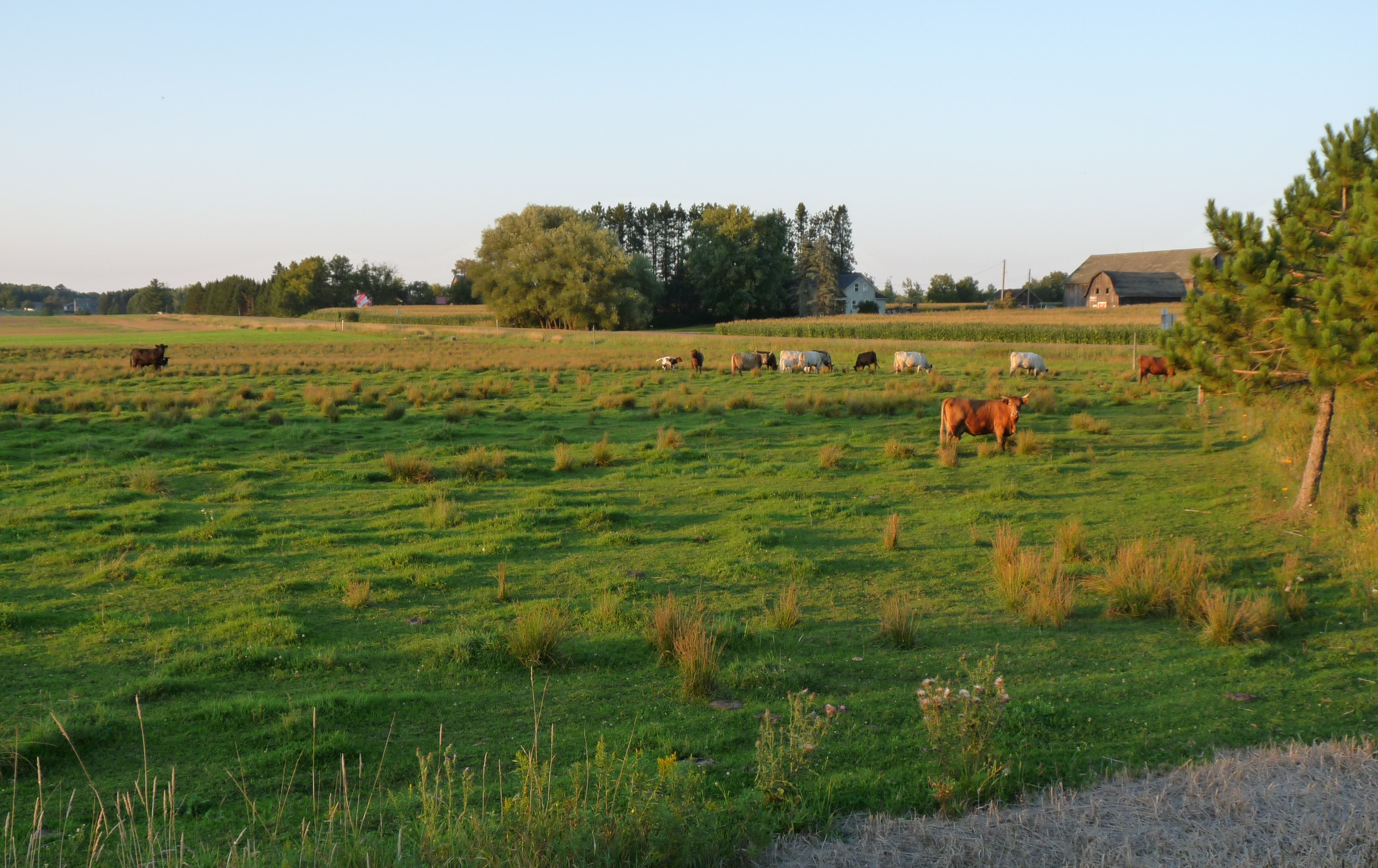
This farm sits in the plain left by an ice-walled lake at the junction of M and E.

According to the United States Census Bureau, the town has a total area of 36.0 square miles (93.1 km^{2}), of which 35.3 square miles (91.4 km^{2}) is land and 0.7 square mile (1.7 km^{2}) (1.86%) is water.

Most of Molitor is hilly, with small glacial lakes. It lies within the Perkinstown terminal moraine, which is described under Taylor County. Among the hills are some flat areas with rims which were the bottoms of ice-walled lakes after the last glacier receded.

Three of Taylor County's twelve state natural areas lie in this town: Lost Lake Esker SNA, Twin Lakes Bog SNA, and Mondeaux Hardwoods SNA.

== History ==
The east side of the six mile (10 km) square that would become Molitor, which lies on the Fourth Principal Meridian, was first surveyed in May 1847 by a crew working for the U.S. government. Then in the winter of 1857 and 1858 another crew marked all the section corners in the township, walking through the woods and over frozen swamps, measuring with chain and compass. When done, the deputy surveyor filed this general description:

This Township contains numerous Tamarac and Cedar swamps but very few of much extent and Generally unfit for cultivation. The Surface is Broken and mostly 2nd rate soil and not very good for cultivation. Timber is very heavy all over the Township. Chiefly Hemlock Birch Pine and Tamarac. Tamarac and Spruce Trees principally line the Streams. There are several lake in this Township but not of much extent. There are numerous small streams running in a Northerly(?) direction (?) of which are generally Swampy among those are the East Branch of Yellow River raises in the South Easter portion of the Township and runs in a Northwesterly direction through the Township it flows(?) in a gentle current Deep and narrow not well adapted for good motive power or mills.

An 1880 map of central Wisconsin shows nothing of note in what would become Molitor except a patch of cranberries near the north fork of the Yellow River. The Town of Molitor was organized in 1886.

By 1900, a road of some sort ran across much of the south end of the town, following the course of modern Keyes Avenue. Sideroads reached to the north and south, but no more than a mile. Along those roads, the maps show about fifteen settlers' homesteads. The map shows a sawmill on Kleutsch land where modern Kleutsch Drive is. A school and church are at the junction of Keyes and Division Drive, and other schools were near Sackett Lake and the intersection of Keyes and Lake 19 Road. Four parcels in the southeast quarter were owned by Molitors. The northern half was unsettled yet, with Chippewa Lumber and Boom owning the largest portion, followed by the Wisconsin Central Railroad. The map showed a logging dam on the Yellow River in Section 10 on land owned by the Shaw Tannery.

The 1911 plat map shows not a lot of change. The roads had extended another mile and a few more settlers had taken up residence in the south. The Molitor name was replaced by other owners. A road clearly followed the course of modern County M. In the north, the Northwestern Lumber Co. had bought Chippewa Lumber and Boom's land, and there were still no roads and few settlers.

In 1933, much of Molitor was designated part of the Chequamegon National Forest.

== Demographics ==
As of the census of 2000, there were 263 people, 100 households, and 80 families residing in the town. The population density was 7.5 people per square mile (2.9/km^{2}). There were 142 housing units at an average density of 4.0 per square mile (1.6/km^{2}). The racial makeup of the town was 98.48% White, 0.38% Native American, 0.76% from other races, and 0.38% from two or more races. Hispanic or Latino of any race were 0.76% of the population.

There were 100 households, out of which 31.0% had children under the age of 18 living with them, 72.0% were married couples living together, 5.0% had a female householder with no husband present, and 20.0% were non-families. 17.0% of all households were made up of individuals, and 5.0% had someone living alone who was 65 years of age or older. The average household size was 2.63 and the average family size was 2.96.

In the town, the population was spread out, with 25.1% under the age of 18, 7.2% from 18 to 24, 27.8% from 25 to 44, 28.5% from 45 to 64, and 11.4% who were 65 years of age or older. The median age was 40 years. For every 100 females, there were 113.8 males. For every 100 females age 18 and over, there were 101.0 males.

The median income for a household in the town was $37,500, and the median income for a family was $43,750. Males had a median income of $28,750 versus $20,568 for females. The per capita income for the town was $18,804. About 13.1% of families and 13.4% of the population were below the poverty line, including 31.7% of those under the age of eighteen and none of those 65 or over.
