= Jack Creek (Harrington Creek) =

Stream in Elko County, Nevada, United States

Jack Creek is a stream in Elko County, Nevada, United States, that is a tributary of Harrington Creek. The unincorporated community of Jack Creek, is located at the mouth of the stream.

== History ==
Jack Creek was named for P. J. "Old Jack" Harrington, an early rancher.

== Features ==
Point	Coordinates (links to map & photo sources)
Chicken Creek Summit (source of creek)	41.5768501°N 116.0098105°W
Jacks Peak (mouth of creek)	41.4901836°N 116.1023116°W

== See also ==
- List of rivers of Nevada
