= Jack Creek (Des Moines River tributary) =

Coordinates: 43.7671812°N 95.2858309°W

- Mouth of the Jack Creek

Location
- Country: United States
- State: Minnesota
- County: Jackson County, Nobles County

Physical characteristics
- Mouth
- Length: 64 mi-long (103 km)

Jack Creek is a 64-mile-long (103 km) stream in southern Minnesota in the United States. It is a tributary of Heron Lake, the outlet of which flows to the Des Moines River.

According to Warren Upham, Jack Creek was probably named for the jackrabbits near the creek.

== See also ==
- List of rivers of Minnesota
- USGS Hydrologic Unit Map - State of Minnesota (1974)
