= Jack Creek (South Dakota) =

Stream in South Dakota, U.S.

Coordinates: 45°42′31″N 103°22′28″W

Jack Creek is a stream in the U.S. state of South Dakota.

Jack Creek derives its name from the nickname ("Jack") of the gun a cowboy lost near the creek.

== See also ==
- List of rivers of South Dakota
- List of rivers of the United States
