= Arnold, Wisconsin =

- unincorporated community
- Location within Wisconsin Location within the United States
- Coordinates: 45°14′56″N 91°00′15″W
- Country: United States
- State: Wisconsin
- County: Chippewa
- Town: Ruby
- Elevation: 1,132 ft (345 m)
- Time zone: UTC-6 (Central (CST))
  - Summer (DST): UTC-5 (CDT)
- Area codes: 715 and 534
- GNIS feature ID: 1577495

Arnold is an unincorporated community located in the town of Ruby, Chippewa County, Wisconsin, United States, where County M and County G cross the Fisher River.

In 1903 the Eau Claire, Chippewa Falls & Northeastern Railroad (later called the Omaha) built through the forest and swamps of Chippewa County, on its way from Chippewa Falls to haul lumber out of the Yellow River area. The railroad made a station where its line crossed the Fisher River. A section house and saloon were built.

In 1904 Herb and Martha Deuel moved to the little outpost and added a hotel, barn and store. In 1905 Herb established a post office named for his son Arnold. (The post office at Curtiss had already taken the name of his other son.) Things grew fast. By the end of the year Deuel had also started a sawmill, and the community had a school, a depot, a stockyard, a blacksmith shop, a lumber yard, and a few more homes. The store had a dance hall upstairs, and a traveling minister would occasionally preach in the hotel lobby. Around 1907 Deuel started a telephone exchange connected to Chippewa Falls. Also in that year, another railroad - the Wisconsin, Ruby and Silhawn - was built south from Arnold, threading its way between the swamps specifically to haul out sawed lumber from the mill in Ruby; it ran for five years. A 1917 map shows two Arnold Food Products warehouses next to the siding. A pickle factory operated there through the 1920s.

In 1930, the community's population had grown to 225, but the lumber was running out. The railroad shut down that year and the depot became a tavern. Postal service was discontinued in 1934. Eventually the school closed, and as of the 2020s only a bar and some homes and farms remain.
