= Jacks Creek (Apalachee River tributary) =

- Location within Georgia Location within the United States

Physical characteristics
- Source
  - coordinates: 33.8309469°N 83.7087839°W
- Mouth
  - coordinates: 33.7381780°N 83.4521068°W

Jacks Creek is a stream in the U.S. state of Georgia. It is a tributary to the Apalachee River.

Jacks Creek was named after John Clark (1766–1832), American politician and governor of Georgia.
