= Jack Creek, Nevada =

Unincorporated community in Elko County, Nevada, United States

- Unincorporated community
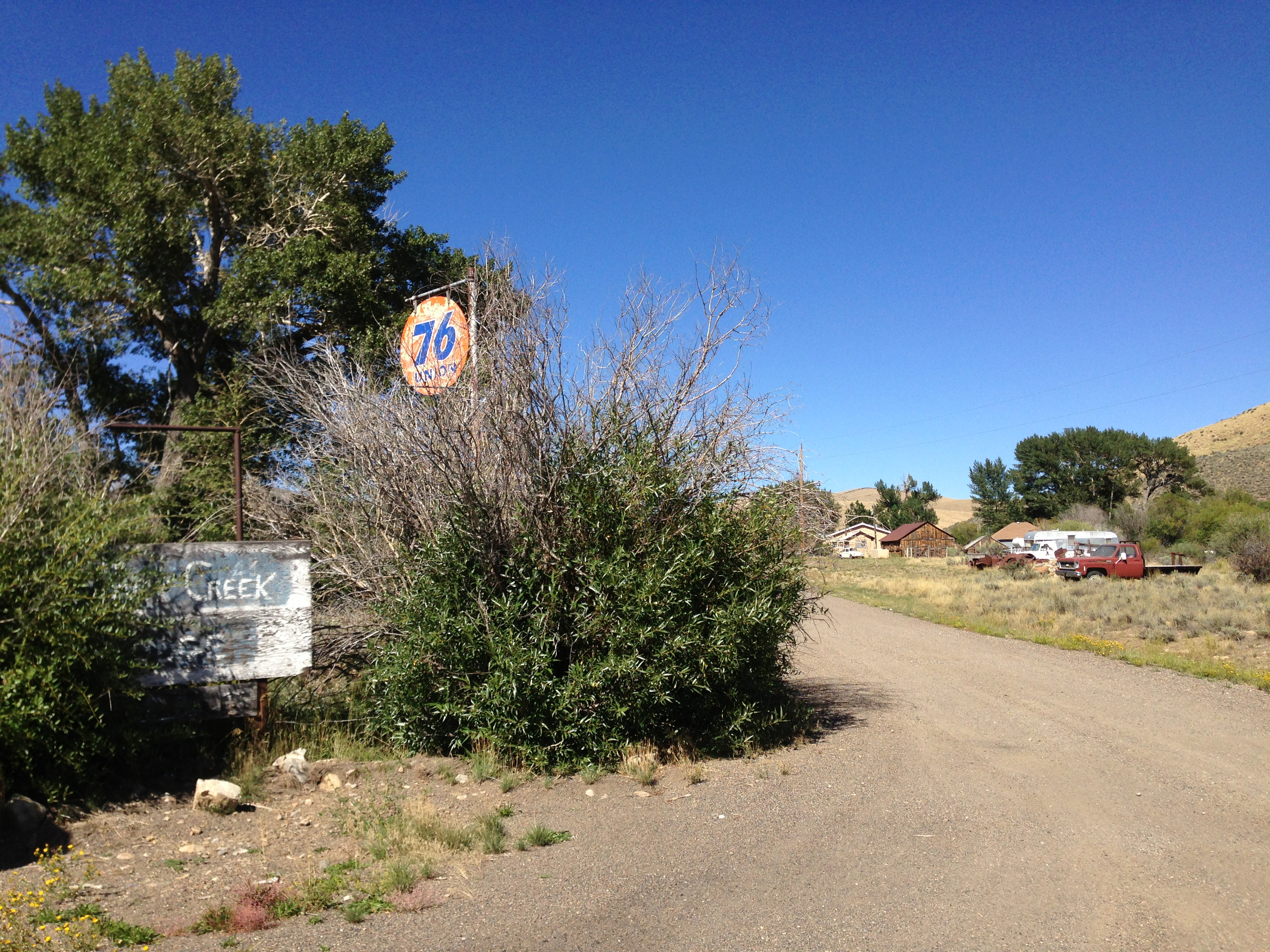

- Location within the state of Nevada
- Coordinates: 41°29′41″N 116°05′59″W
- Country: United States
- State: Nevada
- County: Elko
- Elevation: 6,168 ft (1,880 m)
- Time zone: UTC-8 (Pacific (PST))
  - Summer (DST): UTC-7 (PDT)
- GNIS feature ID: 862573

Jack Creek is an unincorporated community in Elko County, Nevada, United States.

== Description ==
The community is located on Herrington Creek at the mouth of its namesake Jack Creek. The two creeks were named after P. J. "Old Jack" Harrington, the area's first settler who homesteaded there in 1868 and ranched the rest of his life in the area..

The Jack Creek area became the prime source of wood for Tuscarora. Jack Creek soon became a stop on the Northern Stage Company's line from Tuscarora to Mountain City. It was created a little community of about 20 inhabitants and few other ranches had formed in the region. A local rancher Chesley Woodward operated in the city a store, a restaurant, a rooming house for many years. Population has increased and an Opera House was built there, but it was very small, but people of the little community liked of the leisure and camaraderie. Harrington died in 1886 and his properties were acquired by several owners and the area was developed for travelers and fishing parties and hunters and became a local sportsmen's mecca.
