= Gilman, Taylor County, Wisconsin =

Gilman
- Village
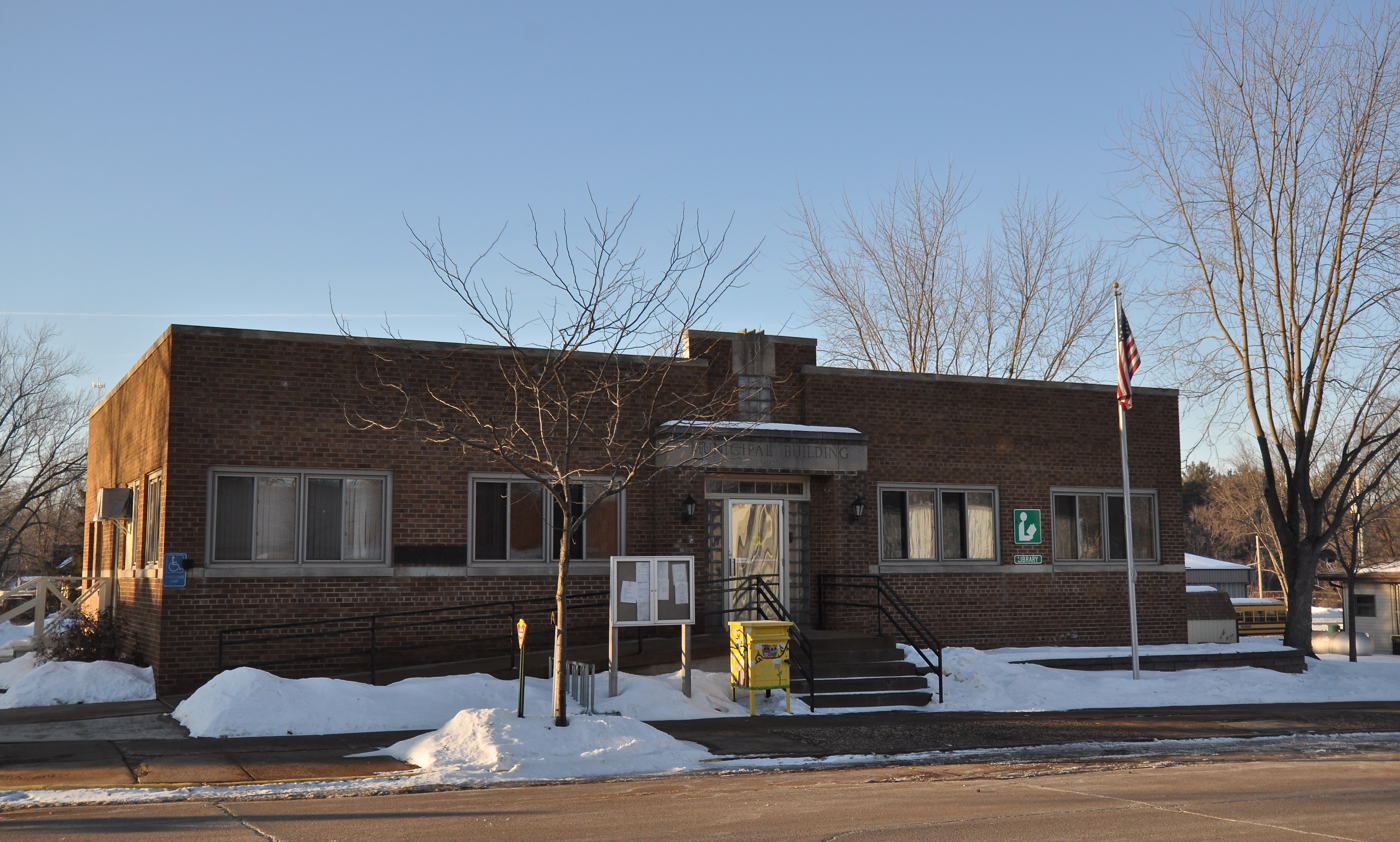
- Village of Gilman Municipal Building, February 2015.

- Location of Gilman in Taylor County, Wisconsin.

- Location within the state of Wisconsin
- Coordinates: 45°09′58″N 90°48′26″W
- Country: United States
- State: Wisconsin
- County: Taylor

Area
  - Total: 2.34 sq mi (6.06 km^{2})
  - Land: 2.34 sq mi (6.06 km^{2})
  - Water: 0 sq mi (0.00 km^{2})
- Elevation: 1,224 ft (373 m)

Population (2020)
  - Total: 378
  - Density: 162/sq mi (62.4/km^{2})
- Time zone: UTC-6 (Central (CST))
  - Summer (DST): UTC-5 (CDT)
- ZIP codes: 54433
- Area codes: 715 & 534
- FIPS code: 55-29175
- GNIS feature ID: 1583276
- Website: Official website

Gilman is a village in Taylor County, Wisconsin, United States, located between the towns of Aurora and Ford. Its population was 378 at the 2020 census.

== Geography ==
The village is in southwestern Taylor County adjacent to the intersection of highways 64 and 73. It also lies on the Yellow River and the Canadian National rail line. The Chequamegon–Nicolet National Forest lies three miles to the east.

According to the United States Census Bureau, the village has a total area of 2.34 square miles (6.06 km^{2}), all land.

== History ==
Before logging and settlers, the land around Gilman was covered with a mosaic of forest and swamps, drained by the Yellow River. Native Americans travelled along the river, at times portaging over to the Big Rib River to reach the Wisconsin River valley. By 1800, the area around Gilman was dominated by Ojibwe people, but Dakota, Ho-Chunk and Menominee were not far away. In 1837 the U.S. forced the Ojibwe to cede much of northern Wisconsin, including the area that would become Gilman, in the White Pine Treaty. Government surveyors came through in 1847 and again in 1854, marking section lines and assessing timber and mill sites.

Some time after that, the river-transport phase of logging began, in which loggers felled pine trees within a few miles of the Yellow River and its streams, skidded them to the stream banks, and floated the logs downriver past the future site of Gilman in spring log drives. By 1880 a "Winter Road" followed the river through the vicinity of what would become Gilman, heading for logging operations upstream. No one lived at Gilman itself until 1902 or 1903, though settlers had spread up the river west of Gilman as near as four miles by 1888.

In 1902 and 1903 the rails of the Stanley, Merrill and Phillips Railway crossed the Yellow River into what would become Gilman, heading for Jump River and beyond. The SM&P was a subsidiary of the Northwestern Lumber Company, constructing its railroad primarily to haul logs from Northwestern's timber lands to its big mill in Stanley. This began the railroad-transport phase of logging, in which pine more than a few miles from streams was hauled out by rail, as well as hardwoods which didn't float well. The SM&P built a section house and water tower where the line crossed the river, and that was the start of Gilman. It was initially named Moorhouse for the superintendent of the SM&P, but was renamed Gilman for Sally Gilman, the wife of the president of Northwestern Lumber. The SM&P ran generally north through town, passing east of the current school. It carried some passengers and freight, but mainly transported logs. Around 1905, the Wisconsin Central Railway built a separate line northwest through town, heading from Owen to Ladysmith and eventually Superior. This line later became the Soo Line Railroad and was eventually acquired by the Canadian National Railway, which still operates on the track.

The stump-ridden little community where the railroad crossed the river grew fast. In 1904 Northwestern Lumber platted a few blocks of village lots east of what is now 8th Avenue. That year a small school was established. The following year a bigger four-room school was built, and Mrs. Case started a boarding house to serve railroad workers, lumberjacks, and new arrivals. Also established in that first ten years: a small jail, a livery house, saloons, the McSloy Hotel, Crum's general store, a barber, a post office, a feed and flour store, a warehouse, a hardware store, and Kapszukiewicz's Market. The Wisconsin Central Railroad built its own depot on the west side of town. In 1907 Roy Heagle and others started a stave and heading mill called Gilman Manufacturing Company on the south side of town near the river. It made barrels from local basswood and by 1912 it employed as many as sixty men. Heagle also ran a planing mill and a lath mill in Gilman. Another mill made hubs for wagon wheels.

Gilman incorporated as a village in 1914. Early priorities of the village board included liquor licenses, street lights, organizing a volunteer fire department, and an ordinance to ban cattle, horses and pigs from running loose in the village. Also in 1914, Gilman's first Bank was established, which would evolve into the State Bank of Gilman. In 1915 the park was started, with the swinging bridge and a dance pavilion. That same year the Catholic Church was organized. Other denominations followed shortly. 1915 also added a new sawmill, a potato warehouse, and a physician - Dr. Slinker. In 1916 three gas lights lit the streets at night - the only street lights between Owen and Ladysmith at the time. A high school was started in 1917 with 31 students.

During World War I the stave and heading mill ran around the clock making barrels for ammunition. After the war, in 1919, construction began on a new high school. Timber in the area was beginning to dwindle, but still it is said that in 1921 two million feet of logs were brought in to be processed by the Gilman mills. As the timber was cut off, the lumber companies began selling the cut-over forties in the surrounding country to settler families who gradually wrestled small farms out of the stumplands, and Gilman began to shift to serving those farmers.

In Easter Sunday of 1922 a fire destroyed much of Gilman's business district. Some of the businesses rebuilt and others were replaced by new businesses - some choosing masonry construction over wood. Around 1926 Gilman gained electrical service, largely driven by the Gilman Booster Club. As markets changed, Gilman's mills gradually closed. The stave and heading mill ran until 1935, then tried making toys for a few years, then closed during the Great Depression. In the late 1930s the municipal water system was installed, financed by the New Deal WPA. The first part of the sewer system was installed in 1946. A new village hall, library and fire department building were built around 1947.

Two miles to the south, the village of Polley had grown through much of this same time, also on the SM&P railroad. It had its own school, a hotel-saloon, a general store, a forty-man sawmill, a barber, a cheese factory, a millinery shop, and a newspaper. But the SM&P shut down in the 1930s and Polley gradually declined until today only a bar and some homes and farms remain. The Polley cheese factory closed too and in 1932 its owner bought the cheese factory in Gilman - eventually called Drangle's and Gilman Cheese - which has been a major employer for many years since the mills closed.

In the 1950s Gilman High became the central high school for all of western Taylor County, leading to additions to the complex in years that followed. Since then the primary schools have been centralized at Gilman too.

Today Gilman is smaller than it once was, but it has a hardware store, a few cafes, a bank, and other services. Major employers in town are the school and Gilman Cheese. The major events each year are the Fall Fest and Snieg (Polish for snow) Fest in February, which features snow sculpting and a frying pan toss.

== Demographics ==
Historical population
| Census | Pop. | Note | %± |
|---|---|---|---|
| 1920 | 522 | | — |
| 1930 | 414 | | −20.7% |
| 1940 | 440 | | 6.3% |
| 1950 | 402 | | −8.6% |
| 1960 | 379 | | −5.7% |
| 1970 | 328 | | −13.5% |
| 1980 | 436 | | 32.9% |
| 1990 | 412 | | −5.5% |
| 2000 | 474 | | 15.0% |
| 2010 | 410 | | −13.5% |
| 2020 | 378 | | −7.8% |
U.S. Decennial Census

=== 2010 census ===
As of the census of 2010, there were 410 people, 187 households, and 97 families residing in the village. The population density was 175.2 inhabitants per square mile (67.6/km^{2}). There were 218 housing units at an average density of 93.2 per square mile (36.0/km^{2}). The racial makeup of the village was 99.5% White, 0.2% from other races, and 0.2% from two or more races. Hispanic or Latino of any race were 0.5% of the population.

There were 187 households, of which 23.0% had children under the age of 18 living with them, 36.9% were married couples living together, 10.2% had a female householder with no husband present, 4.8% had a male householder with no wife present, and 48.1% were non-families. 43.3% of all households were made up of individuals, and 22.5% had someone living alone who was 65 years of age or older. The average household size was 2.06 and the average family size was 2.89.

The median age in the village was 47.8 years. 21.7% of residents were under the age of 18; 5.1% were between the ages of 18 and 24; 19.5% were from 25 to 44; 26.3% were from 45 to 64; and 27.3% were 65 years of age or older. The gender makeup of the village was 49.0% male and 51.0% female.

=== 2000 census ===
As of the census of 2000, there were 474 people, 185 households, and 110 families residing in the village. The population density was 202.8 people per square mile (78.2/km^{2}). There were 209 housing units at an average density of 89.4/sq mi (34.5/km^{2}). The racial makeup of the village was 97.89% White, 0.42% Asian, 1.48% from other races, and 0.21% from two or more races. Hispanic or Latino of any race were 1.69% of the population.

There were 185 households, out of which 24.9% had children under the age of 18 living with them, 44.9% were married couples living together, 10.8% had a female householder with no husband present, and 40.5% were non-families. 36.8% of all households were made up of individuals, and 18.9% had someone living alone who was 65 years of age or older. The average household size was 2.26 and the average family size was 2.97.

In the village, the population was spread out, with 19.8% under the age of 18, 6.8% from 18 to 24, 24.3% from 25 to 44, 21.1% from 45 to 64, and 28.1% who were 65 years of age or older. The median age was 44 years. For every 100 females, there were 100.0 males. For every 100 females age 18 and over, there were 91.9 males.

The median income for a household in the village was $32,708, and the median income for a family was $50,833. Males had a median income of $29,875 versus $22,083 for females. The per capita income for the village was $18,075. About 7.8% of families and 14.0% of the population were below the poverty line, including 11.8% of those under age 18 and 30.8% of those age 65 or over.

== Landmarks ==
The Gilman swinging bridge is a landmark of the community

== See also ==
- List of villages in Wisconsin
