= Mew Lake =

Lake in Nipissing District, Ontario, Canada

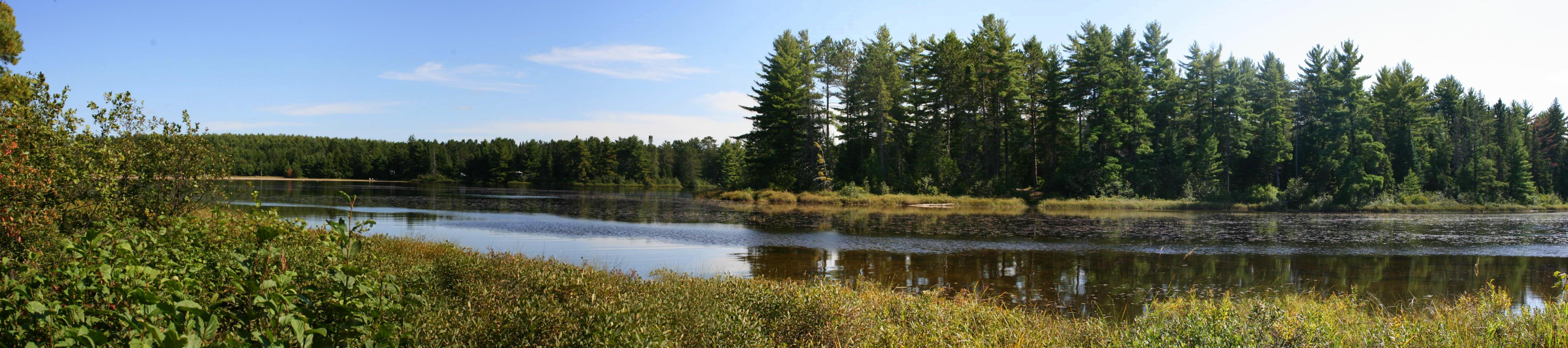

- Location on a map of Southern Ontario
- Location: Nipissing District, Ontario
- Coordinates: 45°34′37″N 78°31′05″W
- Part of: Saint Lawrence River drainage basin
- Basin countries: Canada
- Max. length: 500 m (1,600 ft)
- Max. width: 400 m (1,300 ft)
- Surface elevation: 399 m (1,309 ft)

Mew Lake is a lake in Nipissing District in Northeastern Ontario, Canada. The lake is in Algonquin Provincial Park, is part of the Saint Lawrence River drainage basin, and lies astride Ontario Highway 60.

The primary inflow, arriving at the southwest, and outflow, leaving at the northwest, is Jack Creek. A secondary, unnamed inflow arrives from Pewee Lake at the southwest. Jack Creek flows via the North Madawaska River, the Madawaska River and the Ottawa River to the Saint Lawrence River. The lake is at an elevation of 399 metres (1,309 ft).

The Mew Lake Campground at Algonquin Provincial Park is on the lake. It is open year-round, with campsites with electrical hookups, radio-free and dog-free zones, and seven roofed accommodation yurts.

== See also ==
- List of lakes in Ontario
