= Jack Creek (Buck Creek tributary) =

Stream in the U.S. state of Missouri

Jack Creek (also known as Jack Hawn Creek) is a stream in northeastern Bollinger County in the U.S. state of Missouri. It is a tributary of Buck Creek.

The stream headwaters arise at 37°31′31″N 89°59′58″W at an elevation of approximately 705 feet. The headwater location is one-half mile north of Missouri Route 72 and one mile northeast of Patton Junction and approximately 1.5 miles north-northeast of Patton. The stream flows northeast for 1.5 miles to its confluence with Buck Creek at 37°32′14″N 89°58′28″W at an elevation of 558 feet.

Jack Creek has the name of Jack Hawn, an early citizen.

== See also ==
- List of rivers of Missouri
