= Perkinstown, Wisconsin =

Unincorporated community in Wisconsin, United States

- Unincorporated community
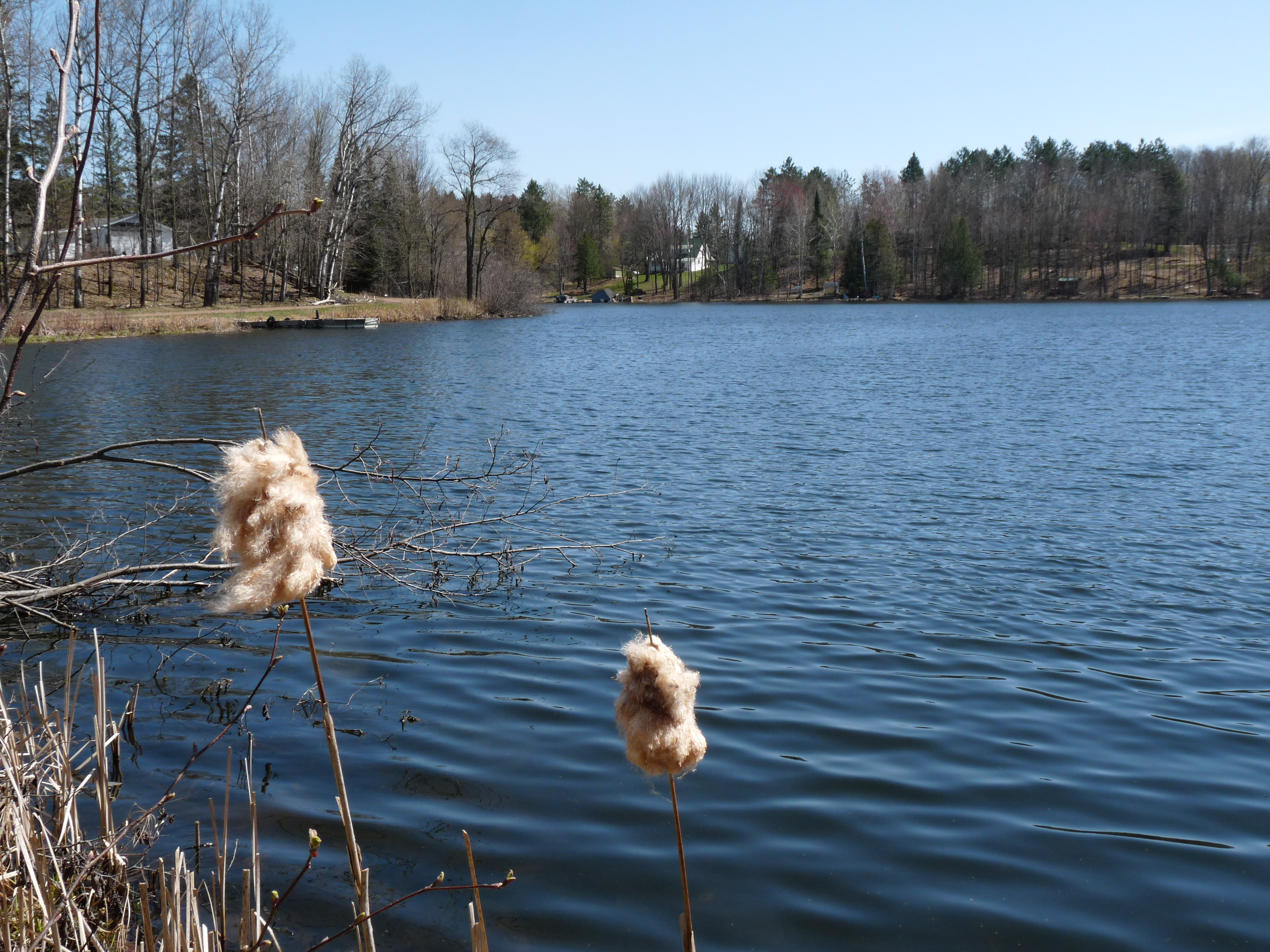
- Looking southeast across the north end of Lake Kathryn from Lake Road, in April

- Location within Wisconsin Location within the United States
- Coordinates: 45°12′15″N 90°36′53″W
- Country: United States
- State: Wisconsin
- County: Taylor
- Elevation: 1,480 ft (450 m)
- Time zone: UTC-6 (Central (CST))
  - Summer (DST): UTC-5 (CDT)
- Area codes: 715 & 534
- GNIS feature ID: 1580118

Perkinstown is an unincorporated community located in the town of Grover, Taylor County, Wisconsin, United States. The hamlet is scattered around Lake Kathryn, surrounded by Chequamegon National Forest, 10 miles (16 km) east-northeast of Gilman, reached by County Highway M and several gravel roads.

== History ==
Perkinstown lies in a band of choppy hills called the "Perkinstown terminal moraine" by geologists - hills composed of earth and rocks bulldozed by the last glacier and left mounded up where the glacier stopped advancing and began to melt back. Forests grew to cover the rough hills, dotted with little lakes, bogs and rivers. Indians hunted, fished and camped around these waterways.

Logging in the area began by 1861 when a dam was built on the Yellow River to the west. Around 1873 the Wisconsin Central Railroad built its rail line up through Medford to the east, founding that town and others along the rail line. In 1882 the first homesteaders staked their claims near what would become Perkinstown: Maurer, Richter, Westrich and Lechner. A rural school was started early on.

The village of Perkinstown was taking shape by 1891, when the Shaw family had it platted. It may have been named for a Perkins who ran an early store there, or for land agent A.J. Perkins of Medford. A sawmill, a saloon, and probably a store were in operation the year it was platted.

The Shaws had operated a leather tannery in Maine and in 1890 moved west to open a tannery in Medford. Their operation tanned leather using tannic acid from the bark of hemlock trees. Hemlock grew around Perkinstown, and it was cheaper to haul hides to remote places than to haul hemlock bark to a city. In 1892 they started another tannery just north of Lake Kathryn, with hide-drying sheds around the west side. Hides were hauled by horse and wagon from and to the railroad in Medford. With the tannery came some of the Shaws' former tannery workers from Maine and others. In addition to jobs in the tannery, the tannery also paid for hemlock bark felled and peeled at camps in the surrounding forests. Population grew to around 300 men, and stores were added, two boarding houses, and saloons. A stage carried the mail in from Medford three times a week. An 1897 article in the Medford Star and News referred to Perkinstown as "that hemlock metropolis in the wilderness."

However, not all was good. At first the tannery dumped its sludge (acid, hair, hide-trimmings) in Lake Kathryn. Boys could start working in the tannery at age 14 and possibly younger. Soon there were six saloons in the area (most concentrated on Second Avenue), and a sporting house. There were fights and murders, usually three constables, and a series of jails. A worldwide economic depression started in 1893. A fire in 1893 burned hides and one in 1896 destroyed much of the tannery, but the Shaws rebuilt. In 1900 U.S. Leather Company bought the Shaw's tanneries and closed the one at Perkinstown. New tanning processes had been found which didn't use hemlock bark, so it was no longer profitable to haul hides and chemicals to remote places like Perkinstown.

The boom years were over with the closing of the tannery and the gradual decline of logging. Many tannery workers left, but farmers and loggers remained. Perkinstown shrank to a one or two-saloon town. Churches formed and outsiders came for hunting and fishing. A 1913 map of Perkinstown shows rows of neat lots east of Lake Kathryn, noting the post office, a church and a store - and another block of lots north of the lake, with a school.

The initial pine logging was followed by hardwood logging, and much of the land around Perkinstown was scalped of trees. In flatter country, settlers bought cut-over land like this and planted crops among the stumps. But the Perkinstown moraine with its hills and swamps was more difficult to farm and much of it was not bought by farmers, remaining in the hands of lumber companies and loggers who didn't pay the taxes. Weeds and saplings grew among the treetops left from logging, and during dry periods wildfires burned swaths that threatened the few settlers. Given these problems, in 1933 the county and township agreed to give the land in the middle of the county to the federal government to manage. This "federal area" became today's Chequamegon National Forest. This was during the Great Depression, and that same year a CCC Camp was placed just south of Perkinstown. Young men lived in tents and barracks and worked partly to improve the surrounding forest, gravelling roads, building bridges, stocking lakes with fish, planting trees, cutting fire lanes, and building fire towers. They also helped build the Mondeaux Dam Recreation Area and the winter sports area.

In more recent years, many outsiders know Perkinstown chiefly for the Perkinstown Winter Sports Area. It was run by the Hannibal and Gilman FFA from the 1950s to 1970s, and now by Taylor County. The Perkinstown community still has fun with an annual Fourth of July parade, an annual snowshoe race, and the annual Perkinstown Outhouse Race.
