= Jump River (CDP), Wisconsin =

Census-designated place in Wisconsin, United States

Jump River, Wisconsin
- Census-designated place
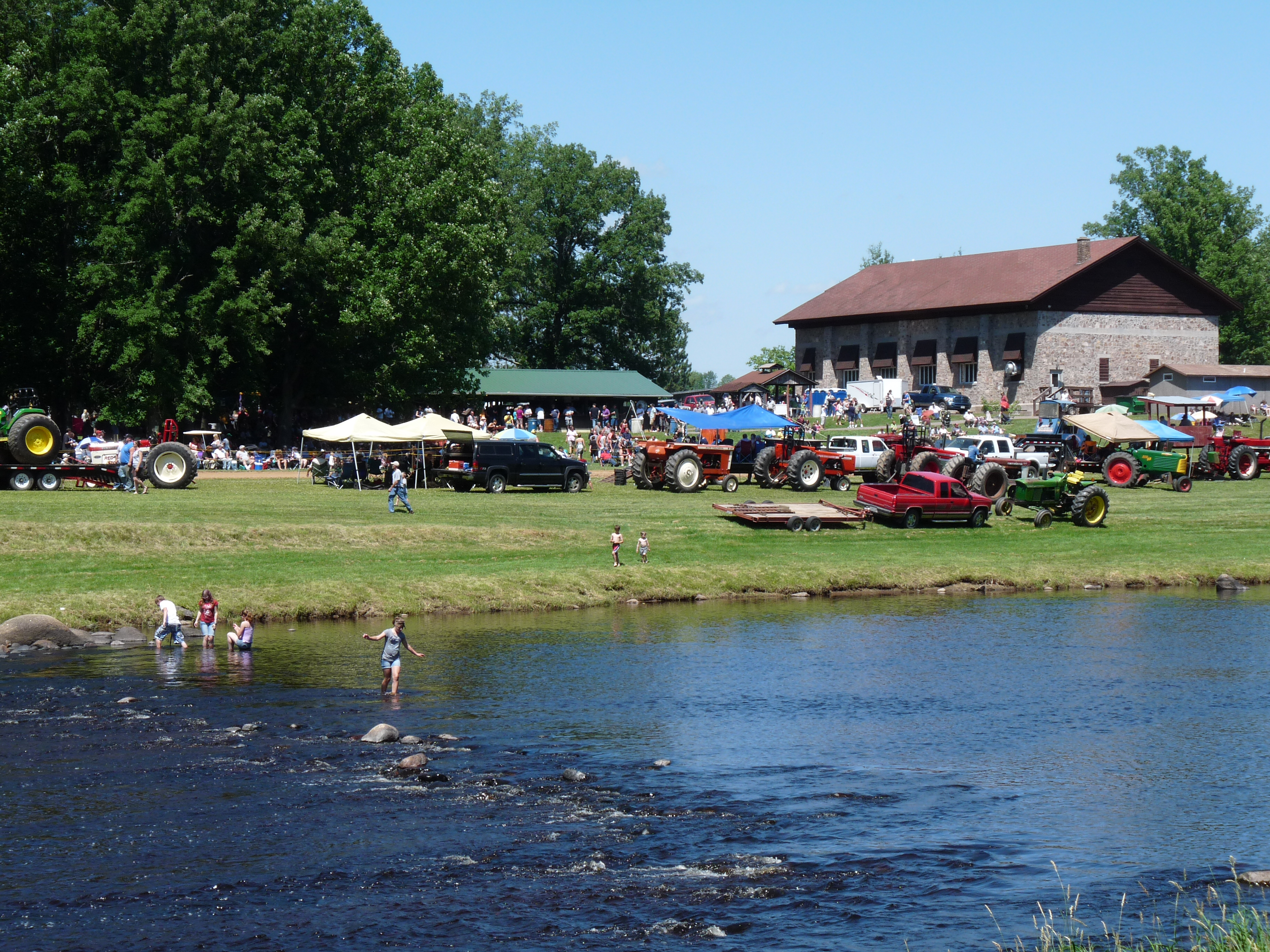
- Fourth of July, with the Jump River town hall at back right.

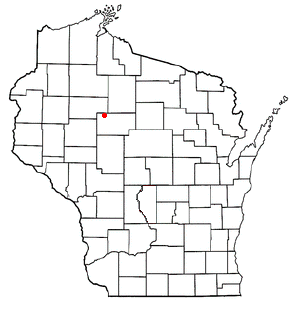
- Location of Jump River, Wisconsin
- Coordinates: 45°19′34″N 90°45′24″W
- Country: United States
- State: Wisconsin
- County: Taylor

Area
  - Total: 0.372 sq mi (0.96 km^{2})
  - Land: 0.372 sq mi (0.96 km^{2})
  - Water: 0 sq mi (0 km^{2})
- Elevation: 1,270 ft (387 m)

Population (2020)
  - Total: 53
  - Density: 140/sq mi (55/km^{2})
- Time zone: UTC-6 (Central (CST))
  - Summer (DST): UTC-5 (CDT)
- Area codes: 715 & 534
- FIPS code: 55-38627
- GNIS feature ID: 1583460

Jump River is a census-designated place in the towns of Jump River and McKinley in Taylor County, Wisconsin, United States. It is located on the north bank of the Jump River, from which the hamlet takes its name. As of the 2010 census, its population was 52.

== History ==
The first settlers in the Jump River area were Barney and Gertrude Broeder, who arrived in 1892 from Thorp, thirty miles to the south. They built a log home a mile upstream from the current village, at what is now called "the swimming hole." Starting in 1897 Barney ran a post office from his house under the name Broederville. Other settlers joined the Broeders in the area through the 1890s. A sawmill was added, a school was built nearby and in 1900 the "Black Bridge" was completed, crossing the river at Broederville. The remains of its concrete abutment can still be seen on the east bank above the swimming hole.

Until 1904, the settlers of Broederville reached the outside world by foot or horse through forest and swamp. The nearest contact with the outside was the railroad at Ingram, thirteen miles to the north. But in 1904 the Stanley, Merrill and Phillips Railway pushed up through the forest from Stanley to the south, crossing the Jump River where the town hall now stands. Within a few years, the businesses all moved a mile downstream from Broederville to the railroad.

In 1907, the village of "Jump River" was platted at its current location, where the railroad crossed the river. The streets lay as they do now. The railroad had put up some buildings, including a depot. C.J. Boeckler built a hotel called the "Jump River House" and he moved his sawmill and post office from Broederville to the new town site. The Ladies' Aid Society built a hall which has been used over the years by the Catholics, the Presbyterians, the Lutherans, the Baptists, the VFW, Boy Scouts, 4-H, and for town meetings, elections, and many other purposes. More hotels and stores and sawmills were built, saloons and garages, a blacksmith shop, a feed store, a cheese factory, and shanties and houses. At times the town had a veterinarian, a dentist, a doctor, and a jeweler.

Much of this growth was driven by logging. The S.M.&P. Railway was primarily a logging railroad, hauling logs out to sawmills at Stanley and Owen. When the timber was exhausted, little freight remained. Rail passengers also declined as roads improved. The S.M.&P. shut down in 1933. Gradually the hotels, saloons, and services thinned, but farming had taken hold in the cutover land and Jump River shifted to serving the surrounding farmers.

Formal education was done for years in a two-room schoolhouse in Jump River and one-room elementary schools scattered about the countryside: Pioneer School two miles west of Jump River, Baughman School five miles west, Sunnyside three miles southwest, Wood Prairie three miles south on highway 73, and Woodland School four miles east on County D. In 1956 the three-classroom Jump River Elementary School was built east of town, and the little country schools closed. The new school operated for about forty years, then closed in another consolidation. Since then local students have been bussed to Gilman.

In 1938, local leaders formed the Jump River Electric Cooperative, with financial support from the Rural Electrification Administration. The co-op initially provided electricity to 179 members with average consumption at 29 kilowatt hours per month. By 1944 the service area had grown and the office was moved from Jump River to Ladysmith. Though Ladysmith was more convenient, some in Jump River opposed the move, and it was begun under cover of night. Today this co-op begun by Jump River locals provides electricity, cable TV, and Internet services from Gilman to Hayward.

In 2011, Jump River is smaller, but alive. The grocery store has closed, but there is still a meat locker. Three bars remain - one also a restaurant. People worship at St. Michael's Catholic church and Christ's Community Church. The fire department protects the community and homes in the surrounding countryside. In that countryside are family farms - dairy, beef, and a few Christmas tree farms. Some people work in logging and trucking and some commute to jobs in farther places like Medford and Ladysmith. Olynick Concrete is the largest local industry. The Jump River Town Hall hosts weddings and reunions. The Fourth of July is the big event of the year, with a parade, a tractor pull, a horseshoe tournament, and evening fireworks.

== See also ==
- List of census-designated places in Wisconsin
