= Yellow River (Chippewa River tributary) =

River in Wisconsin, United States

Coordinates: 44.9644°N 91.3003°W

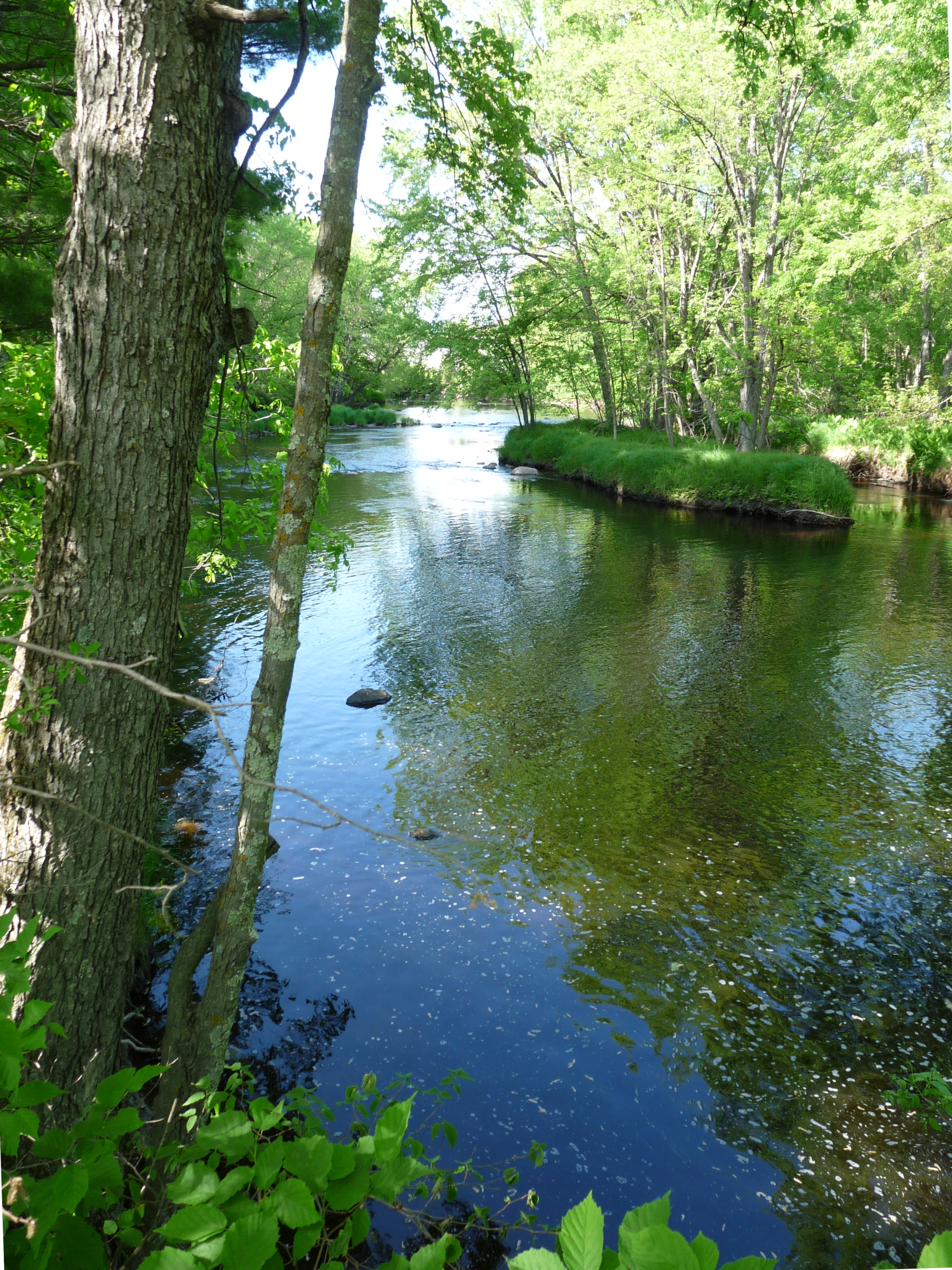
Flowing through the park in Gilman

The Yellow River in north central Wisconsin is a tributary of the Chippewa River. For the most part it is a mud and rock-bottomed river flowing through forest and farmland. It is one of four distinct rivers in the state bearing the name Yellow River.

== Geography ==
This Yellow River begins at Matt Ochs Lake and Perch Lake in the township of Molitor near Perkinstown in the Chequamegon National Forest. This area of small lakes and swamps is the terminal moraine left by the last glacier, which reached this far about 18,000 years ago. The river runs a short way before it forms Chequamegon Waters Flowage, locally known as Miller Dam. Below Miller Dam, there is one more dam, at Cadott, forming another small reservoir, before the river joins the Chippewa River when it flows into Lake Wissota at Moon Bay.

Much of the Yellow is undeveloped - in particular the upper stretches through the Chequamegon Forest. The only settlements along the river are Gilman and Cadott.

== History ==
Michel Cadotte started a trading post on the lower Yellow River at the current site of Cadott around 1787.

Logging had begun on the upper Yellow by 1861, when a log-driving dam existed at Hughey. Many such log-driving dams were built to help flush logs out. By 1880 a "winter road" followed the river all the way up to its headwaters and beyond to Westboro. This would be a "tote road," used by logging operations to supply their crews working in the forest.

Bruno Vinette, an early lumberman, tells of running a rapids on the Yellow:

I remember once when the water was very high, Gilbert and Company, on the Yellow River, needed just one crib to complete a raft and offered me twenty-five dollars to bring it down. I rigged up a couple of oars and started down alone. A lot of people stood on the bank watching to see what would happen. Instead of giving me any trouble, the crib floated like a cork. I did not have to touch the oars, and in a few minutes was safe below the falls.

== Recreation ==
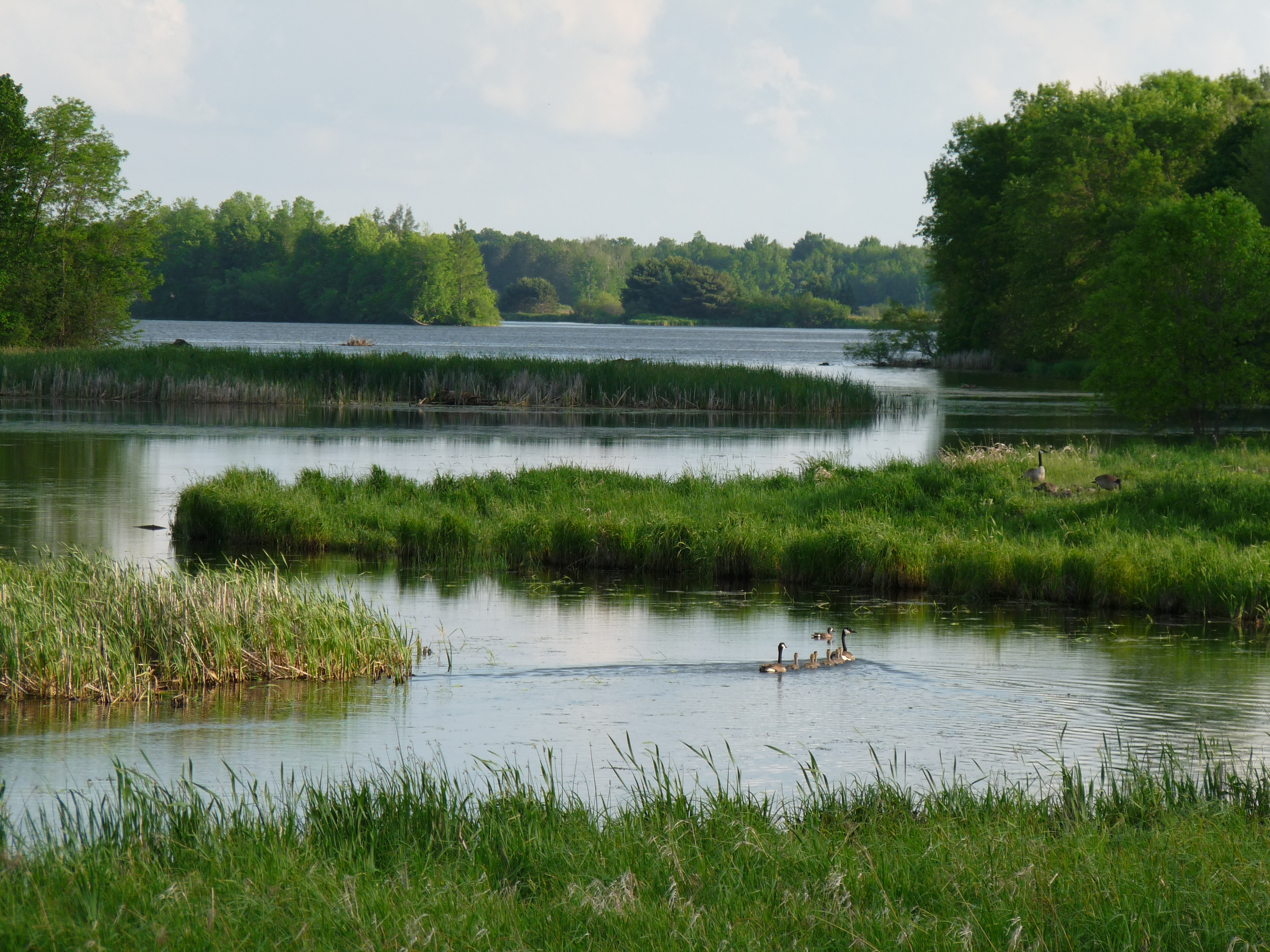
Chequamegon Waters, a.k.a. Miller Dam Flowage, is a man-made reservoir on the upper Yellow.

Chequamegon Waters above Gilman is a popular spot for fishing for bluegills, crappies, large mouth bass, northern pike, perch and the occasional walleye and smallmouth bass. The most common catch in the river is the northern pike and suckers. Wildlife abounds around the river including deer, bear, wolves, bobcat, coyote, ruffed grouse, beaver, otter, muskrat, mink, raccoon, turkey and waterfowl.

Canoeing can be good below Chequamegon Waters if water levels are somewhat high. Above Chequamagon Waters, the water must be higher. The Oxbow Rapids below Gilman is a series of Class I-II boulder gardens.

== Bend deposit ==
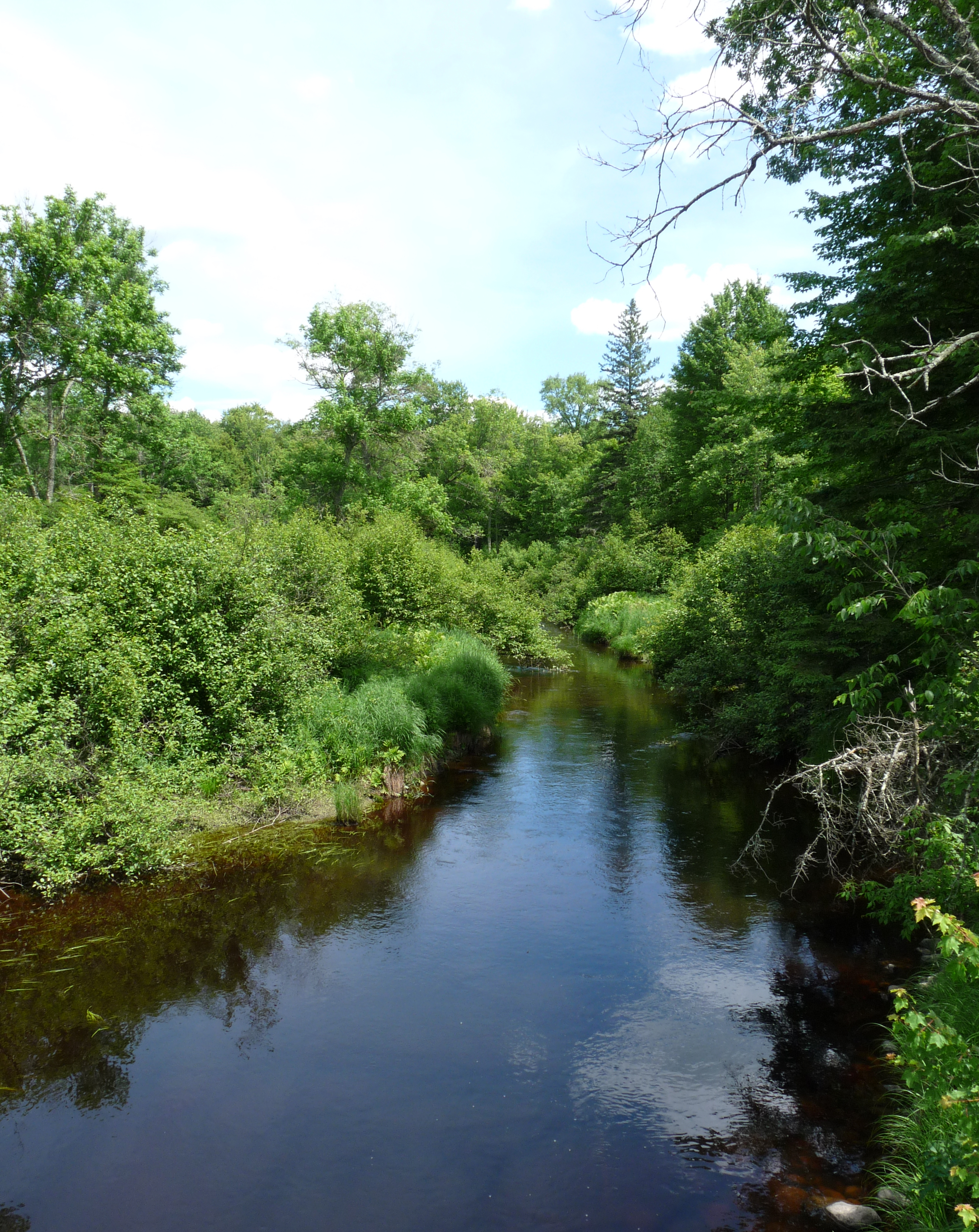
From the bridge on Yellow River Road in the Chequamegon National Forest, facing upstream, a hundred yards north of the Bend Project site

Six miles north of Perkinstown, Bend is an unmined sulfide ore deposit lying beneath the forest a few hundred yards from the north fork of the Yellow River - an estimated 4 million tons of ore bearing mostly copper with significant gold and minor amounts of silver. It was discovered in 1986 - one of a line of potential valuable deposits that roughly follow the course of Highway 8 across northern Wisconsin. The Flambeau Mine south of Ladysmith is the only one mined so far.

As of 2026, GreenLight Wisconsin is drilling exploratory holes in the forest at Bend to better understand the extent and composition of the deposit. The mineral rights are owned by the Bureau of Land Management and Soo Line Railroad. Tribal and environment groups are concerned about the proximity to the river and wetlands and to Indian cultural sites nearby, and the possibility of actual mining.

== See also ==
- See Logging on the Chippewa for an overview of 19th century logging in the Chippewa watershed.
