= Ladysmith, Wisconsin =

- City
- Location of Ladysmith in Rusk County, Wisconsin.

- Location within Wisconsin Location within the United States
- Coordinates: 45°27′50″N 91°6′0″W
- Country: United States
- State: Wisconsin
- County: Rusk

Government
  - Mayor: Robert Grotzinger

Area
  - Total: 4.59 sq mi (11.90 km^{2})
  - Land: 4.22 sq mi (10.93 km^{2})
  - Water: 0.37 sq mi (0.97 km^{2})
- Elevation: 1,145 ft (349 m)

Population (2020)
  - Total: 3,216
  - Density: 762/sq mi (294.2/km^{2})
- Time zone: UTC-6 (Central (CST))
  - Summer (DST): UTC-5 (CDT)
- ZIP code: 54848
- Area codes: 715 & 534
- FIPS code: 55-40850
- GNIS feature ID: 1567715
- Website: www.cityofladysmithwi.com

Ladysmith is a city and the county seat of Rusk County, Wisconsin, United States, where U.S. Route 8 and Wisconsin Highway 27 meet and cross the Flambeau River. The population was 3,216 at the 2020 census.

The town has transitioned from logging in the 1800s to a 2025 economy dominated by manufacturing, then healthcare and social assistance, retail, and public administration.

== History ==
=== Pre-settlement ===
Native Americans passed up and down the Flambeau River for thousands of years, fishing and hunting through the forest that would become Ladysmith. The Ojibwe were the last group to dominate the area, before the U.S. forced them to cede their land rights to most of northern Wisconsin in the White Pine Treaty of 1837. They called the area that would become Ladysmith Gakaabikijiwanan - "waterfalls overflowing the rocks."

U.S. surveyors arrived in 1852, walking through the woods and swamps, using chain and compass to find the section corners. The deputy surveyor filed this general description of the six-mile square that contains the north half of Ladysmith:

This Township contains considerable Tamarac swamp passing from North East to South West. In the North West of the Township there is some good Pine on the small streams. Flambeau River enters the Township in section 25 and leaves it in section 35. Rapid current, high and dry banks, not subject to inundation, bed stoney. Some good Pine on and near the stream. No particular fall or Rapid(?).

=== Settlement ===
The first settler at what is now Ladysmith was the French-Canadian lumberman Bruno Vinette. He ran logging camps in the area in the 1860s and by 1872 had cut out a farm on the Flambeau River west of the modern Tee-A-Way golf course. He kept his oxen, horses, and logging equipment at this wilderness outpost during the summers, and grew crops to supply his camps. Eventually he built a ferry across the river and a backwoods hotel to serve people (mostly loggers) traveling up and down the river. Behind the hotel was a dugout jail for those made unruly by the liquor Vinette sold.

In 1885 the Minneapolis, St. Paul and Sault Ste. Marie Railroad (Soo Line) reached what would become Ladysmith, building track east to connect the grain of the Twin Cities with the port at Sault Ste. Marie. They established a station called Flambeau Falls on high ground near the Flambeau River, and platted a village around it with the same name. In 1888 they renamed the station Warner, possibly for some railroad official.

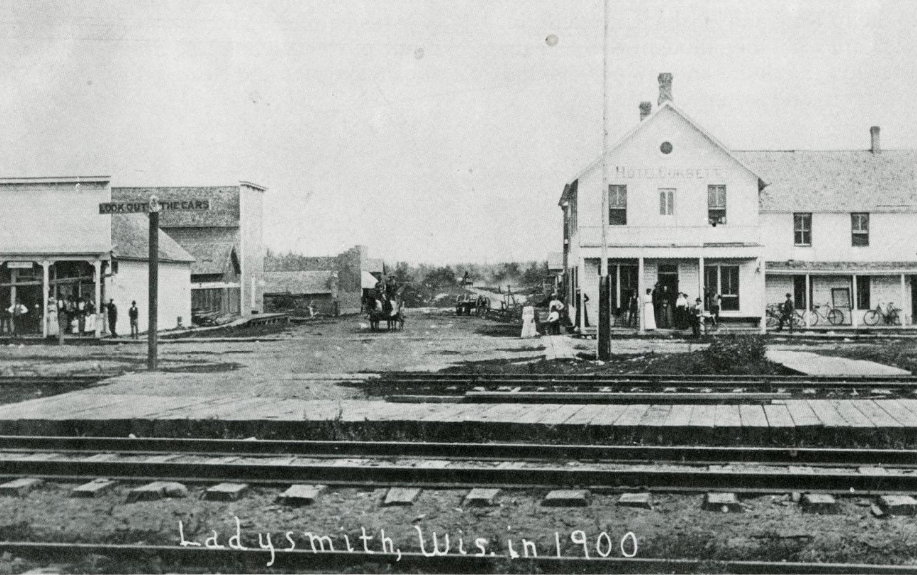
Downtown in 1900, with the Soo Line in foreground, Hotel Corbett on the right, and Fritz's store on the left.

Robert Corbett moved his sawmill and his family from Shell Lake to Flambeau Falls in early 1886. At that time, the town's only improvements were a hotel that Vinette was building, and probably a depot, a section foreman's house, and John Lindoo's saloon - all among the stumps. The Corbetts bought the hotel and operated it as the Hotel Corbett, and Robert set up his sawmill on the north side of what is now called Corbett Lake - the first industry in Flambeau Falls. The sawmill burned soon after, but Corbett rebuilt. His mill sawed much of the wood that built the town's earliest buildings. A post office named Corbett was established in 1887 in the hotel, with Robert the postmaster. The third floor of the hotel was partitioned into one or two large rooms where lumberjacks slept, called the "ram's pasture." The hotel also hosted church services and the first school in town about 1888, with 12 students taught by Mary Grandmaitre of Flambeau Farm.

J.W. Fritz opened Ladymith's first store in 1888, where City Hall now stands. A one-room school was built in 1888 or 1889. That was replaced by a two-room school in 1897. Corbett added a boarding house to his ventures. His sawmill burned again in 1898 and was rebuilt. The first doctor set up shop in 1898, and the first drug store in 1899. The first newspaper, The Weekly Journal, began publishing in 1900. Worden's Opera House also opened that year. And W.O. King began the first organized church services, preaching to a mixed congregation of Methodists, Church of Christ, and Congregationalists.

=== Factories and city organization ===
In 1900 Menasha Wooden Ware began building its stave and heading mill along with a blacksmith shop and boarding house for workers. The company had been buying timber upstream to supply its mill and built the dam nearby to power it. Charles Smith, the president of Menasha Wooden Ware, was about to marry Neenah socialite Isabel Bacon Rogers, and in 1900 Warner changed its name to Ladysmith to honor the couple. (This name may have also been influenced by the Siege of Ladysmith in South Africa, which was in the news at the same time.) Back at the Flambeau River, the stave and heading mill was supplied by spring log drives and shipped sawed barrel staves to MWW's main plant in Menasha. The operation was successful enough that the factory was expanded twice in 1901. Menasha Paper built its paper and pulp mill nearby soon after. With all the new manufacturing jobs, Ladysmith's population surged from 136 in 1900 to 1,700 in 1905. Despite the name-change, Charles Smith's new wife probably never visited Ladysmith.

When the Gerard hotel was built in 1901, it was touted as "the most modern and complete hotel between Minneapolis and Rhinelander" - stylish architecture, with a nice dining room, steam heat, views of the river, and boat rentals and ice cream down at the riverbank. The following year it added electric lights.

On November 24, 1901, what started as a chimney fire engulfed and destroyed much of Ladysmith's downtown. When one fire company ran out of water, they saved a saloon by dousing the flames in beer.

In 1901, with things starting to boom, Rusk County (initially called Gates County) was split out from Chippewa County. Locals had grumbled for years about the difficulty to reach the county seat at Chippewa Falls. Bruce and Apollonia, older towns, had jockeyed to be the county seat, but by 1901 Ladysmith was the largest town and better centered, so it became county seat. The new county had been proposed to be named in honor of Governor Rusk, but his son argued against splitting Chippewa County, so the county was first named Gates County for Milwaukee land salesman James L. Gates, who had bought a lot of surrounding land from lumber companies. The county courthouse was built at Ladysmith in the winter of 1901-1902. In 1905 the state legislature renamed the county Rusk, claiming that James Gates had failed to come through with $10,000 he had promised for the naming honor. Whether this is true is unclear, since he had some enemies in the legislature.

The 1897 two-room school was soon outgrown and a larger school was built to replace it in 1902, called the "High School" or the "West Side" school. It started out offering grades one through nine. But it was soon full too, so the two-room school was put back into service, and classes were also held in the Baptist church. A full high school course began in 1904.

Ladysmith had incorporated as a village in 1901, choosing E.M. Worden as the first village president. After drastic growth, the village incorporated as a city in 1905, with its first mayor R.S. Johnson, also the manager of the Menasha Wooden Ware factory at the time. With the early plank boardwalks replaced by concrete, Ladysmith was modernizing.

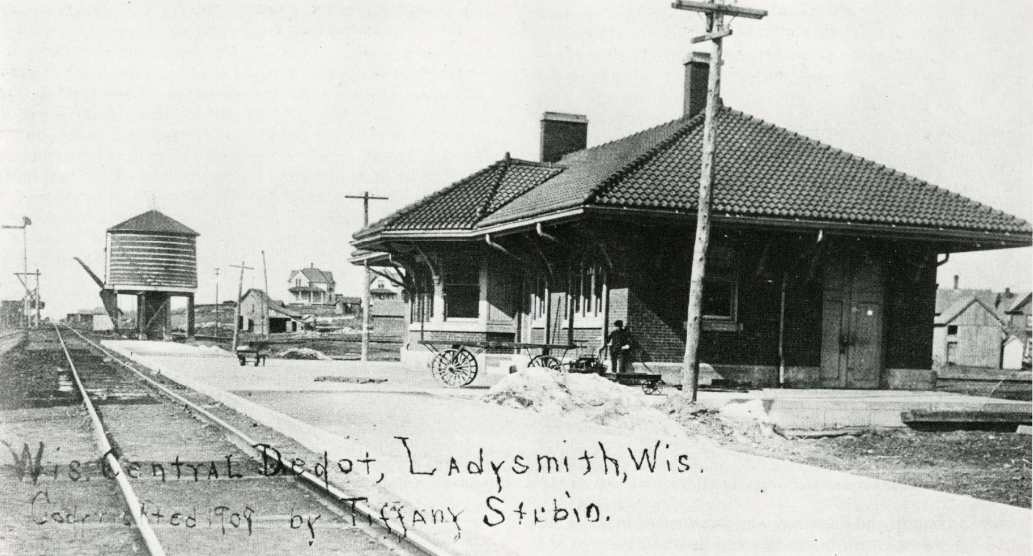
Wisconsin Central depot in 1909

A second rail line had been rumored for years and in 1905 that became a reality when the Wisconsin Central line was built from the southeast, connecting Ladysmith fairly directly to Milwaukee, Chicago, and Superior. In 1906 the WC added a depot, a turntable, and a watchtower to coordinate trains where it crossed the Soo Line. Passenger service ran until 1965.

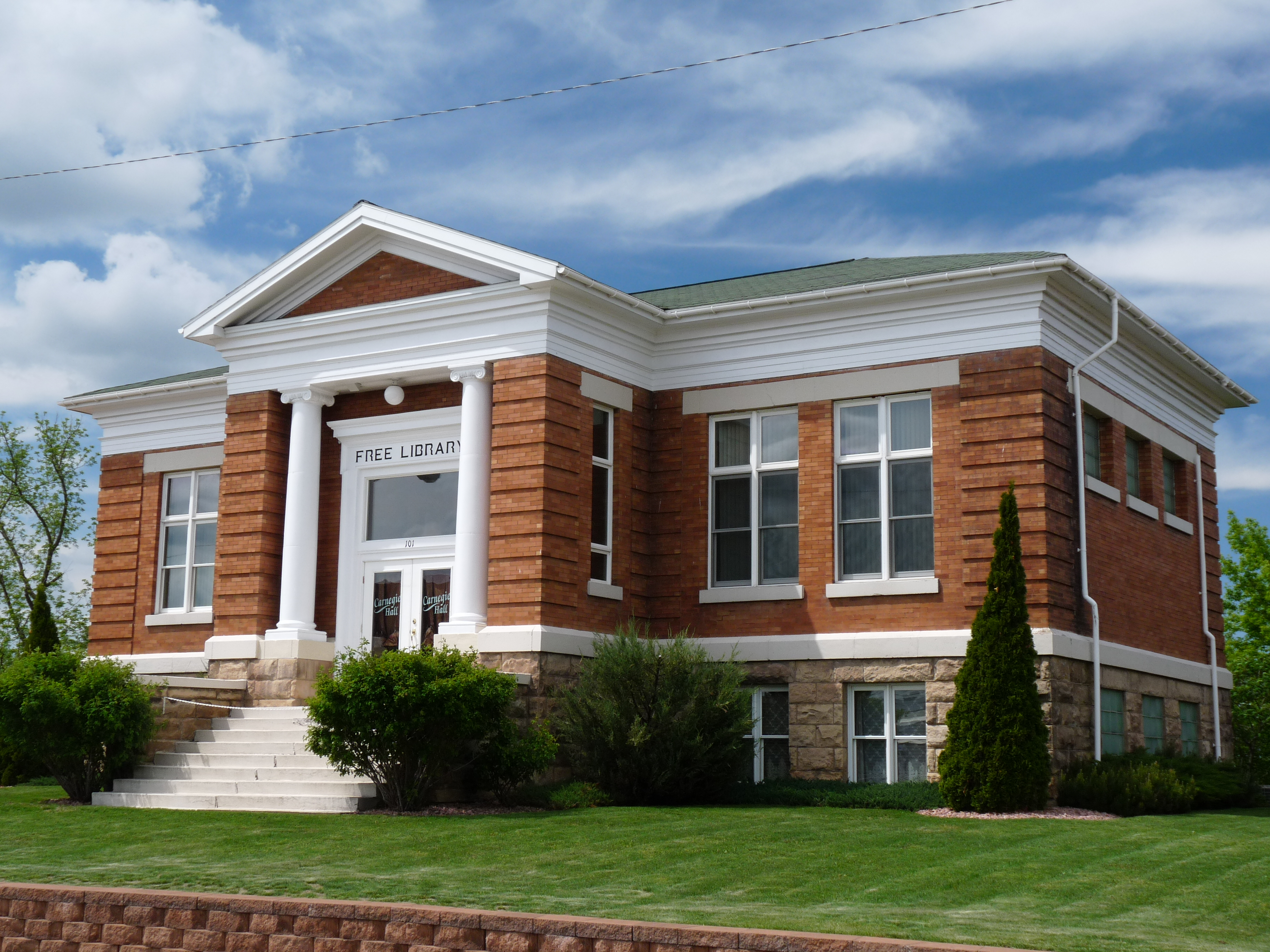
Carnegie library, built 1907

A public library was begun in 1906 in a small wooden building, with 484 books to lend. The following year the city received a Carnegie grant to help build a new library, which still stands.

The Rusk County Training School for Teachers opened in 1907, charged with training teachers for the elementary rural and state graded schools in the area. Its classes met in the basement of the public library until it had its own building in 1911, near the present Hope Lutheran Church.

The First Ward school (Blue School) was added in 1908 and the Catholic School in 1912. Crowding got worse after the state required attendance to age 14 in 1910, so a new high school building was added on East 6th Street in 1915. Crowding and building continued.

In 1909 the Flambeau River Lumber Company bought an old sawmill with rotary saws from Corbett and began building a large modern sawmill to the east, on the north bank of the Flambeau. The new mill had bandsaws and a system of conveyors which reduced hand labor. Then boards went to a planer before the curing piles. The mill employed 120 men on each of two shifts, and sawed a half million feet of lumber per week. The mill retailed some lumber from its yard, but shipped most of it out by rail. Sawing continued until 1926, when FRLC lost its ability to drive logs down the river and its timber supply was running out.

Ladysmith voted to be dry in 1915, five years before nationwide prohibition, then reversed that the following year.

In 1916 the Fountain-Campbell Lumber Company started another large sawmill at Ladysmith, moving its existing equipment north from Donald where the timber had run out to north of Ladysmith's current elementary school. The mill started operation next spring, with 50 men in the mill sawing logs cut on the reservation at Couderay and hauled by FC's own logging railroad to Ladysmith.

A pest house had been built during a smallpox outbreak in 1904, across the river from the current hospital and clinic. An actual hospital wasn't built until 1917. St. Mary's Hospital was near the current location along the river and managed by Sisters. The hospital opened a nursing school the next year.

With the closing of the Teacher Training School/Normal school in 1948, the Sisters Servants of Mary needed a way to train Sister teachers, so they opened Our Lady of Sorrows Junior College in the convent in 1952. This evolved into Mount Senario College, a four-year liberal arts college which opened in 1962. The school closed in 2002.

=== Recent history ===
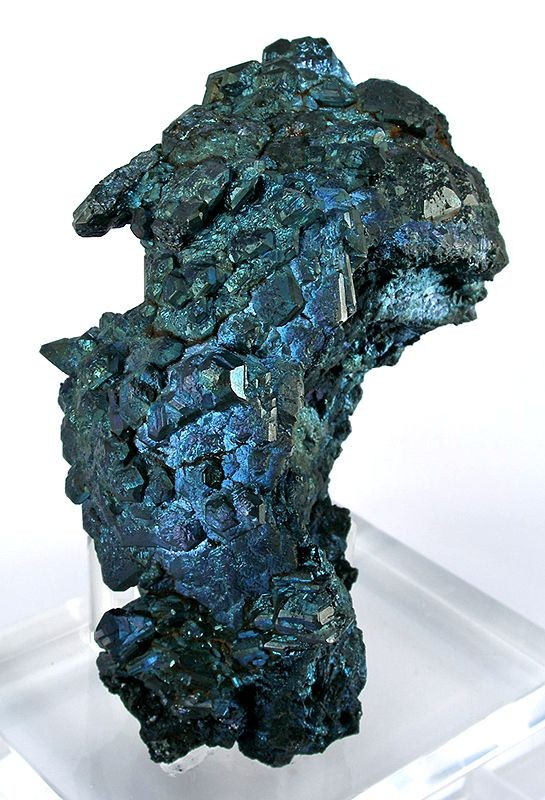
Steely-blue chalcocite from the Flambeau Mine

In 1968 a significant copper-gold deposit was discovered south of Ladysmith next to the Flambeau River. After years of test holes, proposals, opposition, and revised plans, a Kennecott subsidiary got approval in 1991. The Flambeau Copper Mine was an open pit mine operated from 1993 to 1997. This was a very rich volcanogenic massive sulfide ore deposit, so rich that the ore was shipped directly to the smelter. Flambeau Mine has since been closed and the site reclaimed and planted. It now has walking trails.

A tornado rated at F3 strength destroyed much of Ladysmith's downtown area on September 2, 2002. Overall damage was estimated at $20 million, but there were no fatalities.

The gun that Kyle Rittenhouse used on May 1, 2020 was bought by Dominick Black at the Ace Hardware store in Ladysmith - a Smith & Wesson M&P 15 rifle. This rifle would later be fired by 17-year-old Rittenhouse during unrest in Kenosha following the shooting of Jacob Blake. Black purchased the weapon using money given to him by Rittenhouse, and had an agreement that Kyle would take possession of the rifle when he turned 18.

== Geography ==
Ladysmith is located at 45°27′50″N 91°6′0″W. According to the United States Census Bureau, the city has an area of 4.59 square miles (11.89 km^{2}), of which 4.21 square miles (10.90 km^{2}) is land and 0.38 square miles (0.98 km^{2}) is water.

U.S. Highway 8 and Wisconsin Highway 27 are the main routes in the community.

Ladysmith is situated along the Flambeau River.

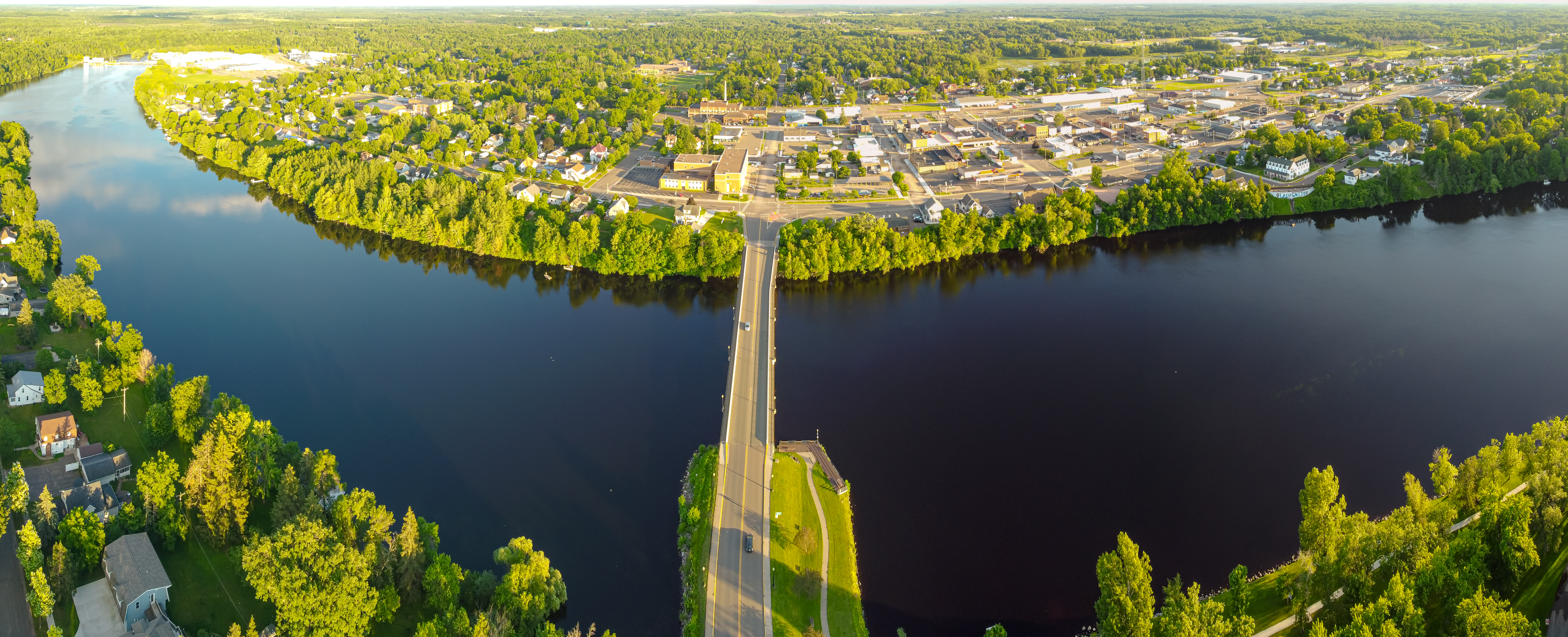

== Demographics ==
Historical population
Census	Pop.	Note	%±
1910	2,352		—
1920	3,581		52.3%
1930	3,493		−2.5%
1940	3,671		5.1%
1950	3,924		6.9%
1960	3,584		−8.7%
1970	3,674		2.5%
1980	3,826		4.1%
1990	3,938		2.9%
2000	3,932		−0.2%
2010	3,414		−13.2%
2020	3,216		−5.8%
U.S. Decennial Census

=== 2010 census ===
As of the census of 2010, there were 3,414 people, 1,527 households, and 806 families living in the city. The population density was 810.9 inhabitants per square mile (313.1/km^{2}). There were 1,667 housing units at an average density of 396.0 per square mile (152.9/km^{2}). The racial makeup of the city was 96.3% White, 0.6% African American, 0.8% Native American, 0.6% Asian, 0.5% from other races, and 1.2% from two or more races. Hispanic or Latino of any race were 1.6% of the population.

There were 1,527 households, of which 26.1% had children under the age of 18 living with them, 37.1% were married couples living together, 10.7% had a female householder with no husband present, 5.0% had a male householder with no wife present, and 47.2% were non-families. 41.7% of all households were made up of individuals, and 20.2% had someone living alone who was 65 years of age or older. The average household size was 2.14 and the average family size was 2.86.

The median age in the city was 43.8 years. 22.3% of residents were under the age of 18; 7% were between the ages of 18 and 24; 21.9% were from 25 to 44; 25.7% were from 45 to 64; and 23% were 65 years of age or older. The gender makeup of the city was 45.6% male and 54.4% female.

=== 2000 census ===
As of the census of 2000, there were 3,932 people, 1,570 households, and 916 families living in the city. The population density was 1,008.9 people per square mile (389.3/km^{2}). There were 1,660 housing units at an average density of 425.9 per square mile (164.3/km^{2}). The racial makeup of the city was 96.31% White, 1.48% African American, 0.56% Native American, 0.48% Asian, 0.13% Pacific Islander, 0.10% from other races, and 0.94% from two or more races. Hispanic or Latino of any race were 0.76% of the population.

There were 1,570 households, out of which 28.2% had children under the age of 18 living with them, 43.4% were married couples living together, 11.0% had a female householder with no husband present, and 41.6% were non-families. 35.8% of all households were made up of individuals, and 19.2% had someone living alone who was 65 years of age or older. The average household size was 2.25 and the average family size was 2.92.

In the city, the population was spread out, with 22.8% under the age of 18, 13.4% from 18 to 24, 23.7% from 25 to 44, 18.7% from 45 to 64, and 21.4% who were 65 years of age or older. The median age was 37 years. For every 100 females there were 87.4 males. For every 100 females age 18 and over, there were 83.3 males.

The median income for a household in the city was $28,274, and the median income for a family was $40,526. Males had a median income of $26,725 versus $20,826 for females. The per capita income for the city was $15,499. About 7.2% of families and 12.2% of the population were below the poverty line, including 11.1% of those under age 18 and 11.0% of those age 65 or over.

== Transportation ==
Rusk County Airport (KRCX) serves Ladysmith.

The Rusk County Transit Commission provides transportation within Rusk County.

== Education ==
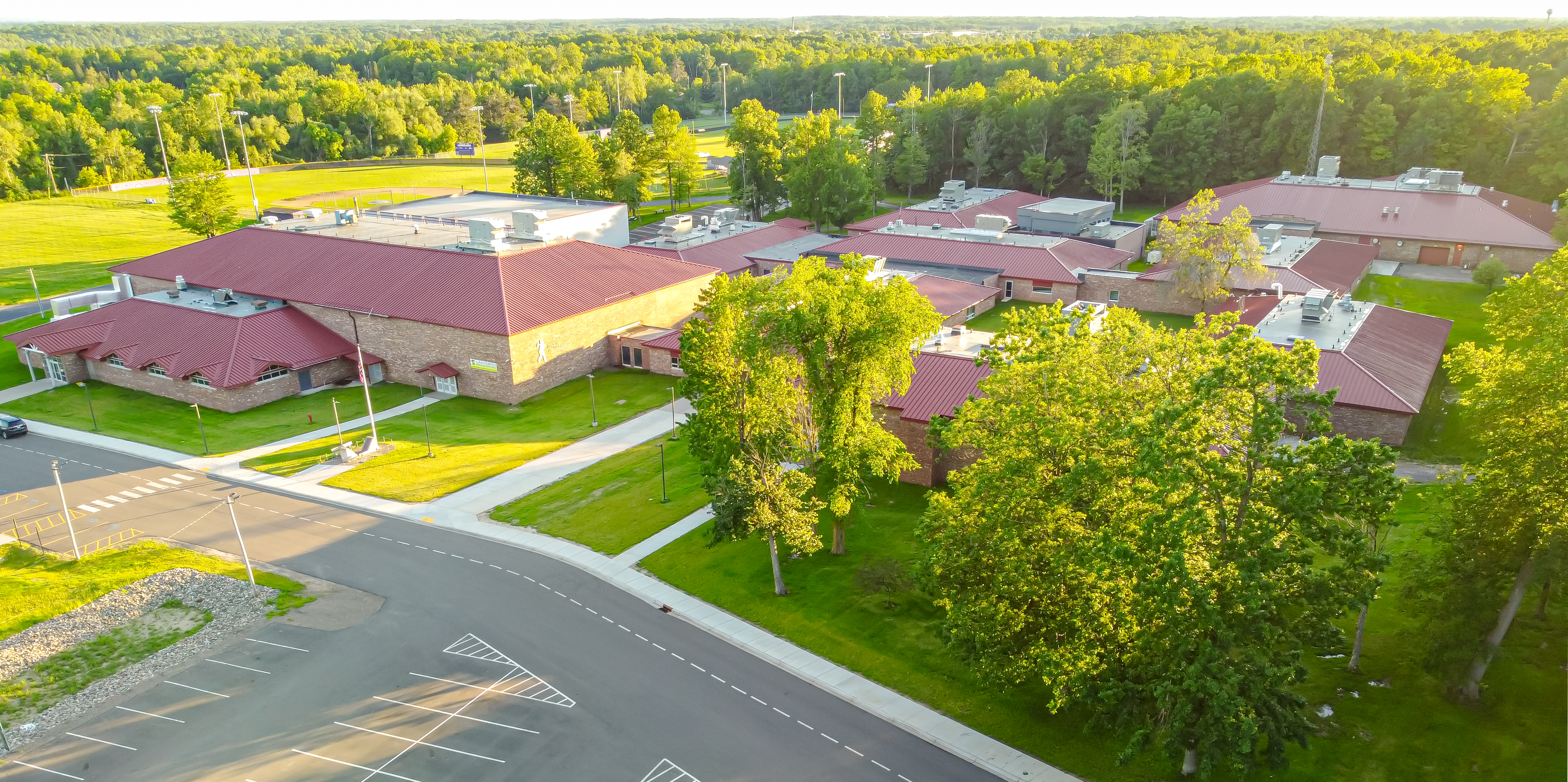
Ladysmith High School

Ladysmith is served by the Ladysmith School District, which administers Ladysmith High School and Ladysmith Elementary School. Ladysmith is also home to private schools Our Lady of Sorrows, a Catholic grade school, and North Cedar Academy, a private college prep International boarding high school, providing "BluGold" study program, which allows students to earn up to 60 college credits within the high school.

Ladysmith was the home of Mount Senario College, which closed in 2002. In the 2006–07 school year, part of the former campus was operated as Concordia Preparatory School, a private Christian high school. That institution also faced financial problems and closed. Silver Lake College of Manitowoc, Wisconsin, began offering courses at Mount Senario, renamed Mount Senario Education Center, in September 2009. Silver Lake itself closed in 2020, and North Cedar Academy now occupies Mount Senario's old campus, passed on its collaboration with the UW System and provides "BluGold" Guarantee Transfer Program.

== Notable people ==
- Gary Beecham, artist
- Lois Capps, member of the United States House of Representatives from California
- Jorge A. Carow, Wisconsin State Assembly
- Mark Hayes, composer and arranger
- Donald J. Hoffman, Air Force 4-star general
- Ron Kovic, author, Vietnam War veteran
- Jim Leonhard, NFL player
- Earl Maves, NFL player
- A. R. Morlan (1958–2016), author
- Martin Reynolds, mayor of Ladysmith, Wisconsin State Assembly
- Dell H. Richards, Mayor of Ladysmith, Wisconsin State Assembly
- Kathleen Slattery-Moschkau, filmmaker

== See also ==
- List of cities in Wisconsin
