= Mount Senario College =

Private college in Ladysmith, Wisconsin, US

- Type: Private
- Active: 1930–2002
- Location: 1500 W College Ave; Ladysmith, Wisconsin 54848, Ladysmith, Wisconsin, United States; 45°27′20.5″N 91°07′12.0″W
- Campus: Rural
- Colors: Blue and Gold
- Nickname: Fighting Saints

Mount Senario College (MSC or Mt. Senario) was a private non-profit college located in Ladysmith, Wisconsin, in the Diocese of Superior.

== History ==
=== Early history ===
The College began in 1930, when summer extension courses were conducted in Ladysmith for the Servants of Mary (Servite Sisters) by Eau Claire State Teachers College (now University of Wisconsin–Eau Claire). In 1952, courses were expanded to a junior college affiliated with the College of St. Scholastica.

Ten years later, the Servants of Mary established Mount Senario College as a four-year college. Enrollment was open to the public and emphasis was placed on teacher training. The college was named after Monte Senario, the birthplace of the Servite Order, near Florence, Italy. In 1963, it received approval for certification of elementary teachers by the Wisconsin Department of Public Instruction; approval for secondary certification was received in 1965.

Mount Senario College became a non-sectarian institution in 1972, when a plan for the reorganization of the school was adopted by the board of trustees and approved by the Servants of Mary. The college was granted academic accreditation by the North Central Association of Colleges and Schools in 1975. Mount Senario had 28 satellite locations serving students mostly in the areas of criminal justice, public administration, business administration and liberal arts.

Main campus

The main campus consisted of two major buildings. The largest was the college, consisting of college administration, library, bookstore, cafeteria, lecture hall, several classrooms, chemistry laboratory, biology laboratory and physics laboratory. Adjacent to the college building was the dormitory.

Fine arts campus

The fine arts campus was located a half mile east of the main campus, on the corner of Wisconsin Highway 27 and College Avenue, and consisted of one building. It had originally been erected in 1959 for Our Lady of Sorrows High School, which eventually became Servite High. When that facility closed in 1967, the building became the Fine Arts Center for Mount Senario College. This building housed MSC's music and art programs. The college used the gymnasium as a multi-functional space for basketball games, concerts and other large public gatherings.

=== Later history ===
Mount Senario closed on August 31, 2002 as a result of financial trouble. The college had been in poor financial health that was exacerbated by mismanagement and corruption involving school president Norman Stewart. This ultimately led to the school's closing. The city of Ladysmith offered some financial assistance (purchasing the athletic fields); however, it was not enough to save "The Mount".

By court action, official student transcripts became the responsibility of the State of Wisconsin Educational Approval Board in August 2003. The transcript responsibility was transferred in December 2005 to The Wisconsin Association of Independent Colleges and Universities.

=== Since closing ===
For the 2006–07 school year, part of the former campus was operated as Concordia Preparatory School, a private Christian preparatory school. That institution also faced financial problems and closed midseason. Silver Lake College of Manitowoc, Wisconsin began offering courses at Mount Senario, renamed "Mount Senario Education Center", beginning September, 2009. Silver Lake (later Silver Lake College of the Holy Family) itself closed down in 2020.

== Athletics ==
The school colors were blue and gold, with the athletic teams named the Fighting Saints. Prior to the school suspending all athletics in December 2001, the school was a member of the Upper Midwest Athletic Conference.

== Notable people ==
- A. R. Morlan (1958–2016), author
