= A. R. Morlan =

American writer (1958–2016)

- Born: Arlette Renee Morlan; January 3, 1958; Chicago, Illinois, U.S.
- Died: January 4/5, 2016 (aged 58); Ladysmith, Wisconsin, U.S.
- Education: Mount Senario College
- Occupations: novelist; short story writer
- Writing career
- Pen name: Renee M. Charles; Ana Rose Morlan; Karl-Rene Moore
- Genres: horror; science fiction; vampire; erotica; gay erotica

A. R. Morlan (January 3, 1958 – January 4/5, 2016; née, Arlette Renee Morlan, later, Ana Rose Morlan; pseudonyms Renee M. Charles, Ana Rose Morlan, and Karl-Rene Moore) was an American author of novels and short stories whose works of fiction have appeared in various magazines and anthologies. She wrote in a number of genres, including horror, science fiction, vampire, erotica, and gay erotica.

== Early life ==
Morlan was born in Chicago, Illinois, January 3, 1958. From 1961 to 1969, she lived in Los Angeles, California. Morlan described a troubled childhood in a 2014 interview. Her mother and maternal grandmother had isolated her and terrorized her. After Morlan's mother lost custody of Arlette, the mother took Arlette to a different state and for fifty years, Arlette was out of contact with her father.

Morlan graduated from Mount Senario College in Ladysmith, Wisconsin, in 1980.

== Career ==
"My VERY bible-belt relatives–they don't even know who/'what' Harry Potter is!!– have said to me that they wish they could make my erotica [and horror and sf too] just 'go away' which is why I'm planning to formally disinherit all of them in my will! I can't stand them!" (A. R. Morlan, quoted in Circlet, 2016)

Morlan's first story, "Four Days Before the Snow", was published in 1985. Her story "Yet Another Poisoned Apple for the Princess" appeared in a well-reviewed anthology, The Year's Best Fantasy and Horror (1994), alongside works by Neil Gaiman, Ellen Datlow, Geoffrey Landis, and Terri Windling. Her gender-bending short story "The Best Lives of Our Years", published in Full Spectrum 4, made the nomination list before the cutoff for the 1993 Tiptree Award and has been taught in college courses as an example of revisionary science fiction.

Many of Morlan's early stories were set in Ewerton, an imaginary small town in Wisconsin similar to Ladysmith where Morlan attended college and lived. Bantam Books saw the potential in this setting and in 1991 Morlan published two novels with them, The Amulet and Dark Journey. In addition a novella in the same series was released that year by Pulphouse.

The novels "confirmed the promise of Morlan's short fiction and demonstrated that — unlike many other writers of finely-crafted short stories — she could extend the sensibility of her work into a sustained narrative crescendo." However, Morlan endured a lot of editorial interference from Bantam with Dark Journey along with substantial cuts to the text. According to Brian Stableford, "there is no other book quite like Dark Journey. Unfortunately, the uniqueness of a tour de force is not much help to a publisher's marketing department."

Morlan was a finalist for the Tiptree Award in 1998, for "The Hetairai Turncoat", published under the pseudonym Karl-Rene Moore.

In the 1990s, she worked for the Writer's Digest as an instructor for correspondence courses, but with a changing market brought on by technology, she was dropped by this employer. Morlan had "no computer, no Internet, and no cell phone". She also did not have a driver's license. Describing herself as being "totally computer illiterate", she worked on a typewriter and used carbon paper to produce a duplicate copy of her writings.

By 2000, Morlan had published 93 works of short fiction. Several of her collections were published, such as Smothered Dolls (2006), Ewerton Death Trip (2011), and Homely in the Cradle and Other Stories (2015). She used various pen names for her science fiction and horror works, including Renee M. Charles and Ana Rose Morlan, eventually changing her legal name to the latter. Her erotica works were published as Renee M. Charles, while her gay erotica publications were under the pseudonym, Karl-Rene Moore. Morlan was influenced by Mary Shelley, Ursula K. Le Guin, and Alice Sheldon.

== Critical response ==
Brian Stableford described Morlan's fiction as "genuinely discomfiting in a fashion that many horror writers attempt but few achieve."

Morlan's story "The Second Most Beautiful Woman in the World" was called by Kirkus Reviews "a genuinely haunting tribute to the spirit of Georgia O'Keeffe." Publishers Weekly described her story "The Hemingway Kittens" as having a Twilight Zone twist that "serves up a surprising amount of whimsy." In reference to the erotica story "Merle O., Sgt. Bottum, and the Park Fairies" (1998), which plays with themes from A Midsummer Night's Dream, Morlan was described as taking "a charming tack that owes as much to Wambaugh as it does to Shakespeare." The author's biography for this story, published under the named Karl-Rene Moore, uses masculine pronouns.

== Personal life ==
Morlan had dyslexia, post-traumatic stress disorder and Asperger syndrome. She cared for dozens of cats at a time. In mid-2015, she was charged with cashing her mother's social security checks dating back to 2011.

Morlan was found dead at her home in Ladysmith, Wisconsin, on January 6, 2016, in an apparent suicide, which occurred one or two days before. She was 58.

== Selected works ==
- Dark Journey, Bantam Spectra, 1991, ISBN 0-553-29152-1
- The Amulet, Bantam Books, 1991, ISBN 0-553-28908-X
- Smothered Dolls, Overlook Connection Press, 2006, ISBN 1-892950-71-5
- Ewerton Death Trip: A Walk Through the Dark Side of Town, Borgo Press / Wildside Press, 2011, ISBN 978-1-4344-1238-6
- Rillas and Other Science Fiction Stories, Borgo Press / Wildside Press, 2012, ISBN 978-1-4344-4427-1
- Of Vampires & Gentlemen: Tales of Erotic Horror, Borgo Press / Wildside Press, 2012, ISBN 978-1-4344-4467-7
- The Chimera and the Shadowfox Griefer and Other Curious People, Borgo Press / Wildside Press, 2012, ISBN 978-1-4344-4518-6
- The Fold-O-Rama Wars at the Blue Moon Roach Hotel and Other Colorful Tales of Transformation and Tattoos, Borgo Press / Wildside Press, 2012 ISBN 978-1-4344-4517-9
- The Hemingway Kittens and Other Feline Fancies and Fantasies, Borgo Press / Wildside Press, 2013, ISBN 978-1-4794-0120-8
- Homely in the Cradle and Other Stories, Wildside Press, 2015, ISBN 978-1-4794-0558-9
- The A.R. Morlan Megapack, Wildside Press, 2015, ISBN 978-1-4794-0485-8
- The Bone-God's Lair and Other Tales of the Famous and the Infamous, Wildside Press, 2016, ISBN 978-1-4794-2006-3
