= Richland Center, Wisconsin =

- City
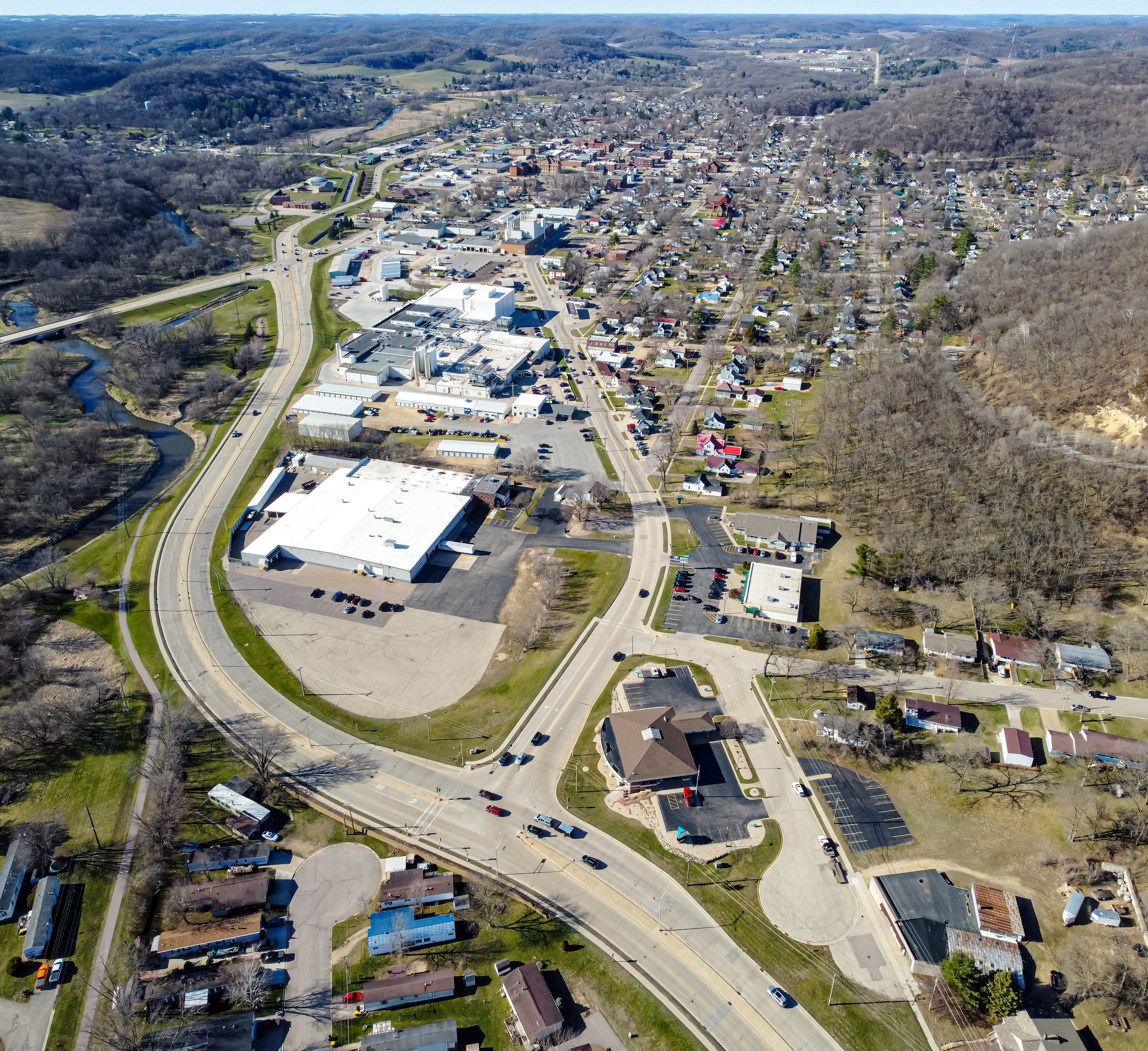
- US-14, Wis-80/56, and the Pine River pass through town

- Location of Richland Center in Richland County, Wisconsin

- Location within Wisconsin Location within the United States
- Coordinates: 43°20′16″N 90°23′5″W
- Country: United States
- State: Wisconsin
- County: Richland

Area
  - Total: 4.79 sq mi (12.41 km^{2})
  - Land: 4.69 sq mi (12.14 km^{2})
  - Water: 0.085 sq mi (0.22 km^{2})
- Elevation: 728 ft (222 m)

Population (2020)
  - Total: 5,114
  - Density: 1,091/sq mi (421.3/km^{2})
- Time zone: UTC-6 (Central (CST))
  - Summer (DST): UTC-5 (CDT)
- ZIP Code: 53581
- Area code: 608
- FIPS code: 55-67625
- GNIS feature ID: 1578616
- Website: www.richlandcenterwi.gov

Richland Center is a city in Richland County, Wisconsin, United States and is the county seat. The population was 5,114 at the 2020 census.

== History ==
Richland Center was founded in 1851 by Ira S. Haseltine from Andover, Vermont, northwest of Brattleboro. He was drawn to the site because of its abundant water power, fertile prairies, and its juxtaposition to the geographical center of Richland County. Haseltine offered to donate land to the county if Richland Center was chosen in a vote as the county seat. In 1852 the Wisconsin Legislature formally declared Richland Center as the seat of justice for Richland County. The present Richland County courthouse was built in Richland Center in 1889.

In 1876, a narrow-gauge railroad branch connected Richland Center with the Chicago, Milwaukee & St. Paul Railroad at Lone Rock, Wisconsin, providing an outlet for the town's commerce. The line was originally constructed with maple rails, but it was rebuilt as a standard gauge iron railway in 1880. On October 8, 1882, the town's railway depot was destroyed when an early morning fire ignited two kegs of gunpowder stored inside, causing an explosion which tore the roof from the building and scorched several nearby rail cars. Another passenger depot, built in 1909, still stands today, serving as a visitor center for the community.

Richland Center became an important location for the women's suffrage movement in Wisconsin after Laura Briggs James, Julia Bowen, and other residents founded the Richland Center Woman's Club in early 1882. The club quickly became the largest suffrage group in the state and was influential in organizing the movement throughout Wisconsin. Susan B. Anthony visited Richland Center in 1886. Later, Laura James' daughter Ada James became influential in the movement, helping to begin the Political Equality League in 1909 and advocating for women's rights, pacifism, birth control, and prohibition. The women's club was the driving force behind the construction of the Richland Center City Auditorium, which was the city hall from 1913 to 1998.

Frank Lloyd Wright was born in Richland Center in 1867. The A. D. German Warehouse, completed in 1921, is the only building designed by Wright in Richland Center and is an early representation of his Mayan Revival style.

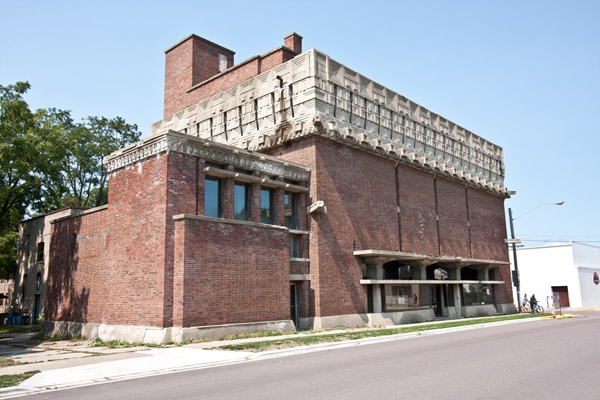
Frank Lloyd Wright's A.D. German Warehouse, view from the southeast

The origin of General Telephone and Electronics (GTE) can be traced to the Richland Center Telephone Company. In 1918, three Wisconsin public utility accountants (Sigurd L. Odegard, John A. Pratt, and John F. O'Connell) purchased the Richland Center Telephone Company for $33,500. At that time, the modest company served only 1,466 telephones in southern Wisconsin. But in 1920, the three accountants formed the Commonwealth Telephone Company and engaged in an aggressive acquisition program, which dramatically expanded its services to more than 500,000 telephones in 25 states. Following bankruptcy during the Great Depression, the company reorganized into the General Telephone Corporation and continued to expand. After merging with Sylvania Electric Products in 1959, it again changed its name, this time to General Telephone & Electronics Corporation (GT&E, later GTE). By 1969, GTE provided service to 10 million telephones across the nation, making it the largest independent telephone company in the United States.

== Geography ==
Richland Center is located at 43°20′16″N 90°23′5″W (43.337836, -90.384605).

According to the United States Census Bureau, the city has a total area of 4.36 square miles (11.29 km^{2}), of which 4.28 square miles (11.09 km^{2}) is land and 0.08 square miles (0.21 km^{2}) is water. The Pine River runs through the western part of the city.

=== Climate ===
Climate data for Richland Center, Wisconsin (1991–2020 normals, extremes 1908, 1920–2015)
Month	Jan	Feb	Mar	Apr	May	Jun	Jul	Aug	Sep	Oct	Nov	Dec	Year
Record high °F (°C)	58 (14)	67 (19)	84 (29)	93 (34)	103 (39)	103 (39)	110 (43)	102 (39)	104 (40)	91 (33)	78 (26)	64 (18)	110 (43)
Mean daily maximum °F (°C)	27.3 (−2.6)	31.8 (−0.1)	44.0 (6.7)	57.2 (14.0)	69.1 (20.6)	78.4 (25.8)	82.0 (27.8)	80.1 (26.7)	73.2 (22.9)	60.2 (15.7)	45.2 (7.3)	32.4 (0.2)	56.7 (13.7)
Daily mean °F (°C)	17.5 (−8.1)	21.4 (−5.9)	33.2 (0.7)	45.3 (7.4)	57.0 (13.9)	67.0 (19.4)	70.8 (21.6)	68.8 (20.4)	61.0 (16.1)	48.4 (9.1)	35.4 (1.9)	23.6 (−4.7)	45.8 (7.7)
Mean daily minimum °F (°C)	7.6 (−13.6)	10.9 (−11.7)	22.3 (−5.4)	33.4 (0.8)	44.9 (7.2)	55.5 (13.1)	59.5 (15.3)	57.4 (14.1)	48.8 (9.3)	36.6 (2.6)	25.6 (−3.6)	14.8 (−9.6)	34.8 (1.6)
Record low °F (°C)	−46 (−43)	−40 (−40)	−30 (−34)	0 (−18)	21 (−6)	31 (−1)	38 (3)	33 (1)	22 (−6)	3 (−16)	−17 (−27)	−31 (−35)	−46 (−43)
Average precipitation inches (mm)	1.26 (32)	1.11 (28)	2.04 (52)	4.10 (104)	4.68 (119)	6.03 (153)	5.02 (128)	4.92 (125)	3.92 (100)	2.96 (75)	1.99 (51)	1.50 (38)	39.53 (1,004)
Average snowfall inches (cm)	11.3 (29)	9.8 (25)	5.0 (13)	1.1 (2.8)	0.0 (0.0)	0.0 (0.0)	0.0 (0.0)	0.0 (0.0)	0.0 (0.0)	0.1 (0.25)	2.4 (6.1)	10.7 (27)	40.4 (103)
Average precipitation days (≥ 0.01 in)	9.5	7.7	8.4	11.6	12.7	11.9	11.0	10.3	9.9	9.6	7.9	9.6	120.1
Average snowy days (≥ 0.1 in)	6.9	6.2	3.1	0.8	0.0	0.0	0.0	0.0	0.0	0.1	1.6	6.1	24.8
Source: NOAA

== Demographics ==
Historical population
Census	Pop.	Note	%±
1880	1,227		—
1890	1,819		48.2%
1900	2,321		27.6%
1910	2,652		14.3%
1920	3,409		28.5%
1930	3,632		6.5%
1940	4,364		20.2%
1950	4,608		5.6%
1960	4,746		3.0%
1970	5,086		7.2%
1980	4,997		−1.7%
1990	5,018		0.4%
2000	5,114		1.9%
2010	5,184		1.4%
2020	5,114		−1.4%
U.S. Decennial Census

=== 2020 census ===
As of the census of 2020, the population was 5,114. The population density was 1,091.1 inhabitants per square mile (421.3/km^{2}). There were 2,541 housing units at an average density of 542.1 per square mile (209.3/km^{2}). The racial makeup of the city was 89.6% White, 1.3% Black or African American, 1.0% Asian, 0.3% Native American, 2.5% from other races, and 5.3% from two or more races. Ethnically, the population was 5.7% Hispanic or Latino of any race.

According to the American Community Survey estimates for 2016-2020, the median income for a household in the city was $41,724, and the median income for a family was $57,813. Male full-time workers had a median income of $42,995 versus $35,221 for female workers. The per capita income for the city was $24,829. About 12.0% of families and 16.5% of the population were below the poverty line, including 20.2% of those under age 18 and 13.7% of those age 65 or over. Of the population age 25 and over, 90.2% were high school graduates or higher and 21.1% had a bachelor's degree or higher.

=== 2010 census ===
As of the census of 2010, there were 5,184 people, 2,361 households, and 1,235 families residing in the city. The population density was 1,211.2 inhabitants per square mile (467.6/km^{2}). There were 2,613 housing units at an average density of 610.5 per square mile (235.7/km^{2}). The racial makeup of the city was 96.1% White, 0.7% African American, 0.2% Native American, 0.8% Asian, 1.2% from other races, and 0.9% from two or more races. Hispanic or Latino people of any race were 3.3% of the population.

There were 2,361 households, of which 25.5% had children under the age of 18 living with them, 37.4% were married couples living together, 10.8% had a female householder with no husband present, 4.1% had a male householder with no wife present, and 47.7% were non-families. 40.9% of all households were made up of individuals, and 21.1% had someone living alone who was 65 years of age or older. The average household size was 2.12 and the average family size was 2.87.

The median age in the city was 40 years. 22.1% of residents were under the age of 18; 10.1% were between the ages of 18 and 24; 23.2% were from 25 to 44; 24.3% were from 45 to 64; and 20.4% were 65 years of age or older. The gender makeup of the city was 46.4% male and 53.6% female.

=== 2000 census ===
As of the census of 2000, there were 5,114 people, 2,296 households, and 1,285 families residing in the city. The population density was 1,164.6 people per square mile (449.8/km^{2}). There were 2,470 housing units at an average density of 562.5 per square mile (217.2/km^{2}). The racial makeup of the city was 98.22% White, 0.16% African American, 0.25% Native American, 0.33% Asian, 0.35% from other races, and 0.68% from two or more races. Hispanic or Latino people of any race were 0.92% of the population.

There were 2,296 households, out of which 25.6% had children under the age of 18 living with them, 41.6% were married couples living together, 11.3% had a female householder with no husband present, and 44.0% were non-families. 38.2% of all households were made up of individuals, and 21.1% had someone living alone who was 65 years of age or older. The average household size was 2.15 and the average family size was 2.83.

In the city, the population was spread out, with 21.6% under the age of 18, 10.9% from 18 to 24, 24.2% from 25 to 44, 20.3% from 45 to 64, and 23.0% who were 65 years of age or older. The median age was 40 years. For every 100 females, there were 84.4 males. For every 100 females age 18 and over, there were 78.8 males.

== Transportation ==
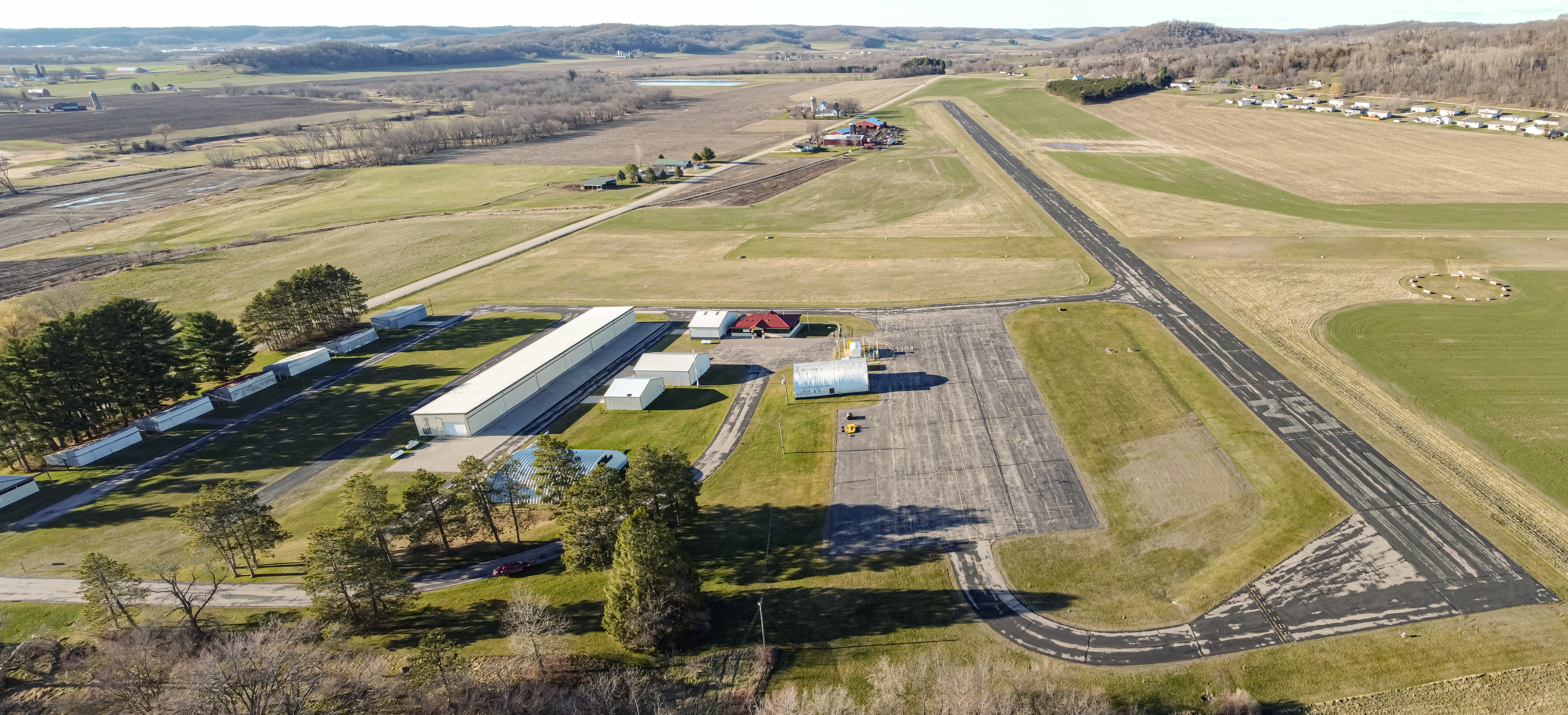
Richland Center Airport

Richland Airport (93C) serves the city and surrounding communities.

== Education ==
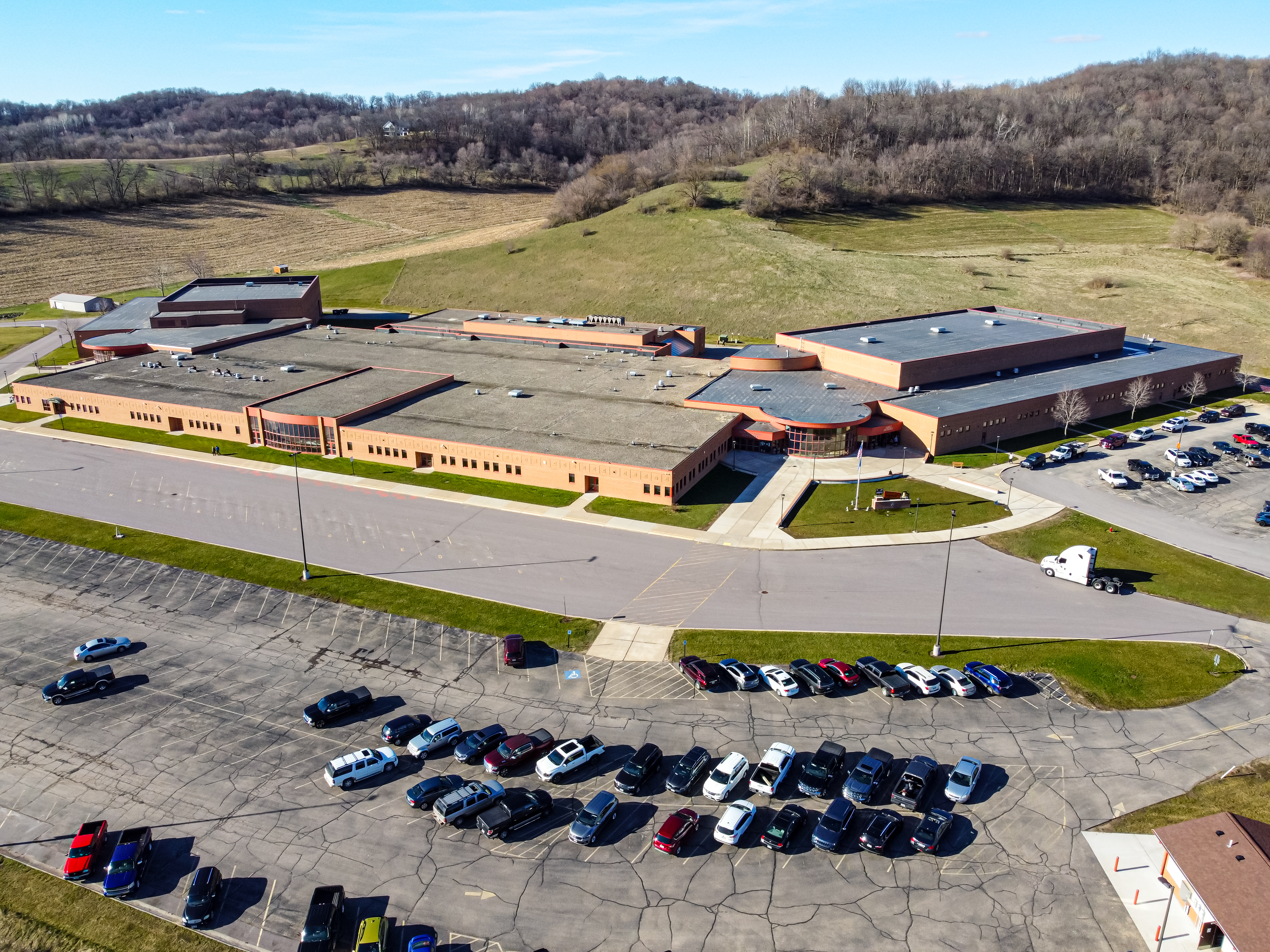
Richland Center High School

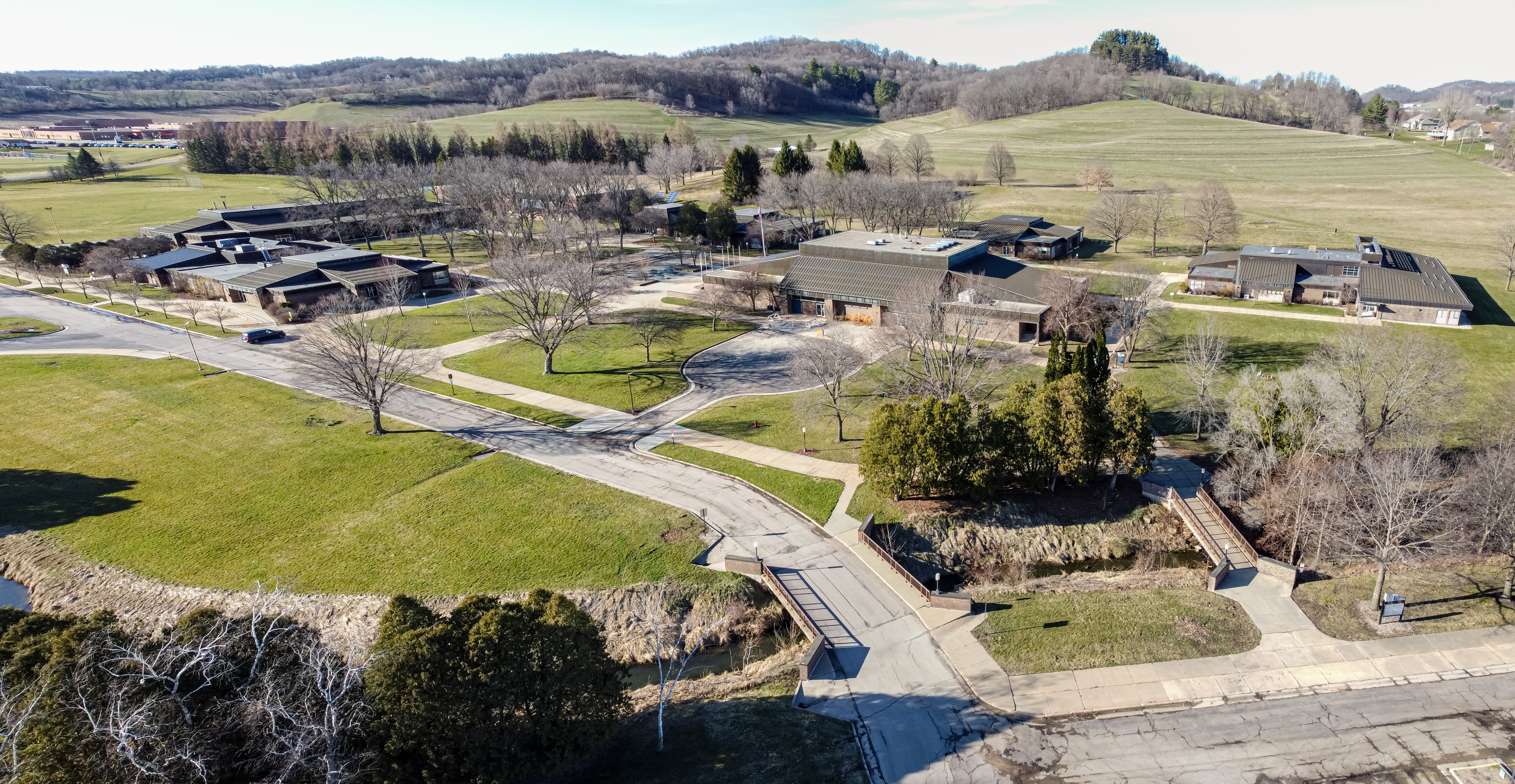
University of Wisconsin–Platteville Richland

The city was home to the University of Wisconsin–Platteville Richland campus, which was a freshman-sophomore campus in the University of Wisconsin System. The college's last semester ended in May of 2023.

The city is served by the Richland School District.

== Notable people ==
- Svetlana Alliluyeva, only daughter of Joseph Stalin
- James N. Azim Jr., Wisconsin State Representative
- Levi H. Bancroft, Attorney General of Wisconsin, Speaker of the Wisconsin State Assembly
- Lynda Barry, cartoonist
- Ann Walsh Bradley, Wisconsin Supreme Court justice
- Raymond Leo Burke, Roman Catholic Archbishop and Cardinal
- J. E. Coffland, Wisconsin State Representative
- Frank J. Cosgrove, Wisconsin State Representative
- Robert H. DeLap, Wisconsin State Representative
- Bradie Ewing, NFL player
- William M. Fogo, Wisconsin State Representative
- Joe Garden, author, writer for The Onion
- Ada James, suffragist
- Birney Maries Jarvis, Wisconsin State Representative
- Clyde Jewett, Wisconsin State Representative
- Joshua L. Johns, U.S. Representative
- William H. Joslin, Wisconsin State Representative
- Jay G. Lamberson, Wisconsin State Representative
- Gilbert L. Laws, U.S. Representative
- Harley A. Martin, Wisconsin State Representative
- Jess Miller, Wisconsin State Senator
- Oliver Munson, Wisconsin State Senator
- Deborah Polaski, international opera singer
- Daniel B. Priest, Wisconsin State Representative, lawyer
- Dell H. Richards, Wisconsin State Representative
- Dale Schultz, Wisconsin State Senator
- Vernon Wallace Thomson, Governor of Wisconsin
- Frank Lloyd Wright, architect

== Sister cities ==
Richland Center has two sister cities:

- Santa Teresa, Carazo Department, Nicaragua
- Yueqing, Zhejiang, China

== Gallery ==
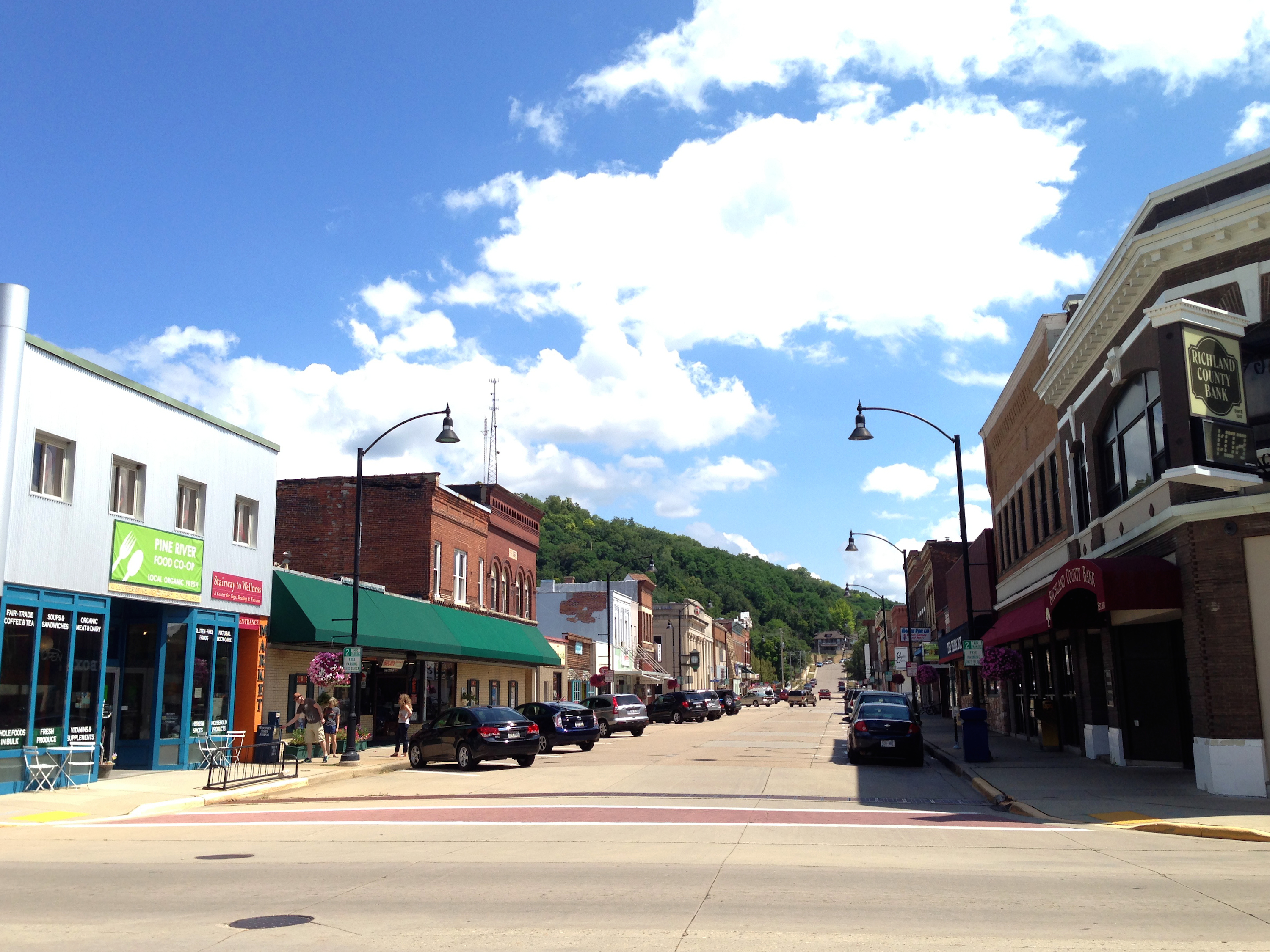
Richland Center's historic downtown, viewed from Court and Main Street
