= Richland Airport (Wisconsin) =

Richland Airport Richland Center Municipal Airport
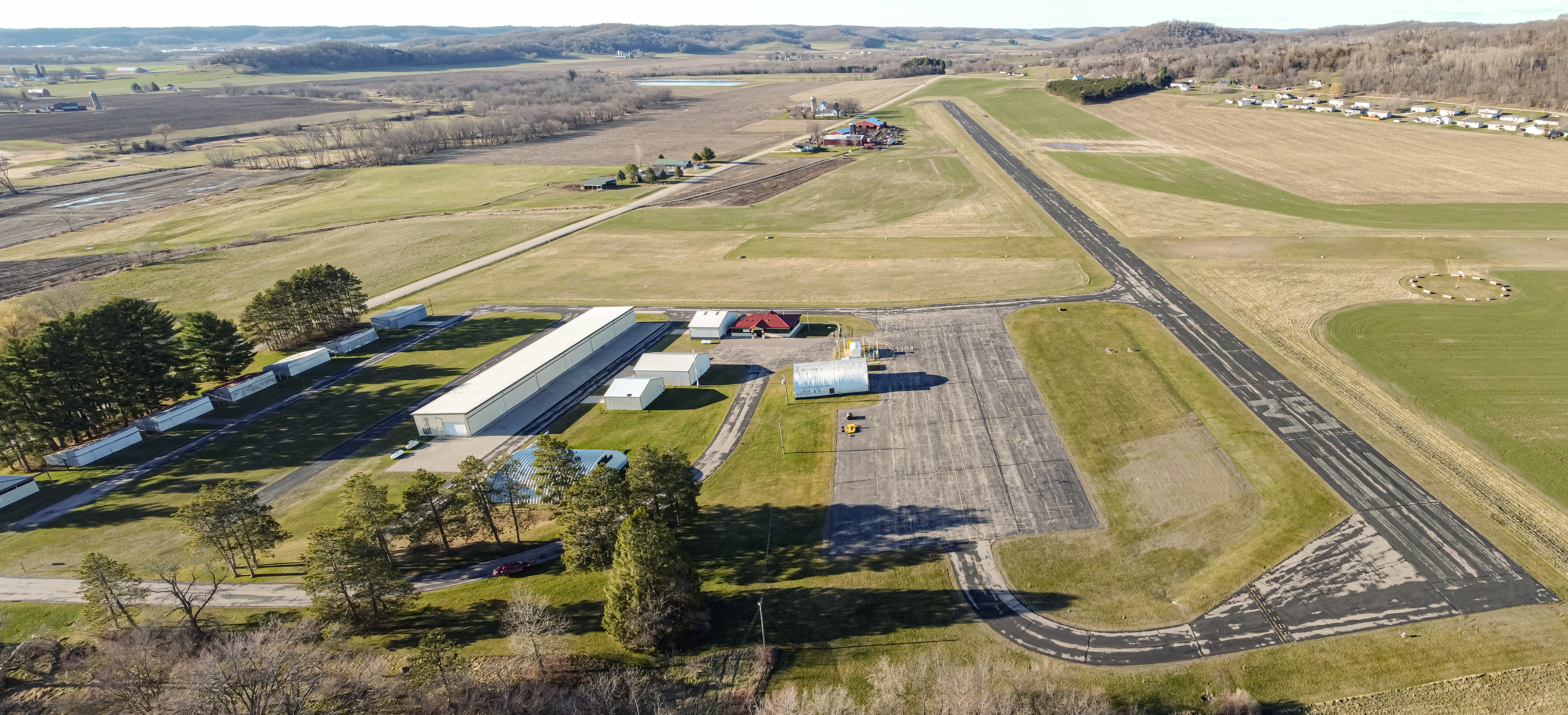
- IATA: none; ICAO: none; FAA LID: 93C

Summary
- Airport type: Public
- Owner: City of Richland Center
- Serves: Richland Center, Wisconsin
- Opened: January 1947
- Time zone: CST (UTC−06:00)
  - Summer (DST): CDT (UTC−05:00)
- Elevation AMSL: 742 ft / 226 m
- Coordinates: 43°17′00″N 090°17′54″W

Map
- Location of airport in Wisconsin 93C (the United States)

Runways
Direction	Length		Surface
Direction	ft	m	Surface
17/35	3,200	975	Asphalt
9/27	1,500	457	Turf

Statistics
- Aircraft operations (2022): 9,200
- Based aircraft (2024): 11
- Source: Federal Aviation Administration

Richland Airport (FAA LID: 93C) is a city owned public use airport located four nautical miles (5 mi, 7 km) southeast of the central business district of Richland Center, a city in Richland County, Wisconsin, United States. Also known as Richland Center Municipal Airport, It is included in the Federal Aviation Administration (FAA) National Plan of Integrated Airport Systems for 2025 - 2029 in which it is categorized as a basic general aviation facility.

== Facilities and aircraft ==
Richland Airport covers an area of 105 acres (42 ha) at an elevation of 742 feet (226 m) above mean sea level. It has two runways: 17/35 is 3,200 by 60 feet (975 x 18 m) with an asphalt surface and 9/27 is 1,500 by 100 feet (457 x 30 m) with a turf surface.

For the 12-month period ending September 26, 2022, the airport had 9,200 aircraft operations, an average of 25 per day: 98% general aviation, 1% air taxi and 1% military.

In July 2024, there were 11 aircraft based at this airport: all 11 single-engine.

== See also ==
- List of airports in Wisconsin
