= Flambeau Mine =

Mine in Wisconsin, United States

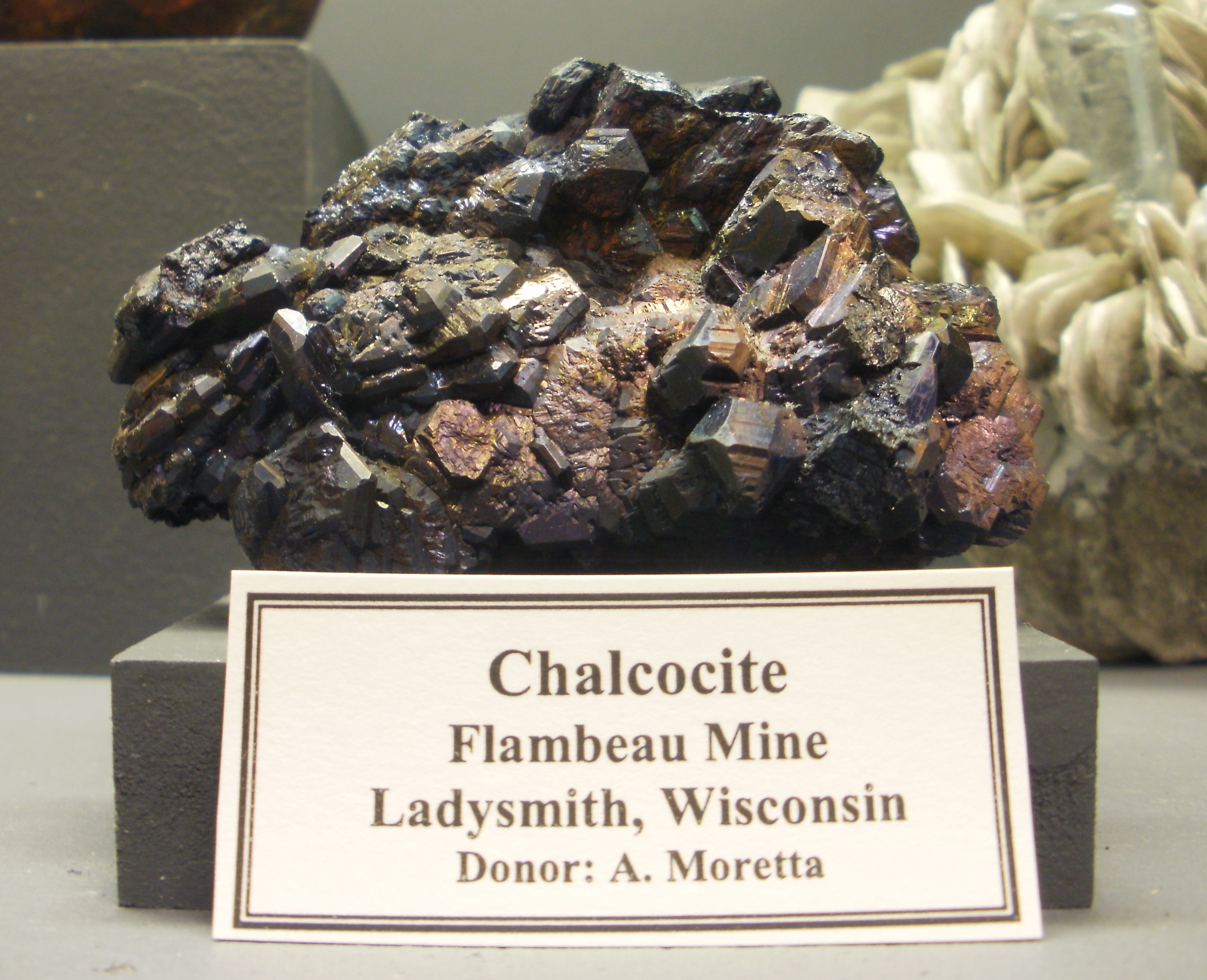

- Location in Wisconsin
- Location: Ladysmith,WI,United States; 45°26′33″N 91°06′55″W
- Production: 181,000 tons of copper 334,000 ounces of gold 3.3 million ounces of silver 4.5 million tons of high sulfur waste rock 4 million tons of low sulfur waste
- Financial year: 1993-1997
- Greatest depth: 220 feet
- Opened: 1993
- Active: 1993-1997
- Closed: 1997
- Website: http://flambeaumine.com/
- Acquired: 1969

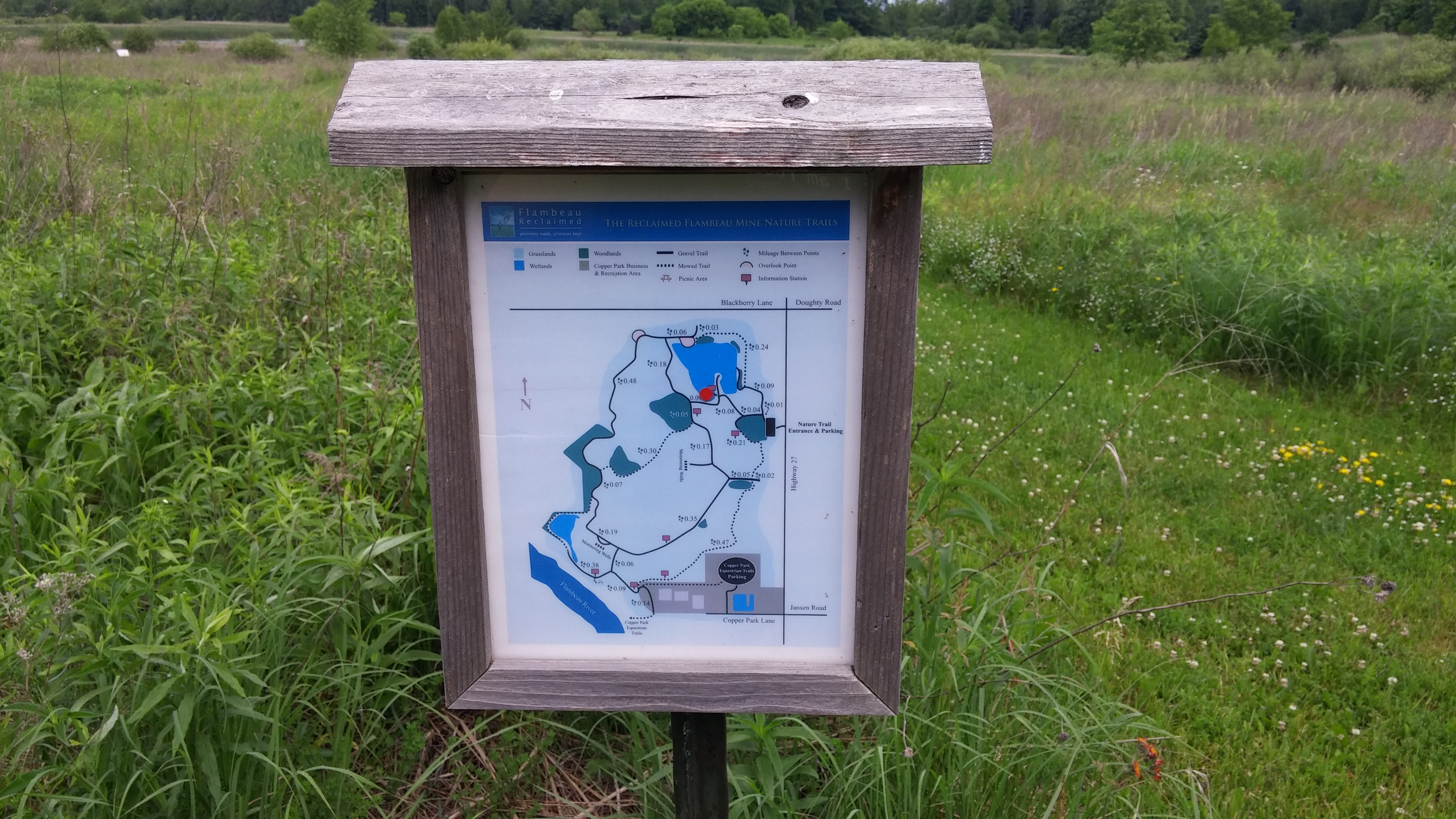
Flambeau Mine map

The Flambeau Mine was an open pit mine of a copper-gold deposit near the Flambeau River, south of Ladysmith, Wisconsin, United States. It was mined by a subsidiary of Kennecott Minerals between 1993 and 1997, and returned to a fairly natural state after. As of 2022, it was "the only example of a metallic mine that was permitted, constructed, operated, and reclaimed under [Wisconsin's] existing regulatory framework."

== History ==
The Flambeau Mine's deposit was discovered in 1968 by airborne survey. Exploratory drilling followed, which determined that the deposit bore copper and gold, and was roughly 50 feet (15 m) wide, 2,400 feet (730 m) long, and 800 feet (240 m) deep. The upper part of the deposit generally held higher concentrations of copper and gold. The deposit was located just a mile from the city of Ladysmith, with its near end only 140 feet (43 m) from the Flambeau River. This river, known for its fishing, flows into the Chippewa and subsequently the Mississippi River.

Aware of this and other deposits in northern Wisconsin, and aware of environmental disasters caused by metal sulfide mines in other places, the state passed a comprehensive mining law in 1974 which required review for mining projects and aimed to hold mining companies accountable.

In the mid-1970s, Kennecott proposed mining the whole deposit with an initial open pit followed by an underground mine, with ore processed on site and tailings disposed of nearby. After mining, the pit would have filled with water. Rusk County did not give zoning approval. With that, the state permitting process ended, and Kennecott put the project on hold.

Ten years later, in 1987, Flambeau Mining Company, a Kenncott subsidiary, came back with a less risky proposal: An open-pit mine that would remove only the rich upper 225 feet (69 m) of the deposit. Instead of processing near the river, the ore would be shipped to Canada for processing. After mining, the pit would be back-filled with the original waste materials, adding limestone to neutralize acids, and the surface would be returned to a fairly natural state.

This second proposal also met local opposition. Roscoe Churchill led a local citizens' group which was allied with environmentalists across the state and the Ojibwe. The locals feared for their river and groundwater. (Kennecott runs an open pit copper mine in Utah that has contaminated groundwater nearby.) Allies from around the state feared that if the Flambeau mine went forward, other mines would follow. Local supporters argued that the mine would provide 50 jobs and tax revenue to Ladysmith. Opponents argued that those short-term benefits weren't worth the long-term risk.

In 1991, the project was approved and work began preparing the site. Ore shipment began in 1993 and continued through 1997. Unwanted materials from the pit were stockpiled onsite, with high-sulfur materials in a 27-acre holding area lined with a plastic membrane and liquid collection system. Under Wisconsin's mining laws, the mine conducted more than 1,000 analyses on water samples and treated more than 600 million gallons of water in a state-of-the-art water treatment plant. During construction and operations, 85% of the workforce were local residents. More than 100,000 people visited the mine, taking in the view from the visitors center high above the 181-acre site. During the four year operation, 1.9 million tons of ore were shipped to Canada, yielding 181,000 tons of copper, 334,000 ounces of gold and 3.3 million ounces of silver.

Reclamation was done from 1997 to 1998. The pit was backfilled with materials removed from it, with high sulfur components buried at the bottom of the pit, mixed with crushed limestone to neutralize acids, and compacted. Less toxic materials were layered on top. The site was contoured to roughly match the original terrain, with ditches to drain off surface water. Topsoil was applied, then grasses, wildflowers and trees were planted to provide a fairly natural mix. A wetland area was also reconstructed.

Today, the site is home to hundreds of species of plants and animals. Four miles of hiking trails have been created on the site and five miles of equestrian trails have been created south of the site. The nine miles of trails are open to the public for non-motorized recreation year round.

== Pollution ==
Water around the mine site is monitored. For several years after 1999, samples from wells in the former pit showed elevated levels of sulfate, copper, manganese, and iron as expected. Since then, levels in the pit have stabilized. Monitoring wells outside the pit showed some sharp increases in metals and sulfate after 1997, but have been stable or decreasing since 2013. Kennecott continues to monitor these levels to the DNR, and if levels exceed the permit conditions, Kennecott would have to mitigate effects.

=== Contamination ===
The water that flows from the mine site into the Flambeau River contains copper, manganese, sulfate, and iron at levels that do not threaten the environment. There is no acid in the ground water that moves from the pit into the Flambeau River. The levels of copper, sulfate, manganese and iron in ground water samples are below the levels considered acceptable provided by the DNR.

=== Surface water ===
Surface water runoff from the mine site did not meet Wisconsin surface water quality standards. Runoff is polluting a stream which flows into the Flambeau River. Multiple water samples between 2004 and 2008 showed significantly elevated levels of copper, exceeding standards. Studies show that the stream is almost devoid of life, including vegetation and fish. Researchers believe this is because of the high metal levels. At one location, the copper level was approximately 10 times the acute water quality standard, and the zinc level is approximately twice the acute water quality standard. Copper and Zinc combined impact on aquatic organisms is greater than that of either by itself.

=== Ground water ===
In a monitoring well between the pit and the Flambeau River, the groundwater did not meet Wisconsin's groundwater quality standards. These contaminants are moving out of the pit. Despite hopes that water infiltration and limestone would neutralize reactions within the pit, monitoring results show that pit reactions had not stabilized. Mine design plans called for the development of a cutoff wall between the pit and the Flambeau River to limit movement of water exiting the pit. It is possible the contaminated water is moving around, under or through the cutoff wall. Another possibility is the bedrock itself is permeable and contaminated water is moving through fractures.

== Status of the mine today ==
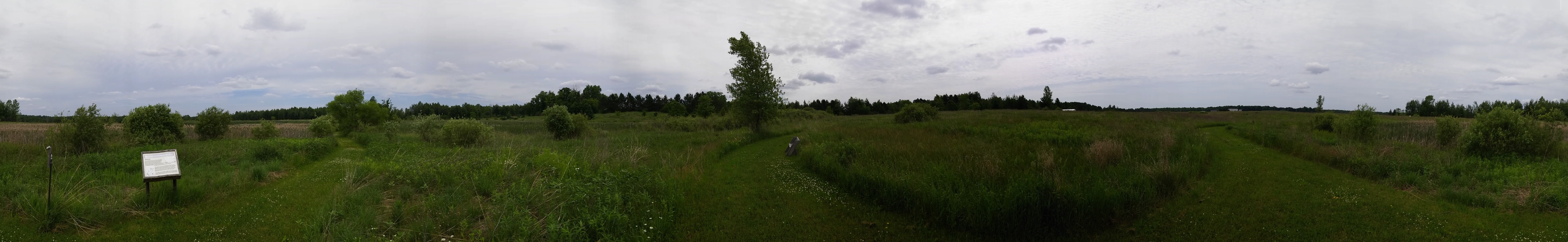

A Certificate of Completion for reclamation activities was granted in May 2007; it never into account the groundwater contamination within the back-filled pit and potential impacts of the mine on fish and other aquatic life in the Flambeau River. The decision for partial certification was based on completion of the surface reclamation activities. Certification was withheld for the 32-acre area where surface water pollution was emanating.

== Lawsuit ==
Lawsuit concerning the Flambeau Mine:

=== January, 2011 ===
The Wisconsin Resources Protection Council filed a civil lawsuit against the Flambeau Mining Company in U.S. District Court alleging ongoing violations of the Federal Clean Water Act. The charge was that the discharge of copper, zinc, iron and other pollutants to Stream C was done without a permit and in violation of the Act.

=== July 2012 ===
A federal judge ruled that the mine was the source of the pollution and that the mining company had indeed violated the Clean Water Act. At the same time, the judge praised the company for its environmental practices – recognizing the effort to clean up the pollution, but acknowledging it had not been fully successful.

=== Early in 2012 ===
After the lawsuit was filed, the Flambeau Mining Company removed the liner from the water containment area that was a source of the pollution to prevent further discharges to surface waters. This now directs contaminated water to seep into groundwater.

== Events ==
In August, the Flambeau Mining Company and a local business, the Ladysmith Veterinary Clinic, co-hosted a Prairie Workshop for local residents featuring presentations and prairie tours. Dr. Julian and Terresa Lang, owners of the Ladysmith Veterinary Clinic, have developed their very own one and a half-acre prairie, the Lang Prairie Plot, in Grant Town, south of Ladysmith. Jody Lang, a wildlife biologist, assisted the Langs by designing, planting, and providing consultation of the Lang prairie. These native prairie plantings to be found on the Reclaimed Flambeau Mine site.
