= Richland School District (Wisconsin) =

School district

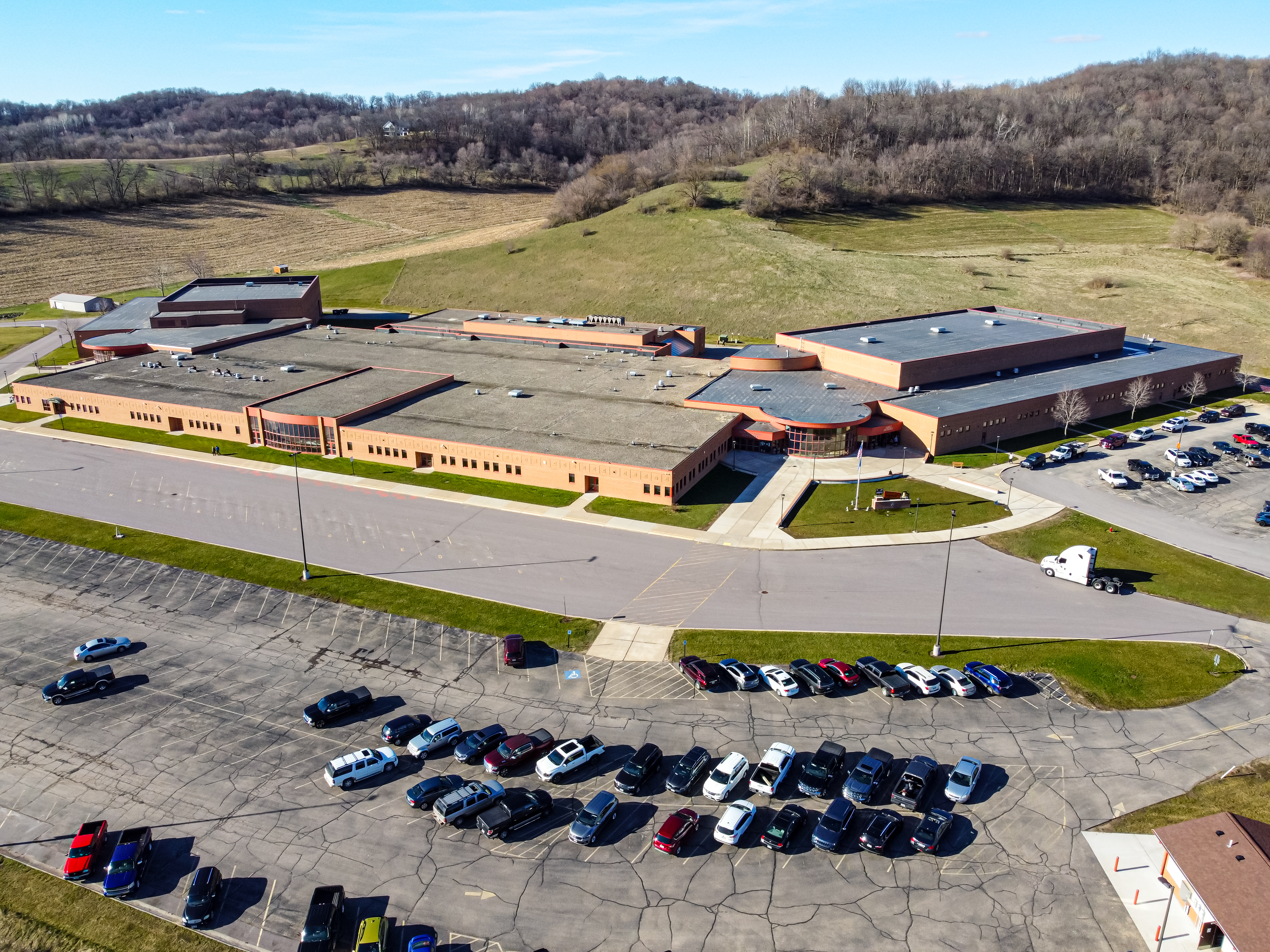
Richland Center High School

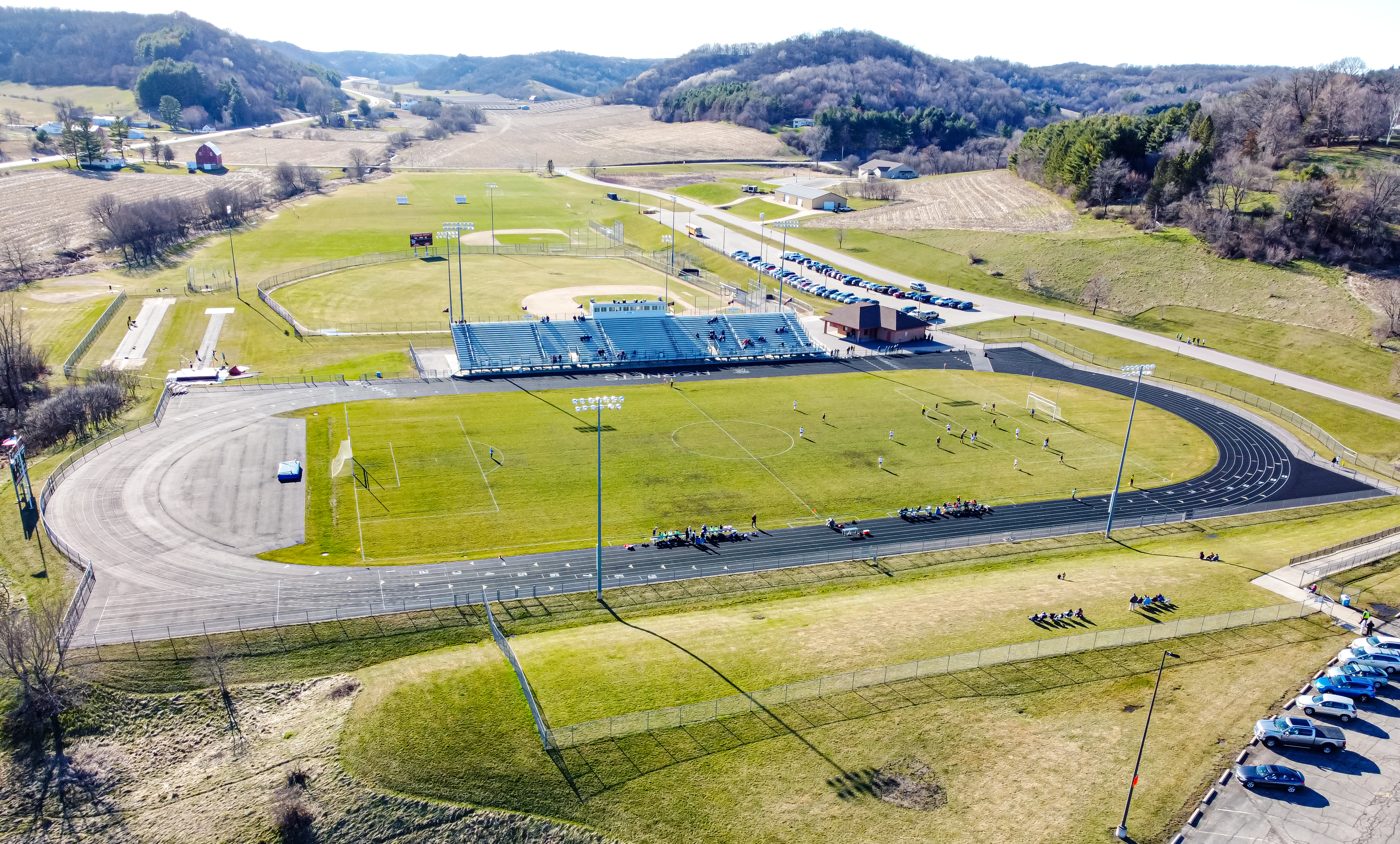
Richland Center football field and track

Richland School District is a school district located in Richland Center, Wisconsin.

== Schools ==
- Jefferson Elementary (1st To 5th grade)
- Doudna Elementary (Kindergarten to 5th grade)
- Lincoln School (4K & Kindergarten)
- Richland Center Middle School
- Richland Center High School
- Comprehensive Learning Center at Lincoln (alternative secondary school)
