= Rusk County Airport (Wisconsin) =

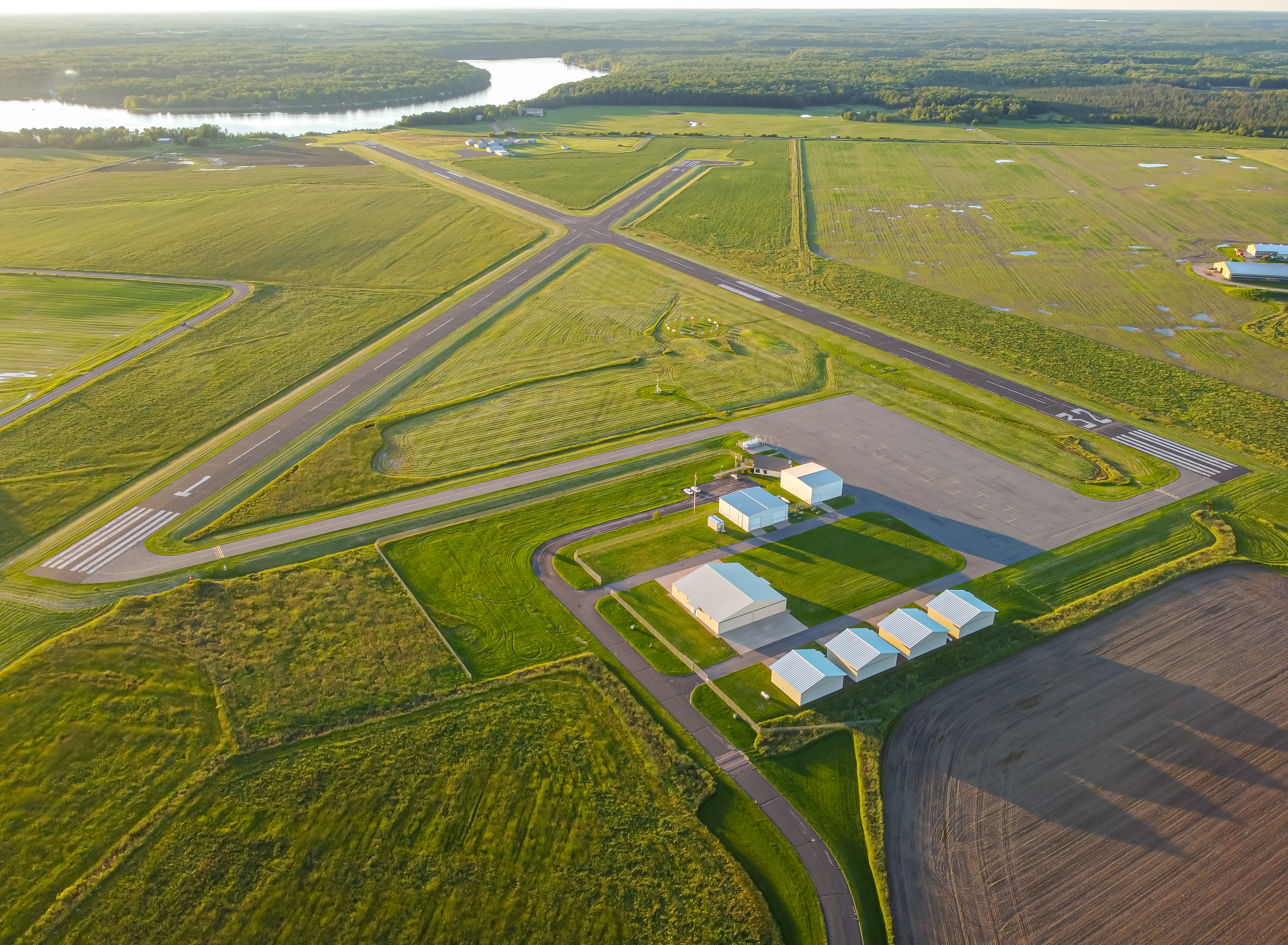
- IATA: none; ICAO: KRCX; FAA LID: RCX

Summary
- Airport type: Public
- Owner: Rusk County
- Serves: Ladysmith, Wisconsin
- Location: Tony, Wisconsin
- Time zone: CST (UTC−06:00)
  - Summer (DST): CDT (UTC−05:00)
- Elevation AMSL: 1,240 ft / 378 m
- Coordinates: 45°29′48″N 091°00′01″W
- Website: RuskCounty.org/...

Map
- Location of airport in Wisconsin RCX (the United States)

Runways
Direction	Length		Surface
Direction	ft	m	Surface
14/32	4,001	1,220	Asphalt
01/19	3,199	975	Asphalt

Statistics
- Aircraft operations (2023): 8,070
- Based aircraft (2024): 18
- Source: Federal Aviation Administration

Rusk County Airport (ICAO: KRCX, FAA LID: RCX) is a county-owned public-use airport in Rusk County, Wisconsin, United States. It is located four nautical miles (7 km) northeast of the central business district of Ladysmith, Wisconsin. It is included in the Federal Aviation Administration (FAA) National Plan of Integrated Airport Systems for 2025–2029, in which it is categorized as a local general aviation facility.

Although many U.S. airports use the same three-letter location identifier for the FAA and IATA, this facility is assigned RCX by the FAA but has no designation from the IATA.

== Facilities and aircraft ==
Rusk County Airport covers an area of 240 acres (97 ha) at an elevation of 1,240 feet (378 m) above mean sea level. It has two asphalt paved runways: 14/32 is 4,001 by 75 feet (1,220 x 23 m) and 1/19 is 3,199 by 75 feet (975 x 23 m). The Rusk County NDB navaid, (RCX) frequency 356 kHz, is located on the field.

For the 12-month period ending July 3, 2023, the airport had 8,070 aircraft operations, an average of 22 per day: 90% general aviation, 10% air taxi and less than 1% military.

In July 2024, there were 18 aircraft based at this airport: 17 single-engine and 1 multi-engine.

== See also ==
- List of airports in Wisconsin
