= Pershing, Wisconsin =

- Town
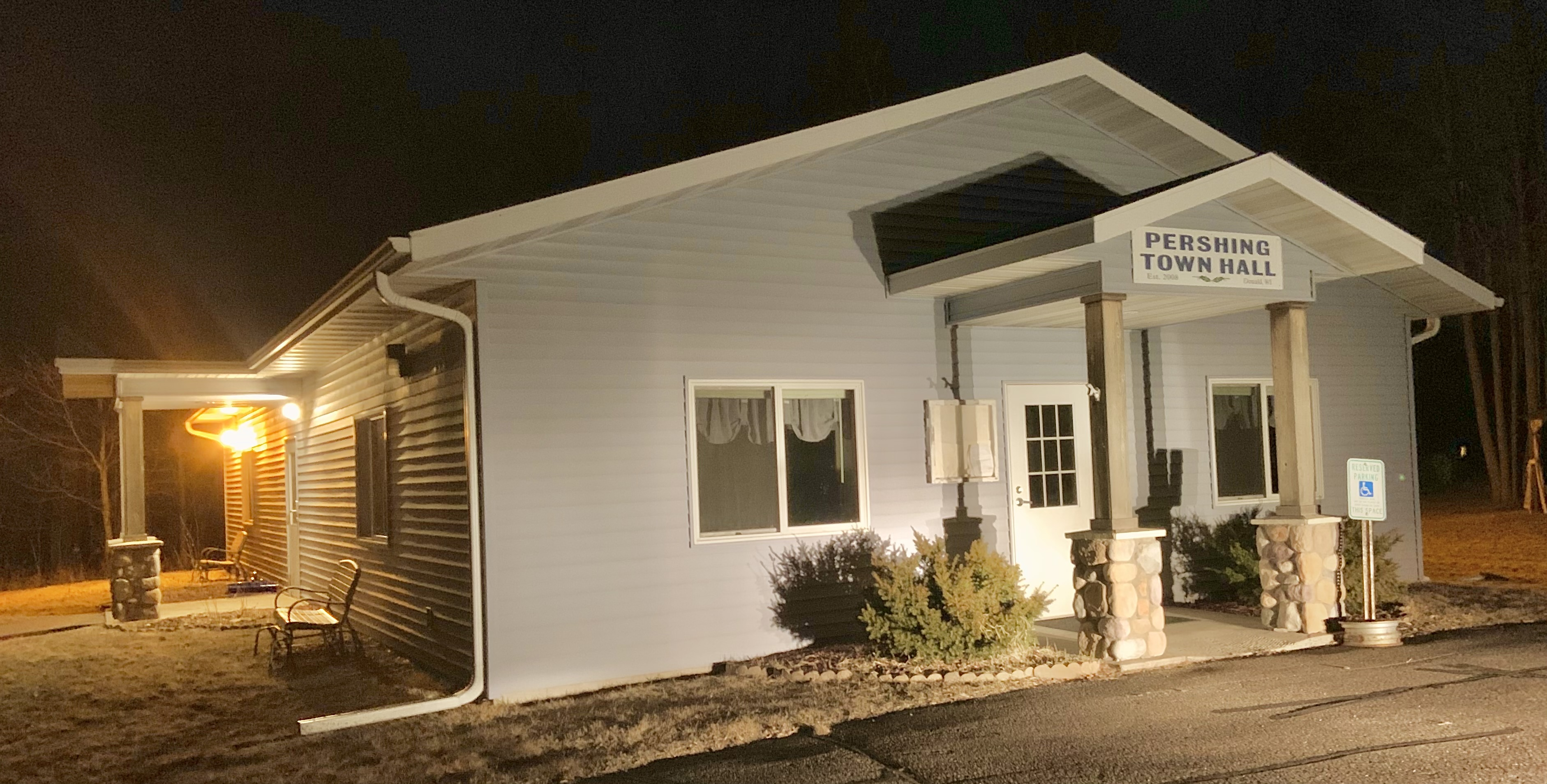
- Town hall

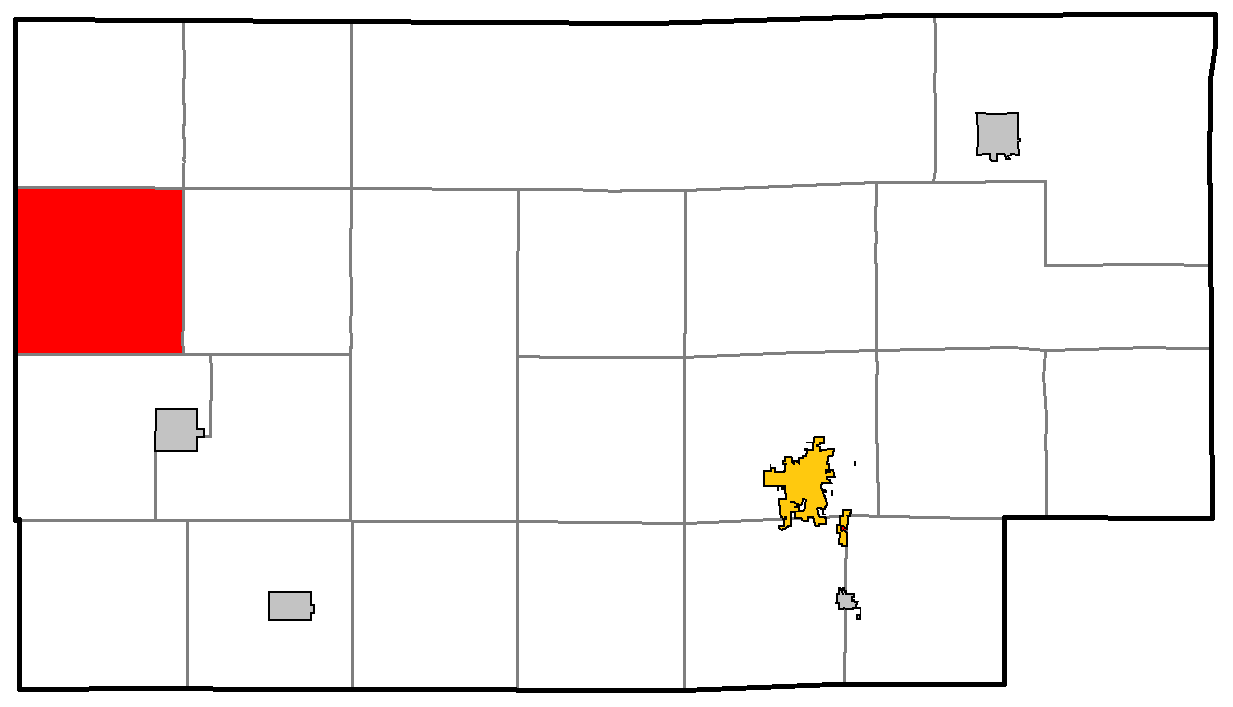
- Location of Pershing, within Taylor County

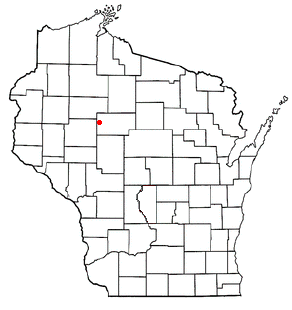
- Location of Pershing, Wisconsin
- Coordinates: 45°14′59″N 90°52′55″W
- Country: United States
- State: Wisconsin
- County: Taylor

Area
  - Total: 35.8 sq mi (92.8 km^{2})
  - Land: 35.7 sq mi (92.4 km^{2})
  - Water: 0.15 sq mi (0.4 km^{2})
- Elevation: 1,188 ft (362 m)

Population (2020)
  - Total: 201
  - Density: 5.63/sq mi (2.18/km^{2})
- Time zone: UTC-6 (Central (CST))
  - Summer (DST): UTC-5 (CDT)
- Area codes: 715 & 534
- FIPS code: 55-62100
- GNIS feature ID: 1583911
- PLSS township: T32N R4W
- Website: https://townofpershingwi.com/

Pershing is a town in Taylor County, Wisconsin, United States. The population was 201 at the 2020 census. The unincorporated community of Donald is within its boundaries.

== Geography ==
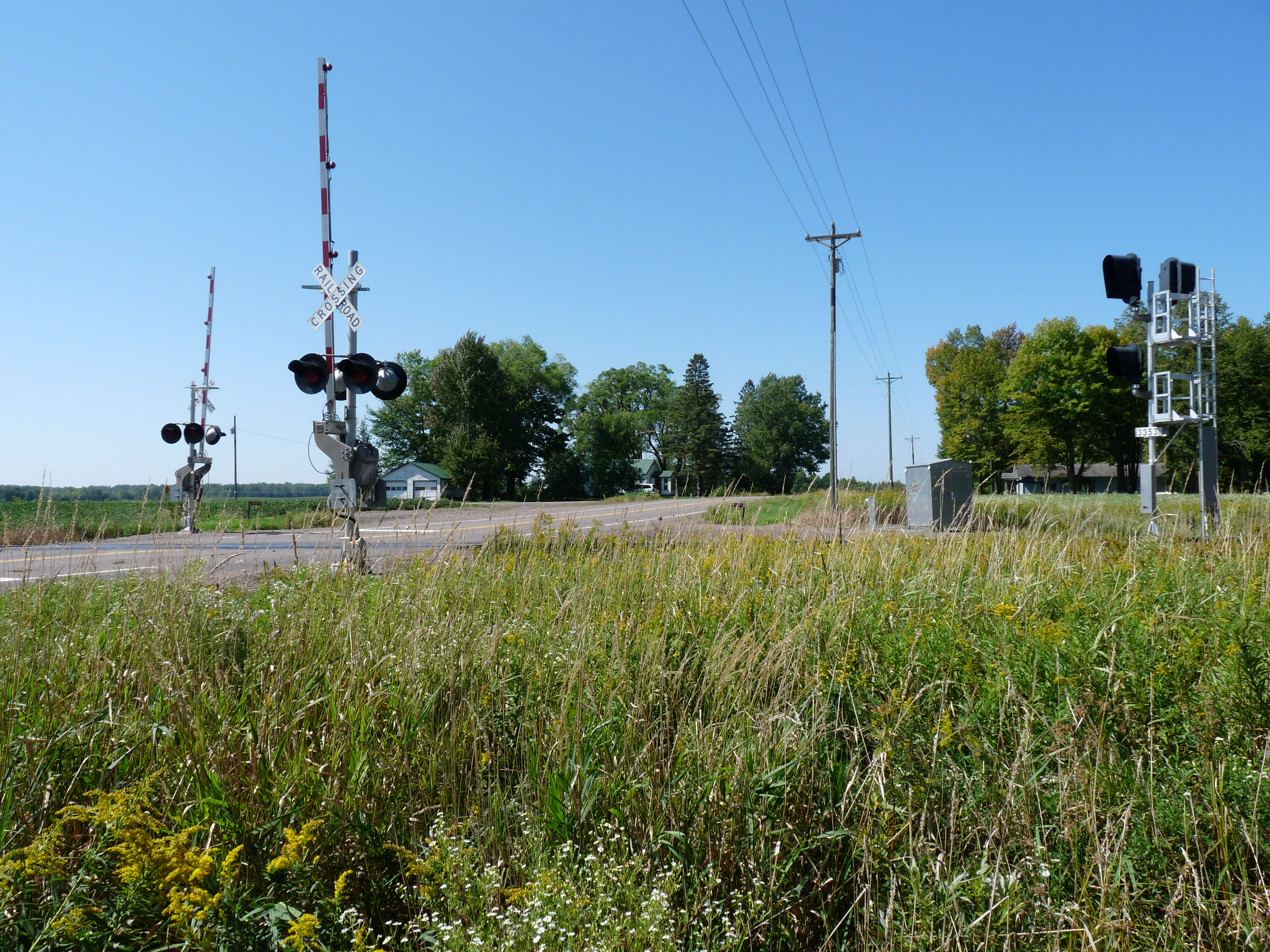
Donald, where the Soo Line met the Omaha Railroad and CTH M. Most of Pershing is flat like this area.

According to the United States Census Bureau, the town has a total area of 35.8 square miles (92.8 km^{2}), of which 35.7 square miles (92.4 km^{2}) is land and 0.2 square miles (0.4 km^{2}) (0.45%) is water.

The water consists mostly of man-made flowages in the Pershing Wildlife Area, and the Fisher River, which crosses Pershing from east to west.

== History ==
The six mile square that would become Pershing was first surveyed in 1847 by a crew working for the U.S. government. Then in 1854 another crew marked all the section corners in the township, walking through the woods and slogging through the swamps on foot, measuring with chain and compass. When done, the deputy surveyor filed this general description:

This Township contains several swamps and one in the SE corner of considerable extent. They are all unfit for cultivation. The meadow and Alder bottoms are all subject to be overflowed to a depth of 1 to 2 feet and are good for Hay. The surface is generally low and level a part is upland where the soil is 2d rate. This township is heavily timbered and is chiefly {{sic}} composed of Hemlock and Y. Birch on low level land and on uplands Sugar, Linden W. Pine and Balsam. The undergrowth is Generally thick and is composed of Hemlock Balsam and Hazel. Balsam and Elm line the margins of the Meadow and Alder bottoms. There is no improvements on this Township.

Pershing was logged starting in the late 1800s. Around 1903 the Eau Claire, Chippewa Falls, and Northeastern Railway (a.k.a. the Omaha) built its line across the township, running just south of modern County M. Around 1905 the Wisconsin Central Railway built the line which would become the Soo Line and on which trains run to this day. At the junction of the two lines the community of Donald rose.

The 1911 plat map of the six mile square that would become Pershing shows the two railroads in place. Some sort of road parallels the Omaha, following the course of modern County M. Another road follows the course of modern Gilman Drive, heading south from M toward Gilman. Outside of Donald, all the land in the township appears to be owned by logging companies. There is not a single settler's home, though the same set of maps in 1911 has a fair number of settlers in what would become Aurora and a smattering around both Hannibal and Jump River. Among the lumber companies, the largest landholders are the Northwestern Lumber Co., J.S. Owen, Fountain-Campbell Lumber Co., Mississippi River Lumber Co., A. Brown, and H. Lindemann.

By the 1913 plat map, a new road had appeared, following the course of modern County H to the north of M. Most of the land is still owned by lumber companies, but a few settlers' homes exist, mostly along the road that would become M, but also two along what would become H. These were the start of the shift from logging to farming.

That transition accelerated as more land was cut off and the choice trees ran out. The Omaha railroad shut down in 1939. In early August 1936 more than two thirds of Pershing was burned by wildfires, forcing fifteen families to flee their homes.

The Pershing Wildlife Area began in 1953 as a public hunting ground when Taylor County leased some less-desirable land in the towns of Pershing, Cleveland and McKinley to the state. In 1960 the county donated 3,400 acres and it has been managed by the DNR since. It now totals 7,900 acres - much of it wetlands enhanced with manmade flowages and small ponds dug into marshy areas - managed mainly for waterfowl and sharp-tailed grouse.

As of 2023, Donald is practically a ghost town with only a few houses remaining. Canadian National trains rumble by, but never stop. Much of Pershing is farmed by families: dairy, beef and crops.

== Demographics ==
As of the census of 2000, there were 180 people, 70 households, and 45 families residing in the town. The population density was 5.0 people per square mile (1.9/km^{2}). There were 92 housing units at an average density of 2.6 per square mile (1.0/km^{2}). The racial makeup of the town was 100.00% White. Hispanic or Latino of any race were 0.56% of the population.

There were 70 households, out of which 28.6% had children under the age of 18 living with them, 50.0% were married couples living together, 10.0% had a female householder with no husband present, and 34.3% were non-families. 28.6% of all households were made up of individuals, and 14.3% had someone living alone who was 65 years of age or older. The average household size was 2.57 and the average family size was 3.22.

In the town, the population was spread out, with 27.8% under the age of 18, 8.3% from 18 to 24, 22.8% from 25 to 44, 20.6% from 45 to 64, and 20.6% who were 65 years of age or older. The median age was 41 years. For every 100 females, there were 109.3 males. For every 100 females age 18 and over, there were 120.3 males.

The median income for a household in the town was $27,083, and the median income for a family was $60,833. Males had a median income of $33,750 versus $35,417 for females. The per capita income for the town was $14,607. About 8.8% of families and 14.2% of the population were below the poverty line, including 11.6% of those under the age of eighteen and 22.2% of those sixty-five or over.
