= Dell H. Richards =

American Politician

Dell H. Richards was an American politician. He was a member of the Wisconsin State Assembly.

== Biography ==
Dell H. Richards was born on July 27, 1868 in Richland Center, Wisconsin. A newspaperman by trade, he worked for several outlets, including the Appleton Post.

Richards was elected to the Assembly in 1912 as a Republican. From 1909 to 1913, he was Mayor of Ladysmith, Wisconsin. Additionally, he held seats on the County Board and the Board of Education for Rusk County, Wisconsin.
