= Donald, Wisconsin =

Unincorporated community in Wisconsin, United States

- Unincorporated community
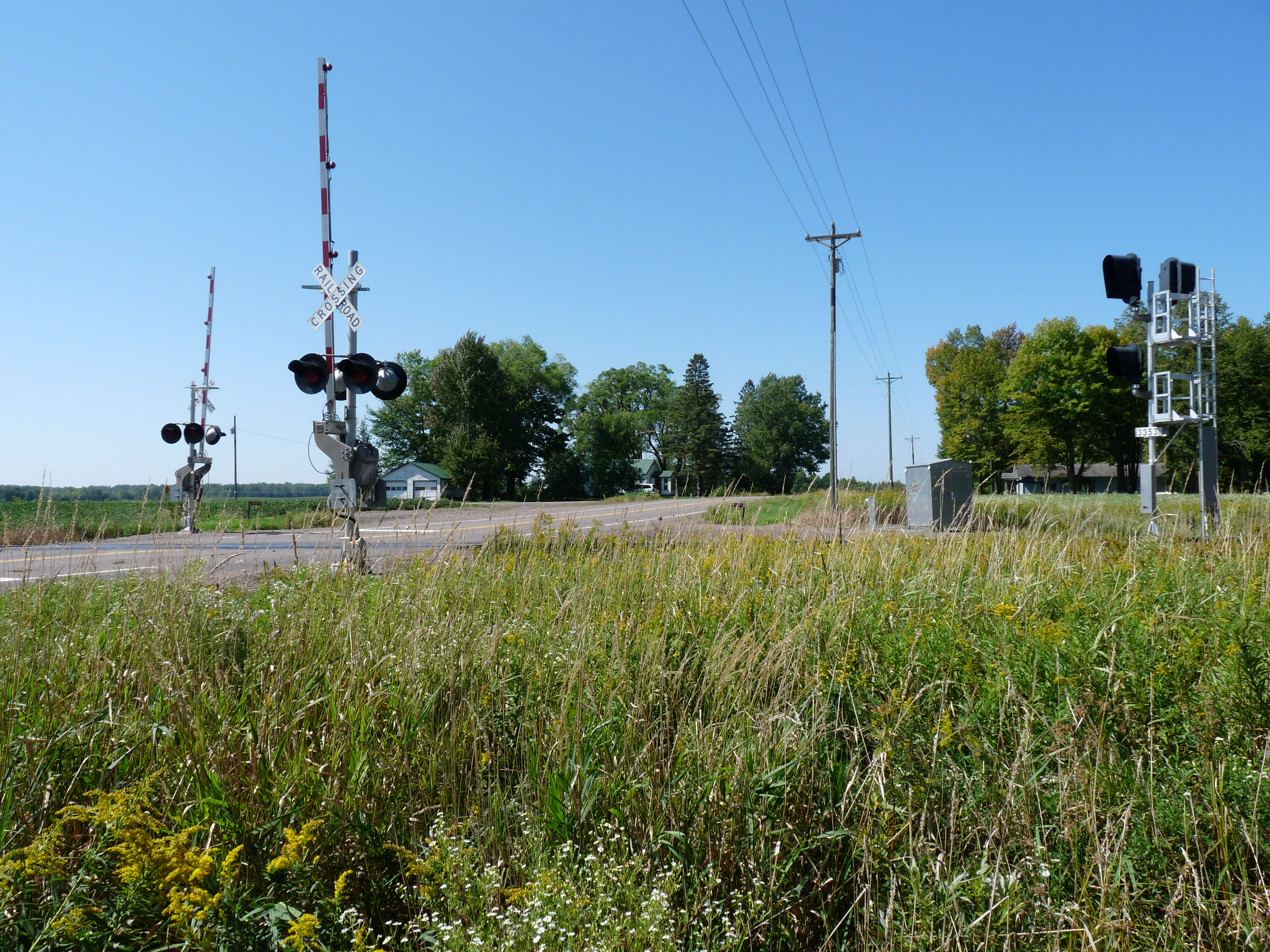

- Location within Wisconsin Location within the United States
- Coordinates: 45°15′09″N 90°53′49″W
- Country: United States
- State: Wisconsin
- County: Taylor
- Elevation: 1,201 ft (366 m)
- Time zone: UTC-6 (Central (CST))
  - Summer (DST): UTC-5 (CDT)
- Area codes: 715 & 534
- GNIS feature ID: 1564049

Donald is an unincorporated community (nearly a ghost town) located in the town of Pershing, Taylor County, Wisconsin, United States, where the Canadian National Railway crosses County Highway M.

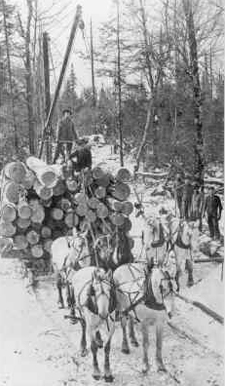
Fountain-Campbell Lumber Company in operation, 1909

== History ==
Donald was founded in 1903, where the Fountain-Campbell Lumber Company built a sawmill on the Eau Claire, Chippewa Falls, and Northeastern Railway (a.k.a. the Omaha). The community was named for Donald Campbell, the son of the president of Fountain-Campbell. Before that, the spot was called Fountain Spur, for the other principal of that company.

Donald had a boarding house for sawmill workers. A post office was established in 1904. Around 1905 the J.S. Owen Company built a line for the Wisconsin Central Railway crossing the Omaha line at Donald and heading northwest for Superior - now part of the Canadian National Railway. At some point, the Omaha RR set up a box car as Donald's depot. Donald grew to boast a school and a church.

But after the timber near Donald was depleted around 1916, Fountain-Campbell shut down their sawmill there and moved it north to Ladysmith and Crane, where timber remained. With that, Donald began to dwindle. The Omaha Railroad stopped running in the late 1930s and track was pulled up. The post office closed in 1942. As of 2023, only a few homes and the Canadian National remained.
