= Wisconsin's 7th congressional district =

U.S. House district for Wisconsin

Coordinates: 45°41′56″N 90°39′19″W

- Interactive map of district boundaries since January 3, 2023
- Representative: Tom Tiffany; R–Minocqua
- Area: 25,983.51 mi^{2} (67,297.0 km^{2})
- Distribution: 71.53% rural; 28.47% urban
- Population (2025): 750,669
- Median household income: $76,055
- Ethnicity: 88.60% White; 5.28% Two or more races; 3.18% Hispanic; 2.25% Native American; 1.84% Asian; 1.41% other; 0.62% Black; 0.01% Pacific Islander Americans
- Cook PVI: R+11
- Created: 1873

Wisconsin's 7th congressional district is a congressional district of the United States House of Representatives in northwestern and central Wisconsin; it is the largest congressional district in the state geographically, covering 20 counties (in whole or part), for a total of 18,787 sq mi. The district contains the following counties: Ashland, Barron, Bayfield, Burnett, Chippewa (partial), Clark, Douglas, Florence, Forest, Iron, Jackson (partial), Juneau (partial), Langlade, Lincoln, Marathon, Monroe (partial), Oneida, Polk, Price, Rusk, St. Croix, Sawyer, Taylor, Vilas, Washburn, and Wood (partial).

The district is currently represented by Republican Tom Tiffany.

While in 2008, the district gave 56% of the vote to Barack Obama, it has swung to the Republicans in recent presidential elections with Mitt Romney winning with 51% of the vote in 2012 and Donald Trump winning with 58% of the vote in 2016. Additionally, left-leaning Portage County (which contains the city of Stevens Point) was removed from the 7th and added to the 3rd during the hotly contested 2013 redistricting. Since these shifts, the rural 7th has surpassed the suburban 5th as the most Republican district in Wisconsin.

Agriculture is a major industry and employer in the rural 7th district. This district has been a major producer of milk from cows, grains, oilseeds, dry beans, and dry peas. 60% of the farmland in this district is used for crop production, another major economic stimulant.

== Counties and municipalities within the district ==
For the 118th and successive Congresses (based on redistricting following the 2020 census), the district contains all or portions of the following counties, towns, and municipalities:

Ashland County (16)

All 16 towns and municipalities

Barron County (36)

All 36 towns and municipalities

Bayfield County (29)

All 29 towns and municipalities

Burnett County (29)

All 29 towns and municipalities

Chippewa County (24)

Anson, Arthur, Auburn, Birch Creek, Bloomer (city), Bloomer (town), Boyd, Cadott, Cleveland, Colburn, Cooks Valley, Cornell, Delmar, Eagle Point, Estella, Goetz, Lake Holcombe, New Auburn, Ruby, Sampson, Sigel, Stanley (shared with Clark County), Tilden, Woodmohr

Clark County (46)

All 46 towns and municipalities

Douglas County (22)

All 22 towns and municipalities

Florence County (8)

All 8 towns and municipalities

Forest County (15)

All 15 towns and municipalities

Iron County (12)

All 12 towns and municipalities

Jackson County (7)

Alma (part; also 3rd), Bear Bluff, City Point, Cleveland, Garden Valley, Knapp, Merrillan (part; also 3rd)

Juneau County (8)

Armenia, Clearfield (part; also 3rd), Cutler, Finley, Germantown (part; also 3rd), Kingston, Necedah (town), Necedah (village)

Langlade County (19)

All 19 towns and municipalities

Lincoln County (18)

All 18 towns and municipalities

Marathon County (61)

All 61 towns and municipalities

Monroe County (6)

Byron, La Grange, Lincoln, Scott, Warrens, Wyeville

Oneida County (21)

All 21 towns and municipalities

Polk County (36)

All 36 towns and municipalities

Price County (22)

All 22 towns and municipalities

Rusk County (33)

All 33 towns and municipalities

Sawyer County (21)

All 21 towns and municipalities

St. Croix County (35)

All 35 towns and municipalities

Taylor County (27)

All 27 towns and municipalities

Vilas County (15)

All 15 towns and municipalities

Washburn County (25)

All 25 towns and municipalities

Wood County (18)

Arpin (town), Arpin (village), Auburndale (town), Auburndale (village), Cameron, Cary, Dexter, Hansen, Hewitt, Hiles, Lincoln, Marshfield (city) (shared with Marathon County), Marshfield (town), Pittsville, Remington, Richfield, Rock, Wood

== List of members representing the district ==
Member	Party	Years	Cong ress	Electoral history	District
District established March 4, 1873
Jeremiah Rusk (Viroqua)	Republican	March 4, 1873 – March 3, 1877	43rd 44th	Redistricted from the 6th district and re-elected in 1872. Re-elected in 1874. Retired.	Buffalo, Clark, Eau Claire, Jackson, La Crosse, Monroe, Pepin, Pierce, St. Croix, Trempealeau, & Vernon counties
Herman L. Humphrey (Hudson)	Republican	March 4, 1877 – March 3, 1883	45th 46th 47th	Elected in 1876. Re-elected in 1878. Re-elected in 1880. Lost renomination.	Buffalo, Clark, Eau Claire, Jackson, La Crosse, Monroe, Pepin, Pierce, St. Croix, Trempealeau, & Vernon counties
Gilbert M. Woodward (La Crosse)	Democratic	March 4, 1883 – March 3, 1885	48th	Elected in 1882. Lost re-election.	Crawford, Juneau, La Crosse, Monroe, Richland, Sauk, & Vernon counties
Ormsby B. Thomas (Prairie du Chien)	Republican	March 4, 1885 – March 3, 1891	49th 50th 51st	Elected in 1884. Re-elected in 1886. Re-elected in 1888. Lost re-election.	Crawford, Juneau, La Crosse, Monroe, Richland, Sauk, & Vernon counties
Frank P. Coburn (West Salem)	Democratic	March 4, 1891 – March 3, 1893	52nd	Elected in 1890. Lost re-election.	Crawford, Juneau, La Crosse, Monroe, Richland, Sauk, & Vernon counties
George B. Shaw (Eau Claire)	Republican	March 4, 1893 – August 27, 1894	53rd	Elected in 1892. Died.	Buffalo, Eau Claire, Jackson, La Crosse, Monroe, Pepin, & Trempealeau counties
Vacant		August 27, 1894 – November 5, 1894	53rd		Buffalo, Eau Claire, Jackson, La Crosse, Monroe, Pepin, & Trempealeau counties
Michael Griffin (Eau Claire)	Republican	November 5, 1894 – March 3, 1899	53rd 54th 55th	Elected to finish Shaw's term. Also elected to the next full term. Re-elected in 1896. Retired.	Buffalo, Eau Claire, Jackson, La Crosse, Monroe, Pepin, & Trempealeau counties
John J. Esch (La Crosse)	Republican	March 4, 1899 – March 3, 1921	56th 57th 58th 59th 60th 61st 62nd 63rd 64th 65th 66th	Elected in 1898. Re-elected in 1900. Re-elected in 1902. Re-elected in 1904. Re-elected in 1906. Re-elected in 1908. Re-elected in 1910. Re-elected in 1912. Re-elected in 1914. Re-elected in 1916. Re-elected in 1918. Lost renomination.	Buffalo, Eau Claire, Jackson, La Crosse, Monroe, Pepin, & Trempealeau counties
John J. Esch (La Crosse)	Republican	March 4, 1899 – March 3, 1921	56th 57th 58th 59th 60th 61st 62nd 63rd 64th 65th 66th	Elected in 1898. Re-elected in 1900. Re-elected in 1902. Re-elected in 1904. Re-elected in 1906. Re-elected in 1908. Re-elected in 1910. Re-elected in 1912. Re-elected in 1914. Re-elected in 1916. Re-elected in 1918. Lost renomination.	Buffalo, Clark, Eau Claire, Jackson, La Crosse, Monroe, Pepin, & Trempealeau counties
John J. Esch (La Crosse)	Republican	March 4, 1899 – March 3, 1921	56th 57th 58th 59th 60th 61st 62nd 63rd 64th 65th 66th	Elected in 1898. Re-elected in 1900. Re-elected in 1902. Re-elected in 1904. Re-elected in 1906. Re-elected in 1908. Re-elected in 1910. Re-elected in 1912. Re-elected in 1914. Re-elected in 1916. Re-elected in 1918. Lost renomination.	Adams, Clark, Jackson, Juneau, La Crosse, Monroe, Sauk, & Vernon counties
Joseph D. Beck (Viroqua)	Republican	March 4, 1921 – March 3, 1929	67th 68th 69th 70th	Elected in 1920. Re-elected in 1922. Re-elected in 1924. Re-elected in 1926. Retired to run for Governor of Wisconsin.	Adams, Clark, Jackson, Juneau, La Crosse, Monroe, Sauk, & Vernon counties
Merlin Hull (Black River Falls)	Republican	March 4, 1929 – March 3, 1931	71st	Elected in 1928. Lost renomination.	Adams, Clark, Jackson, Juneau, La Crosse, Monroe, Sauk, & Vernon counties
Gardner R. Withrow (La Crosse)	Republican	March 4, 1931 – March 3, 1933	72nd	Elected in 1930. Redistricted to the 3rd district.	Adams, Clark, Jackson, Juneau, La Crosse, Monroe, Sauk, & Vernon counties
Gerald J. Boileau (Wausau)	Republican	March 4, 1933 – January 3, 1935	73rd 74th 75th	Redistricted from the 8th district and re-elected in 1932. Re-elected in 1934. Re-elected in 1936. Lost re-election.	Adams, Green Lake, Langlade, Marathon, Marquette, Portage, Shawano, Waupaca, Waushara, & Wood counties
Gerald J. Boileau (Wausau)	Progressive	January 3, 1935 – January 3, 1939	73rd 74th 75th	Redistricted from the 8th district and re-elected in 1932. Re-elected in 1934. Re-elected in 1936. Lost re-election.	Adams, Green Lake, Langlade, Marathon, Marquette, Portage, Shawano, Waupaca, Waushara, & Wood counties
Reid F. Murray (Ogdensburg)	Republican	January 3, 1939 – April 29, 1952	76th 77th 78th 79th 80th 81st 82nd	Elected in 1938. Re-elected in 1940. Re-elected in 1942. Re-elected in 1944. Re-elected in 1946. Re-elected in 1948. Re-elected in 1950. Died.	Adams, Green Lake, Langlade, Marathon, Marquette, Portage, Shawano, Waupaca, Waushara, & Wood counties
Vacant		April 29, 1952 – January 3, 1953	82nd		Adams, Green Lake, Langlade, Marathon, Marquette, Portage, Shawano, Waupaca, Waushara, & Wood counties
Melvin Laird (Marshfield)	Republican	January 3, 1953 – January 21, 1969	83rd 84th 85th 86th 87th 88th 89th 90th 91st	Elected in 1952. Re-elected in 1954. Re-elected in 1956. Re-elected in 1958. Re-elected in 1960. Re-elected in 1962. Re-elected in 1964. Re-elected in 1966. Re-elected in 1968. Resigned to become U.S. Secretary of Defense.	Adams, Green Lake, Langlade, Marathon, Marquette, Portage, Shawano, Waupaca, Waushara, & Wood counties
Melvin Laird (Marshfield)	Republican	January 3, 1953 – January 21, 1969	83rd 84th 85th 86th 87th 88th 89th 90th 91st	Elected in 1952. Re-elected in 1954. Re-elected in 1956. Re-elected in 1958. Re-elected in 1960. Re-elected in 1962. Re-elected in 1964. Re-elected in 1966. Re-elected in 1968. Resigned to become U.S. Secretary of Defense.	Adams, Clark, Florence, Forest, Langlade, Lincoln, Marathon, Marquette, Menominee, Portage, Shawano, Taylor, Waupaca, Waushara, & Wood counties
Vacant		January 21, 1969 – April 1, 1969	91st		Adams, Clark, Florence, Forest, Langlade, Lincoln, Marathon, Marquette, Menominee, Portage, Shawano, Taylor, Waupaca, Waushara, & Wood counties
Dave Obey (Wausau)	Democratic	April 1, 1969 – January 3, 2011	91st 92nd 93rd 94th 95th 96th 97th 98th 99th 100th 101st 102nd 103rd 104th 105th 106th 107th 108th 109th 110th 111th	Elected to finish Laird's term. Re-elected in 1970. Re-elected in 1972. Re-elected in 1974. Re-elected in 1976. Re-elected in 1978. Re-elected in 1980. Re-elected in 1982. Re-elected in 1984. Re-elected in 1986. Re-elected in 1988. Re-elected in 1990. Re-elected in 1992. Re-elected in 1994. Re-elected in 1996. Re-elected in 1998. Re-elected in 2000. Re-elected in 2002. Re-elected in 2004. Re-elected in 2006. Re-elected in 2008. Retired.	Adams, Clark, Florence, Forest, Langlade, Lincoln, Marathon, Marquette, Menominee, Portage, Shawano, Taylor, Waupaca, Waushara, & Wood counties
Dave Obey (Wausau)	Democratic	April 1, 1969 – January 3, 2011	91st 92nd 93rd 94th 95th 96th 97th 98th 99th 100th 101st 102nd 103rd 104th 105th 106th 107th 108th 109th 110th 111th	Elected to finish Laird's term. Re-elected in 1970. Re-elected in 1972. Re-elected in 1974. Re-elected in 1976. Re-elected in 1978. Re-elected in 1980. Re-elected in 1982. Re-elected in 1984. Re-elected in 1986. Re-elected in 1988. Re-elected in 1990. Re-elected in 1992. Re-elected in 1994. Re-elected in 1996. Re-elected in 1998. Re-elected in 2000. Re-elected in 2002. Re-elected in 2004. Re-elected in 2006. Re-elected in 2008. Retired.	Ashland, Bayfield, Burnett, Chippewa, Clark, Douglas, Iron, Lincoln, Marathon, Portage, Price, Rusk, Sawyer, Taylor, Washburn, & Wood counties & most of Oneida County: All of Oneida County except for the town of Enterprise
Dave Obey (Wausau)	Democratic	April 1, 1969 – January 3, 2011	91st 92nd 93rd 94th 95th 96th 97th 98th 99th 100th 101st 102nd 103rd 104th 105th 106th 107th 108th 109th 110th 111th	Elected to finish Laird's term. Re-elected in 1970. Re-elected in 1972. Re-elected in 1974. Re-elected in 1976. Re-elected in 1978. Re-elected in 1980. Re-elected in 1982. Re-elected in 1984. Re-elected in 1986. Re-elected in 1988. Re-elected in 1990. Re-elected in 1992. Re-elected in 1994. Re-elected in 1996. Re-elected in 1998. Re-elected in 2000. Re-elected in 2002. Re-elected in 2004. Re-elected in 2006. Re-elected in 2008. Retired.	Ashland, Bayfield, Burnett, Chippewa, Douglas, Iron, Lincoln, Marathon, Portage, Price, Rusk, Sawyer, Taylor, & Washburn counties & northern Clark County, southeast Oneida County, northern Polk County, & most of Wood County: Clark County; Town of Colby; Town of Green Grove; Town of Hixon; Town of Hoard; Town of Longwood; Town of Mayville; Town of Reseburg; Town of Thorp; Town of Withee; Town of Worden; Village of Curtiss; Village of Dorchester; Village of Withee; the part of the village of Unity in the county; City of Owen; City of Thorp; the part of the city of Abbotsford in the county; the part of the city of Colby in the county; Oneida County; Town of Crescent; Town of Enterprise; Town of Monico; Town of Pelican; Town of Schoepke; City of Rhinelander; Polk County; Town of Bone Lake; Town of Clam Falls; Town of Eureka; Town of Georgetown; Town of Laketown; Town of Lorain; Town of Luck; Town of McKinley; Town of Milltown; Town of Sterling; Town of West Sweden; Villages of Frederic; Villages of Luck; Villages of Milltown; Wood County; Town of Arpin; Town of Auburndale; Town of Cameron; Town of Cary; Town of Dexter; Town of Grand Rapids; Town of Hansen; Town of Lincoln; Town of Marshfield; Town of Milladore; Town of Richfield; Town of Rock; Town of Rudolph; Town of Seneca; Town of Sherry; Town of Sigel; Town of Wood; Village of Arpin; Village of Auburndale; Village of Biron; Village of Hewitt; Village of Port Edwards; Village of Rudolph; Village of Vesper; the part of the village of Milladore in the county; City of Nekoosa; City of Pittsville; City of Wisconsin Rapids; the part of the city of Marshfield in the county
Dave Obey (Wausau)	Democratic	April 1, 1969 – January 3, 2011	91st 92nd 93rd 94th 95th 96th 97th 98th 99th 100th 101st 102nd 103rd 104th 105th 106th 107th 108th 109th 110th 111th	Elected to finish Laird's term. Re-elected in 1970. Re-elected in 1972. Re-elected in 1974. Re-elected in 1976. Re-elected in 1978. Re-elected in 1980. Re-elected in 1982. Re-elected in 1984. Re-elected in 1986. Re-elected in 1988. Re-elected in 1990. Re-elected in 1992. Re-elected in 1994. Re-elected in 1996. Re-elected in 1998. Re-elected in 2000. Re-elected in 2002. Re-elected in 2004. Re-elected in 2006. Re-elected in 2008. Retired.	1993–2003
Dave Obey (Wausau)	Democratic	April 1, 1969 – January 3, 2011	91st 92nd 93rd 94th 95th 96th 97th 98th 99th 100th 101st 102nd 103rd 104th 105th 106th 107th 108th 109th 110th 111th	Elected to finish Laird's term. Re-elected in 1970. Re-elected in 1972. Re-elected in 1974. Re-elected in 1976. Re-elected in 1978. Re-elected in 1980. Re-elected in 1982. Re-elected in 1984. Re-elected in 1986. Re-elected in 1988. Re-elected in 1990. Re-elected in 1992. Re-elected in 1994. Re-elected in 1996. Re-elected in 1998. Re-elected in 2000. Re-elected in 2002. Re-elected in 2004. Re-elected in 2006. Re-elected in 2008. Retired.	2003–2013
Sean Duffy (Wausau)	Republican	January 3, 2011 – September 23, 2019	112th 113th 114th 115th 116th	Elected in 2010. Re-elected in 2012. Re-elected in 2014. Re-elected in 2016. Re-elected in 2018. Resigned due to family health issues.	2003–2013
Sean Duffy (Wausau)	Republican	January 3, 2011 – September 23, 2019	112th 113th 114th 115th 116th	Elected in 2010. Re-elected in 2012. Re-elected in 2014. Re-elected in 2016. Re-elected in 2018. Resigned due to family health issues.	2013–2023
Vacant		September 23, 2019 – May 19, 2020	116th		2013–2023
Tom Tiffany (Minocqua)	Republican	May 19, 2020 – present	116th 117th 118th 119th	Elected to finish Duffy's term. Re-elected in 2020. Re-elected in 2022. Re-elected in 2024. Retired to run for governor.	2013–2023
Tom Tiffany (Minocqua)	Republican	May 19, 2020 – present	116th 117th 118th 119th	Elected to finish Duffy's term. Re-elected in 2020. Re-elected in 2022. Re-elected in 2024. Retired to run for governor.	2023–present
Michael Alfonso (Hayward)	Republican	Assuming office on January 3, 2027		Elected in 2026.	2023–present

== Recent election results ==
=== 2002 district boundaries (2002–2011) ===
Year	Date	Elected				Defeated				Total	Plurality
2002	Nov. 5	Dave Obey (inc)	Democratic	146,364	64.21%	Joe Rothbauer	Rep.	81,518	35.76%	227,955	64,846
2004	Nov. 2	Dave Obey (inc)	Democratic	241,306	85.64%	Mike Miles	Grn.	26,518	9.41%	281,752	214,788
2004	Nov. 2	Dave Obey (inc)	Democratic	241,306	85.64%	Larry Oftedahl	Con.	12,841	4.56%	281,752	214,788
2006	Nov. 7	Dave Obey (inc)	Democratic	161,903	62.17%	Nick Reid	Rep.	91,069	34.97%	260,428	70,834
2006	Nov. 7	Dave Obey (inc)	Democratic	161,903	62.17%	Mike Miles	Grn.	7,391	2.84%	260,428	70,834
2008	Nov. 4	Dave Obey (inc)	Democratic	212,666	60.79%	Dan Mielke	Rep.	136,938	39.14%	349,837	75,728
2010	Nov. 2	Sean Duffy	Republican	132,551	52.11%	Julie Lassa	Dem.	113,018	44.43%	254,389	19,533
2010	Nov. 2	Sean Duffy	Republican	132,551	52.11%	Gary Kauther	Ind.	8,397	3.30%	254,389	19,533

=== 2011 district boundaries (2012–2021) ===
Year	Date	Elected				Defeated				Total	Plurality
2012	Nov. 6	Sean Duffy (inc)	Republican	201,720	56.08%	Pat Kreitlow	Dem.	157,524	43.80%	359,669	44,196
2012	Nov. 6	Sean Duffy (inc)	Republican	201,720	56.08%	Dale C. Lehner (write-in)	Ind.	20	0.01%	359,669	44,196
2014	Nov. 4	Sean Duffy (inc)	Republican	169,891	59.28%	Kelly Westlund	Dem.	112,949	39.41%	286,603	56,942
2014	Nov. 4	Sean Duffy (inc)	Republican	169,891	59.28%	Lawrence Dale	Ind.	3,686	1.29%	286,603	56,942
2014	Nov. 4	Sean Duffy (inc)	Republican	169,891	59.28%	Tob Taylor (write-in)	Ind.	30	0.01%	286,603	56,942
2014	Nov. 4	Sean Duffy (inc)	Republican	169,891	59.28%	John Schiess (write-in)	Ind.	5	0.00%	286,603	56,942
2016	Nov. 8	Sean Duffy (inc)	Republican	223,418	61.67%	Mary Hoeft	Dem.	138,643	38.27%	362,271	84,775
2018	Nov. 6	Sean Duffy (inc)	Republican	194,061	60.11%	Margaret Engebretson	Dem.	124,307	38.50%	322,840	69,754
2018	Nov. 6	Sean Duffy (inc)	Republican	194,061	60.11%	Ken Driessen	Ind.	4,416	1.37%	322,840	69,754
2020(special)	May 12	Tom Tiffany	Republican	109,498	57.11%	Tricia Zunker	Dem.	82,135	42.84%	191,720	27,363
2020(special)	May 12	Tom Tiffany	Republican	109,498	57.11%	Michael Opela (write-in)	Rep.	3	0.00%	191,720	27,363
2020(special)	May 12	Tom Tiffany	Republican	109,498	57.11%	Dennis Paulaha (write-in)	Ind.	2	0.00%	191,720	27,363
2020	Nov. 3	Tom Tiffany (inc)	Republican	252,048	60.73%	Tricia Zunker	Dem.	162,741	39.21%	415,007	89,307

=== 2022 district boundaries (2022–2031) ===
Year	Date	Elected				Defeated				Total	Plurality
2022	Nov. 8	Tom Tiffany (inc)	Republican	209,224	61.85%	Richard Dick Ausman	Dem.	128,877	38.10%	338,268	80,347
2024	Nov. 5	Tom Tiffany (inc)	Republican	273,553	63.6%	Kyle Kilbourn	Dem.	156,524	36.4%	430,384	

== Recent election results from statewide races ==
Year	Office	Results
2008	President	Obama 53% - 45%
2010	Senate	Johnson 55% - 43%
2010	Governor	Walker 56% - 42%
2010	Secretary of State	King 52% - 48%
2010	Attorney General	Van Hollen 60% - 39%
2010	Treasurer	Schuller 56% - 44%
2012	President	Romney 52% - 48%
2012	Senate	Thompson 49% - 48%
2012	Governor (Recall)	Walker 59% - 40%
2014	Governor	Walker 58% - 41%
2014	Secretary of State	Bradley 51% - 46%
2014	Attorney General	Schimel 57% - 40%
2014	Treasurer	Adamczyk 52% - 41%
2016	President	Trump 57% - 37%
2016	Senate	Johnson 57% - 40%
2018	Senate	Vukmir 52% - 48%
2018	Governor	Walker 57% - 41%
2018	Secretary of State	Schroeder 56% - 44%
2018	Attorney General	Schimel 57% - 41%
2018	Treasurer	Hartwig 55% - 43%
2020	President	Trump 59% - 39%
2022	Senate	Johnson 61% - 39%
2022	Governor	Michels 58% - 40%
2022	Secretary of State	Loudenbeck 58% - 38%
2022	Attorney General	Toney 59% - 41%
2022	Treasurer	Leiber 60% - 38%
2024	President	Trump 60% - 38%
2024	Senate	Hovde 59% - 39%

== See also ==
- Wisconsin's congressional districts
- List of United States congressional districts
