= Auburn, Wisconsin =

Auburn, Wisconsin may refer to:

- Auburn, Chippewa County, Wisconsin, a town
- Auburn, Fond du Lac County, Wisconsin, a town
