= Colburn, Wisconsin =

Colburn is the name of some places in the U.S. state of Wisconsin:

- Colburn, Adams County, Wisconsin, a town
- Colburn, Chippewa County, Wisconsin, a town
- Colburn (community), Wisconsin, an unincorporated community
