= John E. Prince =

American politician (1868–1947)

John E. Prince (January 3, 1868 – October 15, 1947) was an American businessman and politician.

Born in the town of Auburn, Chippewa County, Wisconsin, Prince was a farmer and member of the American Society of Equality. He also owned Prince's Resort on Cornel Lake. He supported the cooperative movement and helped start the first cooperative creamery in Chippewa County. Prince served on the Auburn Town Board and served on the school board as treasurer. In 1933, Prince served in the Wisconsin State Assembly and was a Republican.
