= Brownville, Wisconsin =

- Unincorporated community
- Location within Wisconsin Location within the United States
- Coordinates: 45°01′53″N 90°56′01″W
- Country: United States
- State: Wisconsin
- County: Chippewa
- Towns: Colburn, Delmar
- Elevation: 1,152 ft (351 m)

Population (2019)
  - Total: 596
- Time zone: UTC-6 (Central (CST))
  - Summer (DST): UTC-5 (CDT)
- Area codes: 715 & 534
- GNIS feature ID: 1577527

Brownville is an unincorporated community located in the towns of Colburn and Delmar, in Chippewa County, Wisconsin, United States.
