= Goetz, Wisconsin =

- Town
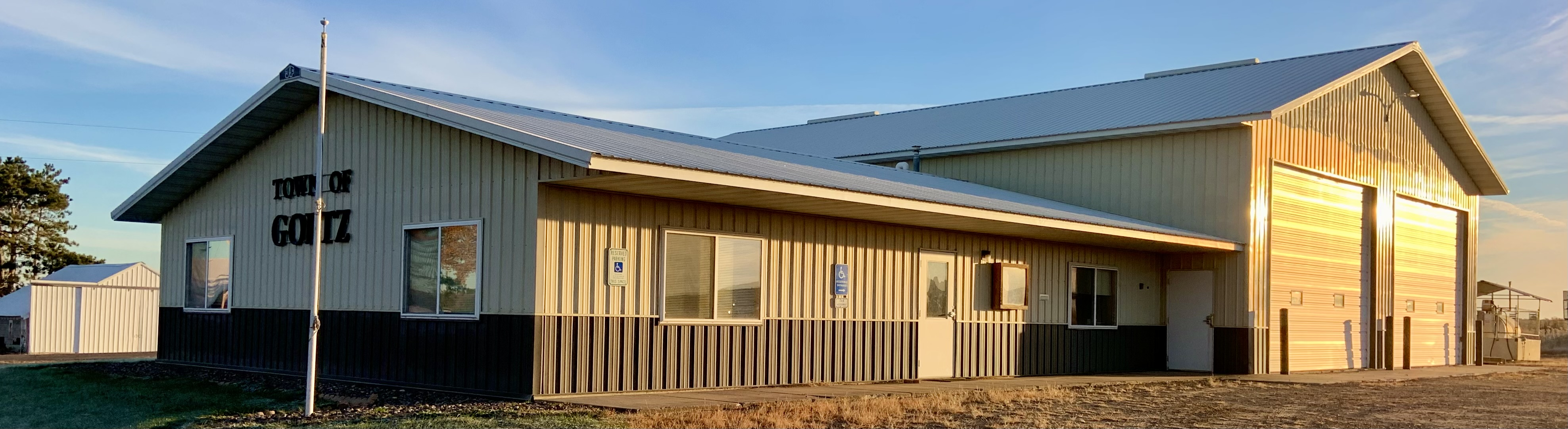
- Town hall

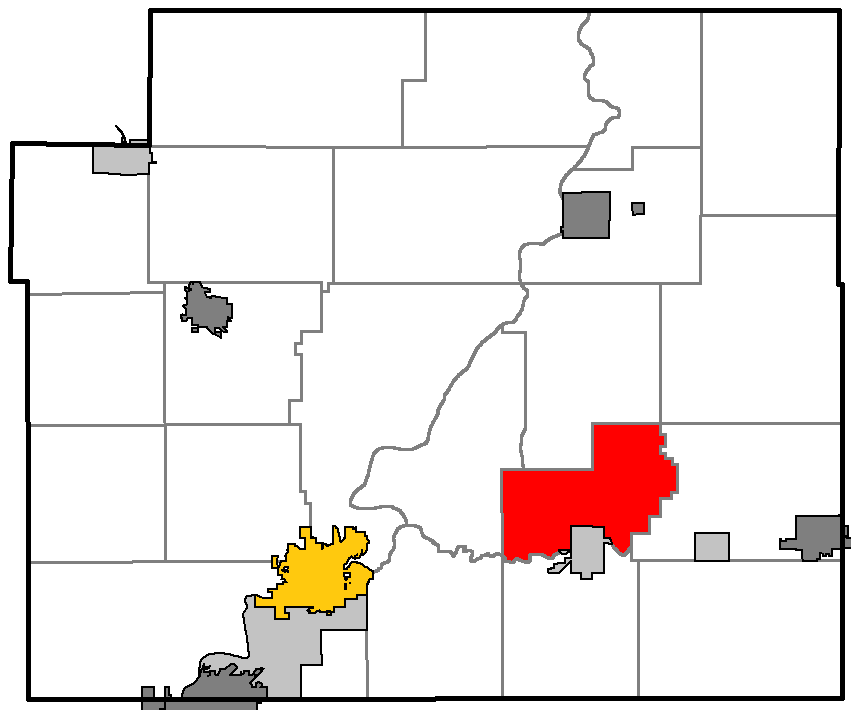
- Location of Goetz within Chippewa County

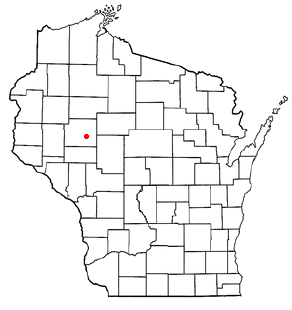
- Location of Goetz, Wisconsin
- Coordinates: 44°58′52″N 91°9′27″W
- Country: United States
- State: Wisconsin
- County: Chippewa

Area
  - Total: 29.9 sq mi (77.4 km^{2})
  - Land: 29.8 sq mi (77.1 km^{2})
  - Water: 0.12 sq mi (0.3 km^{2})
- Elevation: 1,010 ft (308 m)

Population (2020)
  - Total: 813
  - Density: 27.3/sq mi (10.5/km^{2})
- Time zone: UTC-6 (Central (CST))
  - Summer (DST): UTC-5 (CDT)
- Area codes: 715 & 534
- FIPS code: 55-29700
- GNIS feature ID: 1583288
- PLSS township: Parts of T29N R6W and T29N R7W

Goetz is a town in Chippewa County in the U.S. state of Wisconsin. The population was 813 at the 2020 census.

== Geography ==
The town of Goetz is located in southeastern Chippewa County. It is bordered to the south by the Yellow River, a west-flowing tributary of the Chippewa River, and by the village of Cadott.

According to the United States Census Bureau, the town has a total area of 29.9 square miles (77.4 km^{2}), of which 29.8 square miles (77.1 km^{2}) is land and 0.1 square miles (0.3 km^{2}), or 0.35%, is water.

== History ==
The outlines of the 6-mile squares that would become the Town of Goetz were first surveyed in the fall of 1848 by crews working for the U.S. government. In October 1849, a crew marked all the section lines of the eastern six by six square, walking the woods and swamps on foot, measuring with chain and compass. When done, the deputy surveyor filed this general description:

A considerable portion of this Township is good agricultural lands. It is generally level and well watered by numerous brooks & creeks. In the South East quarter of Section 14 there is an encloserrer and loging Cabin claimed and occupied by Joseph Thepania. Also in Section 13, about the centre, (in today's town of Delmar) there is an enclosure and cabin occupied by John Shaw. Near these cabins there is much valuable Pine timber. Yellow River which flows through the Eastern and Southern parts affords an easy and convenient mode of getting the timber to market. The Township is heavily wooded with Birch, Sugar, Lind, Elm, Maple, Pine & oak.

For the surveyors' description of the six by six square that contains western Goetz, see Anson.

When Goetz was formed in 1887, the new town was named after Henry Goetz, a farmer who had immigrated from Germany in 1860.

== Demographics ==
Historical population
Census	Pop.	Note	%±
1990	640		—
2000	695		8.6%
2010	762		9.6%
2020	813		6.7%

As of the census of 2000, there were 695 people, 231 households, and 198 families residing in the town. The population density was 23.2 people per square mile (9.0/km^{2}). There were 235 housing units at an average density of 7.9 per square mile (3.0/km^{2}). The racial makeup of the town was 98.56% White, 0.14% African American, 0.43% Native American, 0.14% Asian, 0.58% from other races, and 0.14% from two or more races. Hispanic or Latino of any race were 1.29% of the population.

There were 231 households, out of which 47.6% had children under the age of 18 living with them, 73.2% were married couples living together, 6.9% had a female householder with no husband present, and 13.9% were non-families. 9.5% of all households were made up of individuals, and 5.6% had someone living alone who was 65 years of age or older. The average household size was 3.01 and the average family size was 3.19.

In the town, the population was spread out, with 32.1% under the age of 18, 6.0% from 18 to 24, 30.5% from 25 to 44, 23.0% from 45 to 64, and 8.3% who were 65 years of age or older. The median age was 35 years. For every 100 females, there were 112.5 males. For every 100 females age 18 and over, there were 109.8 males.

The median income for a household in the town was $39,028, and the median income for a family was $39,722. Males had a median income of $28,571 versus $21,250 for females. The per capita income for the town was $15,871. About 6.5% of families and 6.4% of the population were below the poverty line, including 8.4% of those under age 18 and 3.6% of those age 65 or over.

== Education ==
The town is served by the School District of Cadott Community.
