= Chippewa County, Wisconsin =

County in Wisconsin, United States

- County
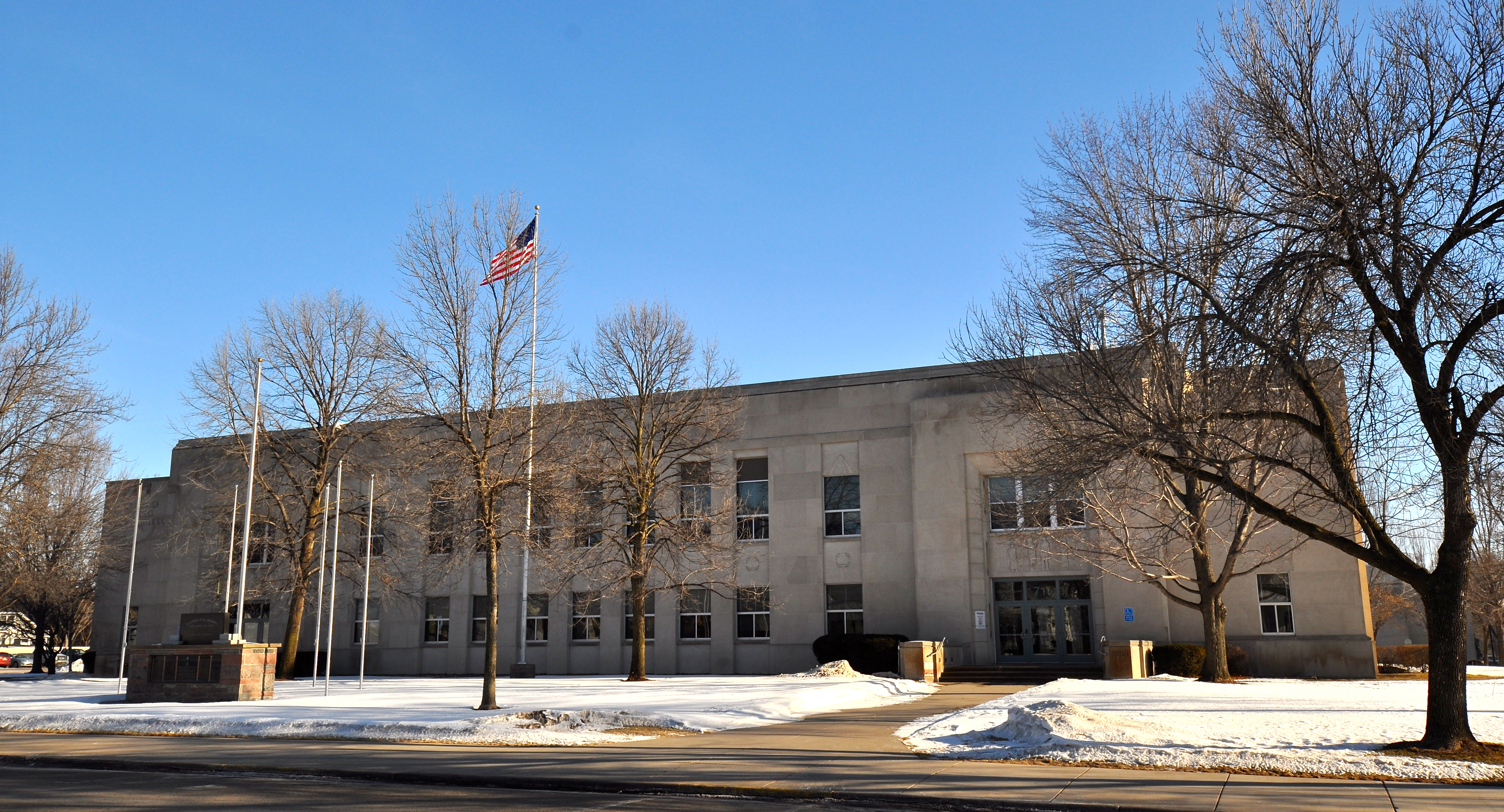
- Chippewa County Courthouse, February 2015

- Location within the U.S. state of Wisconsin
- Coordinates: 45°04′N 91°17′W
- Country: United States
- State: Wisconsin
- Founded: 1853
- Named for: Ojibwa
- Seat: Chippewa Falls
- Largest city: Chippewa Falls

Area
  - Total: 1,041 sq mi (2,700 km^{2})
  - Land: 1,008 sq mi (2,610 km^{2})
  - Water: 33 sq mi (85 km^{2}) 3.2%

Population (2020)
  - Total: 66,297
  - Estimate (2025): 67,614 ▲
  - Density: 65.77/sq mi (25.39/km^{2})
- Time zone: UTC−6 (Central)
  - Summer (DST): UTC−5 (CDT)
- Congressional districts: 3rd, 7th
- Website: www.chippewacountywi.gov

Chippewa County (/ˈtʃɪpəwɔː/) is a county located in the U.S. state of Wisconsin. It is named for the indigenous Chippewa people, also known as the Ojibwe, who historically controlled this territory. As of the 2020 census, the population was 66,297. Its county seat is Chippewa Falls. The county was founded in 1845 from Crawford County, then in the Wisconsin Territory, and organized in 1853. Chippewa County is included in the Eau Claire metropolitan area as well as the Eau Claire–Menomonie Combined Statistical Area.

== Geography ==
According to the U.S. Census Bureau, the county has a total area of 1,041 square miles (2,700 km^{2}), of which 1,008 square miles (2,610 km^{2}) is land and 33 square miles (85 km^{2}) (3.2%) is water.

The most visible natural features of Chippewa County are the Flambeau Ridge west of Holcombe - highest point in the county - and the Chippewa River which bends around that promontory, flows through the Holcombe Flowage, flows south and west through the middle of the county to Lake Wissota, and exits the county between Chippewa Falls and Eau Claire. Tributary streams include O'Neil and Duncan Creeks from the west and the Jump, Fisher and Yellow Rivers from the east. A band of choppy hills and small lakes arcs from Taylor county and the Otter Lake area in the east, south of Cornell, through Long Lake in the northwest, and into Rusk County. Above that, east of Holcombe is a fairly flat area. South of the choppy band, much of the county is big hills with streams and rivers cutting through, with fertile plains along the streams and rivers.

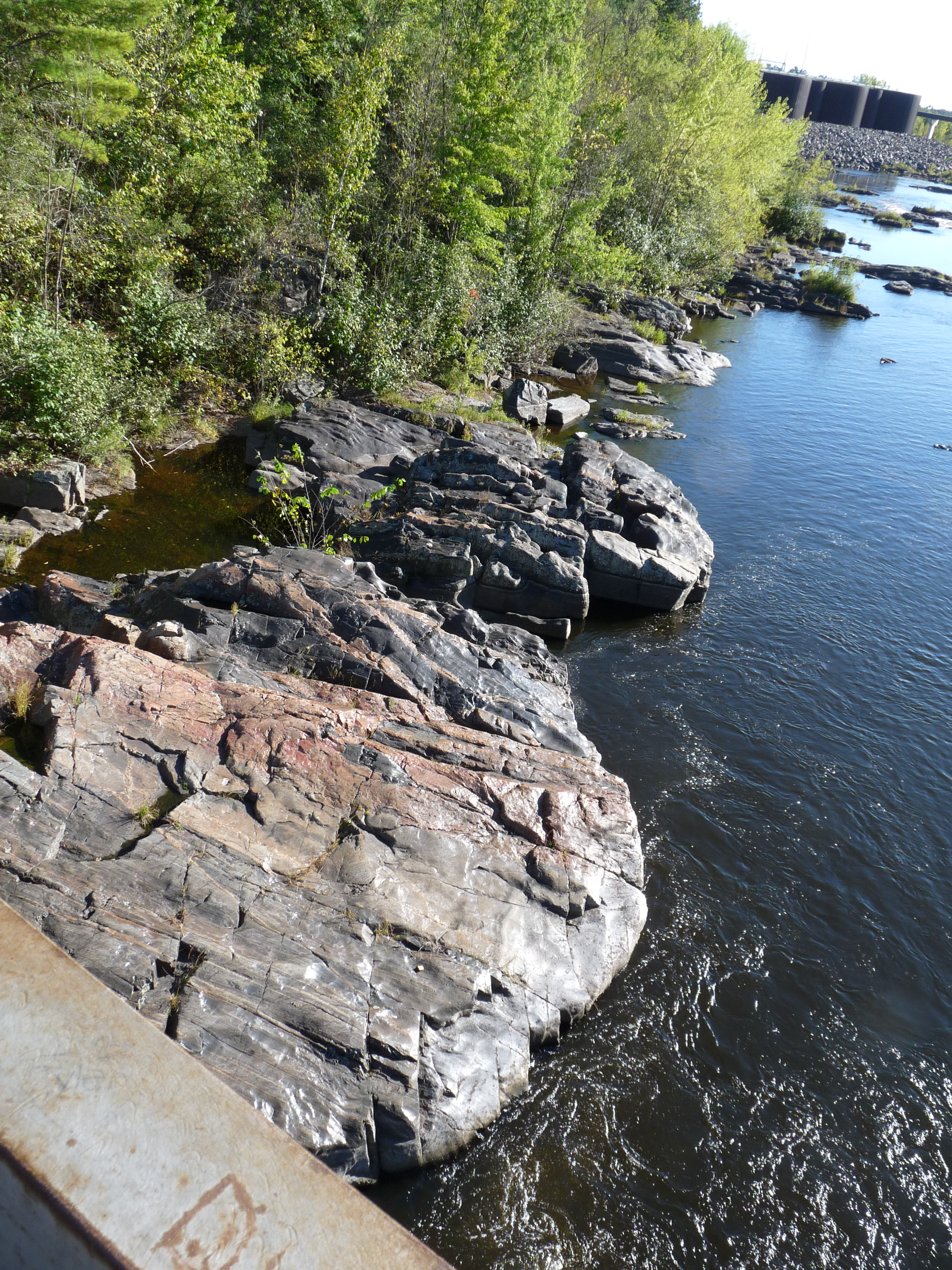
Bedrock below the abandoned County Y bridge near Jim Falls

The geological story of the county begins with the ancient bedrock exposed by the rivers and streams, especially below dams like at Jim Falls. This bedrock consists mostly of felsic gneiss and amphibolite laid down over 2,500 million years ago, then metamorphosed and folded, with granite injected into its cracks during a collision of plates about 1,850 million years ago. For hundreds of millions of years after, the area was covered by seas in which various layers of sand were laid down and compressed into sandstone. The canyon at Irvine Park in Chippewa Falls exposes both Precambrian metamorphic rock below and sandstone above. The bottom/oldest layer of sandstone is Mount Simon sandstone - found as far away as Kentucky, but named for its outcrop in the Eau Claire park. The core of the Flambeau Ridge is a deposit of conglomerate quartzite that developed in the Mount Simon sandstone layer. For hundreds of millions of years after, other layers of sandstone were laid on top, up to 550 feet (168 m) thick, and then eroded away in places. Harder than the surrounding sandstone, Flambeau Ridge survived, standing above its surroundings.

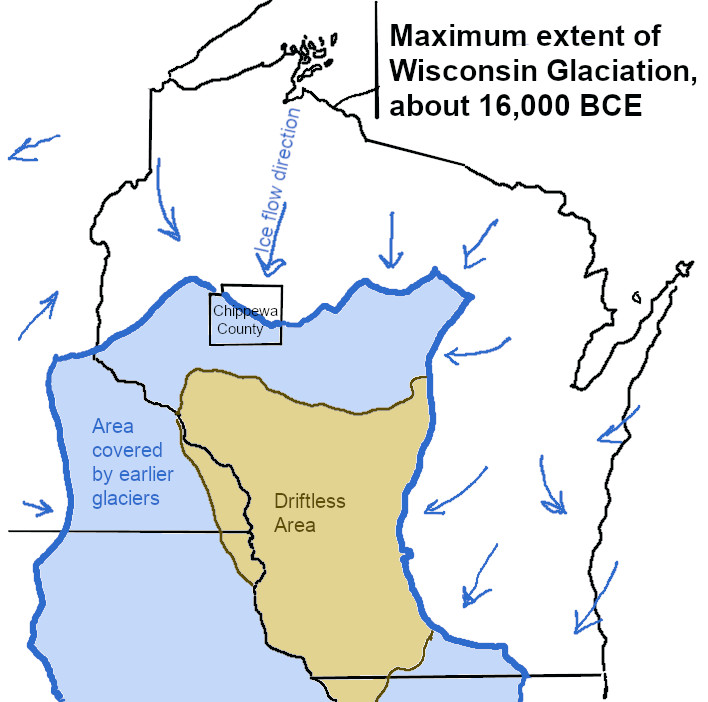
Maximum extent of the Wisconsin Glaciation and previous ones relative to Chippewa County

Much of Chippewa County's now-visible terrain was shaped by glaciers. Over the last two million years, ice sheets have advanced into the area from Canada and retreated several times. The last advance reached its maximum extent about 18,000 years ago, covering the north half of the county, then retreated. This sheet was probably several hundred feet thick at its leading edge, and it acted like a bulldozer, grinding and pushing soil and boulders along with it. When it melted back out of this country, it left a terminal moraine across the county - the band of choppy hills that runs from Otter Lake to Long Lake, which the Ice Age Trail follows. Elsewhere the glaciers left 50 to 100 feet of glacial till (sediment) on top of the bedrock. East of Holcombe this till plain is fairly flat. The southern half of the county is mostly a rolling till plain from some earlier ice sheet which pushed even farther south. As the glacier melted back, huge amounts of water and material flowed out of it, repeatedly filling the river valleys with sediment, producing fertile plains like the one north of Chippewa Falls, and then recutting the river channels. At some point ice blocked the Chippewa near Holcombe, making the Jump River and possibly the Chippewa itself flow east of Holcombe through the wide channel where the Fisher River now flows.

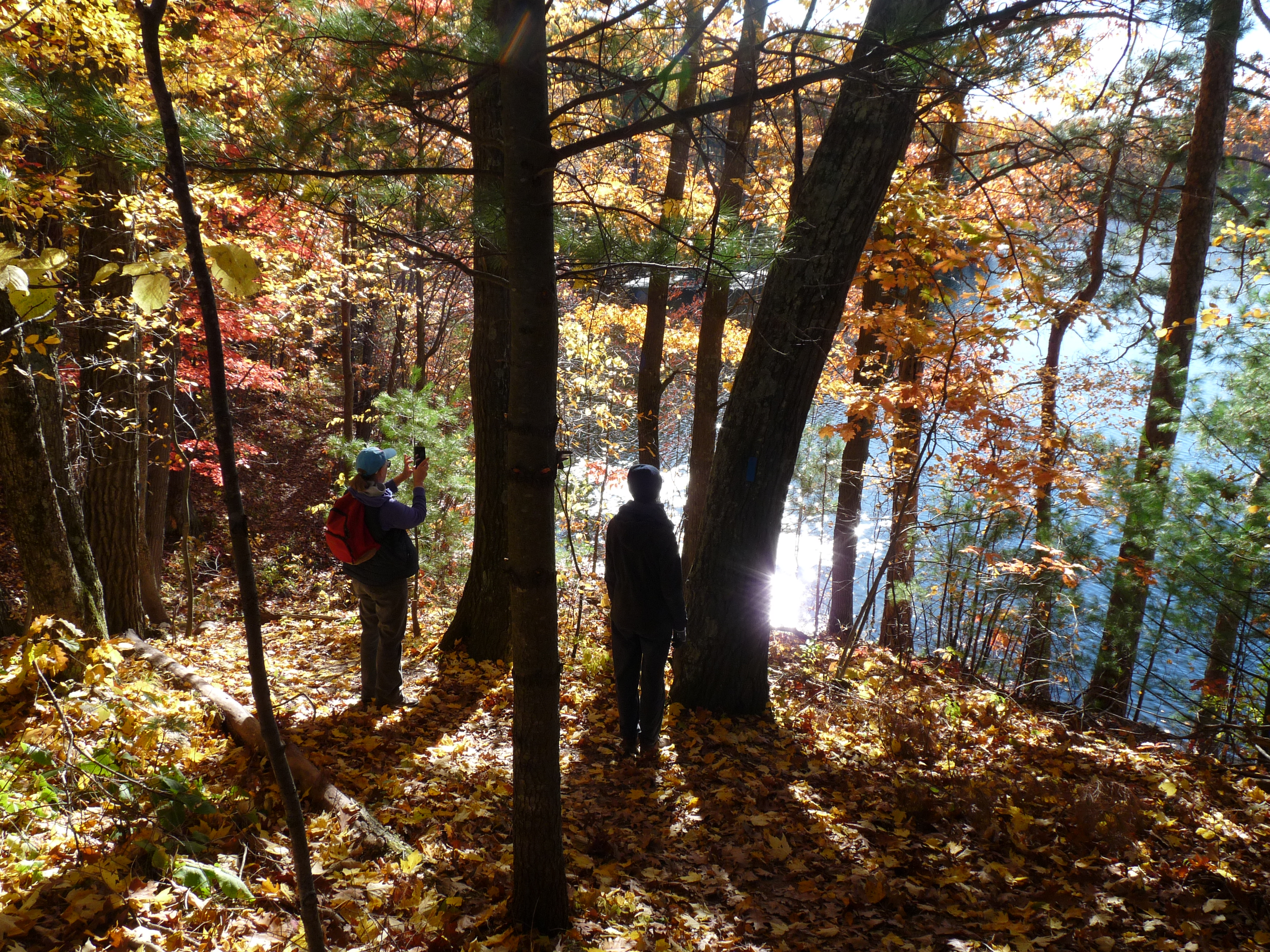
October view of Picnic Lake from the Ice Age Trail west of Cornell

The county's terrain includes textbook examples of many glacial landforms: the drumlins south of Cadott and Stanley, the kettle lakes left by buried blocks of ice near the Ice Age Interpretive Center east of New Auburn, the eskers along Otter Lake, the tunnel channel that Otter Lake lies in, and ice-walled lake plains like those north of Plummer Lake. The Ice Age Trail threads through some of this country, providing close-up foot access to many of these unusual features.

=== Adjacent counties ===
- Rusk County – north
- Taylor County – east
- Clark County – southeast
- Eau Claire County – south
- Dunn County – west
- Barron County – northwest

=== Major highways ===
- U.S. Highway 12
- U.S. Highway 53
- Highway 27 (Wisconsin)
- Highway 29 (Wisconsin)
- Highway 40 (Wisconsin)
- Highway 64 (Wisconsin)
- Highway 124 (Wisconsin)
- Highway 178 (Wisconsin)

=== Railroads ===
- Union Pacific
- Wisconsin Northern Railroad
- Canadian National

=== Buses ===
- Eau Claire Transit

=== Airports ===
- KEAU - Chippewa Valley Regional Airport
- 4WI9 - Cornell Municipal Airport

== Demographics ==
Historical population
Census	Pop.	Note	%±
1850	615		—
1860	1,895		208.1%
1870	8,311		338.6%
1880	15,491		86.4%
1890	25,143		62.3%
1900	33,037		31.4%
1910	32,103		−2.8%
1920	36,482		13.6%
1930	37,342		2.4%
1940	40,703		9.0%
1950	42,839		5.2%
1960	45,096		5.3%
1970	47,717		5.8%
1980	52,127		9.2%
1990	52,360		0.4%
2000	55,195		5.4%
2010	62,415		13.1%
2020	66,297		6.2%
2025 (est.)	67,614	▲	2.0%
U.S. Decennial Census; 1790–1960 1900–1990; 1990–2000 2010 2020

=== Racial and ethnic composition ===
Chippewa County, Wisconsin – Racial and ethnic composition Note: the US Census treats Hispanic/Latino as an ethnic category. This table excludes Latinos from the racial categories and assigns them to a separate category. Hispanics/Latinos may be of any race.
Race / ethnicity (NH = Non-Hispanic)	Pop 1980	Pop 1990	Pop 2000	Pop 2010	Pop 2020	% 1980	% 1990	% 2000	% 2010	% 2020
White alone (NH)	51,740	51,740	53,831	59,028	60,391	99.26%	98.82%	97.53%	94.57%	91.09%
Black or African American alone (NH)	24	31	85	961	1,040	0.05%	0.06%	0.15%	1.54%	1.57%
Native American or Alaska Native alone (NH)	89	143	168	272	323	0.17%	0.27%	0.30%	0.44%	0.49%
Asian alone (NH)	100	268	491	770	959	0.19%	0.51%	0.89%	1.23%	1.45%
Native Hawaiian or Pacific Islander alone (NH)	x	x	8	11	14	x	x	0.01%	0.02%	0.02%
Other race alone (NH)	31	4	24	16	153	0.06%	0.01%	0.04%	0.03%	0.23%
Mixed race or Multiracial (NH)	x	x	299	557	2,160	x	x	0.54%	0.89%	3.26%
Hispanic or Latino (any race)	143	174	289	800	1,257	0.27%	0.33%	0.52%	1.28%	1.90%
Total	52,127	52,360	55,195	62,415	66,297	100.00%	100.00%	100.00%	100.00%	100.00%

=== 2020 census ===
As of the 2020 census, the county had a population of 66,297. The median age was 41.7 years, 22.3% of residents were under the age of 18, and 19.1% of residents were 65 years of age or older. For every 100 females there were 107.2 males, and for every 100 females age 18 and over there were 108.3 males age 18 and over.

The population density was 65.7 people per square mile (25.4 people/km^{2}). There were 28,688 housing units at an average density of 28.5 units per square mile (11.0 units/km^{2}).

There were 26,287 households in the county, of which 27.9% had children under the age of 18 living with them. Of all households, 52.0% were married-couple households, 18.3% were households with a male householder and no spouse or partner present, and 21.1% were households with a female householder and no spouse or partner present. About 27.6% of all households were made up of individuals and 12.4% had someone living alone who was 65 years of age or older.

Of those housing units, 8.4% were vacant. Among occupied housing units, 73.7% were owner-occupied and 26.3% were renter-occupied. The homeowner vacancy rate was 0.8% and the rental vacancy rate was 4.7%.

The racial makeup of the county was 91.8% White, 1.6% Black or African American, 0.5% American Indian and Alaska Native, 1.5% Asian, <0.1% Native Hawaiian and Pacific Islander, 0.6% from some other race, and 4.0% from two or more races. Hispanic or Latino residents of any race comprised 1.9% of the population.

37.5% of residents lived in urban areas, while 62.5% lived in rural areas.

=== 2000 census ===
2000 Census Age Pyramid for Chippewa County

As of the census of 2000, there were 55,195 people, 21,356 households, and 15,013 families residing in the county. The population density was 55 people per square mile (21 people/km^{2}). There were 22,821 housing units at an average density of 23 units per square mile (8.9 units/km^{2}). The racial makeup of the county was 97.85% White, 0.16% Black or African American, 0.32% Native American, 0.89% Asian, 0.01% Pacific Islander, 0.17% from other races, and 0.60% from two or more races. 0.52% of the population were Hispanic or Latino of any race. 44.1% were of German, 15.8% Norwegian and 5.8% Irish ancestry.

There were 21,356 households, out of which 33.70% had children under the age of 18 living with them, 58.30% were married couples living together, 8.00% had a female householder with no husband present, and 29.70% were non-families. 24.70% of all households were made up of individuals, and 11.00% had someone living alone who was 65 years of age or older. The average household size was 2.53 and the average family size was 3.03.

In the county, the population was spread out, with 26.50% under the age of 18, 7.70% from 18 to 24, 28.20% from 25 to 44, 23.10% from 45 to 64, and 14.60% who were 65 years of age or older. The median age was 38 years. For every 100 females, there were 99.10 males. For every 100 females age 18 and over, there were 96.00 males.

In 2017, there were 624 births, giving a general fertility rate of 59.7 births per 1000 women aged 15–44, the 26th lowest rate out of all 72 Wisconsin counties. Additionally, there were fewer than five reported induced abortions performed on women of Chippewa County residence in 2017.

== Economy ==
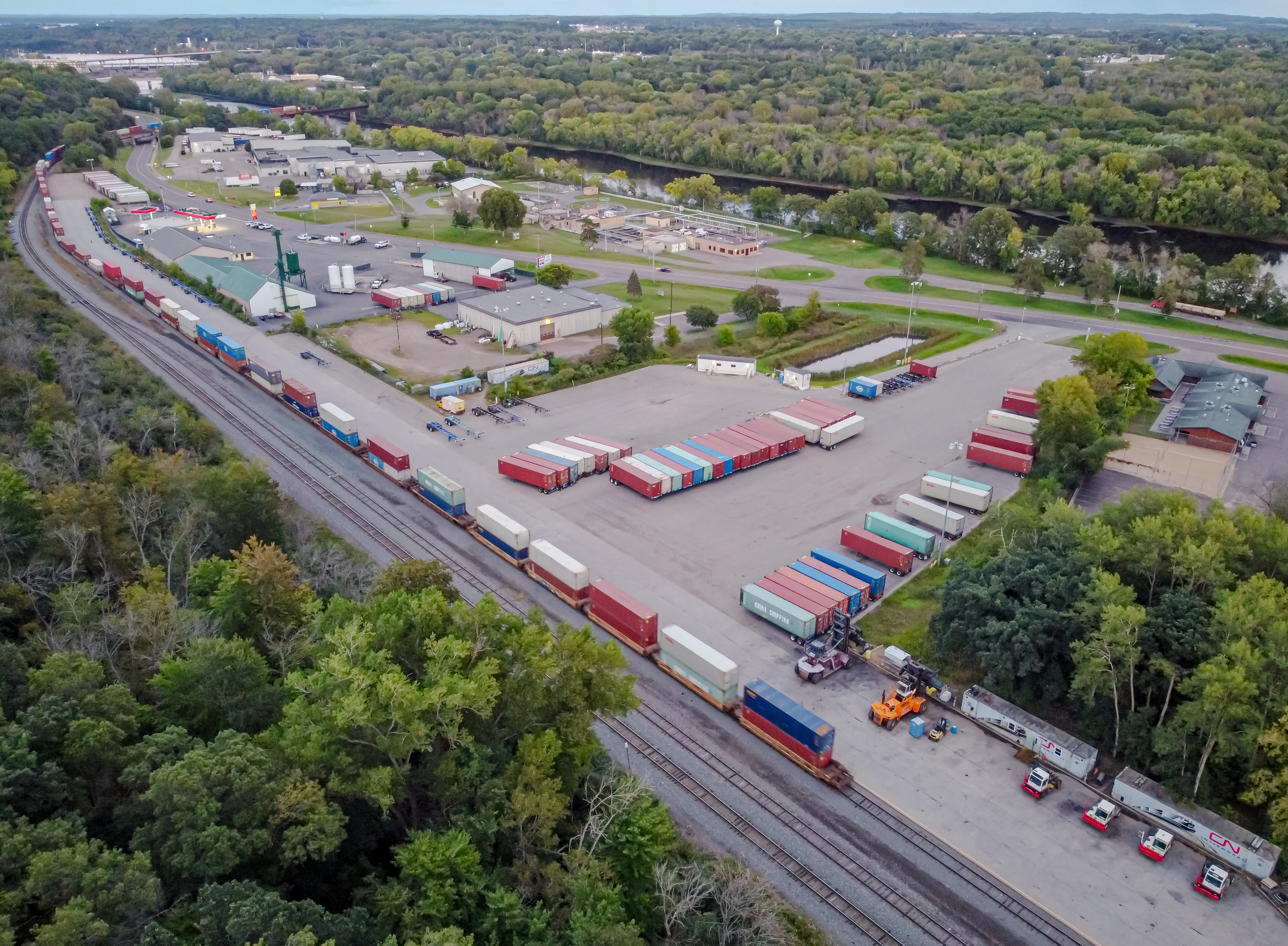
Small intermodal terminal in Chippewa Falls on the Canadian National line.

The largest employers in Chippewa County are:

1	TTM Advanced Circuits
2	Chippewa Falls Public Schools
3	Saint Joseph's Hospital
4	Wisconsin Department of Corrections
5	Wal-Mart
6	Mason Companies Inc
7	Chippewa County
8	Mayo Health System
9	Silicon Graphics International
10	Cooperative Educational Service Agency #10

== Library ==
The University of Wisconsin-Eau Claire's Special Collections and Archives, located on the fifth floor of McIntyre Library, houses an extensive collection of public records, books and collections relating to Chippewa County. In addition to vital records (birth and marriage) dating to 1907, there are also naturalization records, census records, and civil and circuit court records. These resources are very popular with local genealogists.

Within the local history collection, there are books about immigration to the region, logging, church and cemetery records, reminiscences by local residents, and a number of histories and biographies compiled by local historians.

Special Collections and Archives also houses numerous archives files which relate to Chippewa County. There are many collections which pertain to logging, the railway industry and agriculture.

The University of Wisconsin-Eau Claire's Special Collections and Archives also includes information for Buffalo, Clark, Eau Claire, Rusk and Taylor counties.

== Communities ==
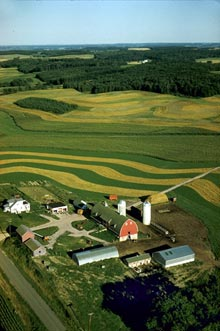
A farm in Chippewa County

=== Cities ===
- Bloomer
- Chippewa Falls (county seat)
- Cornell
- Eau Claire (mostly in Eau Claire County)
- Stanley (partly in Clark County)

=== Villages ===
- Boyd
- Cadott
- Lake Hallie
- New Auburn (partly in Barron County)

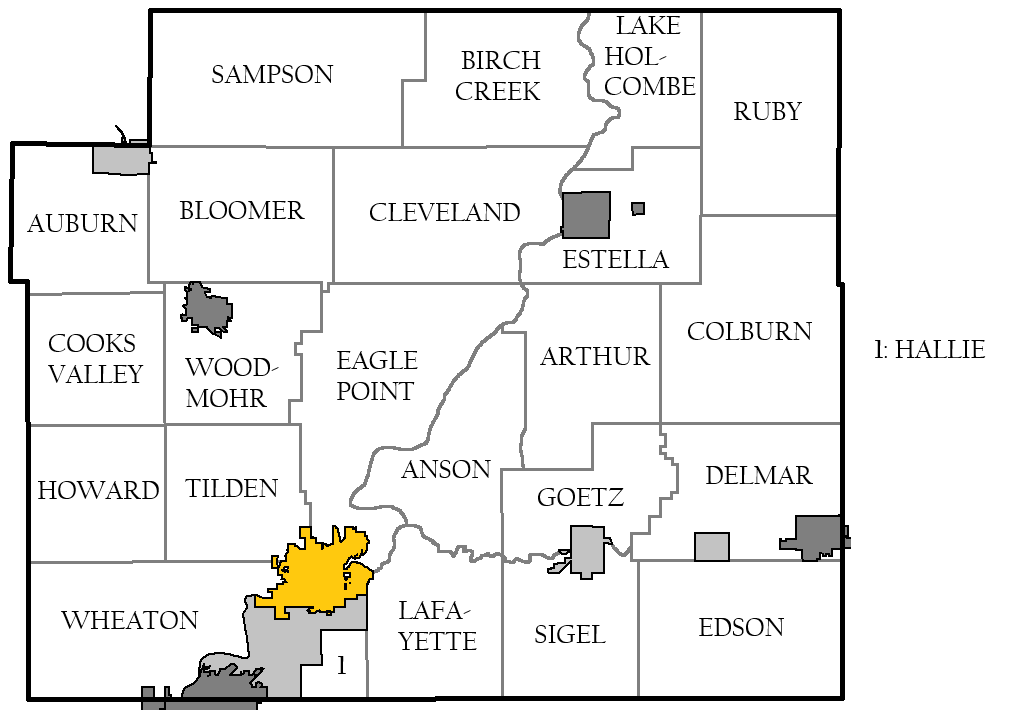
Towns of Chippewa County

=== Towns ===
- Anson
- Arthur
- Auburn
- Birch Creek
- Bloomer
- Cleveland
- Colburn
- Cooks Valley
- Delmar
- Eagle Point
- Edson
- Estella
- Goetz
- Hallie
- Howard
- Lafayette
- Lake Holcombe
- Ruby
- Sampson
- Sigel
- Tilden
- Wheaton
- Woodmohr

=== Census-designated places ===
- Holcombe
- Jim Falls
- Lake Wissota

=== Other unincorporated communities ===
- Albertville
- Anson
- Arnold
- Bateman
- Brownville
- Cobban
- Colburn
- Crescent
- Drywood
- Eagle Point
- Eagleton
- Edson
- Howard
- Huron
- Maple Hill
- Old Albertville
- Pine Grove
- Ruby
- Tilden

== Politics ==
United States presidential election results for Chippewa County, Wisconsin
Year	Republican		Democratic		Third party(ies)	
Year	No.	%	No.	%	No.	%
1892	1,975	39.48%	2,530	50.57%	498	9.95%
1896	3,601	54.09%	2,929	44.00%	127	1.91%
1900	4,215	61.88%	2,446	35.91%	151	2.22%
1904	3,744	66.49%	1,670	29.66%	217	3.85%
1908	3,526	59.07%	2,203	36.91%	240	4.02%
1912	1,736	33.93%	2,028	39.63%	1,353	26.44%
1916	3,324	58.15%	2,233	39.07%	159	2.78%
1920	6,750	82.57%	1,103	13.49%	322	3.94%
1924	5,135	41.72%	560	4.55%	6,613	53.73%
1928	7,514	55.41%	5,985	44.13%	62	0.46%
1932	4,792	35.71%	8,445	62.92%	184	1.37%
1936	5,760	38.93%	7,854	53.08%	1,182	7.99%
1940	8,781	54.30%	7,250	44.83%	140	0.87%
1944	7,691	53.59%	6,567	45.76%	93	0.65%
1948	6,146	43.58%	7,702	54.62%	254	1.80%
1952	11,429	64.01%	6,380	35.73%	45	0.25%
1956	9,781	59.42%	6,617	40.20%	63	0.38%
1960	8,690	46.95%	9,793	52.90%	28	0.15%
1964	6,277	36.46%	10,911	63.38%	26	0.15%
1968	7,772	47.38%	7,335	44.72%	1,296	7.90%
1972	8,451	49.35%	8,210	47.95%	462	2.70%
1976	8,137	40.50%	11,538	57.42%	418	2.08%
1980	10,531	48.06%	9,836	44.89%	1,545	7.05%
1984	10,986	51.45%	10,202	47.78%	163	0.76%
1988	9,757	45.69%	11,447	53.61%	150	0.70%
1992	8,215	32.56%	10,487	41.57%	6,528	25.87%
1996	7,520	35.59%	9,647	45.65%	3,964	18.76%
2000	12,835	49.04%	12,102	46.24%	1,236	4.72%
2004	15,450	50.62%	14,751	48.33%	323	1.06%
2008	13,492	44.63%	16,239	53.72%	500	1.65%
2012	15,322	49.53%	15,237	49.26%	373	1.21%
2016	17,916	56.75%	11,887	37.66%	1,765	5.59%
2020	21,317	59.32%	13,983	38.91%	638	1.78%
2024	23,399	60.82%	14,573	37.88%	499	1.30%

At the presidential level, Chippewa County leans Republican; however, Barack Obama won the county in 2008. In 2024, Donald Trump received 60.8 percent of the vote, the best result for a Republican in the county since Dwight D. Eisenhower in 1952.

== See also ==
- National Register of Historic Places listings in Chippewa County, Wisconsin
