= Colburn, Chippewa County, Wisconsin =

Town of Colburn, Wisconsin
- Town
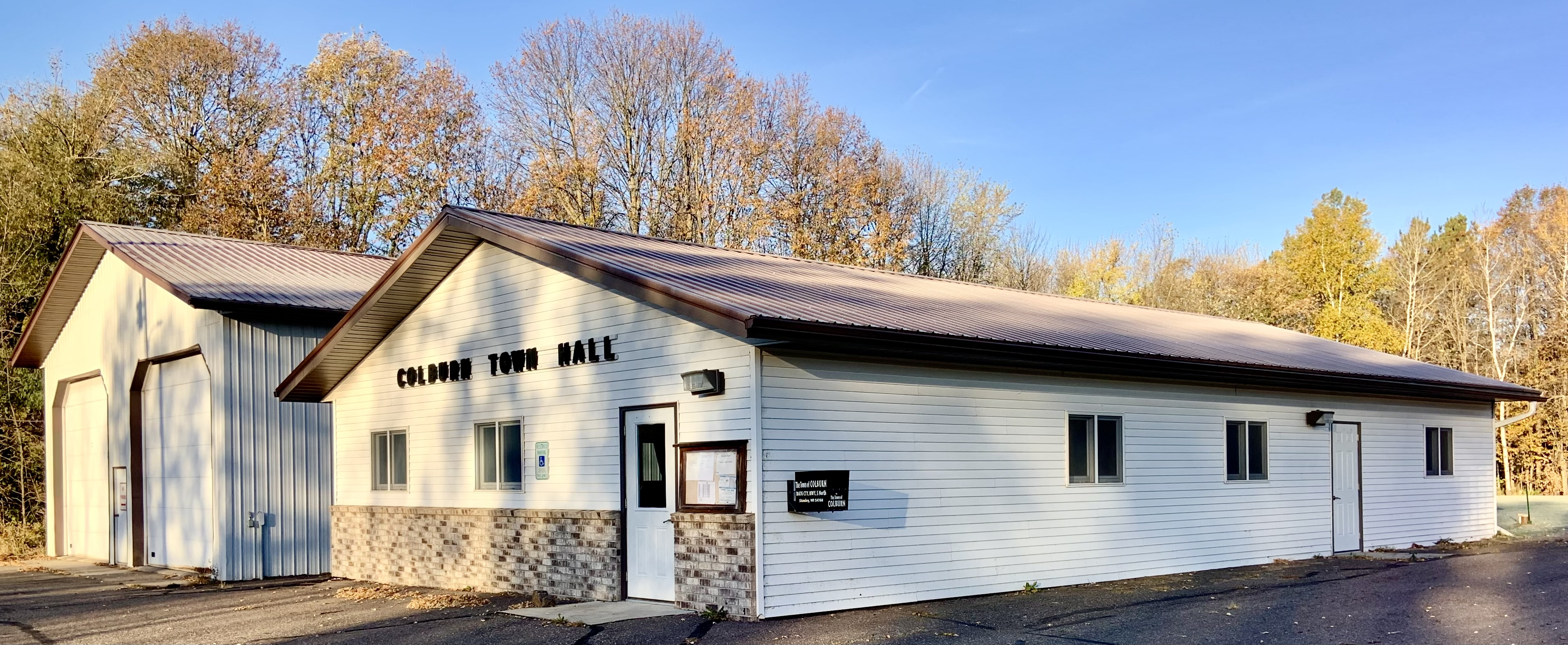
- Town hall

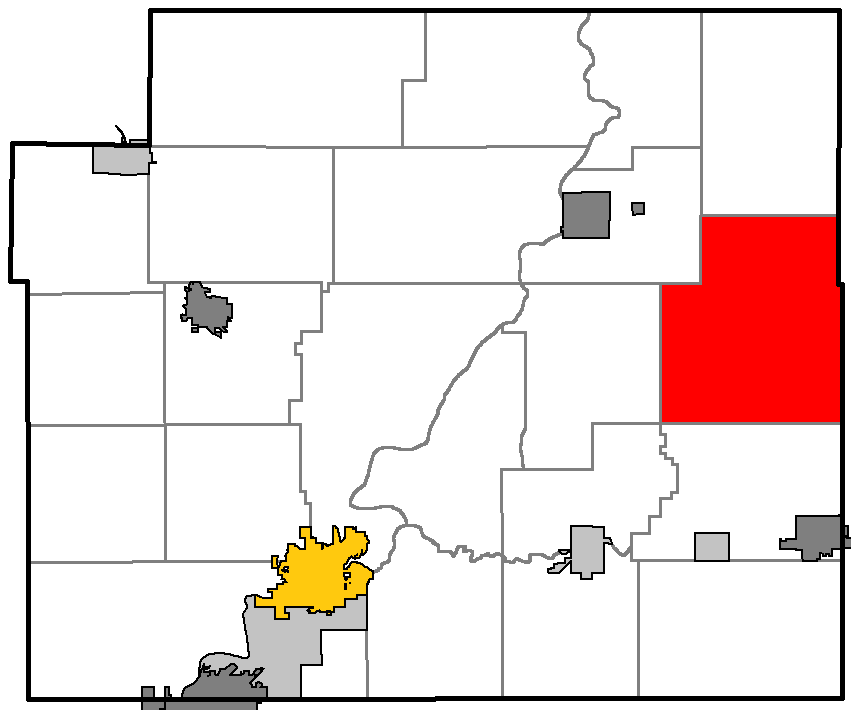
- Location of Colburn within Chippewa County

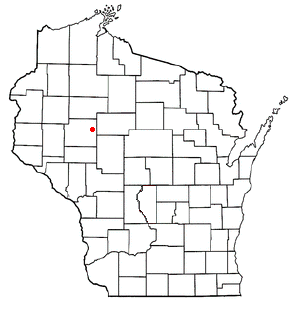
- Location of Colburn
- Coordinates: 45°5′54″N 90°59′34″W
- Country: United States
- State: Wisconsin
- County: Chippewa

Area
  - Total: 66.4 sq mi (172.0 km^{2})
  - Land: 64.8 sq mi (167.8 km^{2})
  - Water: 1.7 sq mi (4.3 km^{2})
- Elevation: 1,080 ft (330 m)

Population (2020)
  - Total: 892
  - Density: 13.8/sq mi (5.32/km^{2})
- Time zone: UTC-6 (Central (CST))
  - Summer (DST): UTC-5 (CDT)
- Area codes: 715 & 534
- FIPS code: 55-16125
- GNIS feature ID: 1582996
- PLSS township: T30N R5W and parts of T30N R6W and T31N R5W
- Website: https://www.townofcolburnwi.com/

Colburn is a town in Chippewa County in the U.S. state of Wisconsin. The population was 892 at the 2020 census, up from 856 at the 2010 census. The unincorporated communities of Colburn and Huron are located in the town. The unincorporated community of Brownville is located partially in the town.

== Education ==
The town is served by the School District of Cadott Community, Stanley-Boyd School District, Gilman School District, and Cornell School District.

== Geography ==
Colburn is located in eastern Chippewa County and is bordered to the east by Taylor County. The town covers an 8-by-9-mile (13 by 14 km) rectangle, except for a bite taken by the town of Estella from the northwest corner.

According to the United States Census Bureau, the town of Colburn has a total area of 66.4 square miles (172.0 km^{2}), of which 64.8 square miles (167.8 km^{2}) is land and 1.7 square miles (4.3 km^{2}), or 2.47%, is water. The Yellow River, a tributary of the Chippewa River, flows from northeast to southwest through the town. Otter Lake is in the eastern part of the town.

== History ==
The outlines of the 6-mile squares that would become Colburn were surveyed from 1847 into the early 1850s by crews working for the U.S. government. In November 1849 a crew marked all the section corners of the 6-mile square that is now entirely within Colburn, walking the woods and swamps on foot, measuring with chain and compass. When done, the deputy surveyor filed this general description:

There is but little land fit for agricultural purposes in this Township. The surface is level and Swampy. There is Some good Pine in it – Considerable Hemlock and Fir, Birch, Sugar, Ash [?]. Yellow River runs through the Township from North to South. This river is valuable particularly on account of the many mill prieleges[?] which it affords – The current is generally Swift, the bottom hard and the banks in many places sufficiently high and rocky.

== Demographics ==
Historical population
Census	Pop.	Note	%±
1990	731		—
2000	727		−0.5%
2010	856		17.7%
2020	892		4.2%

As of the census of 2000, there were 727 people, 262 households, and 193 families residing in the town. The population density was 11.2 people per square mile (4.3/km^{2}). There were 289 housing units at an average density of 4.4 per square mile (1.7/km^{2}). The racial makeup of the town was 97.80% White, 0.41% Native American, 0.69% Asian, 0.96% from other races, and 0.14% from two or more races.

There were 262 households, out of which 35.5% had children under the age of 18 living with them, 65.6% were married couples living together, 3.4% had a female householder with no husband present, and 26.3% were non-families. 20.2% of all households were made up of individuals, and 9.9% had someone living alone who was 65 years of age or older. The average household size was 2.77 and the average family size was 3.23.

The population was 29.3% under the age of 18, 6.5% from 18 to 24, 24.3% from 25 to 44, 25.0% from 45 to 64, and 14.9% who were 65 years of age or older. The median age was 39 years. For every 100 females, there were 109.5 males. For every 100 females age 18 and over, there were 109.8 males.

The median income for a household in the town was $35,625, and the median income for a family was $41,136. Males had a median income of $26,932 versus $22,708 for females. The per capita income for the town was $17,068. About 8.2% of families and 10.2% of the population were below the poverty line, including 8.5% of those under age 18 and 14.7% of those age 65 or over.
