= Boyd, Wisconsin =

- Village
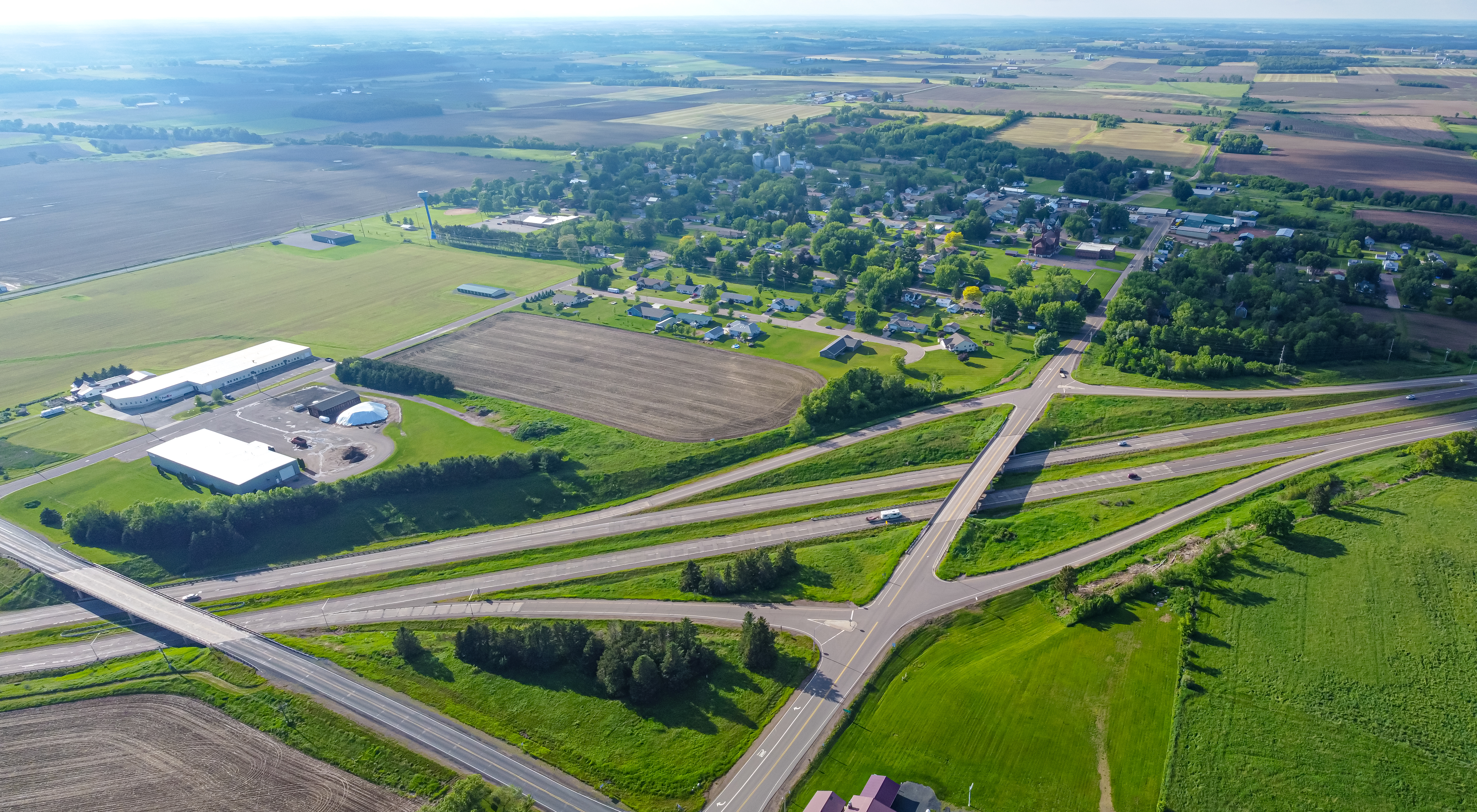
- Wis-29 runs by town

- Location of Boyd in Chippewa County, Wisconsin.
- Coordinates: 44°57′7″N 91°2′21″W
- Country: United States
- State: Wisconsin
- County: Chippewa
- Town: Delmar

Area
  - Total: 1.85 sq mi (4.80 km^{2})
  - Land: 1.85 sq mi (4.80 km^{2})
  - Water: 0 sq mi (0.00 km^{2})
- Elevation: 1,109 ft (338 m)

Population (2020)
  - Total: 605
  - Density: 326/sq mi (126/km^{2})
- Time zone: UTC-6 (Central (CST))
  - Summer (DST): UTC-5 (CDT)
- Area codes: 715 & 534
- FIPS code: 55-09075
- GNIS feature ID: 1582849
- Website: boydwi.gov

Boyd is an autonomous village in the town of Delmar, Chippewa County, Wisconsin, United States. The population was 605 at the 2020 census.

== Geography ==
Boyd is located at 44°57′7″N 91°2′21″W (44.951890, -91.039134), several miles west of Stanley in the same town, and also settled and platted when the Wisconsin Central Railroad built its line through the area.

According to the United States Census Bureau, the village has a total area of 1.85 square miles (4.79 km^{2}), all land.

== Demographics ==
Historical population
| Census | Pop. | Note | %± |
|---|---|---|---|
| 1890 | 545 | | — |
| 1900 | 674 | | 23.7% |
| 1910 | 527 | | −21.8% |
| 1920 | 478 | | −9.3% |
| 1930 | 540 | | 13.0% |
| 1940 | 618 | | 14.4% |
| 1950 | 619 | | 0.2% |
| 1960 | 622 | | 0.5% |
| 1970 | 574 | | −7.7% |
| 1980 | 660 | | 15.0% |
| 1990 | 683 | | 3.5% |
| 2000 | 680 | | −0.4% |
| 2010 | 552 | | −18.8% |
| 2020 | 605 | | 9.6% |
U.S. Decennial Census

2000 Census Age Pyramid for Eau Claire County

=== 2010 census ===
As of the census of 2010, there were 552 people, 237 households, and 150 families living in the village. The population density was 298.4 inhabitants per square mile (115.2/km^{2}). There were 253 housing units at an average density of 136.8 per square mile (52.8/km^{2}). The racial makeup of the village was 97.8% White, 0.4% African American, 0.4% Native American, 0.2% Asian, 0.2% from other races, and 1.1% from two or more races. Hispanic or Latino of any race were 0.7% of the population.

There were 237 households, of which 27.0% had children under the age of 18 living with them, 51.1% were married couples living together, 7.6% had a female householder with no husband present, 4.6% had a male householder with no wife present, and 36.7% were non-families. 29.1% of all households were made up of individuals, and 14.7% had someone living alone who was 65 years of age or older. The average household size was 2.31 and the average family size was 2.81.

The median age in the village was 40.7 years. 22.1% of residents were under the age of 18; 6.9% were between the ages of 18 and 24; 25.6% were from 25 to 44; 26.8% were from 45 to 64; and 18.5% were 65 years of age or older. The gender makeup of the village was 50.0% male and 50.0% female.

=== 2000 census ===
As of the census of 2000, there were 680 people, 274 households, and 178 families living in the village. The population density was 367.5 people per square mile (141.9/km^{2}). There were 290 housing units at an average density of 156.7 per square mile (60.5/km^{2}). The racial makeup of the village was 99.71% White, 0.15% African American, 0.15% from other races. Hispanic or Latino of any race were 0.15% of the population.

There were 274 households, out of which 33.6% had children under the age of 18 living with them, 54.7% were married couples living together, 7.7% had a female householder with no husband present, and 34.7% were non-families. 27.4% of all households were made up of individuals, and 14.6% had someone living alone who was 65 years of age or older. The average household size was 2.48 and the average family size was 3.09.

In the village, the population was spread out, with 27.8% under the age of 18, 6.0% from 18 to 24, 28.8% from 25 to 44, 20.1% from 45 to 64, and 17.2% who were 65 years of age or older. The median age was 37 years. For every 100 females, there were 103.0 males. For every 100 females age 18 and over, there were 95.6 males.

The median income for a household in the village was $37,250, and the median income for a family was $46,875. Males had a median income of $27,273 versus $19,732 for females. The per capita income for the village was $15,738. About 2.8% of families and 4.7% of the population were below the poverty line, including 1.1% of those under age 18 and 13.3% of those age 65 or over.

== Education ==
The village of Boyd is served by the Stanley-Boyd Area School District.

== See also ==
- List of villages in Wisconsin
