= Cleveland, Chippewa County, Wisconsin =

Cleveland, Wisconsin
- Town
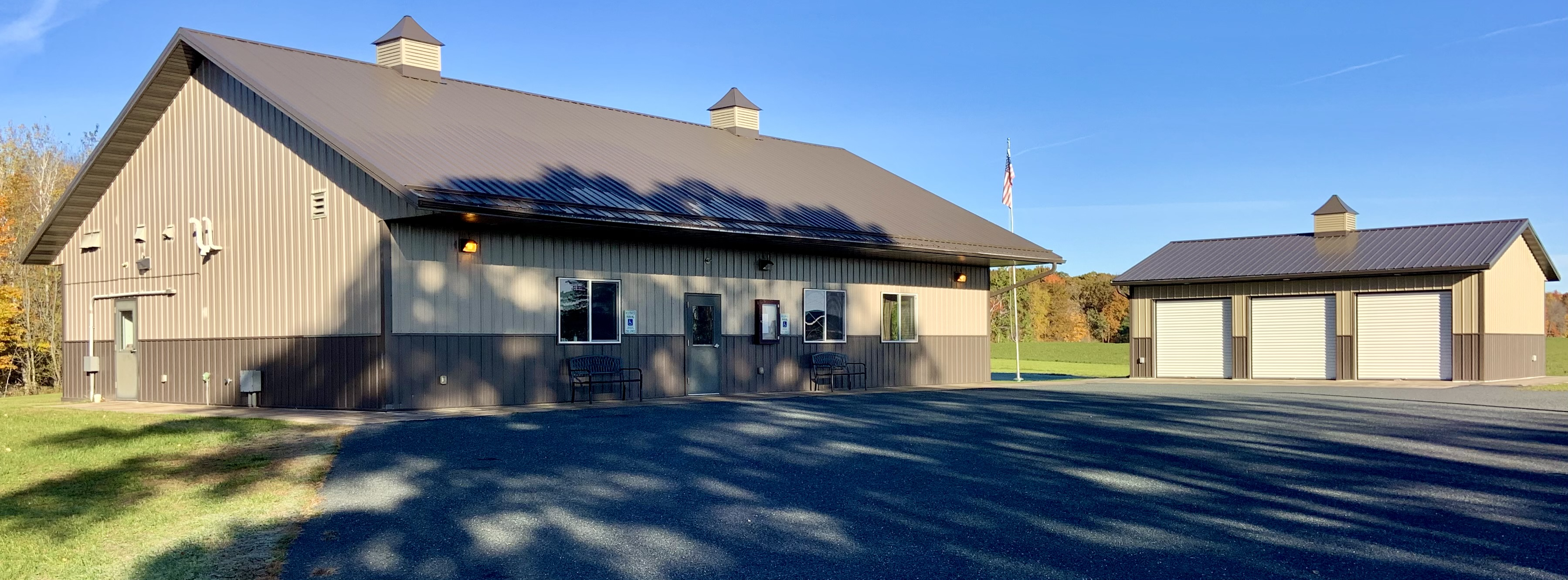
- Town hall

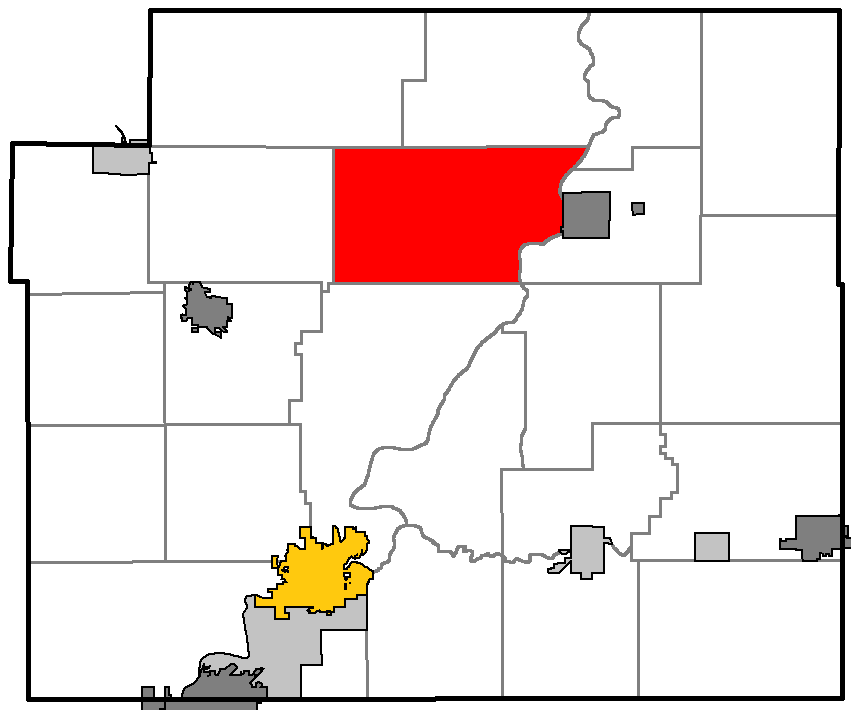
- Location of Cleveland within Chippewa County

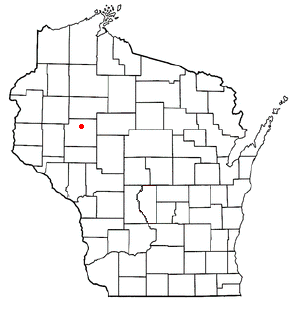
- Location of Cleveland, Wisconsin
- Coordinates: 45°10′6″N 91°17′50″W
- Country: United States
- State: Wisconsin
- County: Chippewa

Area
  - Total: 56.3 sq mi (145.8 km^{2})
  - Land: 54.0 sq mi (139.8 km^{2})
  - Water: 2.3 sq mi (6.0 km^{2})
- Elevation: 1,210 ft (370 m)

Population (2020)
  - Total: 889
  - Density: 16.5/sq mi (6.36/km^{2})
- Time zone: UTC-6 (Central (CST))
  - Summer (DST): UTC-5 (CDT)
- Area codes: 715 & 534
- FIPS code: 55-15350
- GNIS feature ID: 1582974
- PLSS township: Eastern 4 miles of T31N R8W, most of T31N R7W and bits of T31N R6W west of the Chippewa River
- Website: https://clevelandtownship.com/

Cleveland is a town in Chippewa County, Wisconsin, United States. The population was 889 at the 2020 census.

== Geography ==
Cleveland is in north-central Chippewa County; the town forms roughly a rectangle, 6 miles (10 km) north to south and about 9 miles (14 km) east to west, but with the east end cut off by the Chippewa River. It is also bordered to the east by the city of Cornell. According to the United States Census Bureau, the town has a total area of 56.3 square miles (145.8 km^{2}), of which 54.0 square miles (139.8 km^{2}) is land and 2.3 square miles (6.0 km^{2}), or 4.08%, is water.

== History ==
The six-mile squares that would become Cleveland were first surveyed in summer of 1847 by a crew working for the U.S. government. In September 1852 a different crew marked all the section corners of the township, walking through the woods and wading the swamps, measuring with chain and compass. When done, the deputy surveyor filed this general description of the six by six mile square which overlays the middle-east of the modern township:

This Township contains one large Swamp timbered with Tamarac and several Cedar & Tamarac Swamps all unfit for cultivation. The soil is generally level and of second & third rate quality and in many places fit for cultivation. The Township is well timbered and is chiefly Pine Hemlock Sugar and Lim[?]. Chippewa River enters the Township at Section 24 runs a South West course and leaves the Township near the South West corner of Section 35. The River has a swift current & High banks well timbered.

On March 28, 1885, the town was named after President Grover Cleveland.

== Demographics ==
Historical population
Census	Pop.	Note	%±
1990	758		—
2000	900		18.7%
2010	864		−4.0%
2020 (est.)	905		4.7%

As of the census of 2000, there were 900 people, 313 households, and 251 families residing in the town. The population density was 16.6 people per square mile (6.4/km^{2}). There were 339 housing units at an average density of 6.3 per square mile (2.4/km^{2}). The racial makeup of the town was 98.78% White, 0.11% African American, 0.22% Native American, 0.11% Asian, 0.11% from other races, and 0.67% from two or more races. Hispanic or Latino of any race were 0.89% of the population.

There were 313 households, out of which 42.8% had children under the age of 18 living with them, 69.0% were married couples living together, 7.3% had a female householder with no husband present, and 19.8% were non-families. 17.3% of all households were made up of individuals, and 6.1% had someone living alone who was 65 years of age or older. The average household size was 2.88 and the average family size was 3.22.

In the town, the population was spread out, with 30.6% under the age of 18, 6.0% from 18 to 24, 30.7% from 25 to 44, 24.1% from 45 to 64, and 8.7% who were 65 years of age or older. The median age was 35 years. For every 100 females, there were 117.4 males. For every 100 females age 18 and over, there were 109.7 males.

The median income for a household in the town was $33,929, and the median income for a family was $34,345. Males had a median income of $25,625 versus $24,688 for females. The per capita income for the town was $13,796. About 9.0% of families and 10.8% of the population were below the poverty line, including 15.5% of those under age 18 and 2.6% of those age 65 or over.
