= Sampson, Wisconsin =

- Town
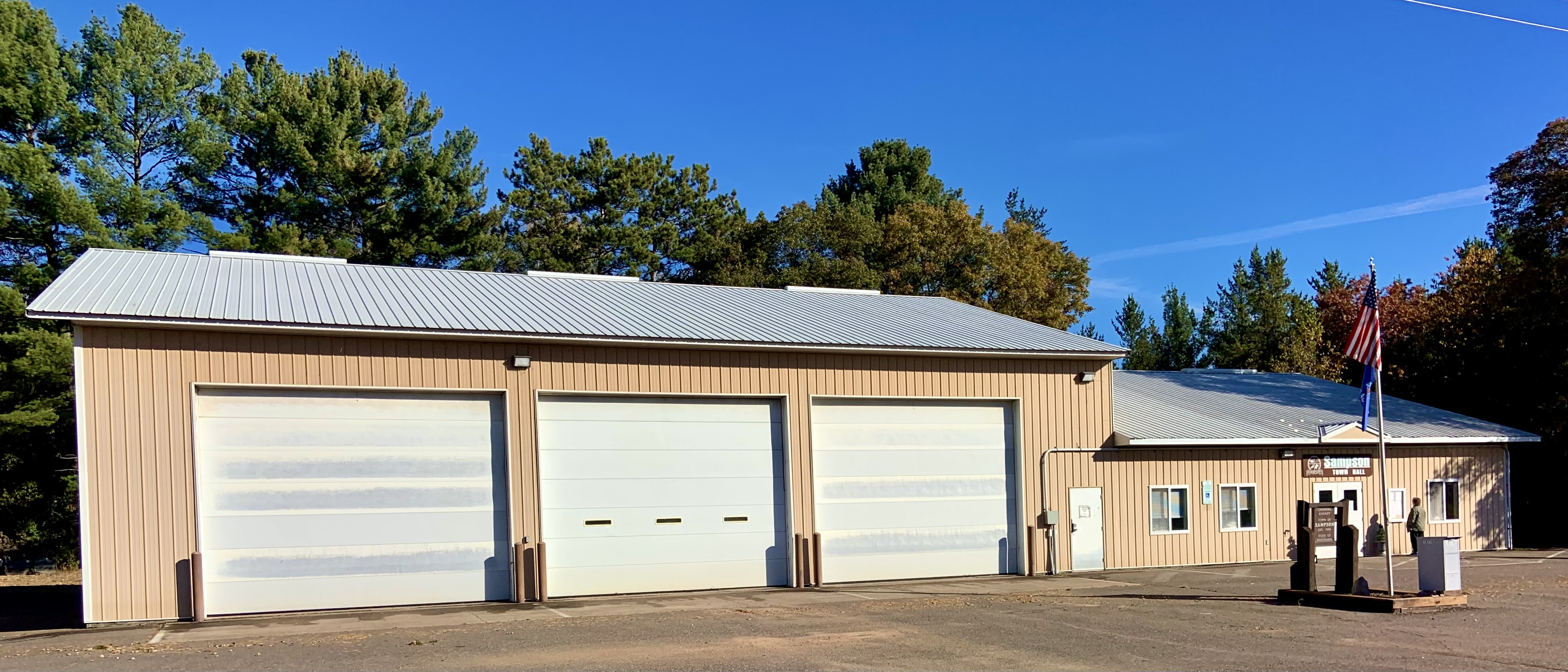
- Town hall

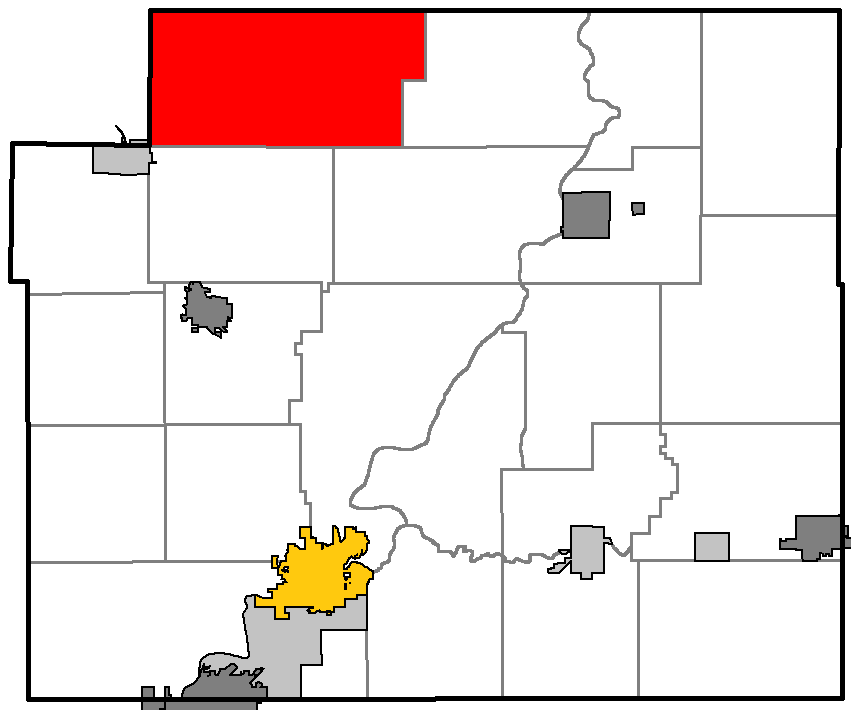
- Location of Sampson within Chippewa County

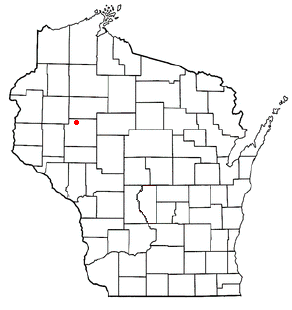
- Location of Sampson, Wisconsin
- Coordinates: 45°15′16″N 91°24′51″W
- Country: United States
- State: Wisconsin
- County: Chippewa

Area
  - Total: 68.1 sq mi (176.5 km^{2})
  - Land: 62.4 sq mi (161.6 km^{2})
  - Water: 5.8 sq mi (14.9 km^{2})
- Elevation: 1,079 ft (329 m)

Population (2020)
  - Total: 972
  - Density: 15.6/sq mi (6.01/km^{2})
- Time zone: UTC-6 (Central (CST))
  - Summer (DST): UTC-5 (CDT)
- Area codes: 715 & 534
- FIPS code: 55-71275
- GNIS feature ID: 1584095
- PLSS township: T32N R9W and most of T32N R8W
- Website: tn.sampson.wi.gov

Sampson is a town in Chippewa County in the U.S. state of Wisconsin. The population was 972 at the 2020 census.

== History ==
The 6-mile (10 km) squares that would become Sampson were first surveyed in June 1852 by a crew working for the U.S. government. That fall other crews marked all the section corners of the six mile squares, walking through the woods and wading the swamps, measuring with chain and compass. When done, the deputy surveyor filed this general description of the western six miles:

This Township contains numerous small ponds many of them have no outlet the bottoms are sand or gravel the water clear and abound in fish, The Lake superior Trail comes in in section 34 with a N.N.W. course passes over a divideing ridge between the waters of Oneals creek and those of Duncans Creek and goes out of sec 6, West of this Trail is a large swamp unfit for cultivation, the largest portion of this Township is well Timbered with Pine & Hard Wood

A different crew surveyed the eastern six miles of the town, describing it thus:

This Township contains a great many Lakes and Swamps one Stream of water on the East Side. The Timber on dry land principally pine some maple and Birch. The Soil Generally is 2d Rate on dry land; in the swamps unfit for Cultivation.

The town is named for Rear Admiral William T. Sampson, a hero of the Spanish–American War.

== Geography ==
The Town of Sampson is roughly a rectangle, 6 miles (10 km) north to south and 12 miles (19 km) east to west. The town occupies the northwestern corner of Chippewa County and is bordered to the north by Rusk County and to the west by Barron County. According to the United States Census Bureau, the town has a total area of 68.1 square miles (176.5 km^{2}), of which 62.4 square miles (161.6 km^{2}) is land and 5.8 square miles (14.9 km^{2}), or 8.42%, is water. The Chippewa Moraine State Recreation Area, part of the Ice Age National Scientific Reserve, is in the southern part of the town.

== Demographics ==
Historical population
Census	Pop.	Note	%±
1990	817		—
2000	816		−0.1%
2010	892		9.3%
2020	972		9.0%

At the 2000 census, there were 816 people, 330 households and 232 families residing in the town. The population density was 13.1 per square mile (5.0/km^{2}). There were 449 housing units at an average density of 7.2 per square mile (2.8/km^{2}). The racial makeup of the town was 99.39% White, 0.12% Asian, and 0.49% from two or more races.

There were 330 households, of which 29.7% had children under the age of 18 living with them, 60.6% were married couples living together, 6.4% had a female householder with no husband present, and 29.4% were non-families. 25.5% of all households were made up of individuals, and 8.8% had someone living alone who was 65 years of age or older. The average household size was 2.47 and the average family size was 2.96.

24.5% of the population were under the age of 18, 7.2% from 18 to 24, 27.0% from 25 to 44, 26.1% from 45 to 64, and 15.2% who were 65 years of age or older. The median age was 40 years. For every 100 females, there were 109.2 males. For every 100 females age 18 and over, there were 109.5 males.

The median household income was $33,021, and the median family income was $38,229. Males had a median income of $28,289 versus $17,500 for females. The per capita income for the town was $14,714. About 10.0% of families and 15.3% of the population were below the poverty line, including 28.6% of those under age 18 and 7.1% of those age 65 or over.
