= Tilden, Wisconsin =

Town of Tilden
- Town
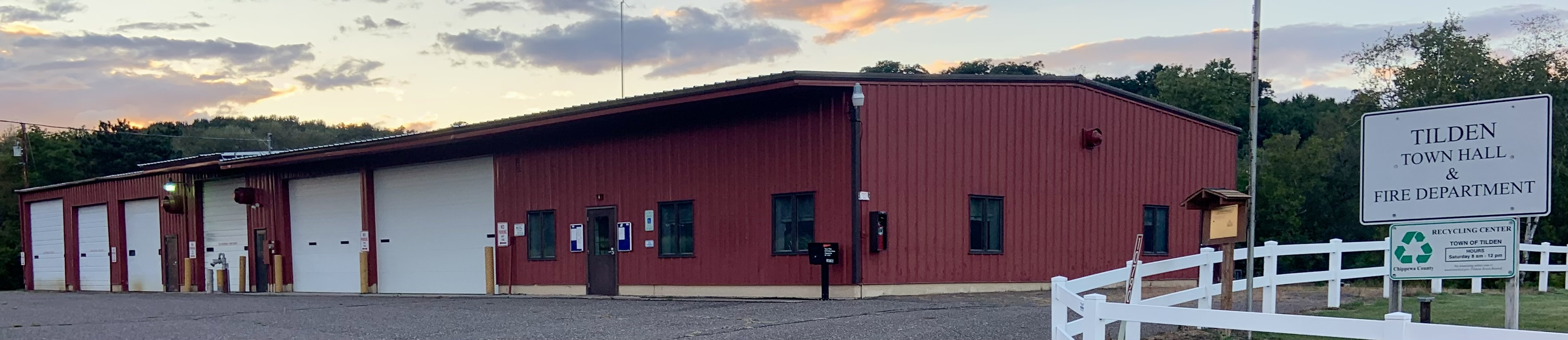
- Town hall

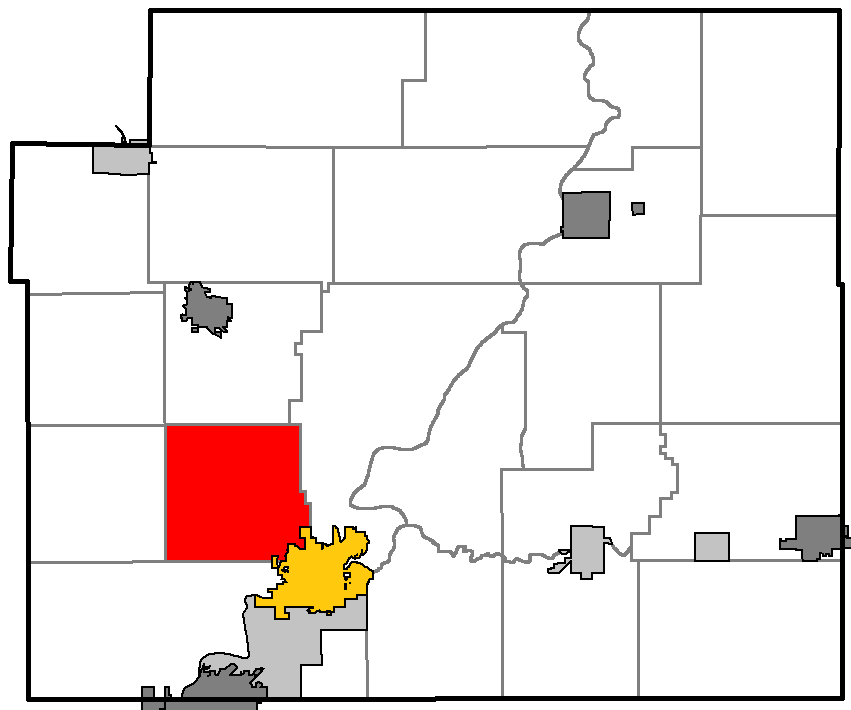
- Location of Tilden within Chippewa County

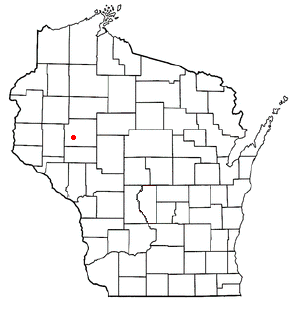
- Location of the Town of Tilden
- Coordinates: 44°59′50″N 91°26′43″W
- Country: United States
- State: Wisconsin
- County: Chippewa

Area
  - Total: 35.9 sq mi (93.0 km^{2})
  - Land: 35.7 sq mi (92.5 km^{2})
  - Water: 0.19 sq mi (0.5 km^{2})
- Elevation: 1,070 ft (326 m)

Population (2020)
  - Total: 1,516
  - Density: 42.4/sq mi (16.4/km^{2})
- Time zone: UTC-6 (Central (CST))
  - Summer (DST): UTC-5 (CDT)
- Area codes: 715 & 534
- FIPS code: 55-79875
- GNIS feature ID: 1584280
- PLSS township: T29N R9W, roughly
- Website: www.townoftilden.gov

The Town of Tilden is located in Chippewa County in the U.S. state of Wisconsin. The population was 1,516 at the 2020 census, up from 1,485 at the 2010 census.

== Geography ==
The town of Tilden is in southwestern Chippewa County and is bordered to the southeast by the city of Chippewa Falls. The town forms roughly a 6 miles (10 km) square. According to the United States Census Bureau, it has a total area of 35.9 square miles (93.0 km^{2}), of which 35.7 square miles (92.5 km^{2}) is land and 0.19 square miles (0.5 km^{2}), or 0.51%, is water.

The town of Tilden is along U.S. Highway 53 as well as County Roads B, Q and S.

== History ==
The outlines of the 6-mile squares that would become most of the Town of Tilden was first surveyed in the fall of 1848 by a crew working for the U.S. government. In September 1849, another crew marked all the section corners, walking through the woods and wading the swamps, measuring with chain and compass. When done, the deputy surveyor filed this general description:

The Surface of this Township is high and rolling: and is mostly covered with Aspen thickets. The prairies(?) are in the ravines and the valleys of the Streams and have a sandy soil.

The Pine in the North Eastern part of the Township along the Stream is small & knotty - not valuable for lumber(?).

John Myers has a farm on the N.E. quarter of Section 22 containing about 7.00(?) Acres(?) and has rais a good crop of Oats Wheat Barley Potatoes and Buckwheat this Season.

The Town of Tilden was formed from part of the Town of Eagle Point in 1882, and named for Samuel J. Tilden, a popular candidate for U.S. President in 1876.

== Demographics ==
Historical population
Census	Pop.	Note	%±
1990	1,079		—
2000	1,185		9.8%
2010	1,485		25.3%
2020	1,516		2.1%

As of the census of 2000, there were 1,185 people, 399 households, and 325 families residing in the town. The population density was 32.9 people per square mile (12.7/km^{2}). There were 413 housing units at an average density of 11.5 per square mile (4.4/km^{2}). The racial makeup of the town was 99.16% White, 0.17% Native American, 0.08% Asian, 0.25% from other races, and 0.34% from two or more races. Hispanic or Latino of any race were 0.76% of the population. No 0.00% Pacific Islanders live in Tilden.

There were 399 households, out of which 38.8% had children under the age of 18 living with them, 73.7% were married couples living together, 3.5% had a female householder with no husband present, and 18.5% were non-families. 15.8% of all households were made up of individuals, and 6.0% had someone living alone who was 65 years of age or older. The average household size was 2.97 and the average family size was 3.32.

The population distribution was 28.9% under the age of 18, 8.8% from 18 to 24, 29.5% from 25 to 44, 23.5% from 45 to 64, and 9.4% who were 65 years of age or older. The median age was 36 years. For every 100 females, there were 110.1 males. For every 100 females age 18 and over, there were 108.1 males.

The median income for a household in the town was $46,477, and the median income for a family was $51,250. Males had a median income of $30,598 versus $24,500 for females. The per capita income for the town was $18,575. About 2.2% of families and 3.2% of the population were below the poverty line, including 2.9% of those under age 18 and 8.9% of those age 65 or over.
