= Cooks Valley, Wisconsin =

- Town
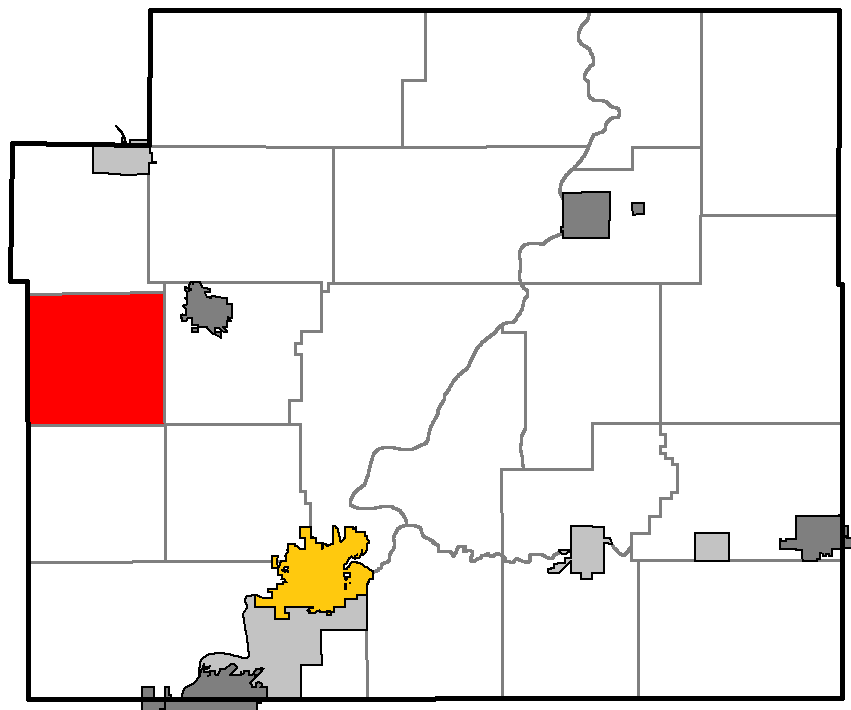
- Location of Cooks Valley within Chippewa County

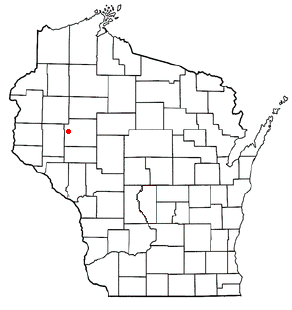
- Location of Cooks Valley, Wisconsin
- Coordinates: 45°4′39″N 91°35′0″W
- Country: United States
- State: Wisconsin
- County: Chippewa

Area
  - Total: 34.31 sq mi (88.86 km^{2})
  - Land: 34.30 sq mi (88.83 km^{2})
  - Water: 0.012 sq mi (0.03 km^{2})
- Elevation: 1,060 ft (323 m)

Population (2020)
  - Total: 757
  - Density: 22.1/sq mi (8.52/km^{2})
- Time zone: UTC-6 (Central (CST))
  - Summer (DST): UTC-5 (CDT)
- Area codes: 715 & 534
- FIPS code: 55-16800
- GNIS feature ID: 1583012

Cooks Valley is a town in Chippewa County in the U.S. state of Wisconsin. The population was 757 at the 2020 census, down from 805 at the 2010 census. The town was named after Jacob Cook, who purchased property in the valley in the summer of 1858. A post office was established in 1870 with William Miller as the first postmaster.

== Geography ==
The town of Cooks Valley is located on the western edge of Chippewa County, bordered to the west by Dunn County. According to the United States Census Bureau, the town has a total area of 34.3 square miles (88.9 km^{2}), of which 0.01 square miles (0.03 km^{2}), or 0.03%, is water.

== Demographics ==
Historical population
| Census | Pop. | Note | %± |
|---|---|---|---|
| 1990 | 594 | | — |
| 2000 | 632 | | 6.4% |
| 2010 | 805 | | 27.4% |
| 2020 | 757 | | −6.0% |

As of the census of 2000, there were 632 people, 214 households, and 169 families residing in the town. The population density was 18.4 people per square mile (7.1/km^{2}). There were 218 housing units at an average density of 6.4 per square mile (2.5/km^{2}). The racial makeup of the town was 99.68% White, 0.16% African American, and 0.16% from two or more races. Hispanic or Latino of any race were 0.79% of the population.

There were 214 households, out of which 41.6% had children under the age of 18 living with them, 72.4% were married couples living together, 2.8% had a female householder with no husband present, and 20.6% were non-families. 14.5% of all households were made up of individuals, and 5.1% had someone living alone who was 65 years of age or older. The average household size was 2.95 and the average family size was 3.31.

In the town, the population was spread out, with 29.3% under the age of 18, 9.2% from 18 to 24, 31.8% from 25 to 44, 21.7% from 45 to 64, and 8.1% who were 65 years of age or older. The median age was 34 years. For every 100 females, there were 113.5 males. For every 100 females age 18 and over, there were 109.9 males.

The median income for a household in the town was $43,523, and the median income for a family was $47,188. Males had a median income of $26,875 versus $23,750 for females. The per capita income for the town was $14,703. About 3.3% of families and 5.2% of the population were below the poverty line, including 5.3% of those under age 18 and 14.8% of those age 65 or over.
