= Birch Creek, Wisconsin =

- Town
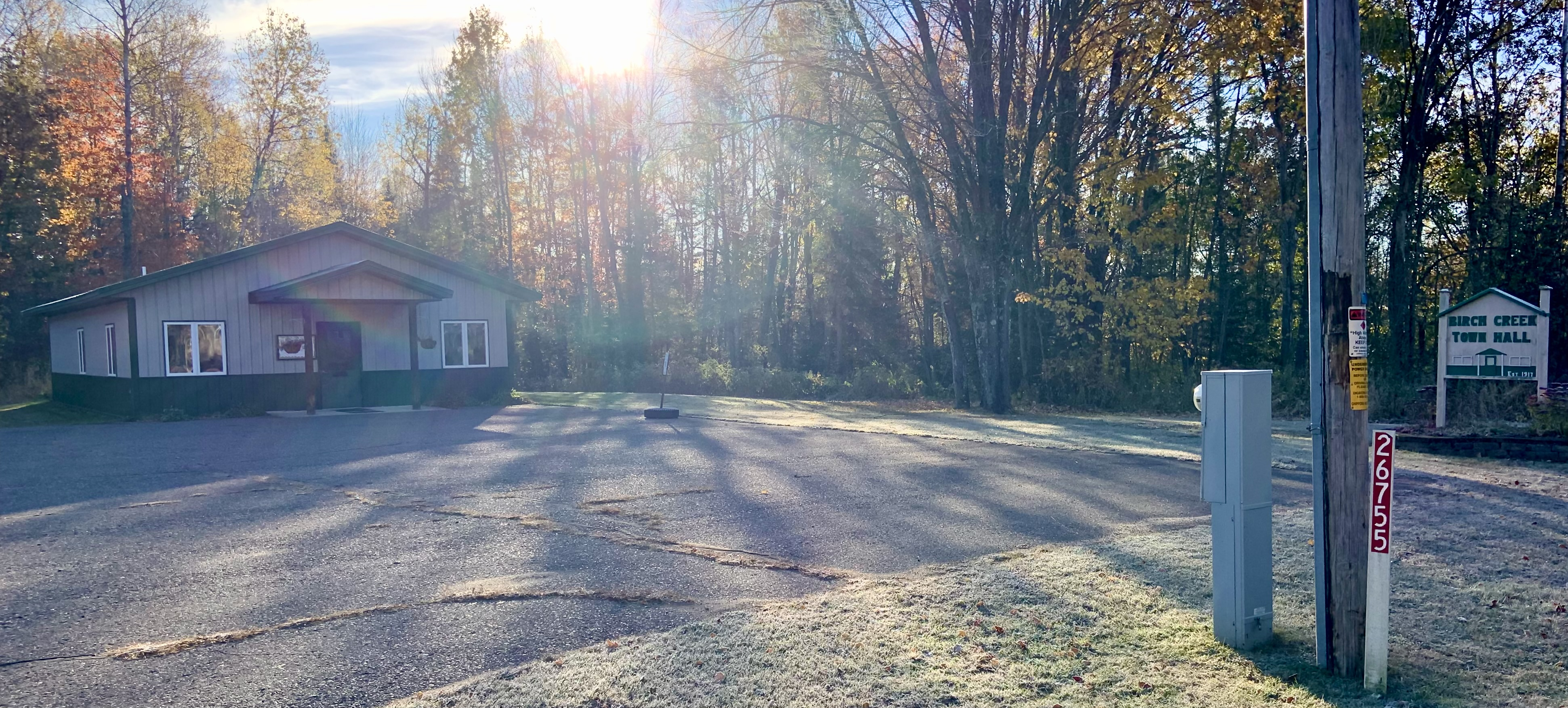
- Town hall

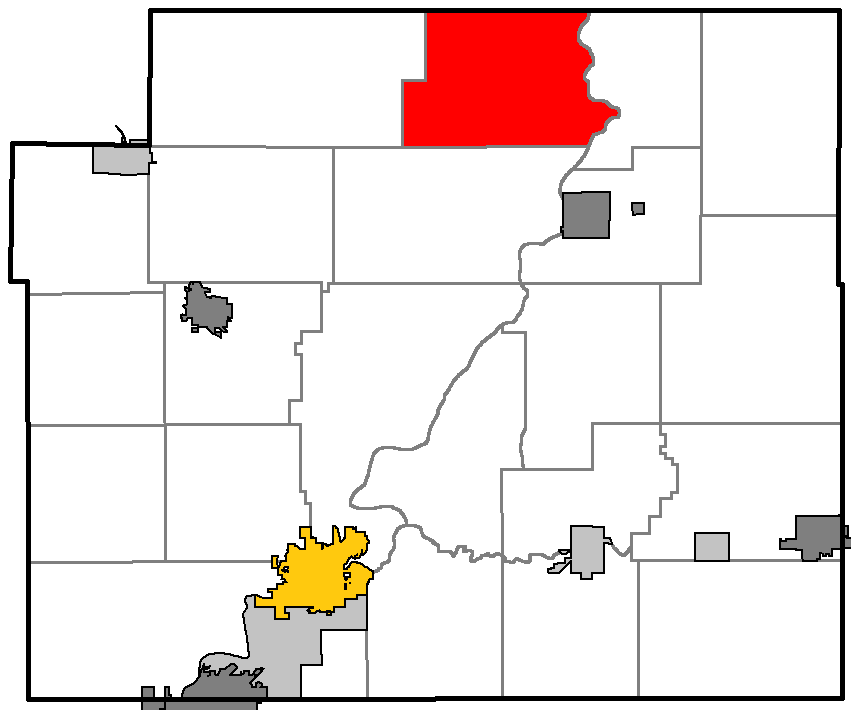
- Location of Birch Creek within Chippewa County

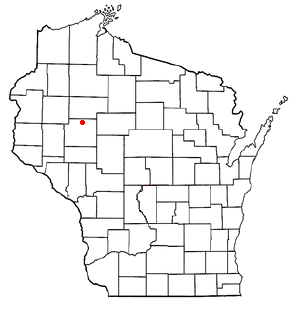
- Location of Birch Creek, Wisconsin
- Coordinates: 45°14′18″N 91°13′17″W
- Country: United States
- State: Wisconsin
- County: Chippewa

Area
  - Total: 46.6 sq mi (120.8 km^{2})
  - Land: 44.5 sq mi (115.3 km^{2})
  - Water: 2.1 sq mi (5.5 km^{2})
- Elevation: 1,194 ft (364 m)

Population (2020)
  - Total: 495
  - Density: 11.1/sq mi (4.29/km^{2})
- Time zone: UTC-6 (Central (CST))
  - Summer (DST): UTC-5 (CDT)
- Area codes: 715 & 534
- FIPS code: 55-07525
- GNIS feature ID: 1582811
- PLSS township: T32N R7W and parts of T32N R6W and T32N R8W
- Website: https://townofbirchcreek.com/

Birch Creek is a town in Chippewa County in the U.S. state of Wisconsin. The population was 495 at the 2020 census.

== Geography ==
Birch Creek is in northern Chippewa County, bordered to the north by Rusk County. The Chippewa River forms the eastern border of the town. According to the United States Census Bureau, the town has a total area of 46.6 square miles (120.8 km^{2}), of which 44.5 square miles (115.3 km^{2}) is land and 2.1 square miles (5.5 km^{2}), or 4.55%, is water.

== History ==
The six-mile squares that would become Lake Holcombe were surveyed in June, 1852 by crews working for the U.S. government. That fall a different crew marked all the section corners, walking through the woods and wading the swamps, measuring with chain and compass. When done, the deputy surveyor filed this general description of the six-miles square in the center of Birch Creek:

The surface of this Township is generally rolling and the uplands fit for cultivation. The timber is chiefly pine Hemlock Cedar & Tamarac. There are several small Swamp all unfit for cultivation. The streams are all small branches. (?) Millery privileges in this Township.

== Demographics ==
Historical population
Census	Pop.	Note	%±
1990	500		—
2000	520		4.0%
2010	517		−0.6%
2020	495		−4.3%

As of the census of 2000, there were 520 people, 212 households, and 157 families residing in the town. The population density was 11.7 people per square mile (4.5/km^{2}). There were 389 housing units at an average density of 8.7 per square mile (3.4/km^{2}). The racial makeup of the town was 98.65% White, and 1.35% from two or more races. Hispanic or Latino of any race were 0.19% of the population.

There were 212 households, out of which 25.9% had children under the age of 18 living with them, 65.6% were married couples living together, 4.7% had a female householder with no husband present, and 25.9% were non-families. 22.6% of all households were made up of individuals, and 9.4% had someone living alone who was 65 years of age or older. The average household size was 2.43 and the average family size was 2.82.

In the town, the population was spread out, with 19.6% under the age of 18, 6.0% from 18 to 24, 24.0% from 25 to 44, 30.8% from 45 to 64, and 19.6% who were 65 years of age or older. The median age was 45 years. For every 100 females, there were 105.5 males. For every 100 females age 18 and over, there were 106.9 males.

The median income for a household in the town was $39,479, and the median income for a family was $43,456. Males had a median income of $35,417 versus $18,750 for females. The per capita income for the town was $17,475. About 5.8% of families and 10.4% of the population were below the poverty line, including 13.8% of those under age 18 and 10.0% of those age 65 or over.
