= Delmar, Wisconsin =

Town of Delmar
- Town
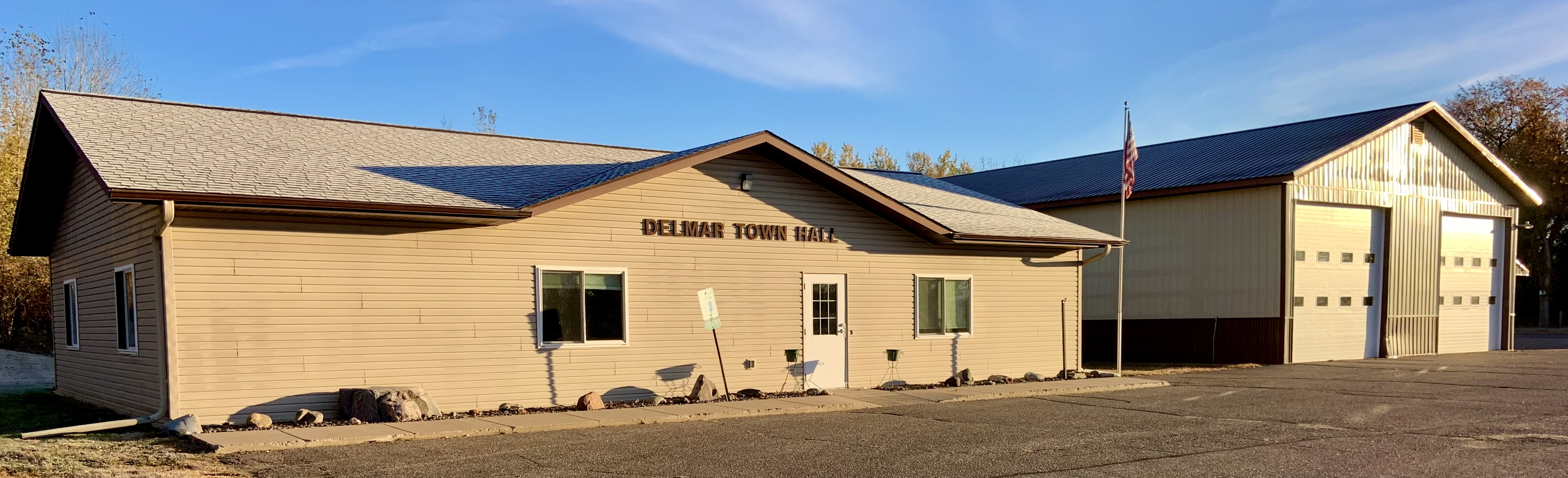
- Town hall

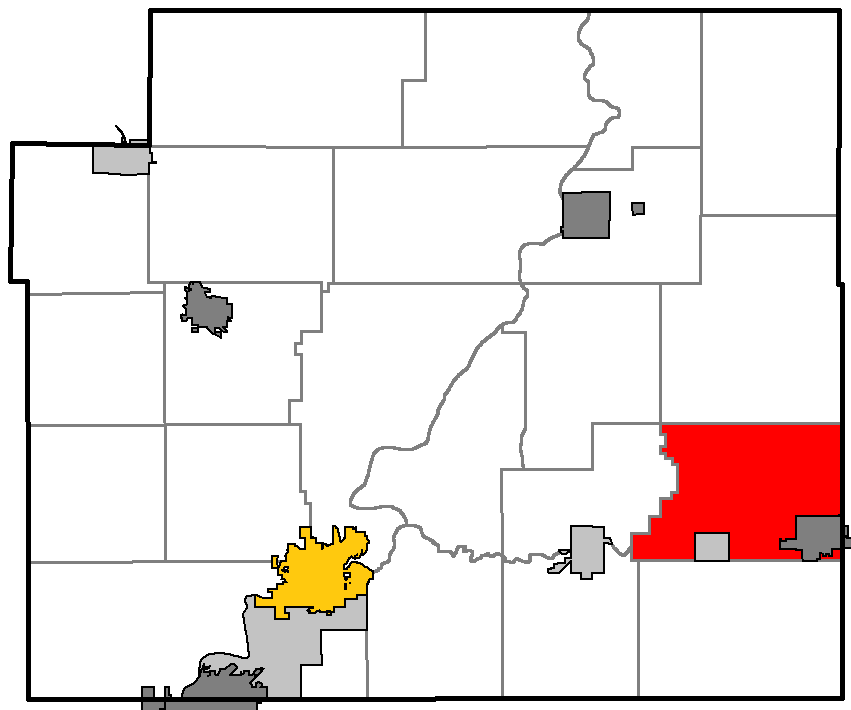
- Location of Delmar within Chippewa County

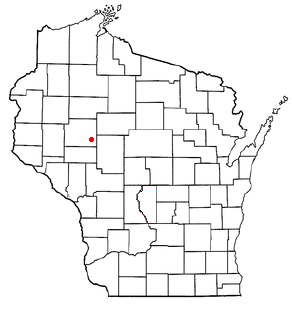
- Location of the Town of Delmar
- Coordinates: 44°58′N 91°0′W
- Country: United States
- State: Wisconsin
- County: Chippewa

Area
  - Total: 42.6 sq mi (110.3 km^{2})
  - Land: 42.4 sq mi (109.8 km^{2})
  - Water: 0.19 sq mi (0.5 km^{2})
- Elevation: 1,132 ft (345 m)

Population (2020)
  - Total: 1,013
  - Density: 23.89/sq mi (9.226/km^{2})
- Time zone: UTC-6 (Central (CST))
  - Summer (DST): UTC-5 (CDT)
- Area codes: 715 & 534
- FIPS code: 55-19625
- GNIS feature ID: 1583072
- PLSS township: T29N R5W and part of T29N R6W

The Town of Delmar is located in Chippewa County in the U.S. state of Wisconsin. The population was 1,013 at the 2020 census.

== History ==
The outlines of the 6-mile squares that would become the Town of Delmar were first surveyed in the fall of 1848 by crews working for the U.S. government. In November 1849 a crew marked all the section lines of the eastern six by six square, walking the woods and swamps on foot, measuring with chain and compass. When done, the deputy surveyor filed this general description of the eastern 6-mile square:

In the Southern part of this Township there is a considerable quantity of valuable Pine timber. In the Southwest quarter of Section 5 there are two unoccupied Cabins. The Surface is generally flat, the Soil poor & wet and but a Small portion adapted to farming. The banks of the Steams are low and the current Swift. Yellow River runs through the North Western Corner of the Township and there is also a considerable stream on the Eastern Part, which affords a good source(?) water power. It is heavily timbered with Birch, Maple, Sugar Pine & Oak.

== Geography ==
The town of Delmar is located in southeastern Chippewa County and measures 6 miles (10 km) north to south and 7 to 9 miles (11 to 14 km) east to west. The town is bordered by Clark County to the east. The village of Boyd is in the southwestern part of the town, and the city of Stanley is in the southeast; both are separate municipalities from the town. The unincorporated community of Maple Hill is located in the town and the unincorporated community of Brownville is located partially in the town. According to the United States Census Bureau, the town of Delmar has a total area of 42.6 square miles (110.3 km^{2}), of which 42.4 square miles (109.8 km^{2}) is land and 0.2 square miles (0.5 km^{2}), or 0.45%, is water.

== Demographics ==
Historical population
Census	Pop.	Note	%±
1990	994		—
2000	941		−5.3%
2010	936		−0.5%
2020	1,013		8.2%

As of the census of 2000, there were 941 people, 314 households, and 252 families residing in the town. The population density was 21.9 people per square mile (8.5/km^{2}). There were 328 housing units at an average density of 7.6 per square mile (3.0/km^{2}). The racial makeup of the town was 98.72% White, 0.11% African American, 0.64% Native American, and 0.53% from two or more races. Hispanic or Latino of any race were 0.11% of the population.

There were 314 households, out of which 39.5% had children under the age of 18 living with them, 70.7% were married couples living together, 3.5% had a female householder with no husband present, and 19.7% were non-families. 16.2% of all households were made up of individuals, and 8.0% had someone living alone who was 65 years of age or older. The average household size was 3.00 and the average family size was 3.39.

The population was 31.9% under the age of 18, 7.1% from 18 to 24, 27.1% from 25 to 44, 22.3% from 45 to 64, and 11.6% who were 65 years of age or older. The median age was 36 years. For every 100 females, there were 106.4 males. For every 100 females age 18 and over, there were 109.5 males.

The median income for a household in the town was $40,278, and the median income for a family was $40,982. Males had a median income of $25,875 versus $19,531 for females. The per capita income for the town was $15,912. About 7.8% of families and 9.1% of the population were below the poverty line, including 7.1% of those under age 18 and 17.8% of those age 65 or over.

== Education ==
The town is served by the School District of Cadott Community and the Stanley-Boyd Area School District.
