= Estella, Wisconsin =

Town of Estella
- Town
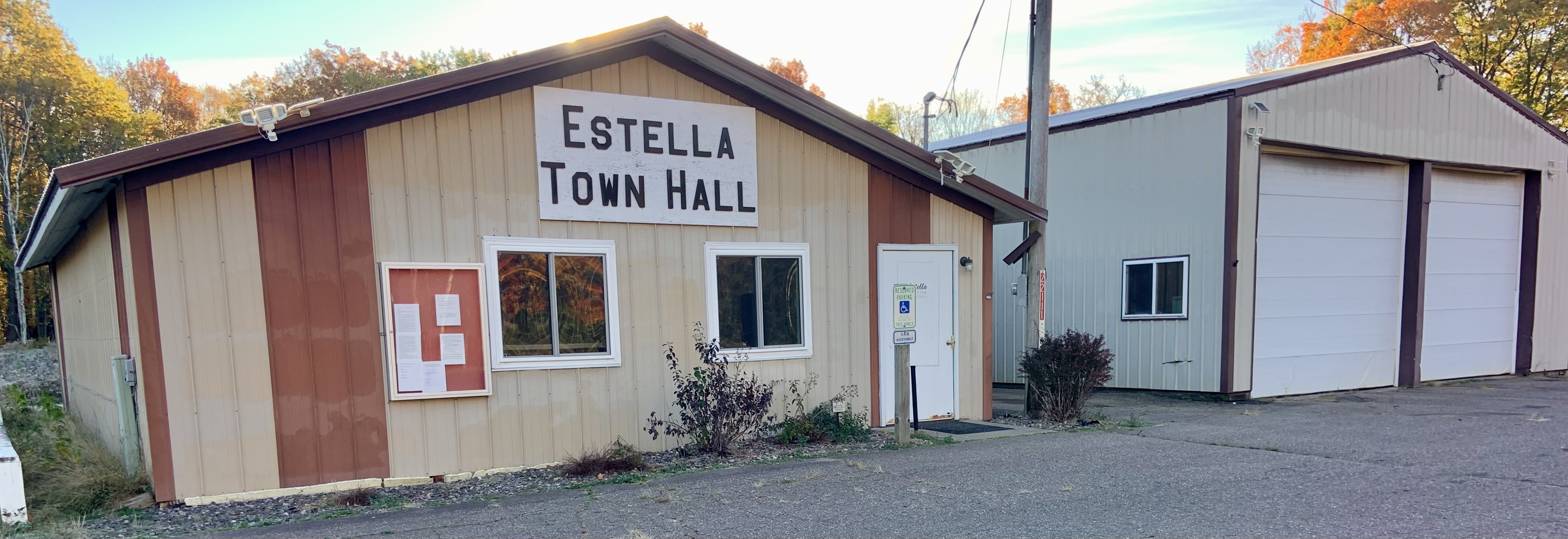
- Town hall

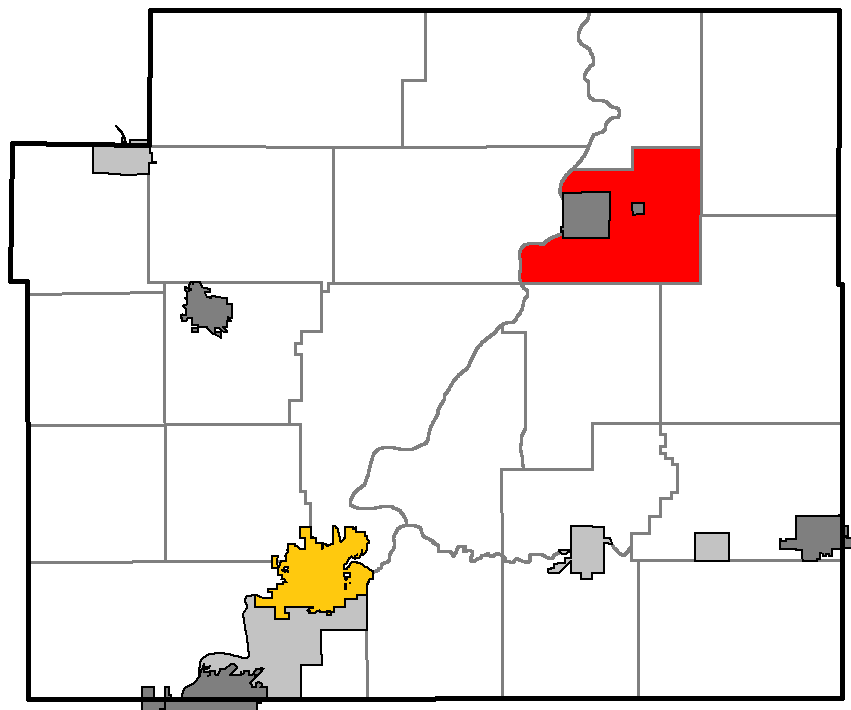
- Location of Estella within Chippewa County

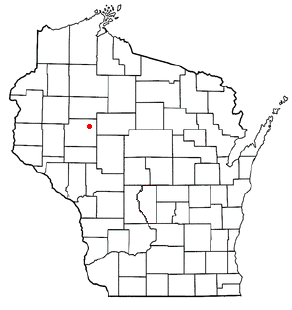
- Location of the Town of Estella
- Coordinates: 45°10′26″N 91°7′16″W
- Country: United States
- State: Wisconsin
- County: Chippewa

Area
  - Total: 32.0 sq mi (82.9 km^{2})
  - Land: 31.4 sq mi (81.4 km^{2})
  - Water: 0.62 sq mi (1.6 km^{2})
- Elevation: 1,152 ft (351 m)

Population (2020)
  - Total: 476
  - Density: 15.1/sq mi (5.85/km^{2})
- Time zone: UTC-6 (Central (CST))
  - Summer (DST): UTC-5 (CDT)
- Area codes: 715 & 534
- FIPS code: 55-24375
- GNIS feature ID: 1583173
- PLSS township: Most of T31N R6W and bits of T31N R7W

The Town of Estella is located in Chippewa County in the U.S. state of Wisconsin. The population was 476 at the 2020 census.

== Geography ==
The shape of Estella is irregular. The east end is a rectangle 6 miles (10 km) north to south and 3 miles (5 km) wide. The west end follows the Chippewa River, except for a section which is part of the city of Cornell.

According to the United States Census Bureau, the town has a total area of 32.0 square miles (82.9 km^{2}), of which 31.4 square miles (81.4 km^{2}) is land and 0.62 square miles (1.6 km^{2}), or 1.89%, is water.

== History ==
The six-mile blocks that would become Estella were first surveyed in 1847 by a crew working for the U.S. government. In 1852 a different crew marked all the section corners of the township, walking through the woods and wading the rivers, measuring with chain and compass. When done, the deputy surveyor filed this general description of the six by six mile square which overlays most of the modern township:

This Township contains a number of Cedar & Tamarac swamp, all unfit for cultivation. The Surface generally level(?) and heavily(?) timbered with Pine, Hemlock, Tamarac Sugar Maple & Birch. Soil second to third rate and a part fit for cultivation. Chippewa and Fisher Rivers runs through the NorthWest corner of this Township. The banks of this River are high and generally covered with pine and Hemlock timber.

The town was named for Laura Estella Flint, the wife of Warren S. Flint, a local business owner who became the first postmaster in 1886.

== Demographics ==
Historical population
Census	Pop.	Note	%±
1990	449		—
2000	469		4.5%
2010	433		−7.7%
2020	476		9.9%
2023 (est.)	514		8.0%

=== 2020 census ===
As of the 2020 United States census, there were 476 people and 176 households residing in the town. The racial makeup of the town was 97.69% White and 3.26% from two or more races.

There were 176 households, out of which 30.1% had children under the age of 18 living with them and 59.7% were married couples living together. 18.0% of all households were made up of individuals, and 33.0% had someone living alone who was 65 years of age or older.

The median income for a household in the town was $70,938.

=== 2000 census ===
As of the 2000 United States census of 2000, there were 469 people, 167 households, and 131 families residing in the town. The population density was 14.9 people per square mile (5.7/km^{2}). There were 190 housing units at an average density of 6.0 per square mile (2.3/km^{2}). The racial makeup of the town was 98.93% White, 0.43% Native American, 0.43% Asian, and 0.21% from two or more races.

There were 167 households, out of which 37.7% had children under the age of 18 living with them, 69.5% were married couples living together, 4.8% had a female householder with no husband present, and 21.0% were non-families. 18.0% of all households were made up of individuals, and 8.4% had someone living alone who was 65 years of age or older. The average household size was 2.81 and the average family size was 3.14.

The population was 27.9% under the age of 18, 6.8% from 18 to 24, 27.5% from 25 to 44, 27.9% from 45 to 64, and 9.8% who were 65 years of age or older. The median age was 36 years. For every 100 females, there were 103.9 males. For every 100 females age 18 and over, there were 112.6 males.

The median income for a household in the town was $38,250, and the median income for a family was $42,222. Males had a median income of $28,558 versus $19,667 for females. The per capita income for the town was $14,237. About 4.6% of families and 7.1% of the population were below the poverty line, including 1.5% of those under age 18 and 5.4% of those age 65 or over.

== Other Estella ==
There are other two inhabited places with the name Estella in the world:

- Estella (Navarre, Spain), the original one.
- Estella (New South Wales, Australia).
