= Auburn, Chippewa County, Wisconsin =

Auburn, Wisconsin
- Town
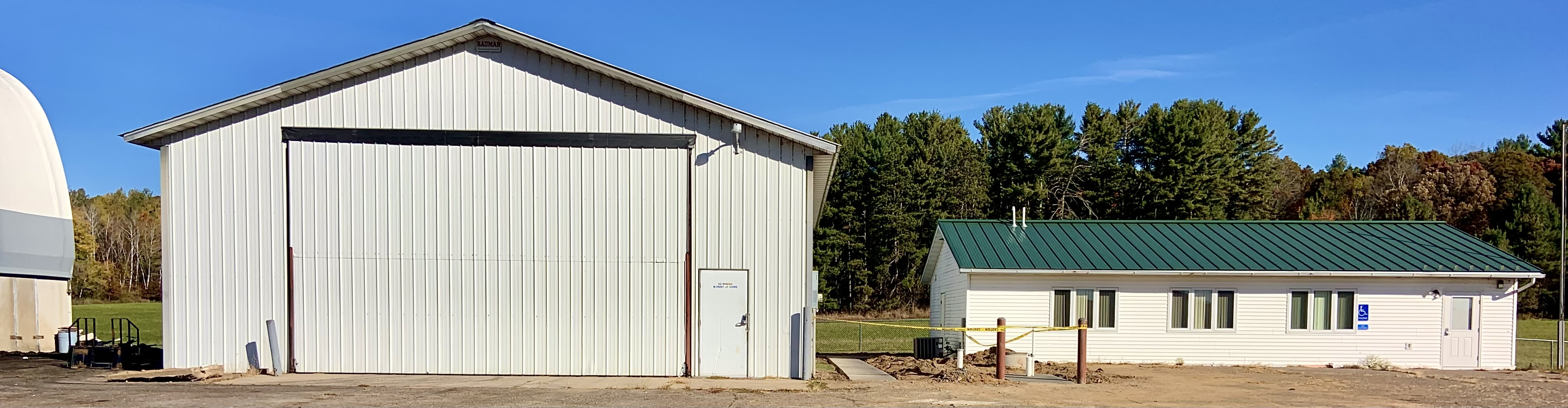
- Town hall

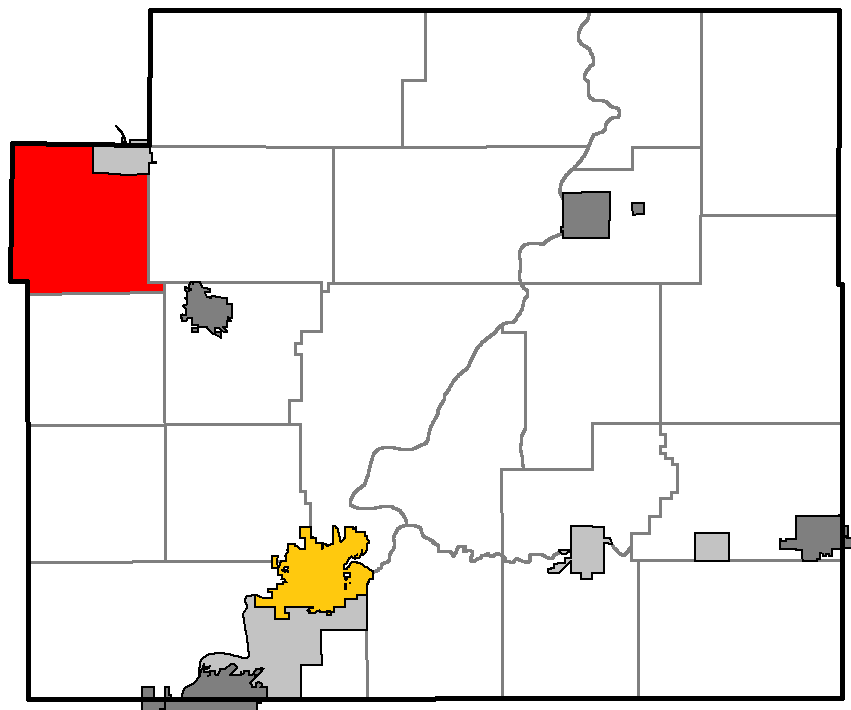
- Location of Auburn, within Chippewa County, Wisconsin

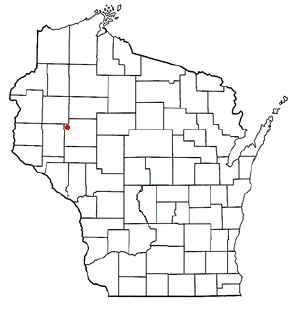
- Location of Auburn, Wisconsin
- Coordinates: 45°9′54″N 91°37′8″W
- Country: United States
- State: Wisconsin
- County: Chippewa

Area
  - Total: 35.7 sq mi (92.4 km^{2})
  - Land: 35.7 sq mi (92.4 km^{2})
  - Water: 0 sq mi (0.0 km^{2})
- Elevation: 1,152 ft (351 m)

Population (2020)
  - Total: 776
  - Density: 21.8/sq mi (8.40/km^{2})
- Time zone: UTC-6 (Central (CST))
  - Summer (DST): UTC-5 (CDT)
- Area codes: 715 & 534
- FIPS code: 55-03725
- GNIS feature ID: 1582729
- Website: townofauburn.net

Auburn is a town in Chippewa County in the U.S. state of Wisconsin. The population was 776 at the 2020 census, up from 697 at the 2010 census.

== History ==
The town was named from a place called Auburn, mentioned in the poem "The Deserted Village" by Oliver Goldsmith.

== Geography ==
The Town of Auburn is in northwestern Chippewa County and is bordered by Barron County to the north and Dunn County to the west. The village of New Auburn borders the northeastern corner of the town. According to the United States Census Bureau, the town has a total area of 35.7 square miles (92.4 km^{2}), all land.

== Demographics ==
Historical population
Census	Pop.	Note	%±
1990	474		—
2000	580		22.4%
2010	697		20.2%
2020	776		11.3%

As of the census of 2000, there were 580 people, 202 households, and 163 families residing in the town. The population density was 16.2 people per square mile (6.3/km^{2}). There were 210 housing units at an average density of 5.9 per square mile (2.3/km^{2}). The racial makeup of the town was 98.45% White, 0.17% Native American, 0.17% from other races, and 1.21% from two or more races. Hispanic or Latino of any race were 0.17% of the population.

There were 202 households, out of which 33.7% had children under the age of 18 living with them, 73.8% were married couples living together, 3.5% had a female householder with no husband present, and 19.3% were non-families. 13.9% of all households were made up of individuals, and 5.0% had someone living alone who was 65 years of age or older. The average household size was 2.87 and the average family size was 3.19.

In the town, the population was spread out, with 27.2% under the age of 18, 8.4% from 18 to 24, 31.9% from 25 to 44, 22.6% from 45 to 64, and 9.8% who were 65 years of age or older. The median age was 34 years. For every 100 females, there were 112.5 males. For every 100 females age 18 and over, there were 112.1 males.

The median income for a household in the town was $36,000, and the median income for a family was $39,444. Males had a median income of $24,167 versus $19,063 for females. The per capita income for the town was $17,164. About 3.7% of families and 8.2% of the population were below the poverty line, including 11.9% of those under age 18 and 11.0% of those age 65 or over.

== Notable people ==
- John E. Prince, Wisconsin State Representative, farmer, and resort owner, was born in the town
