= Wisconsin's 68th Assembly district =

American legislative district in northwest Wisconsin

Wisconsin's 68th State Assembly district
- 2024 map defined in 2023 Wisc. Act 94; 2022 map defined in Johnson v. Wisconsin Elections Commission; 2011 map was defined in 2011 Wisc. Act 43
Assemblymember
Rob Summerfield; R–Bloomer
since January 6, 2025 (1 years)
- Demographics: 95.34% White; 0.36% Black; 1.16% Hispanic; 0.6% Asian; 1.46% Native American; 0.22% Hawaiian/Pacific Islander
- Population (2020) • Voting age: 59,902; 47,350
- Website: Official website
- Notes: Northwest Wisconsin

The 68th Assembly district of Wisconsin is one of 99 districts in the Wisconsin State Assembly. Located in northwestern Wisconsin, the district comprises all of Price and Rusk counties, and most of Chippewa and Taylor counties. It includes the cities of Bloomer, Cornell, Ladysmith, Park Falls, and Phillips, and the villages of Bruce, Catawba, Conrath, Gilman, Glen Flora, Hawkins, Ingram, Kennan, Lublin, Prentice, Rib Lake, Sheldon, Tony, and Weyerhaeuser. The district also contains Lake Wissota State Park, Brunet Island State Park, and Timms Hill—the highest natural point in the state of Wisconsin. The district is represented by Republican Rob Summerfield, since January 2025; Summerfield previously represented the 67th district from 2017 to 2025.

The 68th Assembly district is located within Wisconsin's 23rd Senate district, along with the 67th and 69th Assembly districts.

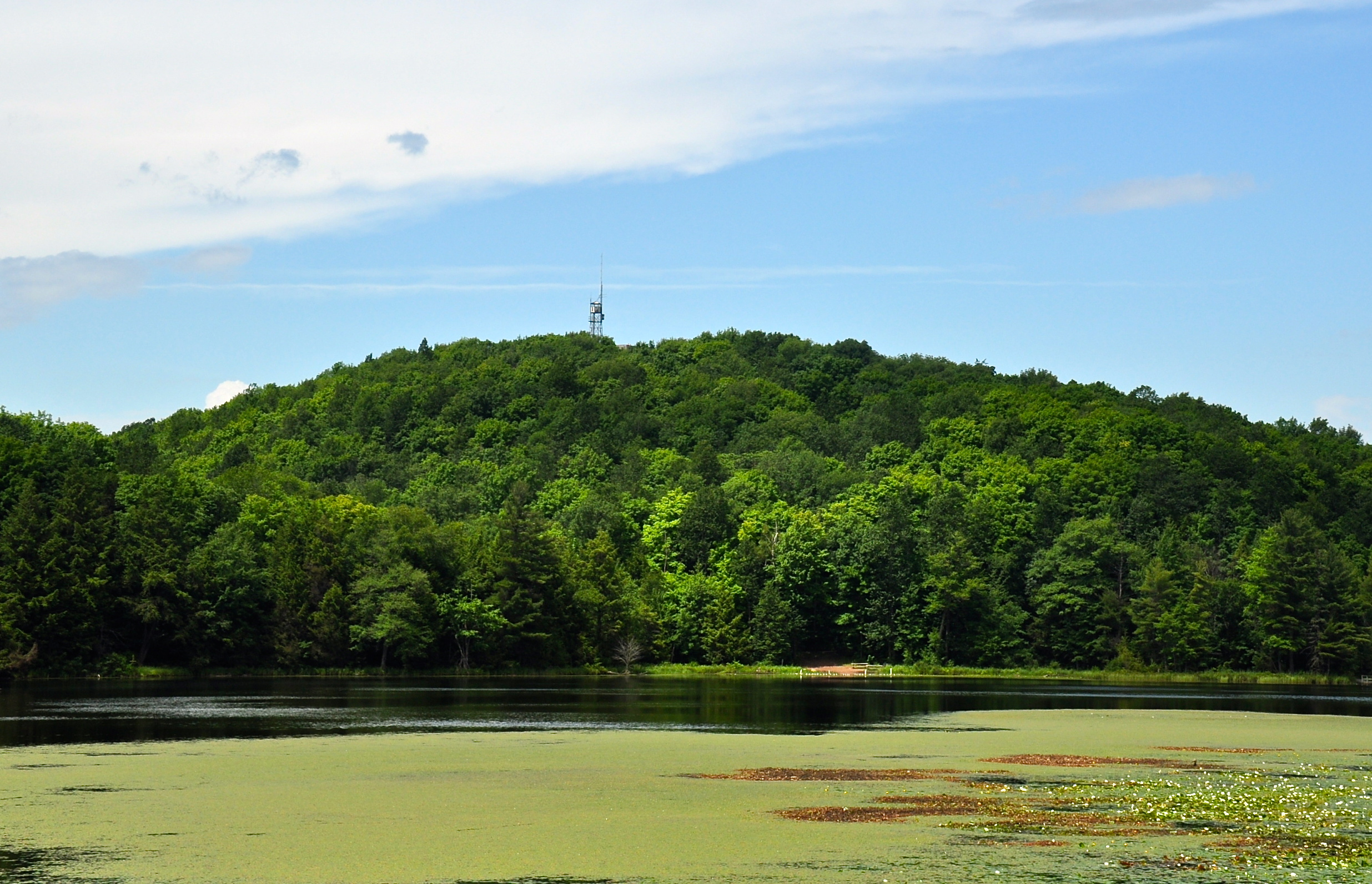
Timms Hill

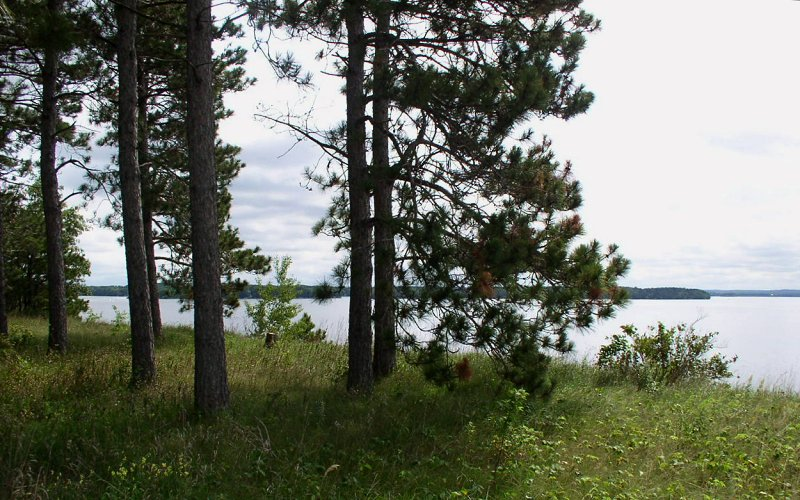
Lake Wissota State Park

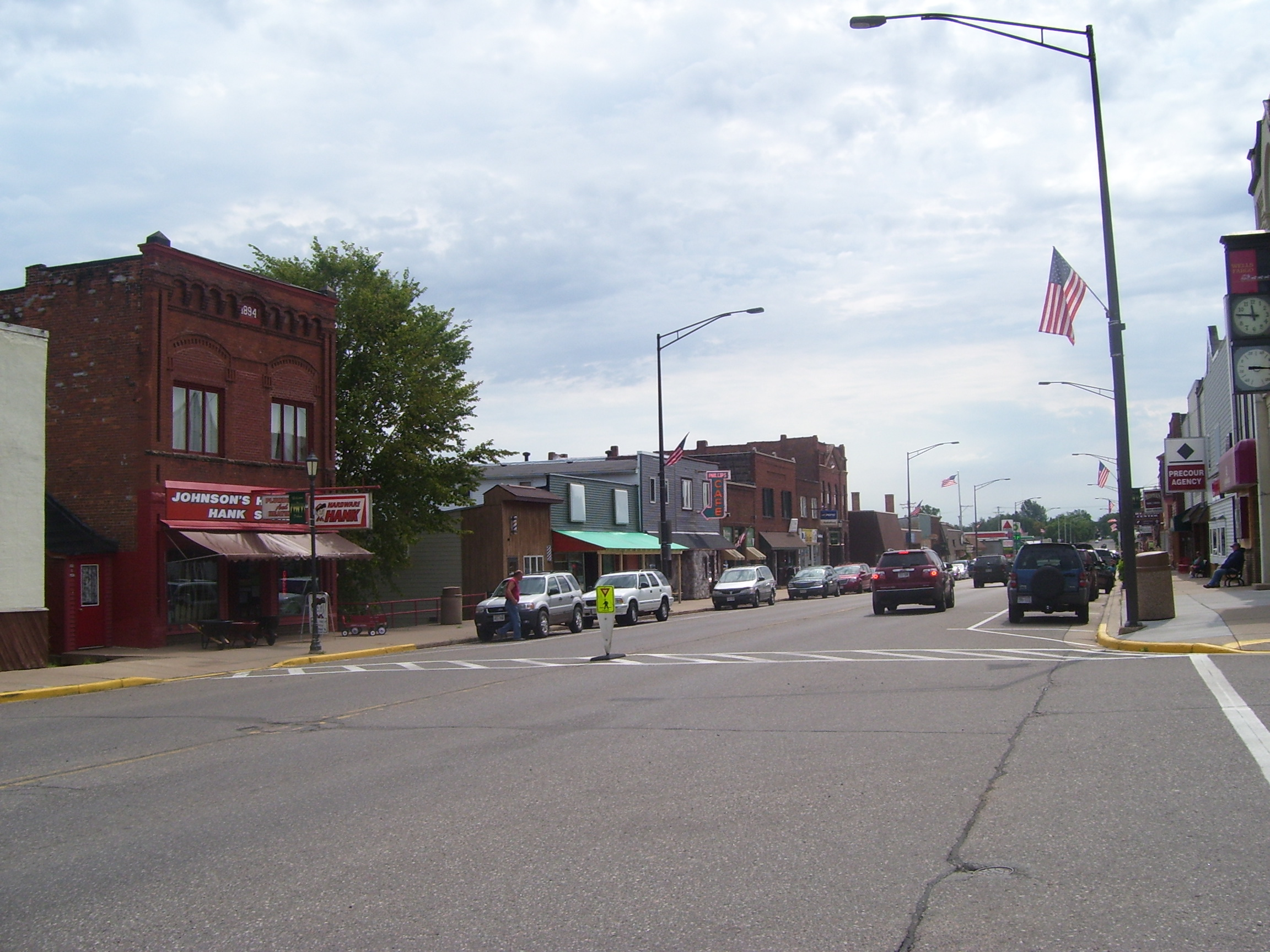
Phillips, Wisconsin

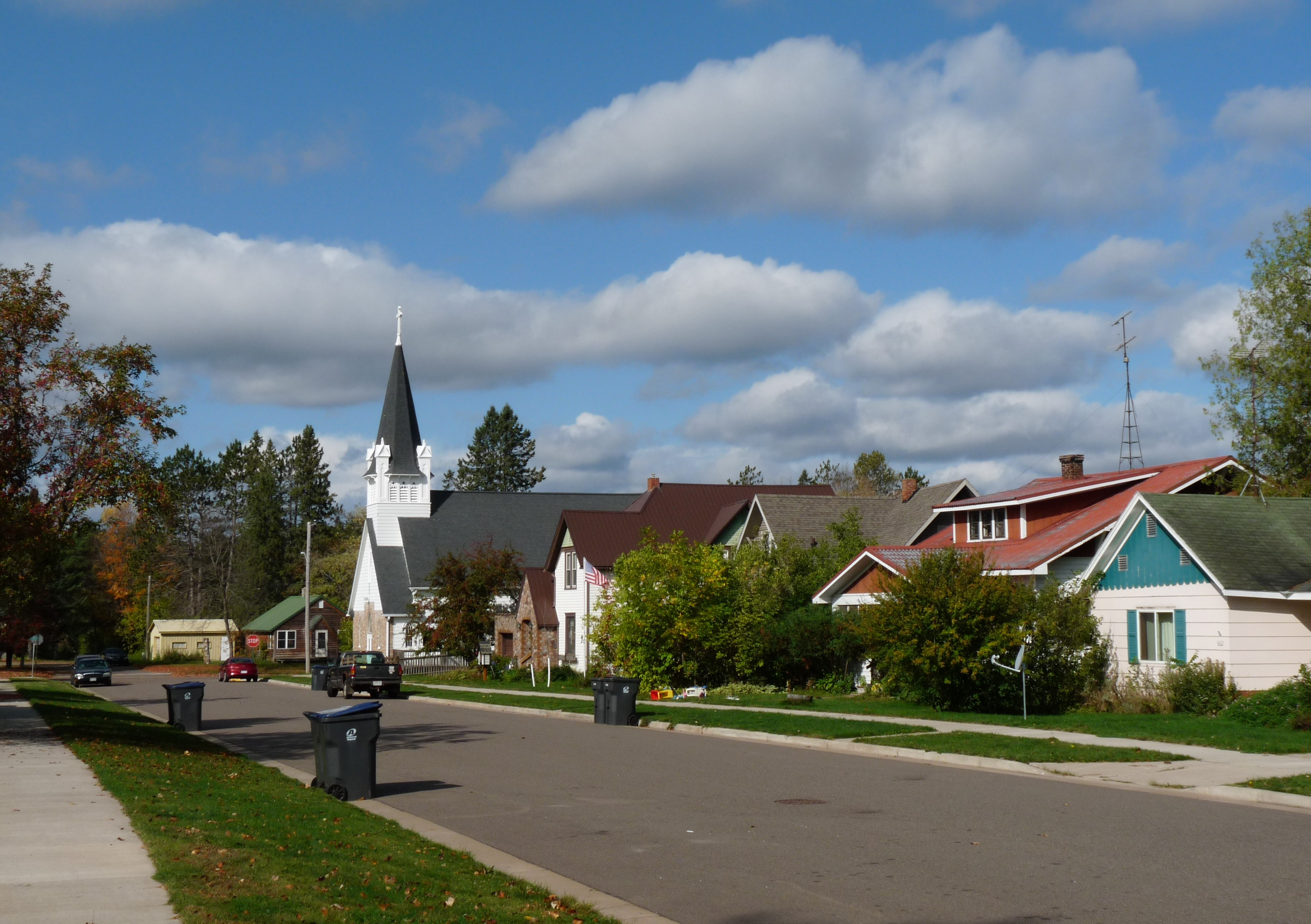
Prentice, Wisconsin

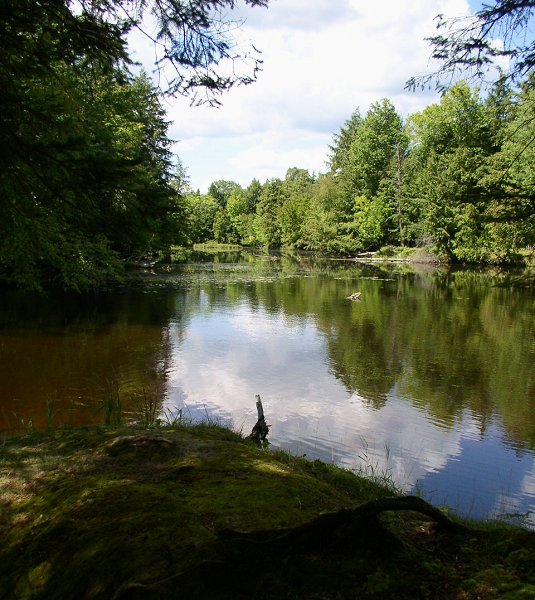
Brunet Island State Park

== History ==
The district was created in the 1972 redistricting act (1971 Wisc. Act 304) which first established the numbered district system, replacing the previous system which allocated districts to specific counties. The 68th district was drawn mostly in line with the former Eau Claire County 1st district (most of the city of Eau Claire), but added all of the remaining precincts of the city of Eau Claire. The last representative of the Eau Claire County 1st district, Joseph Looby, went on to win the first election to represent the 68th Assembly district.

The district boundaries have shifted over the various redistricting schemes since 1983, though the district had remained anchored on the city of Eau Claire until the controversial 2011 redistricting plan (2011 Wisc. Act 43) which divided the city between the 68th and 91st Assembly districts, and added vast stretches of Clark County and parts of Jackson and Trempealeau counties to the 68th district. Under the 2022 court-ordered redistricting, barely any of the city of Eau Claire remains in this district. The 2024 redistricting completely removed the district from Eau Claire County, shifting it north to rural Chippewa, Rusk, Price, and Taylor counties.

== List of past representatives ==
List of representatives to the Wisconsin State Assembly from the 68th district
Member	Party	Residence	Counties represented	Term start	Term end	Ref.
District created
Joseph Looby	Dem.	Eau Claire	Chippewa, Eau Claire	January 1, 1973	January 1, 1979	
William P. Gagin	Rep.	Eau Claire	Chippewa, Eau Claire	January 1, 1979	January 5, 1981	
Joseph Looby	Dem.	Eau Claire	Chippewa, Eau Claire	January 5, 1981	January 3, 1983	
John M. Young	Rep.	Brookfield	Milwaukee, Waukesha	January 3, 1983	January 7, 1985	
Joseph Looby	Dem.	Eau Claire	Chippewa, Eau Claire, Taylor	January 7, 1985	January 2, 1989	
David Zien	Rep.	Eau Claire	Chippewa, Eau Claire, Taylor	January 2, 1989	April 12, 1993	
--Vacant--			Chippewa, Eau Claire	April 12, 1993	July 9, 1993	
David Plombon	Dem.	Stanley	Chippewa, Eau Claire	July 9, 1993	January 6, 1997	
Chuck Schafer	Rep.	Lafayette	Chippewa, Eau Claire	January 6, 1997	January 4, 1999	
Larry Balow	Dem.	Eau Claire	Chippewa, Eau Claire	January 4, 1999	January 3, 2005	
Terry Moulton	Rep.	Chippewa Falls	Chippewa, Eau Claire	January 3, 2005	January 5, 2009	
Kristen Dexter	Dem.	Eau Claire	Chippewa, Eau Claire	January 5, 2009	January 3, 2011	
Kathy Bernier	Rep.	Chippewa Falls	Chippewa, Clark, Eau Claire, Jackson, Trempealeau	January 3, 2011	January 7, 2019	
Jesse L. James	Rep.	Altoona	Chippewa, Clark, Eau Claire, Jackson, Trempealeau	January 7, 2019	January 2, 2023	
Karen Hurd	Rep.	Fall Creek	Chippewa, Clark, Eau Claire	January 3, 2023	January 6, 2025	
Rob Summerfield	Rep.	Bloomer	Chippewa, Price, Rusk, Taylor	January 6, 2025	Current	

== Electoral history ==
Year	Date	Elected				Defeated				Total	Plurality	Other primary candidates
1972	Nov. 7	Joseph Looby	Democratic	12,599	59.07%	David Duax	Rep.	8,730	40.93%	21,329	3,869	
1974	Nov. 5	Joseph Looby (inc.)	Democratic	9,507	90.00%	Joseph L. Larson	Amer.	1,056	10.00%	10,563	8,451	
1976	Nov. 2	Joseph Looby (inc.)	Democratic	13,263	61.14%	Gerald R. Ritsch	Rep.	8,430	38.86%	21,693	4,833	Roger C. Wold (Dem.); Anthony J. LaChappelle (Rep.); Joseph L. Larson (Rep.)
1978	Nov. 7	William P. Gagin	Republican	7,382	50.10%	Joseph Looby (inc.)	Dem.	7,353	49.90%	14,735	29	
1980	Nov. 4	Joseph Looby	Democratic	13,398	57.20%	William P. Gagin (inc.)	Rep.	10,025	42.80%	23,423	3,373	Mark D. Lewis (Dem.); Martin A. Grindeland (Dem.)
1982	Nov. 2	John M. Young	Republican	11,210	100.00%					11,210	11,210	Jerome P. Delfeld (Rep.)
1984	Nov. 6	Joseph Looby	Democratic	12,878	63.14%	Allan G. Brown	Rep.	7,518	36.86%	20,396	5,360	
1986	Nov. 4	Joseph Looby (inc.)	Democratic	7,470	50.82%	David A. Zien	Rep.	7,228	49.18%	14,698	242	Norman Gillette (Rep.)
1988	Nov. 8	David A. Zien	Republican	11,093	52.65%	Joseph Looby (inc.)	Dem.	9,978	47.35%	21,071	1,115	Douglas A. Kranig (Rep.)
1990	Nov. 6	David A. Zien (inc.)	Republican	8,337	52.92%	Colleen A. Bates	Dem.	7,416	47.08%	15,753	921	
1992	Nov. 3	David A. Zien (inc.)	Republican	13,466	53.40%	Colleen A. Bates	Dem.	11,752	46.60%	25,218	1,714	Richard Postlewaite (Dem.)
1993	June 29	David Plombon	Democratic	4,161	51.05%	Wayne E. Laufenberg	Rep.	3,990	48.95%	8,151	171	Louis P. Hebert Jr. (Dem.); Howard J. Ludwigson (Rep.); Fred S. Poquette (Rep.); Charles G. Barlow (Rep.); Maynard Hopkins (Rep.); Paul M. Pettis (Rep.)
1994	Nov. 8	David Plombon (inc.)	Democratic	7,750	50.12%	Wayne E. Laufenberg	Rep.	7,217	46.67%	15,464	533	Darold E. Wall (Dem.); Frank Lach (Dem.); Kevin J. Dickinson (Rep.)
1994	Nov. 8	David Plombon (inc.)	Democratic	7,750	50.12%	Mark S. Lawrence	Ind.	497	3.21%	15,464	533	Darold E. Wall (Dem.); Frank Lach (Dem.); Kevin J. Dickinson (Rep.)
1996	Nov. 5	Chuck Schafer	Republican	11,010	53.01%	David Plombon (inc.)	Dem.	9,758	46.99%	20,768	1,252	Steve Kaste (Dem.); Jeffrey Wood (Rep.); Violet M. Dawes (Rep.)
1998	Nov. 3	Larry Balow	Democratic	8,210	51.42%	Chuck Schafer (inc.)	Rep.	7,758	48.58%	15,968	452	
2000	Nov. 7	Larry Balow (inc.)	Democratic	12,909	53.47%	Howard J. Ludwigson	Rep.	11,205	46.41%	24,143	1,704	Violet M. Dawes (Rep.)
2002	Nov. 5	Larry Balow (inc.)	Democratic	9,341	51.27%	Terry Moulton	Rep.	8,858	48.62%	18,218	483	
2004	Nov. 2	Terry Moulton	Republican	16,665	54.09%	Joe Bee Xiong	Dem.	14,094	45.74%	30,810	2,571	
2006	Nov. 7	Terry Moulton (inc.)	Republican	11,143	51.24%	Michael A. Turner	Dem.	10,594	48.71%	21,747	549	
2008	Nov. 4	Kristen Dexter	Democratic	15,437	50.35%	Terry Moulton (inc.)	Rep.	15,165	49.47%	30,657	272	
2010	Nov. 2	Kathy Bernier	Republican	10,765	50.15%	Kristen Dexter (inc.)	Dem.	10,673	49.73%	21,464	92	
2012	Nov. 6	Kathy Bernier (inc.)	Republican	13,758	52.39%	Judy Smriga	Dem.	12,482	47.53%	26,263	1,276	
2014	Nov. 4	Kathy Bernier (inc.)	Republican	11,289	52.82%	Jeff Peck	Dem.	10,076	47.15%	21,371	1,213	
2016	Nov. 8	Kathy Bernier (inc.)	Republican	15,628	58.05%	Howard White	Dem.	11,263	41.83%	26,923	4,365	
2018	Nov. 6	Jesse L. James	Republican	14,129	57.59%	Wendy Sue Johnson	Dem.	10,394	42.37%	24,533	3,735	
2020	Nov. 3	Jesse L. James (inc.)	Republican	18,993	60.95%	Emily Berge	Dem.	12,162	39.03%	31,162	6,831	
2022	Nov. 8	Karen Hurd	Republican	14,338	60.68%	Nate Otto	Dem.	9,273	39.25%	23,627	5,065	Hillarie Roth (Rep.); Chris Connell (Rep.)
