= Cornell School District =

There are two school districts in the United States by the name of Cornell School District:

- Cornell School District (Allegheny County, Pennsylvania)
- Cornell School District (Cornell, Wisconsin)
