= David Zien =

American politician

Dave Zien
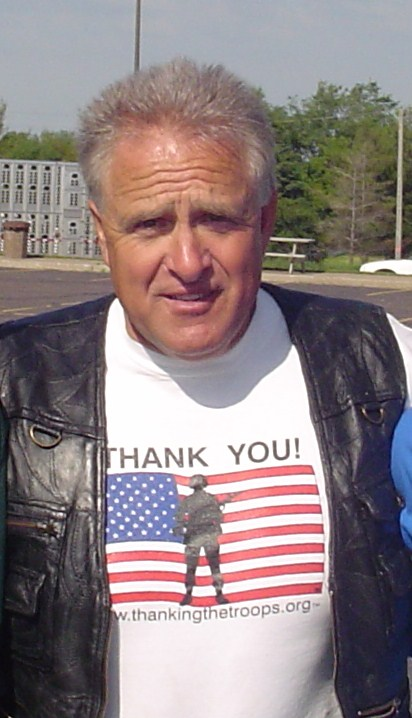

Member of the Wisconsin Senate from the 23rd district
- In office 1993 – January 3, 2007
- Preceded by: Marvin J. Roshell
- Succeeded by: Pat Kreitlow

Personal details
- Born: Chippewa Falls
- Education: University of Wisconsin-Eau Claire; University of Wisconsin - Stout
- Occupation: Politician

David Allen Zien (born March 15, 1950) is an American politician who represented Wisconsin's 23rd Senate district as a Republican member of the Wisconsin State Senate.

== Early life, education and political career ==
Zien was born in Chippewa Falls, Wisconsin and attended Cadott High School. He has a B.S. from University of Wisconsin–Eau Claire and an M.S. from University of Wisconsin–Stout. Prior to holding elected office, Zien was a campus administrator at Northcentral Technical College. Zien was elected to the Wisconsin State Assembly in 1988 and to the Wisconsin Senate in 1993 in a special election. He became the President pro tempore in 2005. He was defeated in his Fall 2006 re-election campaign by Democrat Pat Kreitlow.

=== Military service ===
Zein joined the United States Marines and served with Lima Company, 3rd Battalion, 4th Marine Regiment in the Vietnam War in 1969. While in Vietnam, his unit fought at The Rockpile. He was discharged in 1970. He built a memorial called "Rockpile II" in Wheaton, Wisconsin dedicated to those who served in the Vietnam War.

== Motorcycle injury ==
Zien is well known in Wisconsin for riding through the state on a motorcycle with full-size American and Wisconsin flags. He was inducted in the Motorcycle Hall of Fame in 2000. On March 13, 2011, Zien was seriously injured while traveling in Florida on his motorcycle. Dave Zien logged more than two million miles riding motorcycles before being critically injured in a violent highway crash in Florida. Even though the 61-year-old former state representative and senator lost part of his left leg – and almost his life – in the March crash, he has continued to ride, this time on a three-wheeled Harley-Davidson.

== Awards and recognition ==
During his time in office, Zien was the recipient of many awards, including the following: Legislator of the Year, membership in the American Legion, National MC Hall of Fame inductee with Peter Fonda, NRA Defender of Freedom Award presented by Charlton Heston, Outstanding Legislator, 1995–96, and NFlB Guardian of Small Business, 1995–96. WIAA State Wrestling Qualifier for Cadott High School.

== Controversy ==
On June 21, 2011, Zien and two Tea Party members were accused of harassing and assaulting members of the Solidarity Sing Along group in the Wisconsin State Capitol. Zien allegedly ran over group members' belongings with his wheelchair.

== Notes ==
Wisconsin Senate
Preceded by Marvin J. Roshell	Wisconsin State Senator - 23rd District; 1993 – 2007	Succeeded by Pat Kreitlow
Wisconsin State Assembly
Preceded by Joseph Looby	Wisconsin State Assemblyman - 68th District; 1989 – 1993	Succeeded by David Plombon
