= Old Abe State Trail =

Rail trail in Wisconsin, United States

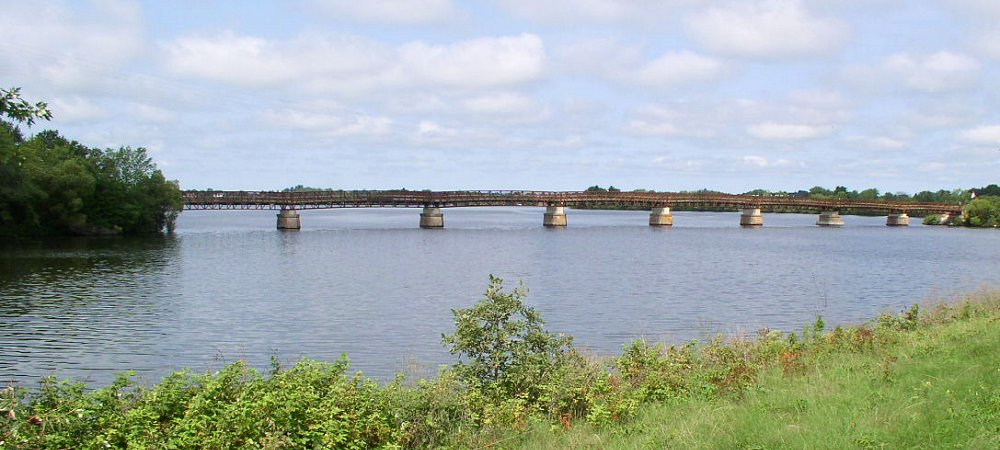
- Old Abe State Trail crossing the Chippewa River near where it flows into Lake Wissota
- Length: 19.5 mi (31.4 km)
- Location: Chippewa County, Wisconsin, USA
- Trailheads: Chippewa Falls; Cornell
- Use: Bicycling, hiking, in-line skating, horseback riding, snowmobiling, snowshoeing, cross-country skiing
- Difficulty: Easy
- Months: Year-round
- Sights: Chippewa River, Brunet Island State Park, Lake Wissota State Park

Old Abe State Trail is a 19.5-mile (31.4 km) paved multi-use rail trail in Chippewa County, Wisconsin, USA.

The name commemorates Old Abe, a bald eagle that was captured in 1861 by Ahgamahwegezhig, a Native American man, near the South Fork of the Flambeau River. At Jim Falls, which is on the trail, he sold the eagle to tavern keeper Daniel McCann, who in turn sold it to soldiers of the 8th Wisconsin Volunteer Infantry Regiment. Old Abe became their mascot, who accompanied them during many battles of the American Civil War. The reservoir behind the hydroelectric dam in Jim Falls is named "Old Abe Lake", and a 10½ foot statue of Old Abe has been erected near the dam.

The trail presently runs from the outskirts of Chippewa Falls to Cornell, following an abandoned railroad line on the undeveloped shoreline of the Chippewa River for most of its route. The trail also provides access between Lake Wissota State Park and Brunet Island State Park. Old Abe State Trail is managed cooperatively by the Wisconsin Department of Natural Resources and Chippewa County. An extension south to Eau Claire is planned to link to the Chippewa River State Trail.

== Location ==
- South terminus at corner of County Highway I and WIS 178 in Chippewa Falls (44°57′07″N 91°21′07″W)
- North terminus on Park Rd. in Cornell (45°10′12″N 91°09′11″W)
