= Hill, Wisconsin =

- Town
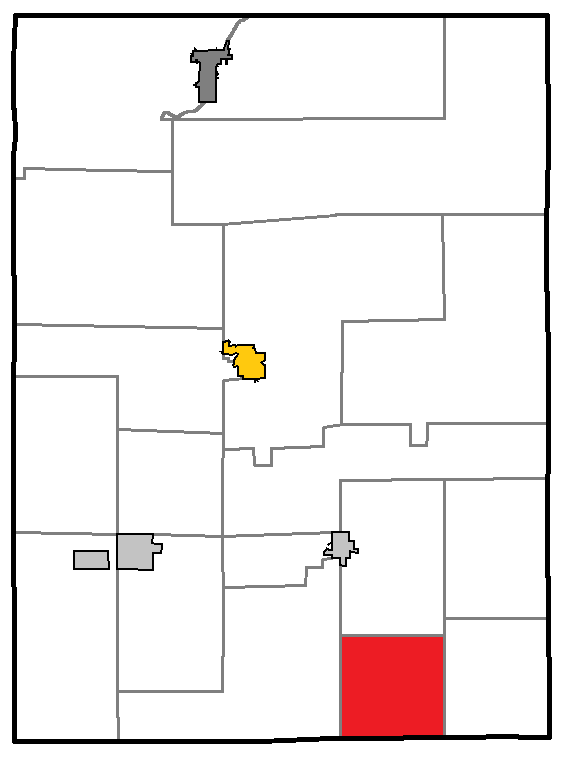
- Location of Hill, within Price County
- Coordinates: 45°26′7″N 90°13′16″W
- Country: United States
- State: Wisconsin
- County: Price

Area
  - Total: 35.8 sq mi (92.6 km^{2})
  - Land: 35.1 sq mi (90.8 km^{2})
  - Water: 0.69 sq mi (1.8 km^{2})
- Elevation: 1,713 ft (522 m)

Population (2020)
  - Total: 366
  - Density: 10.4/sq mi (4.03/km^{2})
- Time zone: UTC-6 (Central (CST))
  - Summer (DST): UTC-5 (CDT)
- Area codes: 715 & 534
- FIPS code: 55-34725
- GNIS feature ID: 1583392

Hill is a town in Price County, Wisconsin, United States. The population was 366 at the 2020 census. Timms Hill, the highest point in Wisconsin, is located in the town of Hill.

== Geography ==
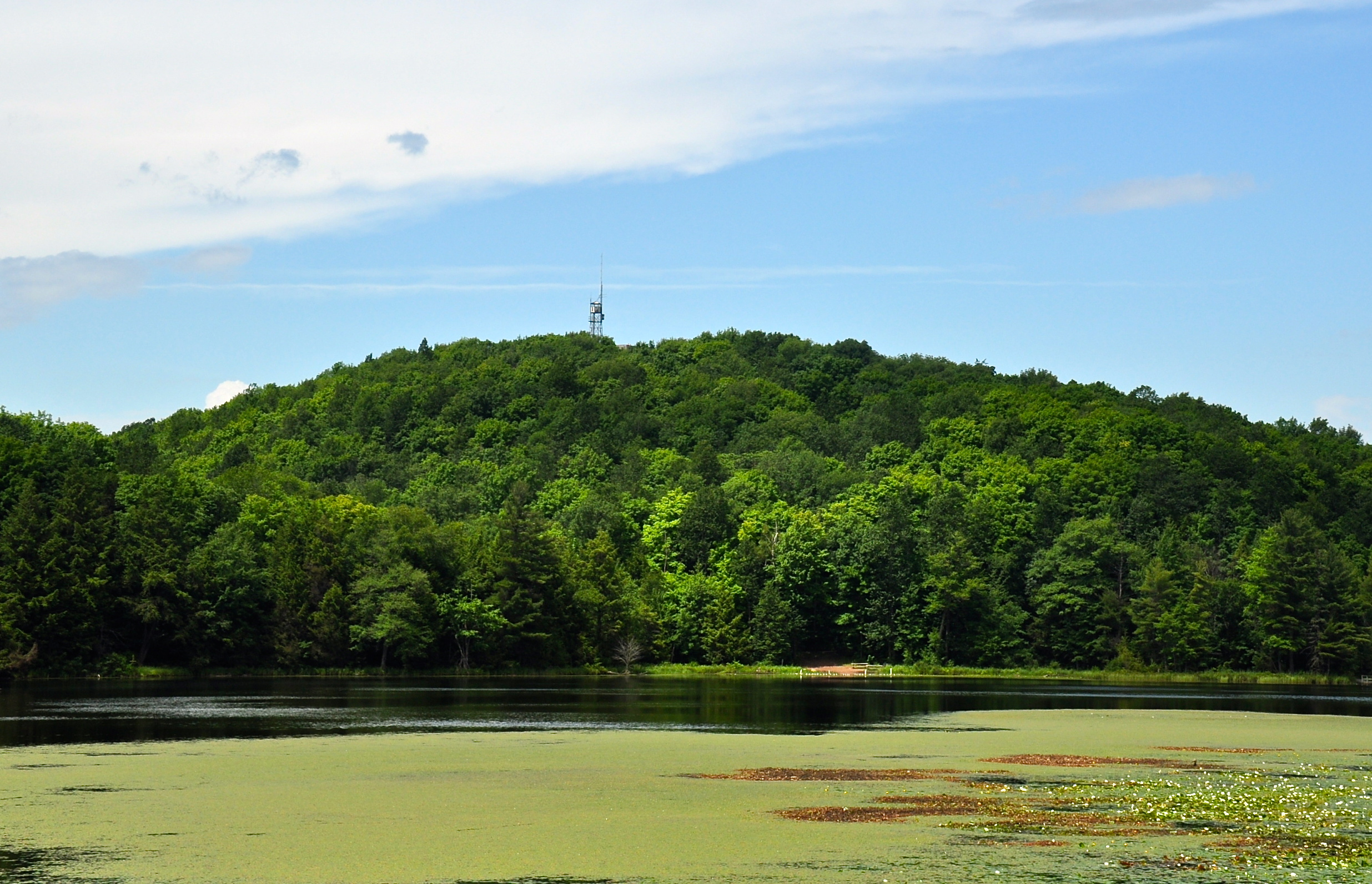
Timms Hill, the highest natural point in Wisconsin at 1951.5 feet, is located in the Town of Hill, Price County.

According to the United States Census Bureau, the town has a total area of 35.7 square miles (92.6 km^{2}), of which 35.0 square miles (90.8 km^{2}) is land and 0.7 square miles (1.8 km^{2}) is water.

== Demographics ==
As of the census of 2000, there were 364 people, 138 households, and 100 families residing in the town. The population density was 10.4 people per square mile (4.0/km^{2}). There were 197 housing units at an average density of 5.6 per square mile (2.2/km^{2}). The racial makeup of the town was 98.63% White, 0.82% Native American, 0.27% Asian, and 0.27% Pacific Islander. Hispanic or Latino people of any race were 0.27% of the population.

There were 138 households, out of which 32.6% had children under the age of 18 living with them, 63.8% were married couples living together, 3.6% had a female householder with no husband present, and 27.5% were non-families. 21.7% of all households were made up of individuals, and 10.9% had someone living alone who was 65 years of age or older. The average household size was 2.64 and the average family size was 3.03.

In the town, the population was spread out, with 26.6% under the age of 18, 7.1% from 18 to 24, 26.4% from 25 to 44, 26.1% from 45 to 64, and 13.7% who were 65 years of age or older. The median age was 40 years. For every 100 females, there were 122.0 males. For every 100 females age 18 and over, there were 111.9 males.

The median income for a household in the town was $34,464, and the median income for a family was $37,000. Males had a median income of $27,273 versus $26,250 for females. The per capita income for the town was $23,222. About 5.5% of families and 5.8% of the population were below the poverty line, including 7.8% of those under age 18 and 7.4% of those age 65 or over.
