= Cornell Pulpwood Stacker =

- U.S. National Register of Historic Places
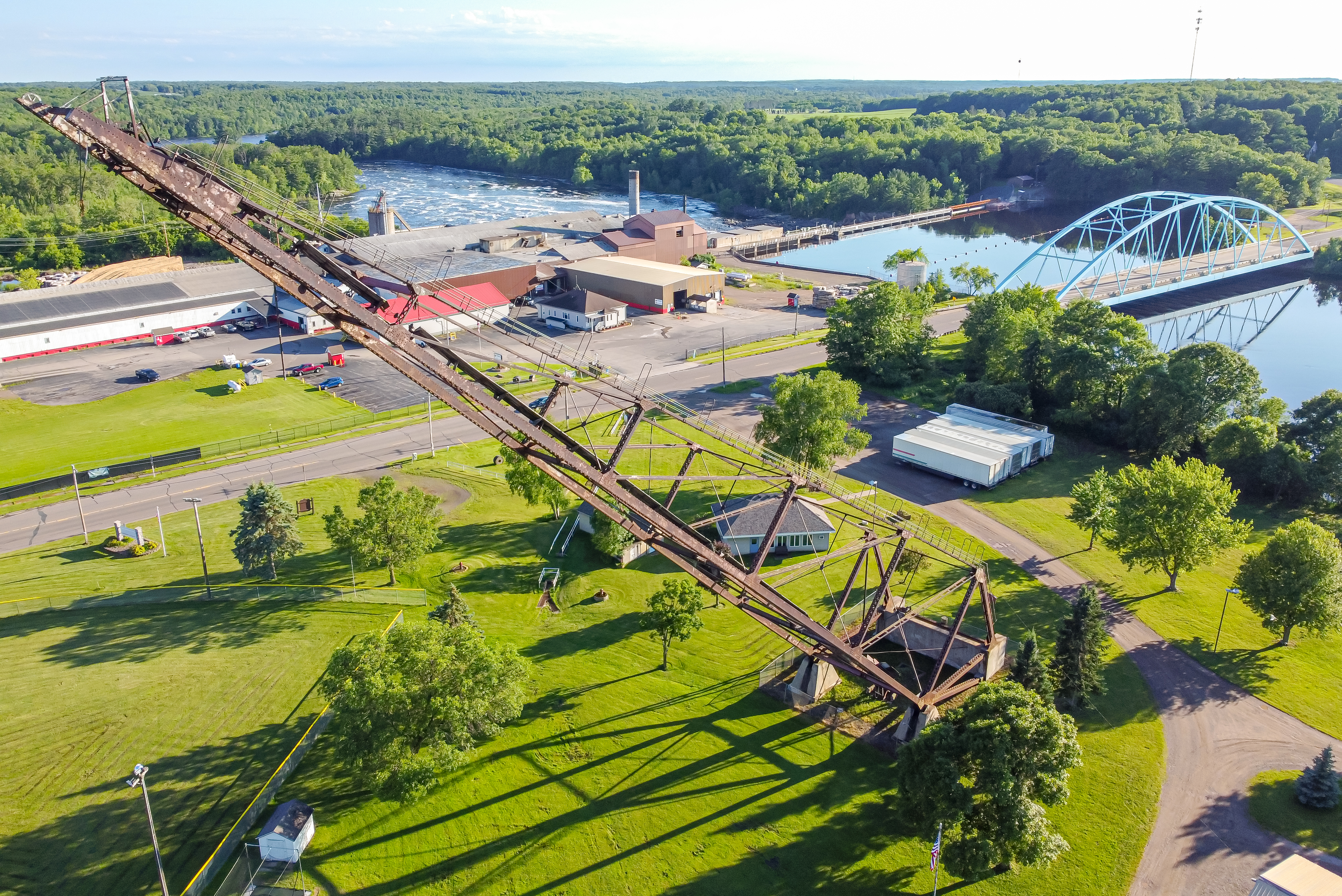
- Cornell Pulpwood Stacker, Cornell, Wisconsin

- Location within Wisconsin Location within the United States
- Location: Cornell Mill Yard Park; Cornell, Wisconsin, U.S.
- Coordinates: 45.16612°N 91.15515°W
- Built: 1912
- Architect: Joor Engineering Company of England (built by Minneapolis Tool and Machinery Company)
- NRHP reference No.: 93001425
- Added to NRHP: December 23, 1993

The Cornell Pulpwood Stacker is located at Millyard Park in Cornell, Wisconsin, United States. It was utilized to move pulpwood logs into large piles so they could be sent through waterways to paper mills. The stacker operated at the Cornell Wood Products Mill from 1912 until its obsolescence in 1971. It is listed both on the National Register of Historic Places, as well as on the Wisconsin State Historical Society's listing of Cornell Millyard Park.

== History ==
The Pulpwood Stacker on the east bank of the Chippewa River at Cornell, Wisconsin was manufactured to streamline the Cornell Wood Products Mill pulpwood process. It was designed by Joor Engineering Company of England and constructed on-site in 1912 by Minneapolis Tool and Machinery Company.

Wisconsin had become a major manufacturer of paper and pulpwood products in the United States by the last half of the 19th century. By extension, the timber industry was one of the state's most important employers. As the labor market changed in early part of the 20th century, employers looked towards mechanization to achieve the same results.

Timber was cut into logs at the pulpwood mill, and then stockpiled on the premises before being sent along the river to paper mills. Operating with a 35-bhp motor at a 45-degree angle, the 175-foot (53 m) double-trussed stacker replaced what had been a labor-intensive method of handling the timber product. It moved the cut logs into large piles on land, from which they could then be placed in the water for their journey to the paper mill.

The stacker's 36-foot (11 m) wide base narrows to a 10-foot (3.0 m) tip giving it an elongated pyramid shape. It moved logs with a wire and metal conveyor system, and expelled them through a chute. Similar to how a bridge is repaired, a catwalk along one side is provided for maintenance workers to climb up and down the equipment. It became obsolete in 1971, replaced by more economical and effective methods of moving logs. A fire two decades later destroyed most of the stacker buildings.

== Millyard Park and historic certification ==
Both the stacker and land upon which it sits are now owned by the city of Cornell, which created Millyard Park to commemorate that part of the city's history. The stacker's condition had deteriorated by 1991, and the city began fund raising with a goal of collecting $50,000 for needed repairs. On October 10 of that year, the Cornell City Council made application to the Wisconsin State Historical Society, and the National Register of Historic Places in an effort to qualify for matching funds. Wisconsin State Historical Society added Cornell Millyard Park to the state register of historic properties on July 9, 1993. The stacker alone was added to the National Register of Historic Places on December 23, 1993. In their research into its qualifications for historic status, the National Park Service concluded that it "is possibly the only remaining structure of its kind."

A "Save the Stacker" fund was set up in Cornell, where as of 2009, it was estimated that it would take a minimum of $350,000 to clean off the rust and refinish the old equipment, a process that would require workers to climb up the left side of the 175-foot (53 m) stacker at its 45-degree angle. As of 2016, the city approved $23,000 from a special fund to make needed repairs. The city's long-range goal is to raise $500,000 within the next two decades for a complete renovation.
