= Cornell Municipal Airport =

- IATA: none; ICAO: none; FAA LID: 4WI9

Summary
- Airport type: Private
- Owner/Operator: Cornell Aeroworks LLC
- Location: Cornell, Wisconsin
- Opened: October 1950
- Time zone: CST (UTC−06:00)
  - Summer (DST): CDT (UTC−05:00)
- Elevation AMSL: 1,154 ft (352 m)
- Coordinates: 45°09′55.88″N 91°06′20.51″W

Map
- Location of airport in Wisconsin 4WI9 (the United States)

Runways
Direction	Length		Surface
Direction	ft	m	Surface
9/27	2,420	738	Asphalt

Statistics
- Aircraft operations (2010): 1,810
- Based aircraft (2024): 7
- Source: Federal Aviation Administration

Cornell Municipal Airport (FAA LID: 4WI9) (formerly 2H3) is a private-use airport located two nautical miles (3.4 km) east of the central business district of Cornell, a city in Chippewa County, Wisconsin, United States.

== Facilities and aircraft ==
Cornell Municipal Airport covers an area of 143 acres (58 ha) at an elevation of 1154 feet (352 m) above mean sea level. It has a single runway: 9/27 is 2,420 by 45 feet (738 x 14 m) with an asphalt surface. The airport provides 100LL and Mogas fuel.

For the 12-month period ending September 2, 2010, the airport had 1,810 aircraft operations, an average of 35 per week; 88% transient general aviation, 11% local general aviation and less than 1% military. In August 2024, there were 7 aircraft based at this airport: all 7 single-engine.

== See also ==
- List of airports in Wisconsin
