= Larry Balow =

American politician

Member of the Eau Claire City Council
- In office April 18, 2008 – April 16, 2013
- Constituency: at-large

Member of the Wisconsin State Assembly from the 68th district
- In office 1998–2004
- Preceded by: Chuck Schafer
- Succeeded by: Terry Moulton

Personal details
- Born: April 29, 1943 (age 83) Eau Claire, Wisconsin
- Party: Democratic
- Education: University of Wisconsin-Eau Claire
- Occupation: Firefighter, Small business Owner, Legislator
- Website: Eau Claire City Council

Larry C. Balow (born April 29, 1943) is an American Politician, who most recently served as an at large alderman on the Eau Claire, Wisconsin City Council. He served as a member of the Wisconsin State Assembly from the 68th assembly district from 1998 to 2004. He did not seek reelection in 2004, and was succeeded by Terry Moulton.

Prior to his election to the Wisconsin State Legislature, he served as a member of the Eau Claire City Council from 1995 to 1999. He ran for reelection to the city council for the April 6, 2010 general election, and was reelected. He had been endorsed by the Greater West Central Area Labor Council and AFSCME.

== Early life and career ==
Larry C. Balow was born in Eau Claire, Wisconsin, on April 29, 1943. He graduated from Eau Claire Memorial High School and attended technical college from 1962 to 1963. He is married with 3 children. Before his political career, Prior to his career on the Eau Claire City Council and in the Wisconsin State Legislature, Balow served as a firefighter and a small business owner.

=== State Assembly ===
Balow served as a member of the Eau Claire City Council from 1995 to 1999. He was elected to the Wisconsin State Assembly in 1998 and reelected in 2000. He was a member of the following assembly committees; Agriculture, Colleges and Universities, Rural Development, Small Business, Corrections and the Courts, Financial Institutions, Insurance, Transportation Projects Commission, Small Business and Economic Development, and Transportation. In March 2003, Representative Balow announced that he would offer an amendment to the Wisconsin state budget that would keep Wisconsin's Pet Facilities Law on the books. He was applauded by many of his constituents and animal rights activists.

=== Eau Claire City Council ===
After not seeking reelection to the Wisconsin State Assembly and being succeeded by Terry Moulton in 2004, Balow was elected again as an At-large representative on the Eau Claire City Council. As a councilman, he proposed the city examine ways to grow its tax base - including revisiting the concept of a convention center that could be a public-private partnership. He said such a center would be a third leg to the area's existing economy, which relied heavily on retail and medical businesses. He was generally considered a fiscal conservative on the city council. He did not seek re-election in 2013.
