= David Duax =

American politician

Dave Duax
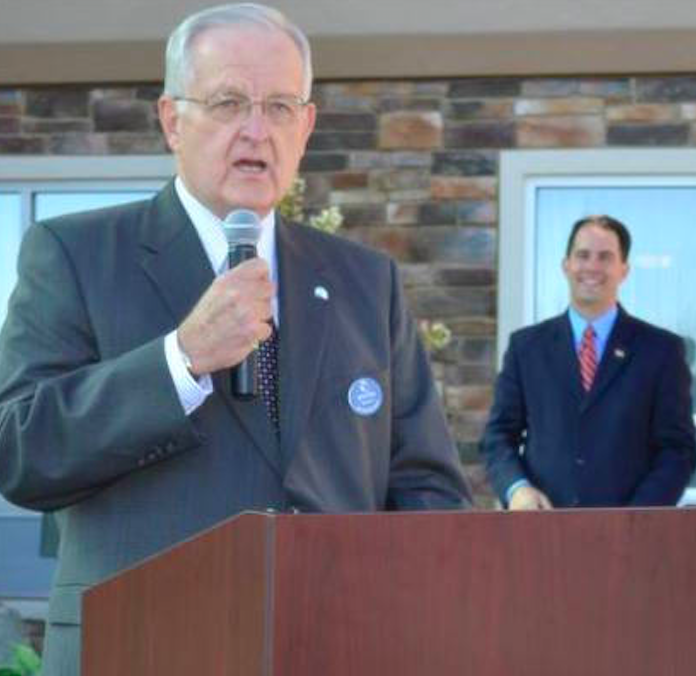
- Duax speaking to reporters in 2013, with Governor Scott Walker in background.

Administrator of the Wisconsin Division of Youth Services
- In office 1989–1994
- Governor: Tommy Thompson

Director of the State Office of Health Care
- In office 1987–1988
- Governor: Tommy Thompson

Personal details
- Born: February 1, 1944 Eau Claire, Wisconsin, United States
- Died: April 17, 2015 (aged 71) Eau Claire, Wisconsin, United States
- Party: Republican
- Spouse: Kathryn Proctor
- Education: University of Wisconsin–Eau Claire; University of Wisconsin Law School

David Leo Francis "Dave" Duax (February 1, 1944 – April 17, 2015) was a Wisconsin politician who served in the cabinet of Wisconsin Governor Tommy Thompson as the State Administrator of the Division for Youth Services. He previously served as director of the State Office of Health Care. Duax was the chairman of the Eau Claire County Board of Supervisors, and served as vice president of the Eau Claire City Council.

== Education and career ==
Duax was born in Eau Claire on February 1, 1944, to Leo and Corinne (Johnson) Duax. He attended UWEC Campus school and Eau Claire Memorial High School. Duax participated in debate club and was the president of the Junior Classical League.{ He attended Carlton College and obtained his degree in political science from UW-Eau Claire and later studied law at the University of Wisconsin Law School. He served on the UWEC student and was chair of the 10th District Young Republicans. Duax was fluent in Latin, and interned in Washington, D.C. during college. In 1972, he ran to represent the 68th Assembly District in the Wisconsin State Assembly against Incumbent Joseph Looby. He received 8,730 votes and Looby received 12,599 votes.

Duax served on the Eau Claire County Board from 1974 to 1983 and was elected chairman of the board. In February 1980, Duax was appointed by Governor Lee Dreyfus to serve as the first chairman of the Governor's Task Force on County Government Organization and Administration. He served as the administrator of the Division for Youth Services from 1990 to 1994, director of the State Office of Health Care from 1987 to 1988, and administrator of management services in the Wisconsin Department of Agriculture, Trade, and Consumer Protection. He also oversaw the Lincoln Hills Detention Center and the Ethan Allen School for Boys. The governor appointed Thompson as the administrator of the Interstate Compact on Juveniles. After working in Governor Thompson's administration, Duax was the director of development and communications for Sacred Heart Hospital. In 2005, he was elected to the Eau Claire City Council, and later served as its vice president.

He was instrumental in the terminal remodeling/expansion of the Chippewa Valley Regional Airport, and the new jail and courthouse in Eau Claire. He authored a citywide smoking ban, among many other municipal ordinances. He served on the city planning commission, the Wisconsin Aeronautics Board, president of the Wisconsin Aviation Hall of Fame, member of the Chippewa Valley Airport Commission, and chaired the Sesquicentennial celebration commission in the State of Wisconsin. Duax was named "Person of the Year" by the Wisconsin Airport Management Association in 1979.

== Personal life and death ==
In 1993, he married Kathryn Proctor. He had been a stepfather to Kathryn's two children.

Duax died on April 17, 2015, after complications from a brain aneurysm. Hundreds attended his funeral, with Tommy Thompson delivering the eulogy. He was buried at Forest Hill Cemetery in Eau Claire.

== Legacy ==
After his death, the Wisconsin State Legislature passed a joint resolution, 2015 Assembly Joint Resolution 41, honoring his life and contributions. In 2015, The Chippewa Valley Regional Airport Commission Room was renamed the Duax Commission Room. In 2016, Wisconsin-based advocacy organization Fierce Freedom began the "Dave Duax Bipartisanship Award" to honor legislators that work across the aisle to combat human trafficking in Wisconsin.
