= Lake Wissota State Park =

State park in Chippewa County, Wisconsin

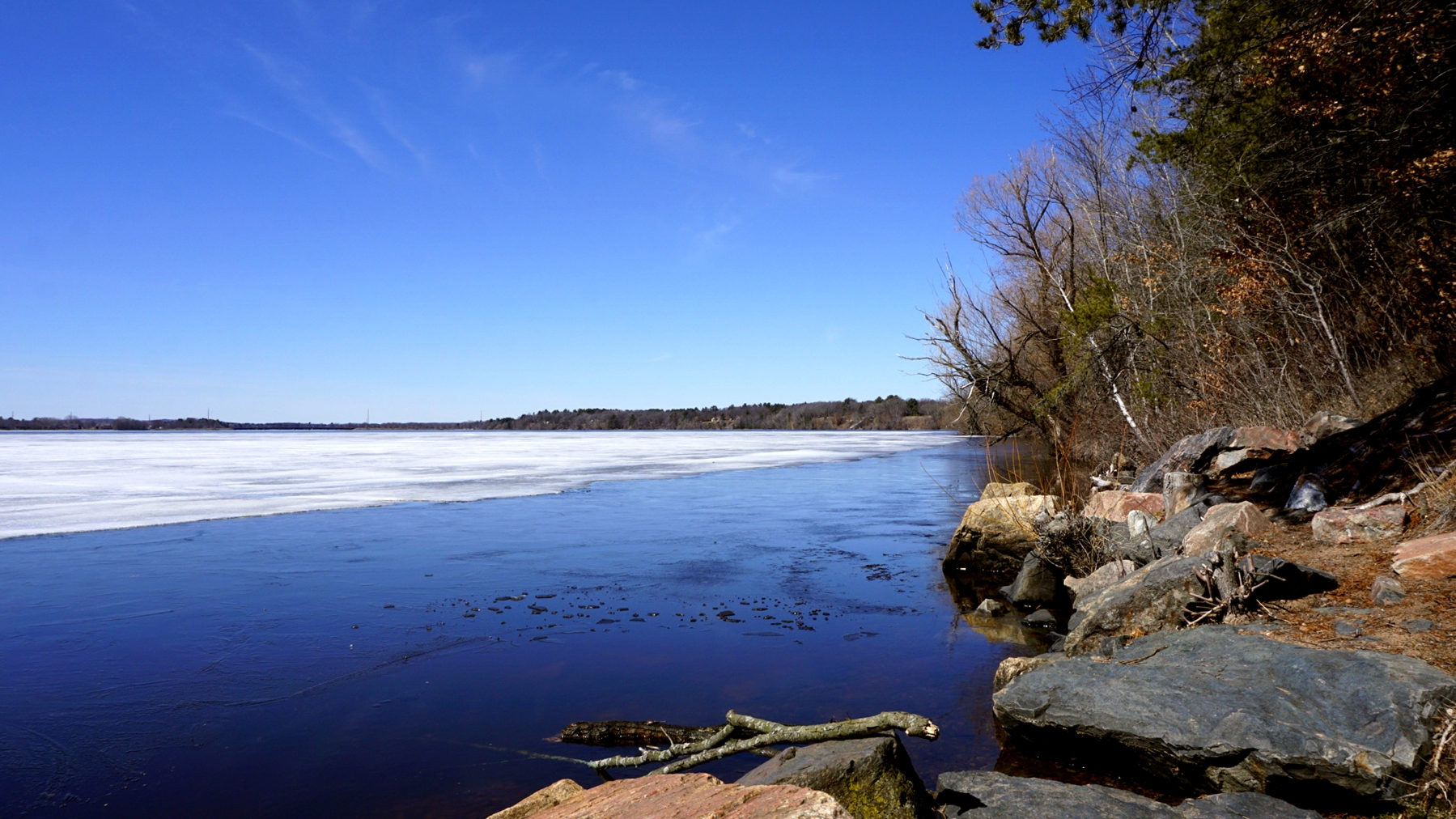

- Location within Wisconsin Location within the United States
- Interactive map of Lake Wissota State Park
- Location: Chippewa County, Wisconsin, United States
- Coordinates: 44°58′12″N 91°17′52″W
- Area: 1,062 acres (430 ha)
- Elevation: 899 ft (274 m)
- Established: 1962
- Administrator: Wisconsin Department of Natural Resources
- Website: Official website
- Wisconsin State Parks

Lake Wissota State Park is a 1,062-acre (430 ha) Wisconsin state park near the town of Chippewa Falls. The park is situated on the northeast shore of Lake Wissota, a reservoir on the Chippewa River. Camping, boating, and fishing are the most popular activities. Park lands are covered in a mix of pine/hardwood forests and prairie. Visitors can access the Old Abe State Trail and bike or hike 17.5 miles (28.2 km) to Brunet Island State Park.

== Geology ==
The bedrock beneath the park is two billion year old granite, which is overlain by 600 million year old Cambrian sandstone. An outcrop of this sandstone is visible south of the swimming beach. Otherwise these rock layers are blanketed by a thick layer of glacial sand and gravel. During the last ice age 15,000 years ago the Chippewa Lobe of the Wisconsin glaciation ended just six miles (10 km) northeast of the park. When the glaciers melted 10,000 years ago, rock debris settled in a 12-mile (19 km) wide outwash plain where the park is today. The prodigious meltwater also carved the valley of the Chippewa River.

== History ==
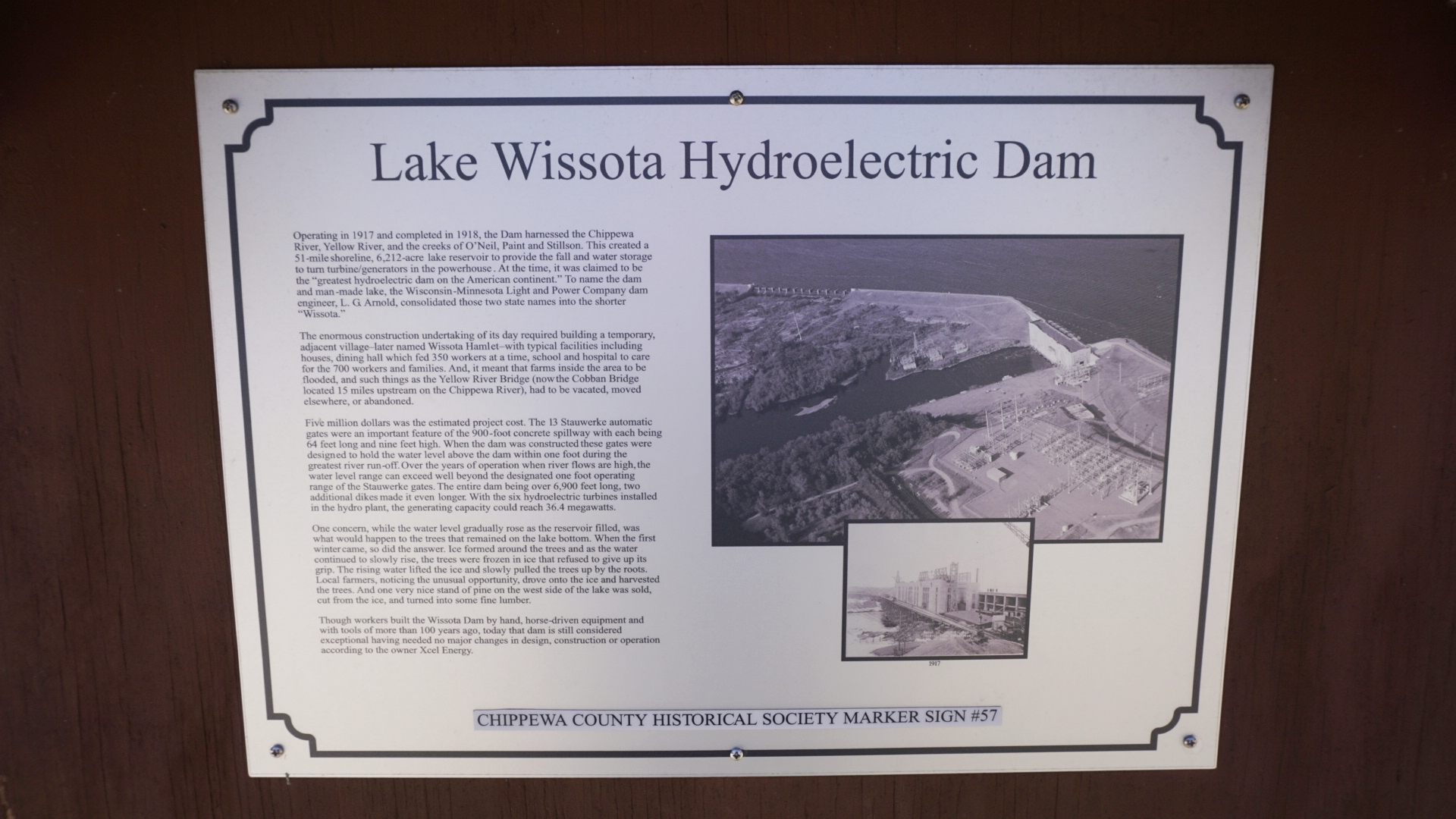
A plaque detailing the history of the Wissota Hydroelectric Dam.

It has been estimated that the Chippewa River Valley once contained one-sixth of the United States' white pine stands. The entire valley was extensively logged for this target species from the mid-to-late 19th century. Once the harvest-able timber was gone, farmers began settling in the cleared out land.

The Chippewa River was dammed for hydroelectric power in 1917, creating Lake Wissota.

As the sandy soil was marginal farmland, twelve landowners took advantage the federal Soil Bank Program between the mid-1950s and early 70s. This erosion-control program paid farmers to plant trees, and 205 acres (83 ha) here were planted with red pines. Today these trees still flank the park road near the campground.

Legislation authorizing the state park passed in 1961, championed by state senator Davis Donnelly. Wisconsin spent a decade acquiring 990 acres (400 ha) from various owners and developing services. The park formally opened to the public in 1972.

== Flora and fauna ==
Lake Wissota State Park lies in the transition zone between prairie and temperate forest. The forest itself is a mix of hardwoods such as sugar maple and oak and softwoods such as red and white pine.

Greatly disrupted by decades of logging and farming, these vegetative communities are healthy again after extensive restoration ecology efforts. Controlled burning is conducted in the prairie. As a sustainable management model, the red pine stand is periodically thinned for maximum health. There are demonstration shoreline restoration projects near the swimming beach to educate homeowners about improving their lake frontage.

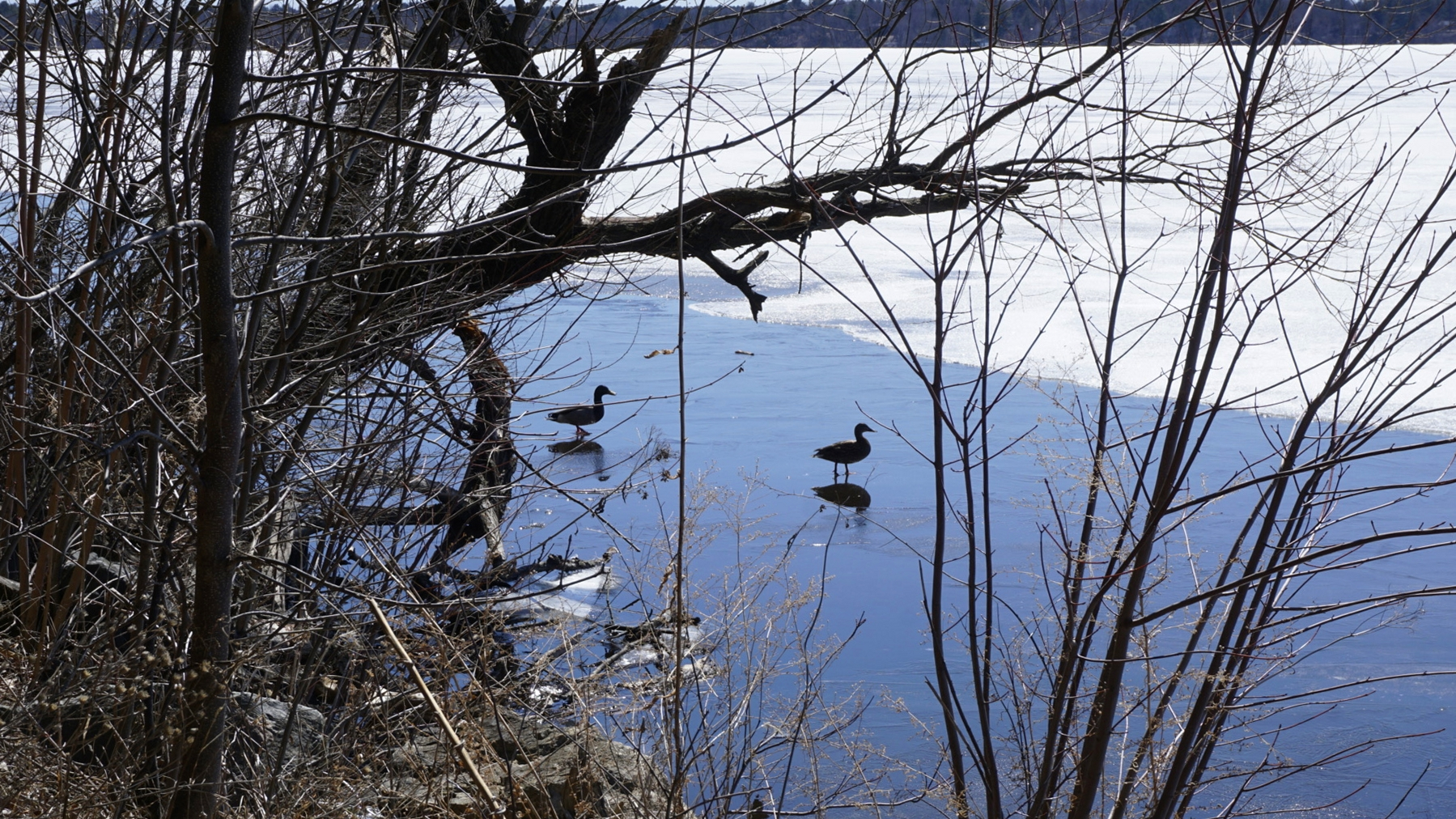
Two ducks out for a stroll on a frozen lake.

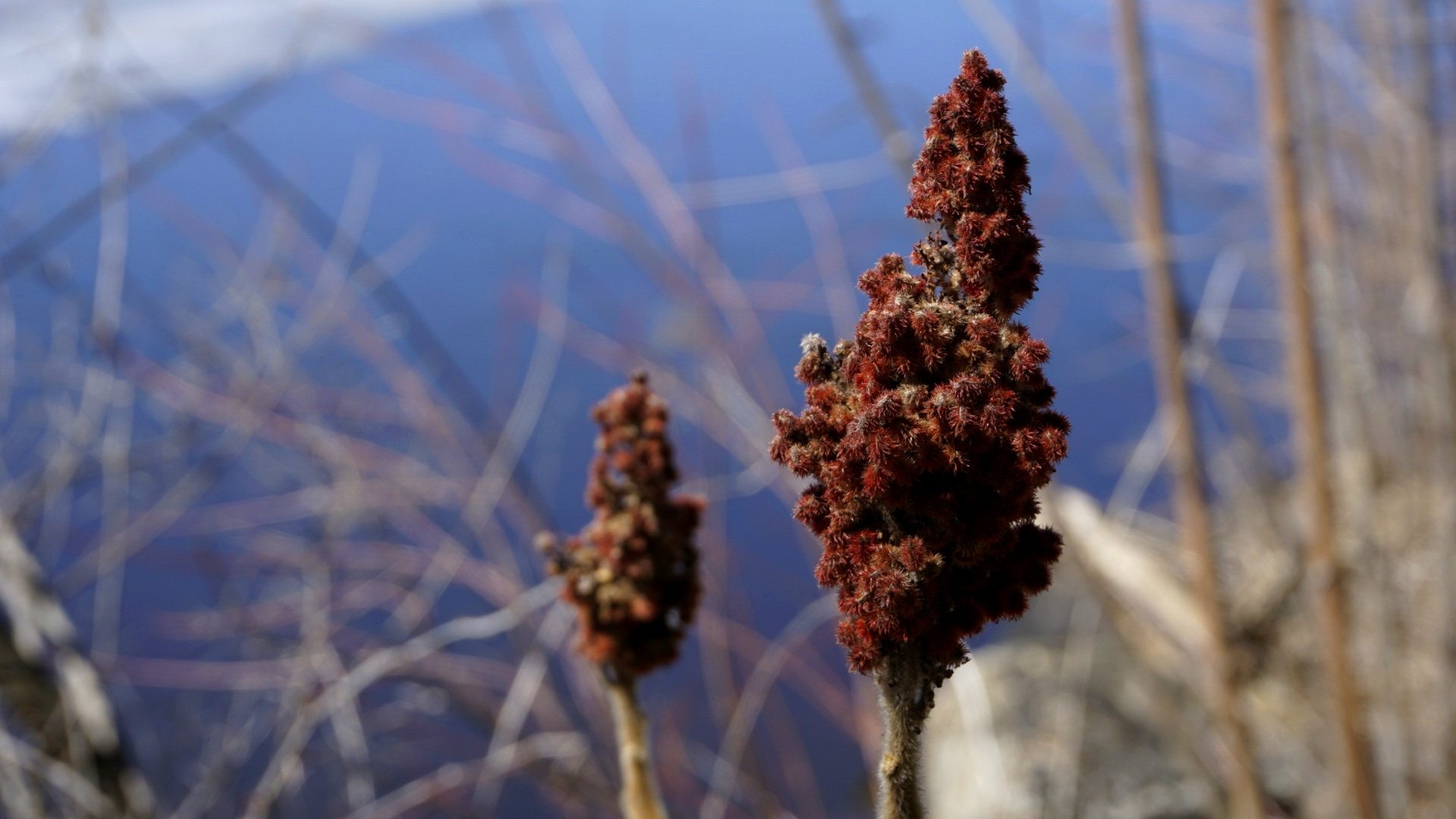
Sumac beginning to bloom with the lake in the background.

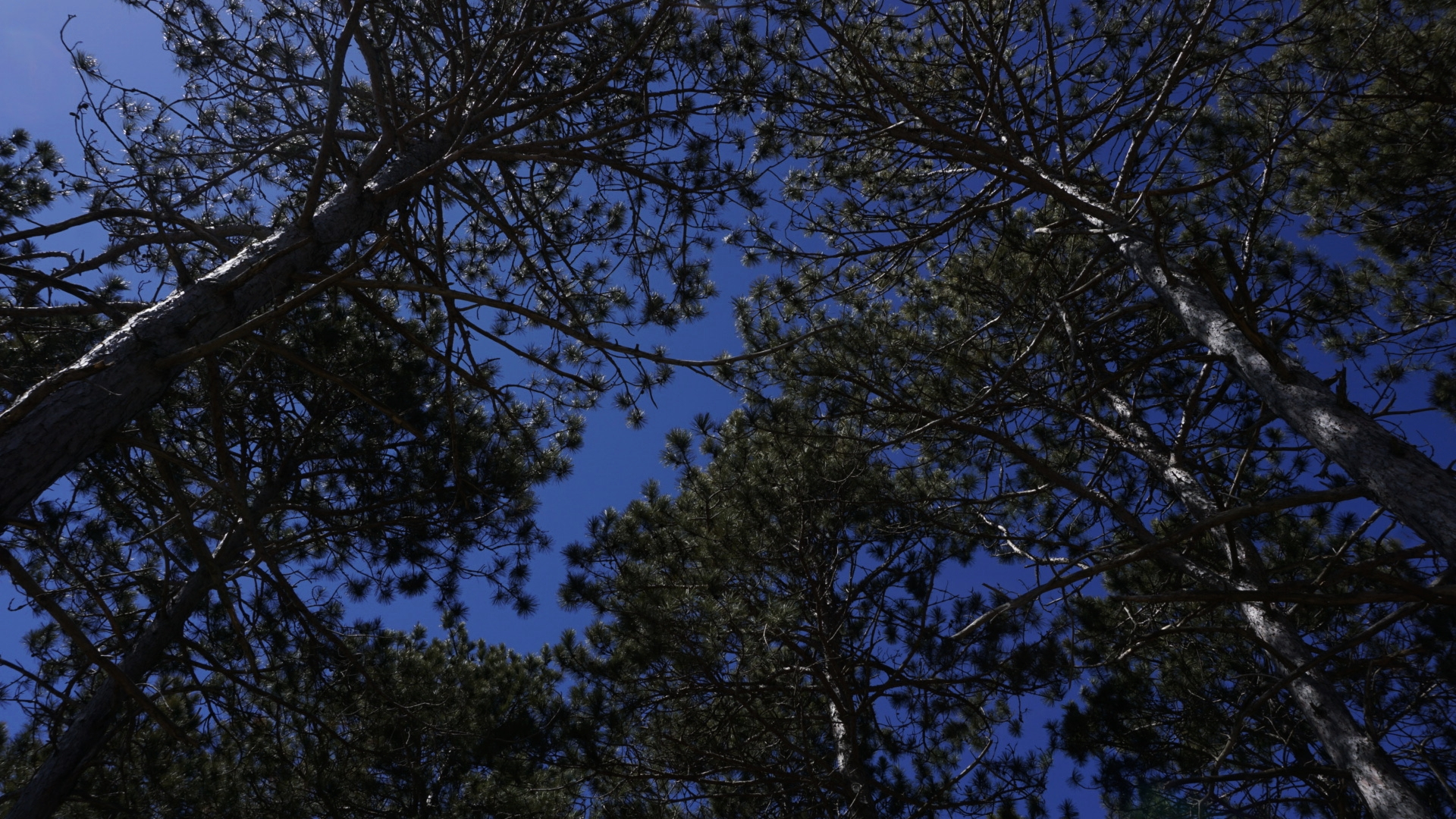
Looking up at several tall pine trees.

== Recreation ==
The primary attraction of Lake Wissota State Park is its access to water recreation. The unguarded 285-foot (87 m) swimming beach, located on a quiet arm of the lake, is very popular on summer weekends. There is a two-lane launching ramp for power boats and fishing boats. Nearby is a canoe rental and a 25-foot (8 m) fishing pier specially built to be handicap-accessible. Game fish in Lake Wissota include walleye, muskies, bass, panfish, northern pike, catfish, and sturgeon. Fish cribs have been dropped into the lake to provide habitat for crappies and smallmouth bass. In winter visitors can go ice fishing for crappies, walleye, and bluegill.

The family campground contains 81 wooded sites, 17 with electrical hookups. At the south end of the park are two primitive, tent-only group campgrounds. One accommodates up to 100 people and the other up to 80 people.

There are 17.4 miles (28.0 km) of summer trails, most of which allow horses and mountain bikes. The Beaver Meadow Nature Trail is a shady, one mile (1.6 km) loop with interpretive signs which passes a wetland, a fern garden, natural springs, and an ancient river bed. In winter, there are 9.6 miles (15.4 km) of trail for snowshoeing, 7 miles (11 km) for cross-country skiing, and 5 miles (8 km) for snowmobiling.

The unstaffed Karen Lea Nature Center has tables of hands-on exhibits, and there are naturalist-led programs offered during summer weekends. The park also features two baseball diamonds and a volleyball court.

== Gallery ==
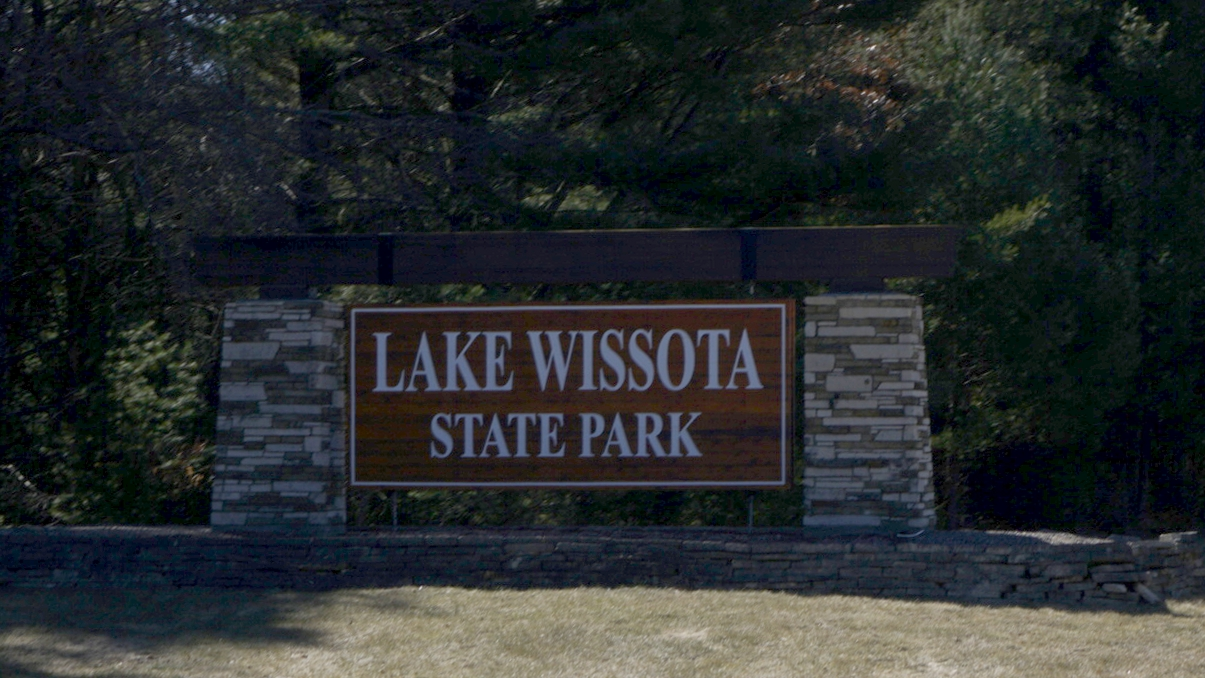
A sign welcoming visitors to the park.

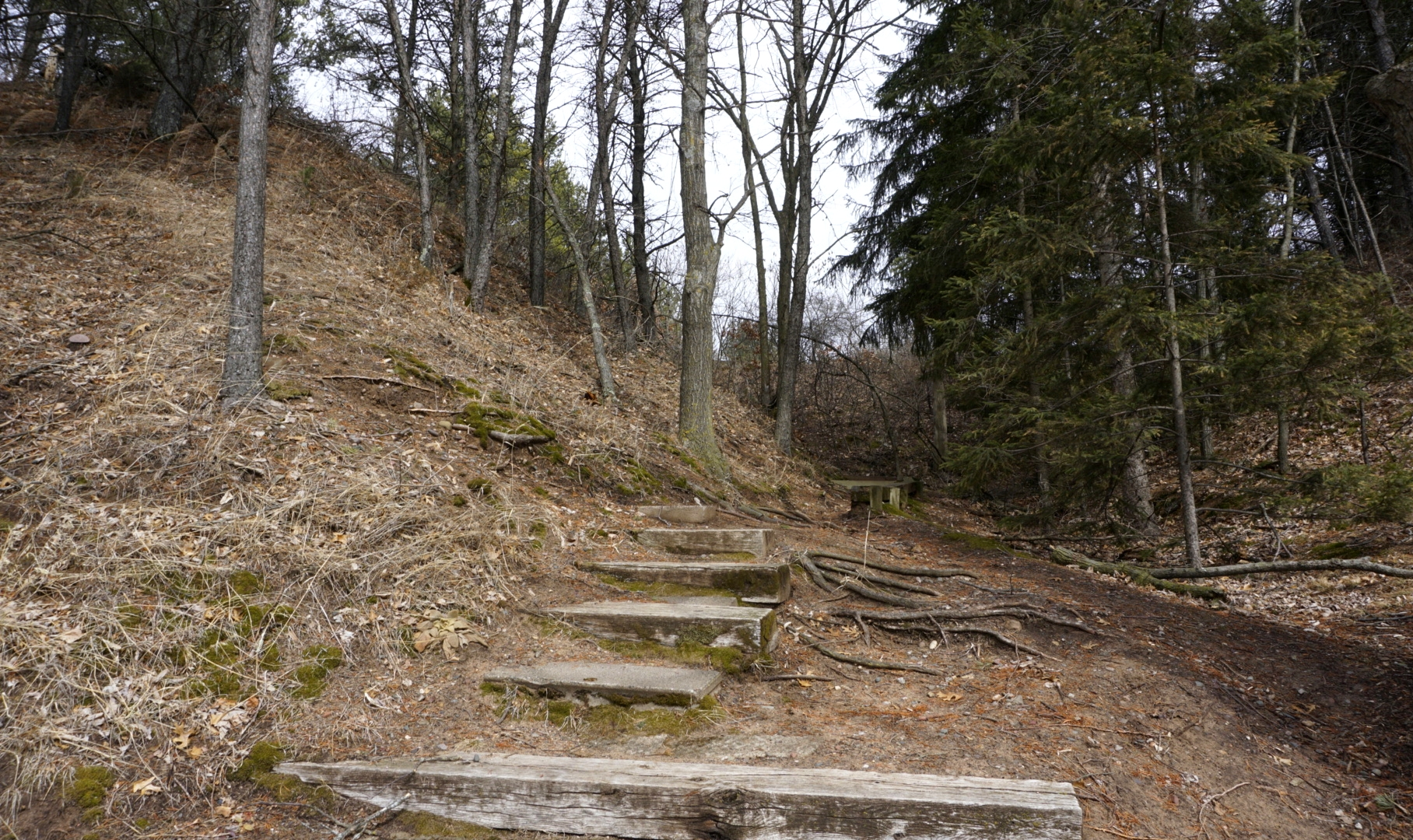
Steps leading down to the lake.

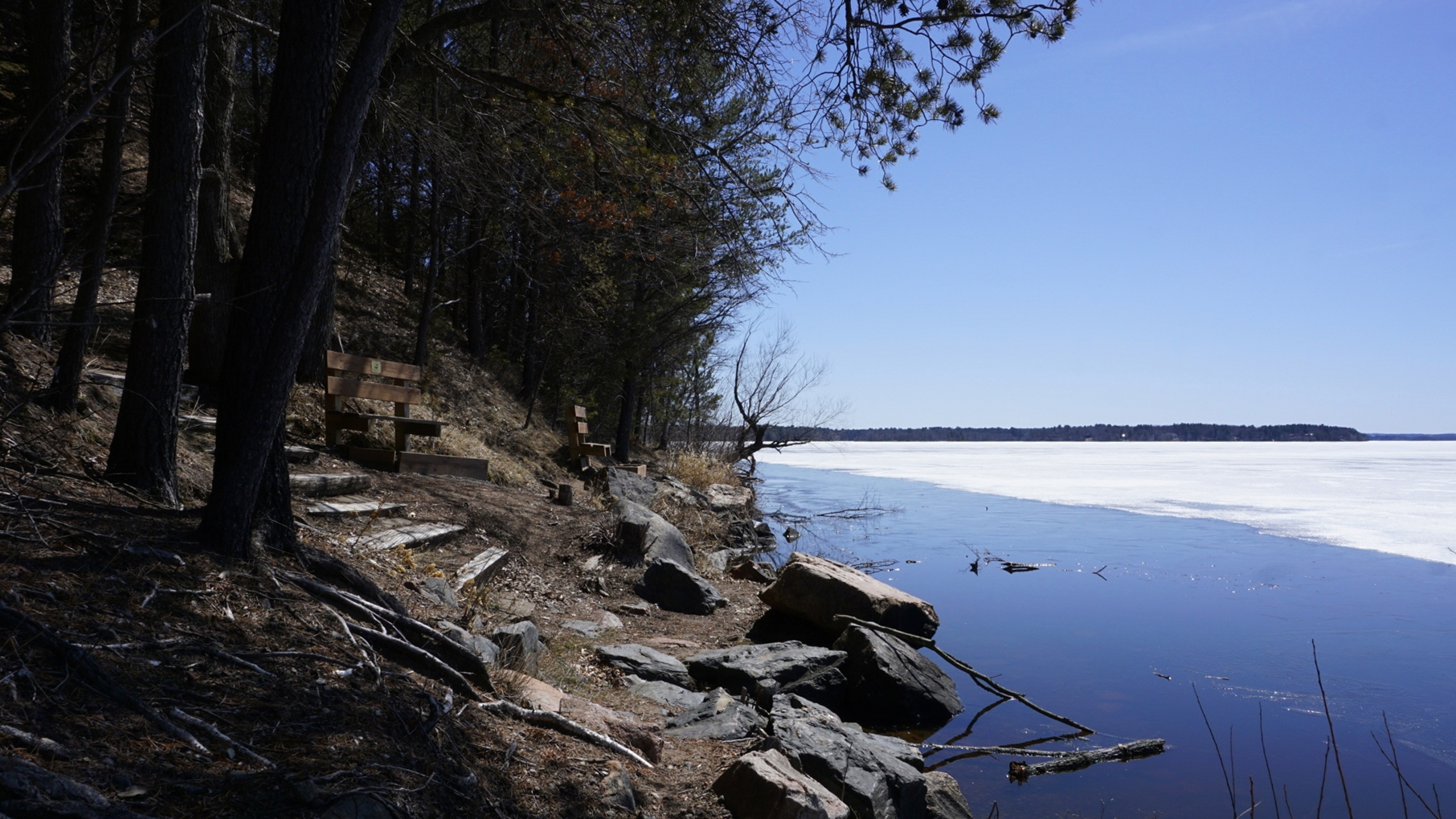
A view of the shoreline during summer.

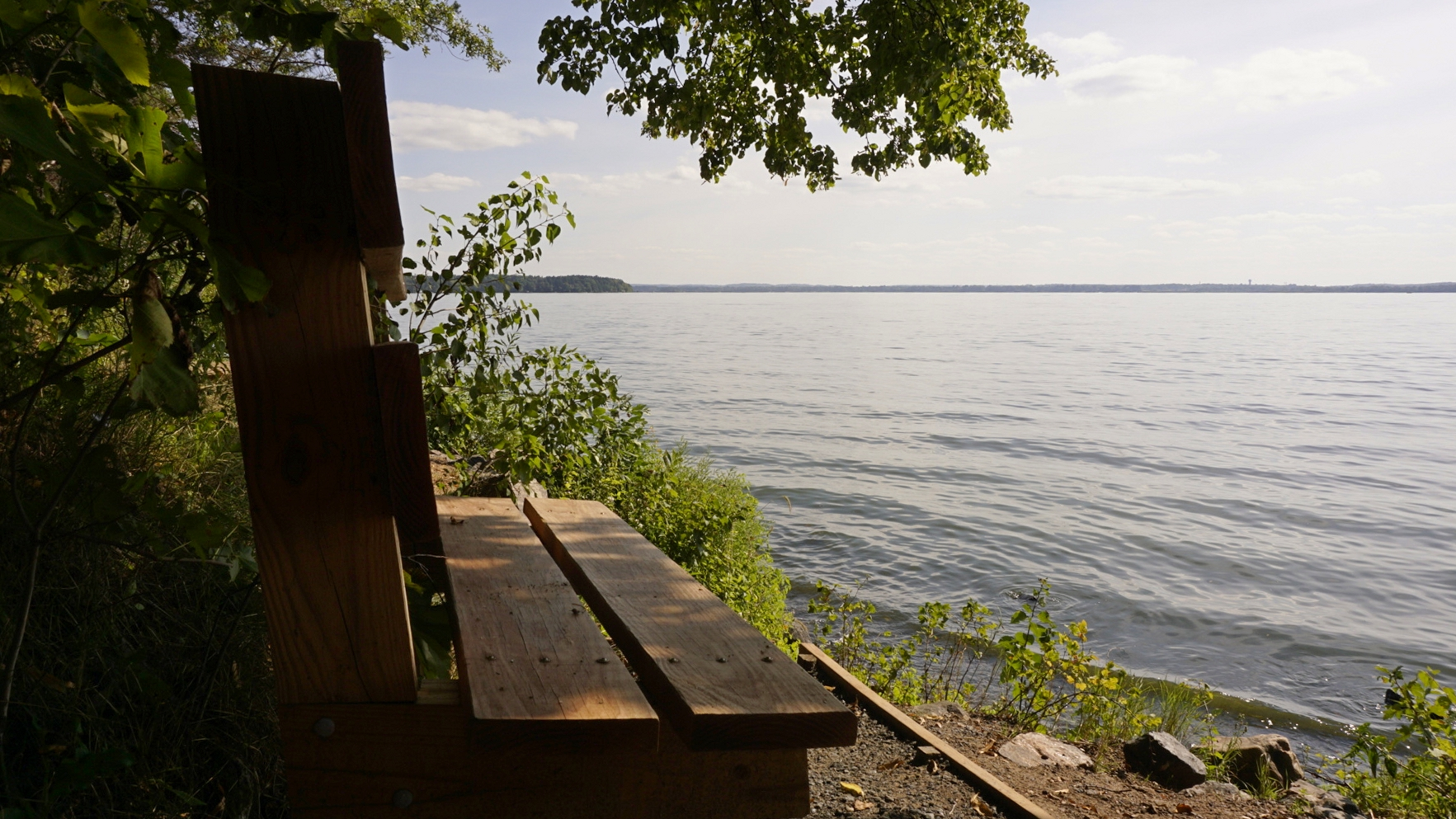
A wooden bench overlooks the lake on a warm August day.

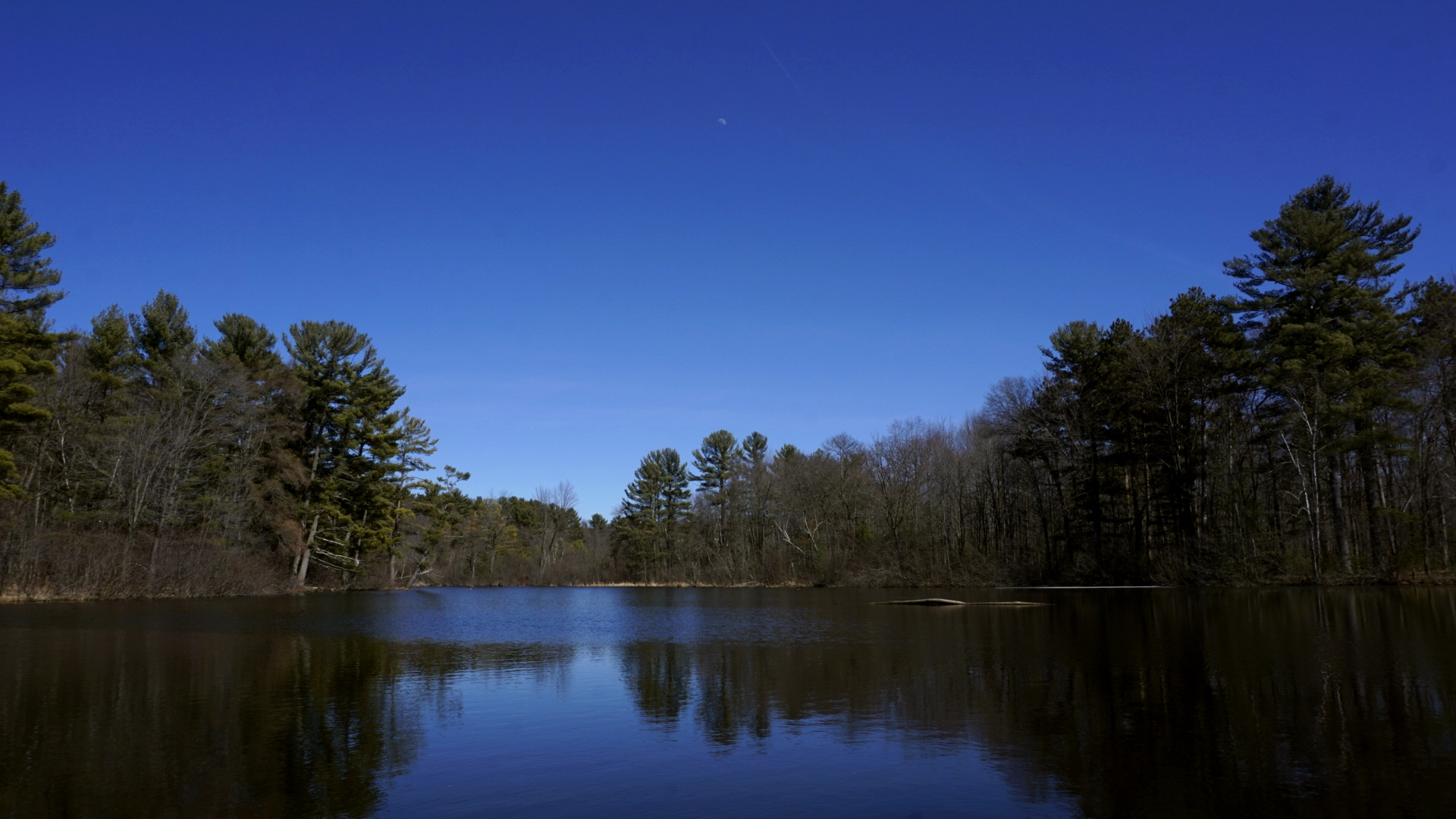
Boat launching arm of the lake.

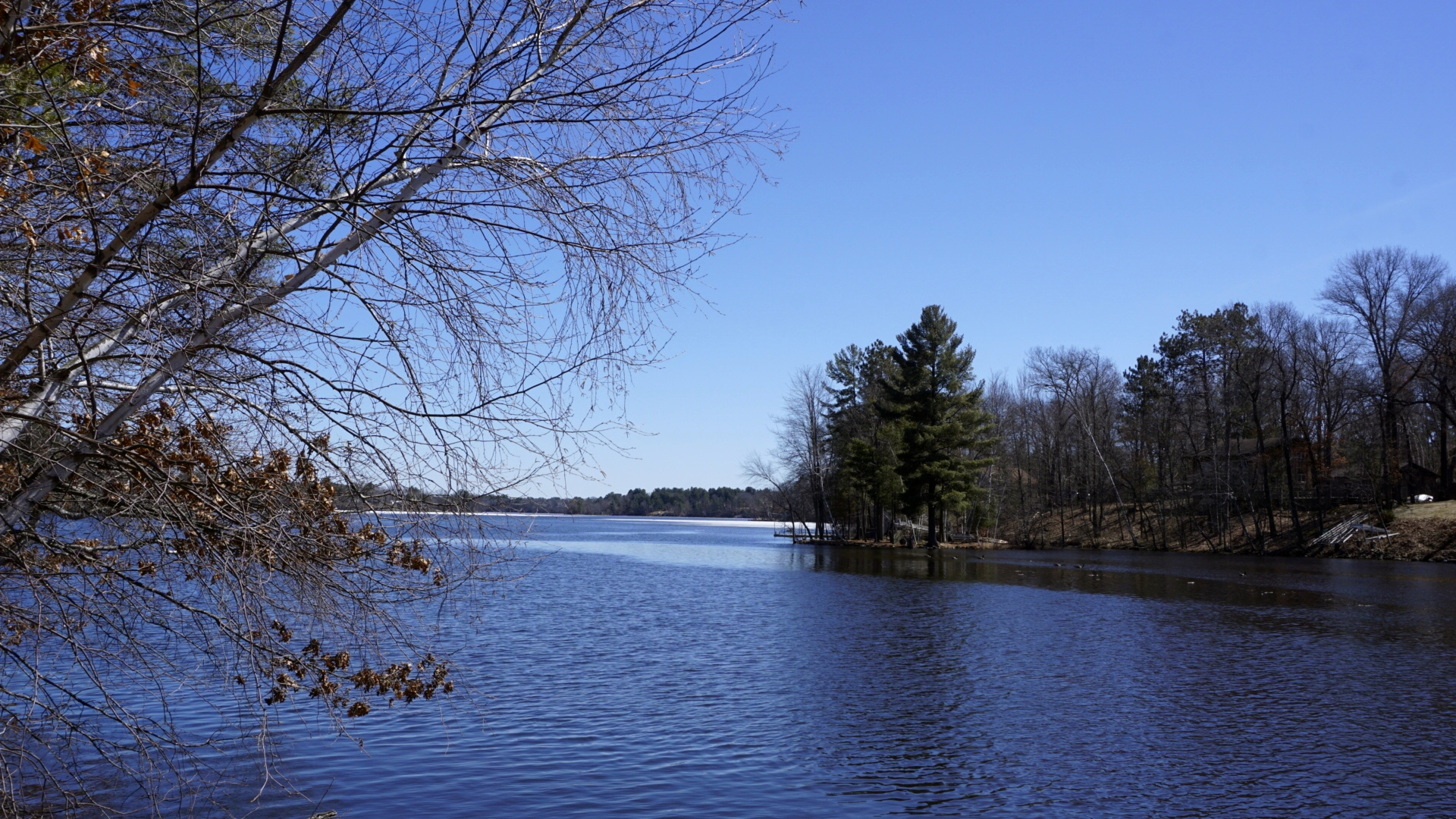
Ducks and geese swimming near lakefront property.

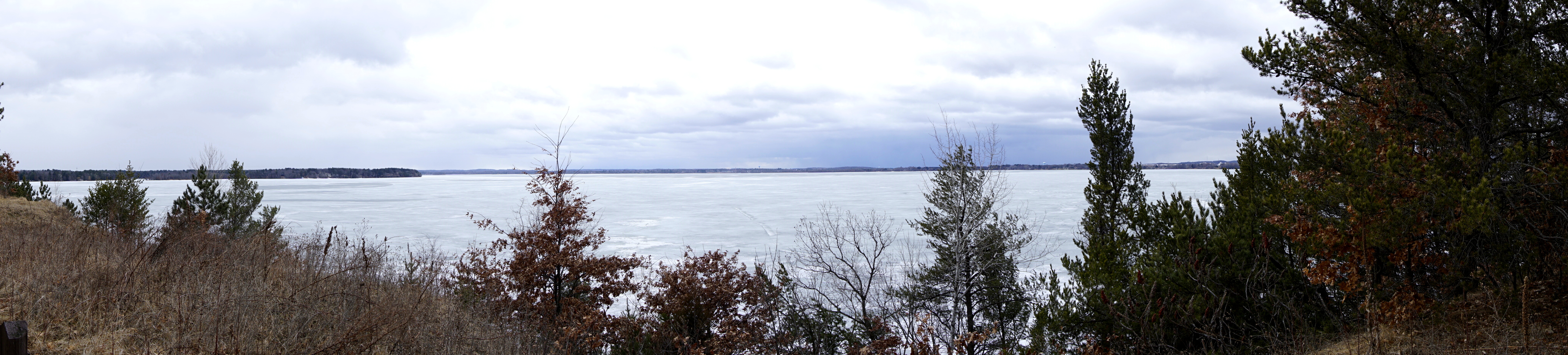
Panoramic view of Lake Wissota from one of the scenic overlooks.
