= Timms Hill =

Highest natural point in Wisconsin, U.S.

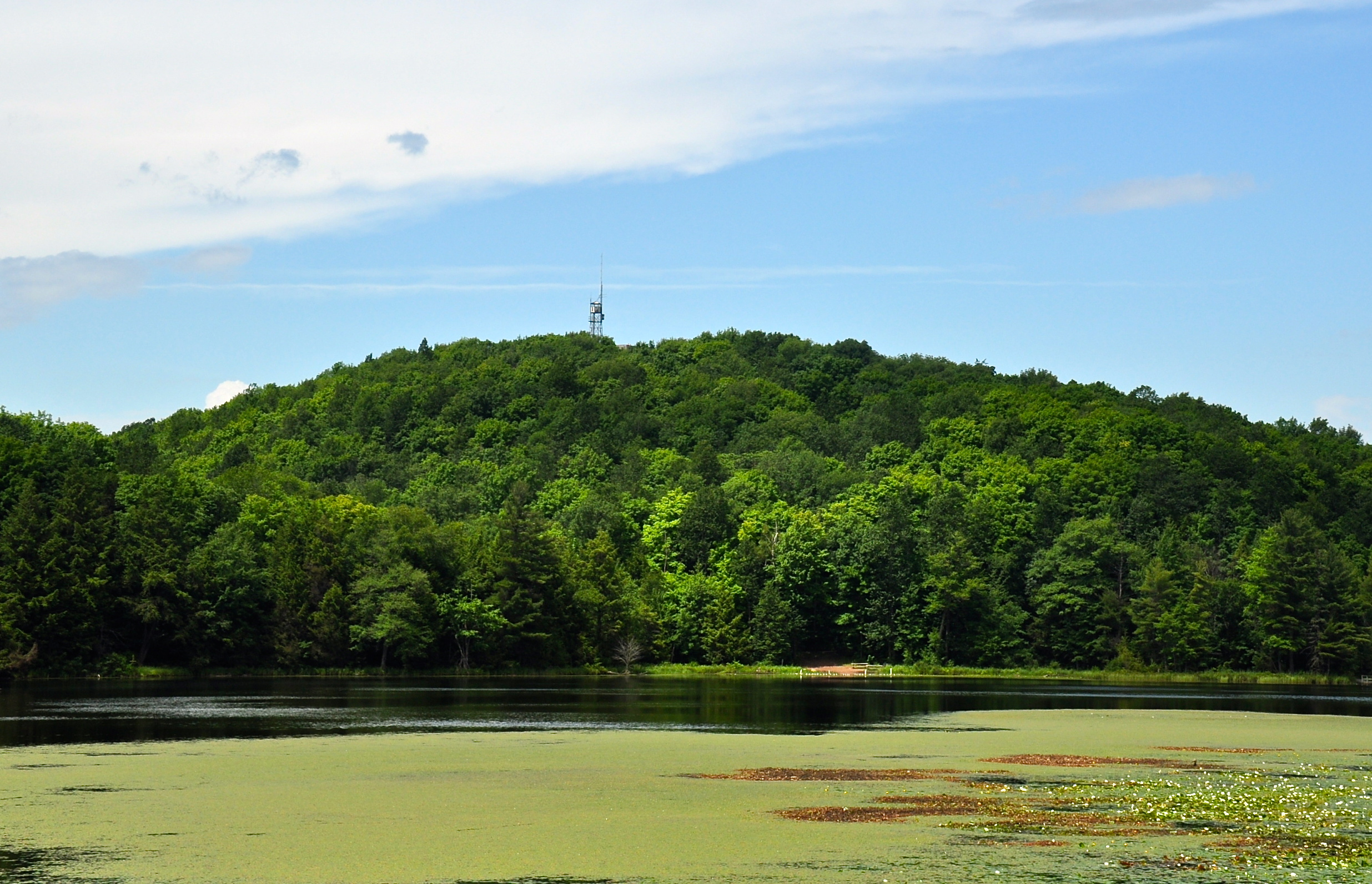
- Timms Hill, Wisconsin, July 2014.

Highest point
- Elevation: 1,951.5 ft (594.8 m)
- Prominence: 425 ft (130 m)
- Listing: U.S. state high point 39th
- Coordinates: 45°27′03″N 90°11′43″W

Geography
- Location within Wisconsin
- Location: Price County, Wisconsin, US
- Topo map: USGS Timms Hill

Climbing
- Easiest route: Hike

Timms Hill or Timm's Hill is the highest natural point in the U.S. state of Wisconsin and is located in north-central Wisconsin in Timms Hill County Park in the Town of Hill in Price County. After being surveyed by Quentin Stevens of Ogema Telephone Co in 1962, Timms Hill was discovered to have an elevation of 1,951.5 ft (595 m). It is less than 1 mile (1.6 km) south of Highway 86, about midway between Ogema and Spirit and about 23 miles (37 km) west of Tomahawk.

== Description ==
Timms Hill is located in Timms Hill County Park. A public lookout tower is atop the hill. Visible to the southeast is Rib Mountain (elev. 1,924 ft, 586 m), 44 miles (71 km) away by line of sight. The 10-mile (16 km) Timms Hill Trail connects to the Ice Age Trail, a National Scenic Trail stretching 1,200 miles (1,900 km) across glacial terrain in Wisconsin.

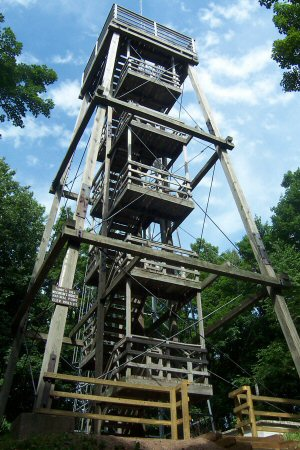
The tower at the top of Timms Hill.

== Climate ==
Climate data for Timms Hill 45.4497 N, 90.1974 W, Elevation: 1,837 ft (560 m) (1991–2020 normals)
| Month | Jan | Feb | Mar | Apr | May | Jun | Jul | Aug | Sep | Oct | Nov | Dec | Year |
|---|---|---|---|---|---|---|---|---|---|---|---|---|---|
| Mean daily maximum °F (°C) | 19.6 (−6.9) | 24.6 (−4.1) | 36.2 (2.3) | 49.5 (9.7) | 63.3 (17.4) | 72.3 (22.4) | 76.6 (24.8) | 74.3 (23.5) | 66.5 (19.2) | 52.2 (11.2) | 37.1 (2.8) | 24.7 (−4.1) | 49.7 (9.9) |
| Daily mean °F (°C) | 10.3 (−12.1) | 13.5 (−10.3) | 24.9 (−3.9) | 38.4 (3.6) | 52.0 (11.1) | 61.5 (16.4) | 65.9 (18.8) | 63.7 (17.6) | 56.1 (13.4) | 42.7 (5.9) | 29.5 (−1.4) | 16.8 (−8.4) | 39.6 (4.2) |
| Mean daily minimum °F (°C) | 1.0 (−17.2) | 2.5 (−16.4) | 13.7 (−10.2) | 27.3 (−2.6) | 40.7 (4.8) | 50.7 (10.4) | 55.2 (12.9) | 53.0 (11.7) | 45.8 (7.7) | 33.3 (0.7) | 21.8 (−5.7) | 8.9 (−12.8) | 29.5 (−1.4) |
| Average precipitation inches (mm) | 1.09 (28) | 1.03 (26) | 1.58 (40) | 2.77 (70) | 3.64 (92) | 4.48 (114) | 3.88 (99) | 3.90 (99) | 3.69 (94) | 3.18 (81) | 1.85 (47) | 1.41 (36) | 32.5 (826) |
Source: PRISM Climate Group

== See also ==
- List of U.S. states by elevation
