= William P. Gagin =

American politician (1916–1998)

William P. Gagin (November 6, 1916 in Illinois – July 28, 1998), was a member of the Wisconsin State Assembly. He was in the wholesale drugs and tool and dye business. He was married with three children.

== Career ==
Gagin was first elected to the Assembly in 1978. He was a Republican.
