= Cornell School District (Cornell, Wisconsin) =

School district in Wisconsin, United States

Coordinates: 45°09′56.9″N 91°08′32.5″W

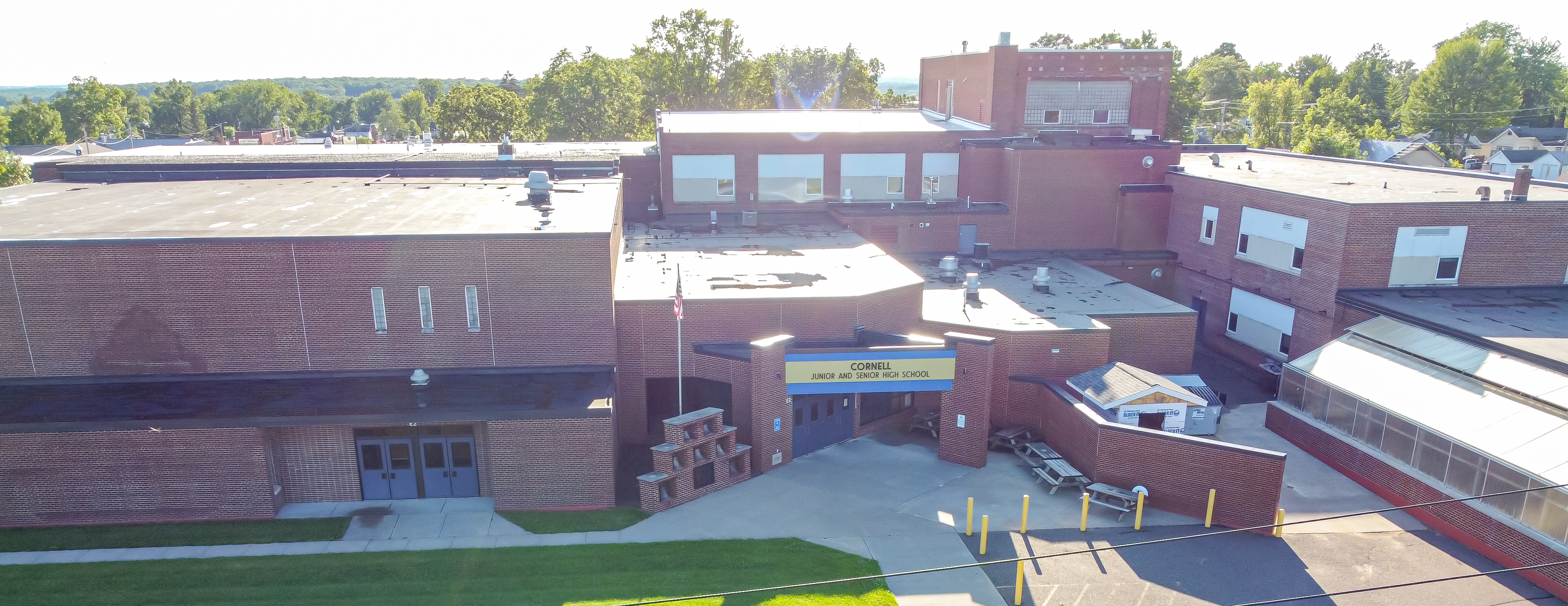
- High school and junior high school

Address
- 111 South 4th Street Cornell, Wisconsin, 54732; United States

District information
- Type: Public
- Grades: PreK–12
- NCES District ID: 5502880

Students and staff
- Students: 376
- Teachers: 27.09
- Staff: 26.39
- Student–teacher ratio: 13.88

Other information
- Website: www.cornell.k12.wi.us

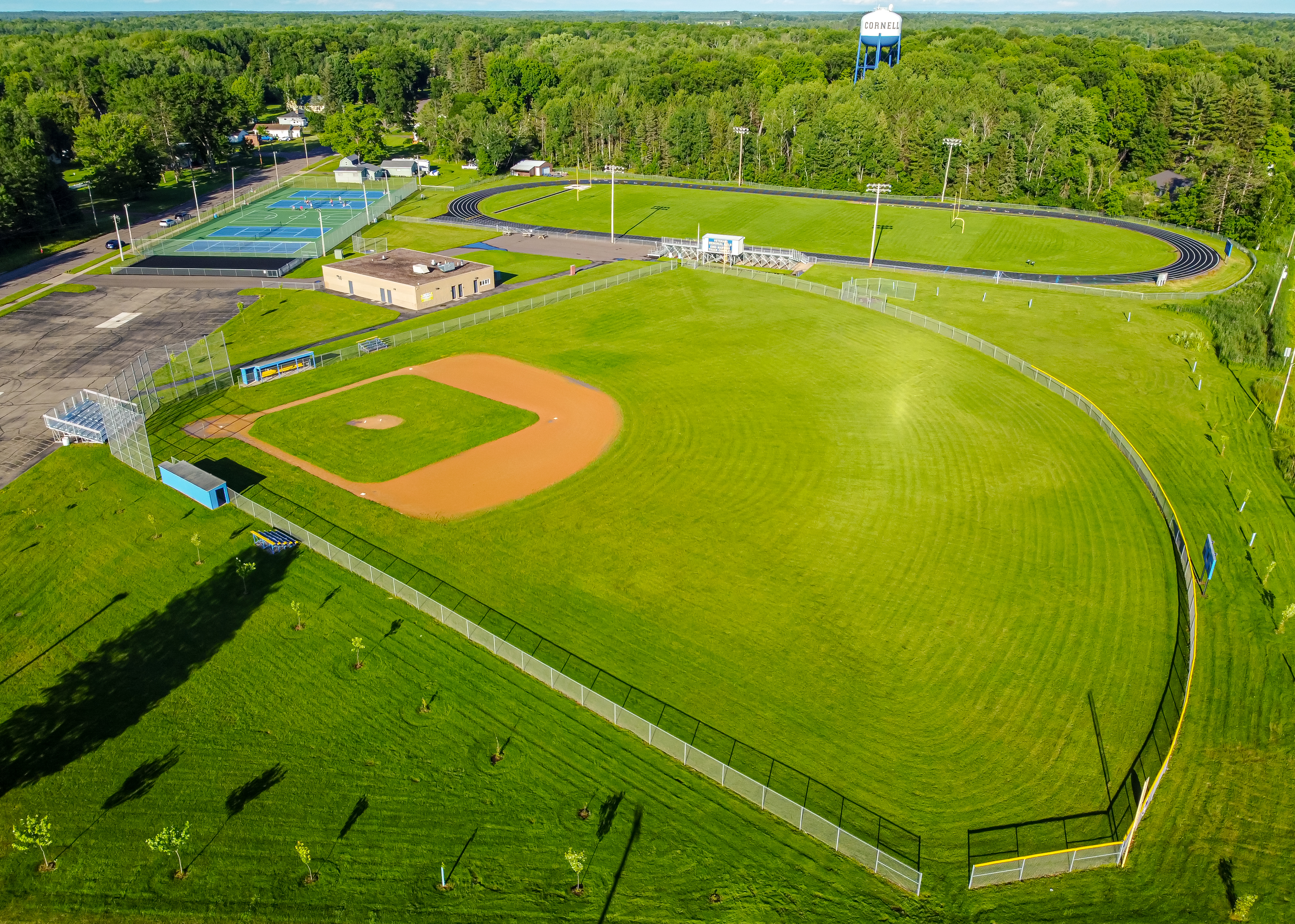
Athletic fields

The Cornell School District is a public school district in Cornell, Wisconsin.
