= Brunet Island State Park =

State park in Chippewa County, Wisconsin

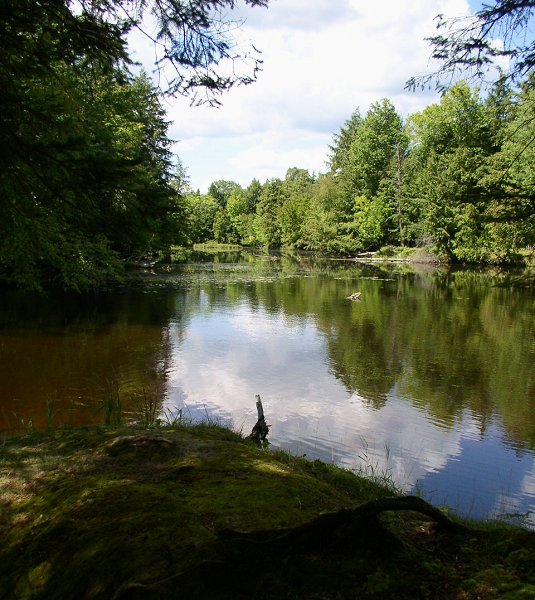

- Location within Wisconsin Location within the United States
- Interactive map of Brunet Island State Park
- Location: Chippewa County, Wisconsin, United States
- Coordinates: 45°10′45″N 91°9′59″W
- Area: 1,225 acres (496 ha)
- Elevation: 1,020 ft (310 m)
- Established: 1936
- Administrator: Wisconsin Department of Natural Resources
- Website: Official website

Brunet Island State Park (pronounced /ˈbruːneɪ/) is a state park of Wisconsin, United States, featuring a 169-acre (68 ha) island in the Chippewa River. The remainder of the park's 1,225 acres (496 ha) are on the east bank of the river. It is noted for its numerous white-tailed deer and large eastern hemlock trees. The park is located just north of Cornell in Chippewa County in the Northern Highland region of Wisconsin. The Old Abe State Trail begins in the park and follows the riverbank south to the town of Chippewa Falls, with access to Lake Wissota State Park.

== Natural history ==
Brunet Island is formed by the confluence of the Chippewa and Fisher Rivers. Backwater channels at the north end of the island create several undeveloped islets. The regional landscape was strongly marked by glaciation during the Wisconsin glaciation.

The park is forested with mature eastern hemlocks. Deer, overpopulated on the island, eat most of the young hemlocks. In time red pines and spruces may become dominant. Small fenced plots are scattered throughout the island to protect saplings and undergrowth from the deer. In 1977, a tornado touched down on the north-central part of the island, leveling 18 acres (7.3 ha). The tornado left so much debris that the park was closed until spring 1978 for cleanup. Today, this area is regenerating with birch trees.

== Cultural history ==
The park is named after Jean Brunet (1791–1877), an upper-class French immigrant who was instrumental in the development of the upper Chippewa River. He moved to St. Louis, Missouri in 1818 and found employment with a trading company. Two years later his employers stationed Brunet in Prairie du Chien, Wisconsin, where he became a leading citizen, married, and eventually went into business for himself. Brunet formed interests in the Chippewa River Valley and moved to Chippewa Falls in 1828. There he was engaged to oversee the construction of the first dam and sawmill on the Chippewa River, which opened the region up to logging. Brunet and his wife, who were childless, took a liking to Francis Gauthier, a boy who worked for him, and treated him as an adopted son for the rest of their lives. In 1837 and 1838 Brunet served on the Wisconsin Territory legislature. Shortly thereafter Brunet moved 25 miles (40 km) upriver where he settled permanently. He engaged in trade with native people and ran a popular inn. The city of Cornell was originally called Brunet Falls in his honor.

The state acquired Brunet Island in 1936 when it was donated by Northern States Power (now Xcel Energy). The Civilian Conservation Corps built a log shelter in 1938 as the park was developed, and Brunet Island State Park officially opened two years later.

== Recreation ==
- Bicycling: Allowed on park roads and Old Abe State Trail.
- Boating:
  - Ramp for power boats and fishing boats. Boaters can access a 4-mile (6.4 km) stretch of the Chippewa River between two dams.
  - Canoes can be rented from several outfitters in Cornell and Holcombe.
- Camping:
  - South Campground: 24 sites, all with electrical hookups.
  - North Campground: 45 primitive sites.
- Fishing: Game fish include northern pike, walleye, small mouth bass, catfish, crappie, muskie, and yellow perch. There are fishing piers near each campground.
- Hunting: Deer hunting allowed in northern two-thirds of mainland section.
- Sports: Playground and baseball diamond at the picnic area.
- Swimming: 200-foot (60 m) swimming beach on the south end of the island.
- Trails: 8 miles (13 km) of hiking trails and 5 miles (8 km) for cross-country skiing.
  - Jean Brunet Nature Trail (hiking): Interpretive trail starting near the bridge (0.8 mi or 1.3 km).
  - Timber Trail (hiking): Leads across the middle of the island from the campground to the beach.
  - Pine Trail (hiking): Leads through a plantation of red pine.
  - Spruce Trail (hiking): Leads along the eastern shore of the island.
  - Nordic Trail (hiking, skiing): Loops through the park section on the mainland.
