= Chuck Schafer =

American politician

Chuck Schafer (born September 10, 1963) is a former member of the Wisconsin State Assembly.

== Biography ==
Schafer was born on September 10, 1963, in Chippewa Falls, Wisconsin. He graduated from McDonell Central Catholic High School before attending Normandale Community College and American Flyers flight school and becoming a commercial pilot. Schafer is a member of Ducks Unlimited.

== Political career ==
Schafer was elected to the Assembly in 1996 as a Republican and was a member until 1998. He was succeeded by Larry Balow.
