= Cornell, Wisconsin =

- City
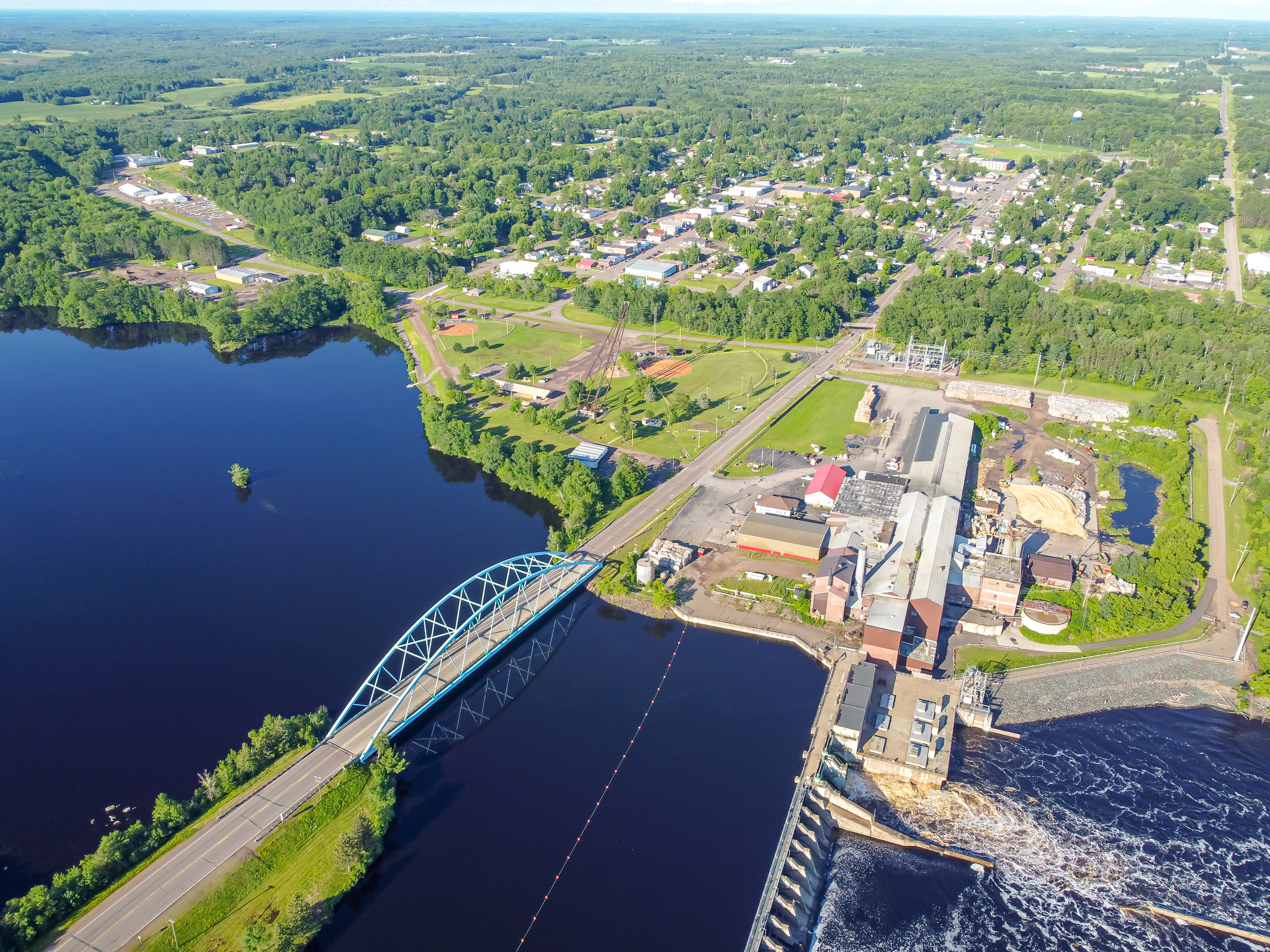
- Downtown Cornell

- Location of Cornell in Chippewa County, Wisconsin.

- Location within Wisconsin Location within the United States
- Coordinates: 45°10′0″N 91°8′59″W
- Country: United States
- State: Wisconsin
- County: Chippewa

Area
  - Total: 4.32 sq mi (11.19 km^{2})
  - Land: 3.79 sq mi (9.81 km^{2})
  - Water: 0.53 sq mi (1.38 km^{2})
- Elevation: 1,080 ft (330 m)

Population (2020)
  - Total: 1,453
  - Density: 384/sq mi (148/km^{2})
- Time zone: UTC-6 (Central (CST))
  - Summer (DST): UTC-5 (CDT)
- Area codes: 715 & 534
- FIPS code: 55-17100
- GNIS feature ID: 1563404
- Website: cityofcornell.com

Cornell is a city in Chippewa County, Wisconsin, United States. The population was 1,453 at the 2020 census, down from 1,467 at the 2010 census. It is located on the Chippewa River, upstream from Lake Wissota and Chippewa Falls, where Highway 64 crosses the river and Highway 27.

== History ==
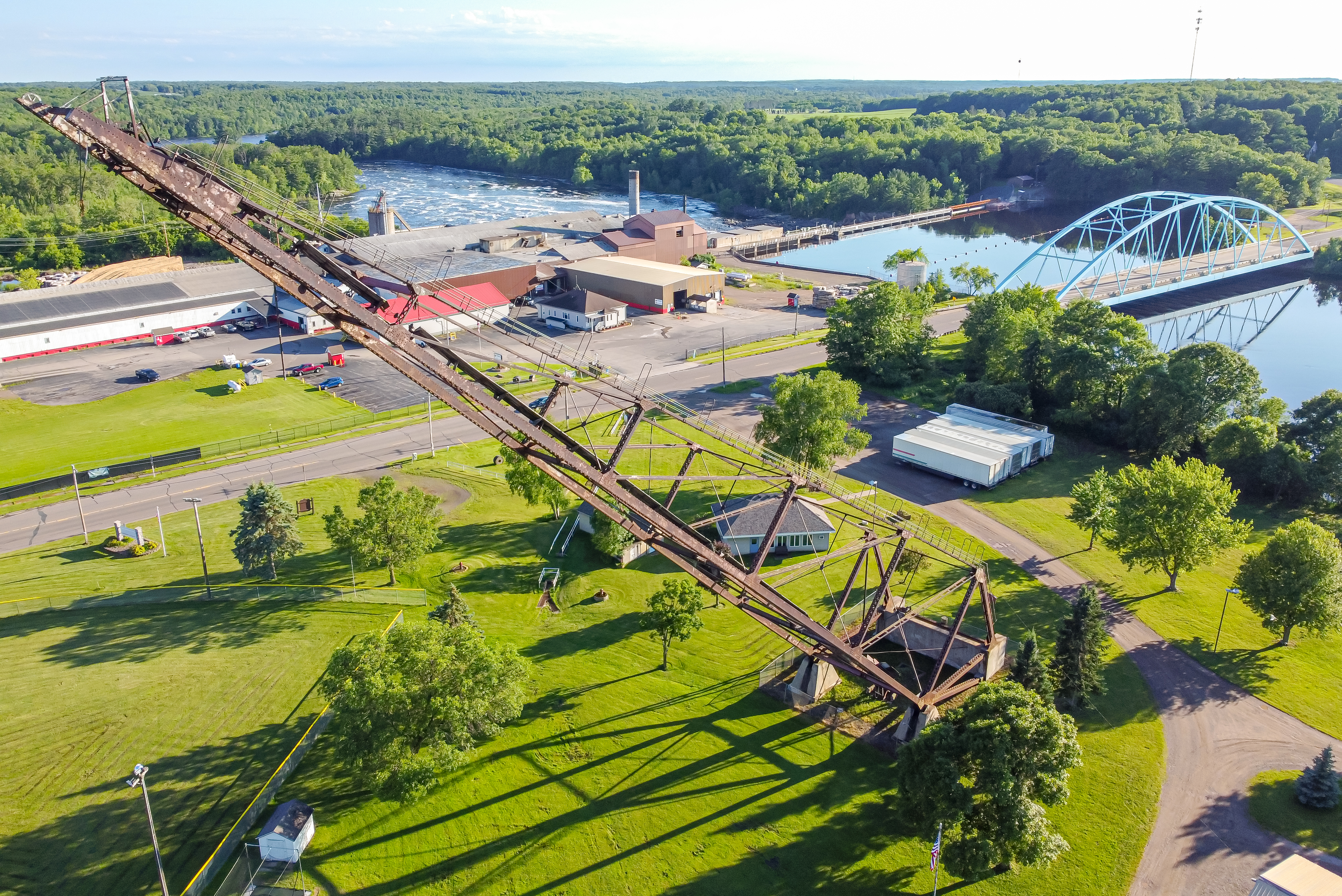
Cornell Pulpwood Stacker

The Cornell area was long visited by Sioux and Chippewa people passing up and down the Chippewa River.

The early white settlement was called Brunet Falls, named for Jean Brunet, who opened a trading post in the area in 1843. Brunet was a French-born American who served in the U.S. Army and led the building in 1836 of the first dam and sawmill in the then-wilderness at Chippewa Falls. After that he moved up the river another 30 miles and built a log cabin a mile below what would become Cornell on the west bank of the river. From his log cabin he ran a trading post that initially served Indians, and later grew into a stopping place (inn) for loggers and traders heading upriver.

The city was named for Ezra Cornell, one of the founders of Western Union, who owned a very large amount of timber land in the area. Upon his death in 1874, this land became a part of the endowment for the Ivy League university that bears his name.

Cornell has the U.S.'s only surviving pulpwood stacker, a huge device built next to the Chippewa River in 1911 to quickly and safely stack large quantities of pulpwood logs for storage until they could be processed in the paper mill nearby. The stacker has been unused since 1971, but is considered a historical treasure.

== Geography ==
Cornell is located at 45°09′55″N 91°08′57″W (45.165328, -91.149044).

According to the United States Census Bureau, the city has a total area of 4.37 square miles (11.32 km^{2}), of which 3.84 square miles (9.95 km^{2}) is land and 0.53 square miles (1.37 km^{2}) is water.

== Demographics ==
Historical population
Census	Pop.	Note	%±
1920	1,337		—
1930	1,510		12.9%
1940	1,759		16.5%
1950	1,944		10.5%
1960	1,685		−13.3%
1970	1,616		−4.1%
1980	1,578		−2.4%
1990	1,541		−2.3%
2000	1,466		−4.9%
2010	1,467		0.1%
2020	1,453		−1.0%
WI Counties 1900-1990

As of 2000 the median income for a household in the city was $30,690, and the median income for a family was $38,313. Males had a median income of $30,776 versus $19,808 for females. The per capita income for the city was $15,494. About 6.8% of families and 8.9% of the population were below the poverty line, including 10.1% of those under age 18 and 5.8% of those age 65 or over.

=== 2010 census ===
As of the census of 2010, there were 1,467 people, 607 households, and 400 families residing in the city. The population density was 382.0 inhabitants per square mile (147.5/km^{2}). There were 670 housing units at an average density of 174.5 per square mile (67.4/km^{2}). The racial makeup of the city was 97.6% White, 0.3% African American, 0.3% Native American, 0.2% Asian, 0.1% Pacific Islander, and 1.5% from two or more races. Hispanic or Latino of any race were 0.2% of the population.

There were 607 households, of which 27.7% had children under the age of 18 living with them, 48.9% were married couples living together, 11.7% had a female householder with no husband present, 5.3% had a male householder with no wife present, and 34.1% were non-families. 30.1% of all households were made up of individuals, and 16.9% had someone living alone who was 65 years of age or older. The average household size was 2.34 and the average family size was 2.84.

The median age in the city was 44 years. 22.4% of residents were under the age of 18; 7.4% were between the ages of 18 and 24; 21.7% were from 25 to 44; 26.3% were from 45 to 64; and 22.3% were 65 years of age or older. The gender makeup of the city was 48.6% male and 51.4% female.

== Transportation ==
Cornell Municipal Airport (4WI9, formerly 2H3) serves the city and surrounding communities.

== Education ==
Cornell School District
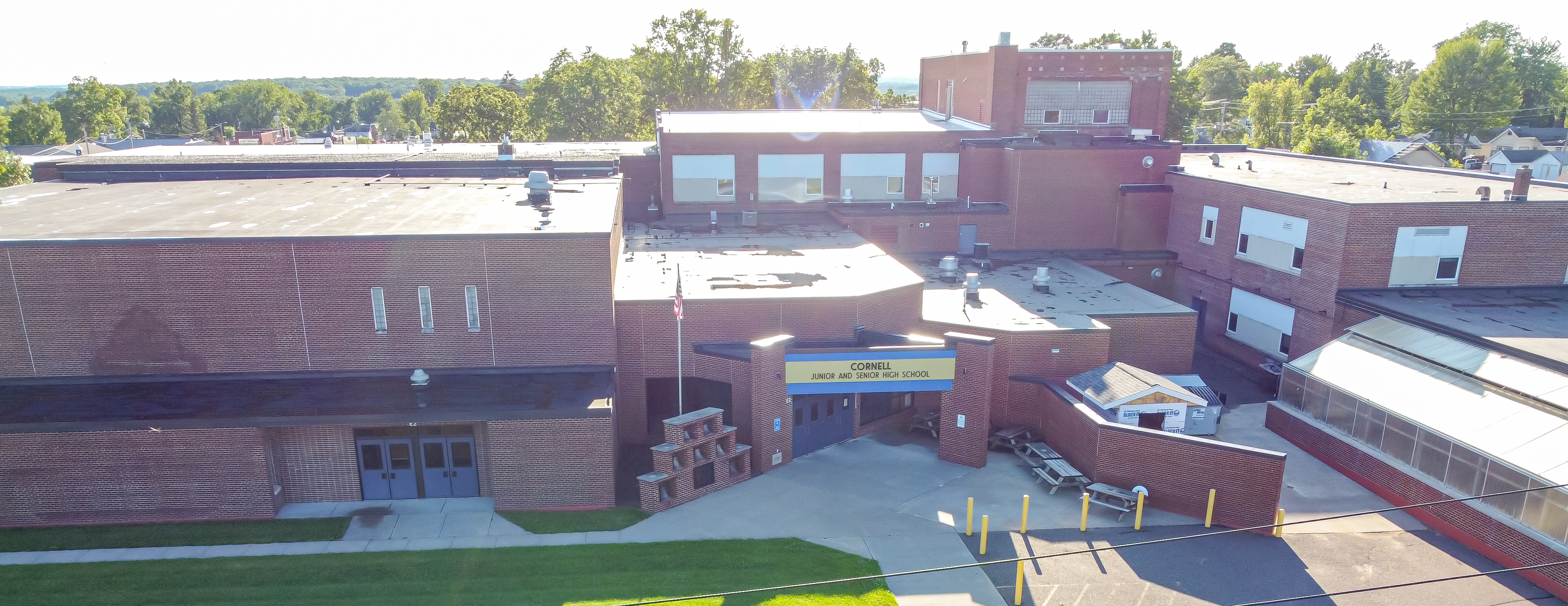
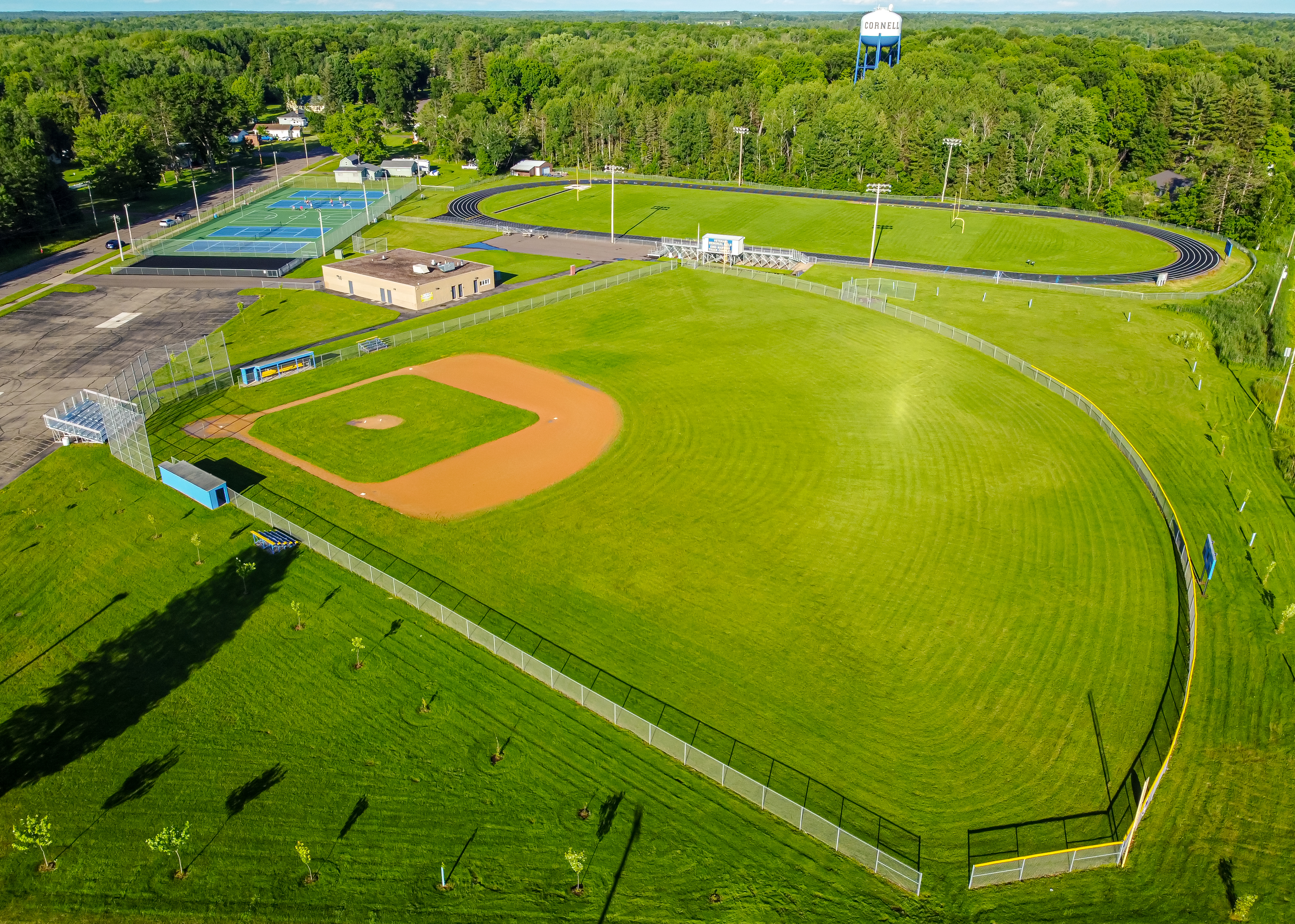

Cornell is served by the Cornell School District.

== Attractions ==
Brunet Island State Park is adjacent to the city. The northern trailhead for the Old Abe State Trail, a paved rail-trail, is located downtown.

Cornell has the world's only surviving pulpwood stacker. The stacker helped to launch the huge timber industry in the Northwoods of Wisconsin in the late 19th century and early 20th century. It was used to move large quantities of pulpwood logs, making the process of stacking wood faster, safer, and easier. The stacker has been unused since 1972, but is considered a historical treasure. An annual town fair, known as the Stacker Festival, continues today.

== See also ==
- List of cities in Wisconsin
