= David Plombon =

American politician

David Plombon was a former member of the Wisconsin State Assembly.

== Biography ==
Plombon was born on May 27, 1961, in Stanley, Wisconsin. He attended the University of Wisconsin–Eau Claire and Milwaukee Area Technical College. Plombon had two children.

Plombon died on January 4, 2021.

== Career ==
Plombon was elected to the Assembly in a special election in June 1993. He was a Democrat. In that election, he defeated Wayne Laufenberg by 261 votes (4,161 to 3,900).

In the 1994 general election, Plombon again defeated Laufenberg, this time by a margin of 533 votes (7,750 to 7,217).

Plombon was arrested on March 30, 1994, and charged with misdemeanor disorderly conduct after his ex-wife reported to police that he rammed his car into the back of her car, called her vulgar names and threatened to kill her.

Whereas, Representative David Plombon was jailed in June 1995 for allegedly violating conditions of probation stemming from a previous conviction for marijuana possession; and Whereas, Representative Plombon requested his probation be revoked and he was resentenced in July 1995 for misdemeanor possession of marijuana; and Whereas, Representative Plombon was sentenced to 16 days in jail which was satisfied by 12 days time served and 4 days credit for good behavior; and Whereas, Representative Plombon was arrested after failing a drug test ordered by his probation officer in December 1994; and Whereas, Representative Plombon pled no contest to misdemeanor possession of marijuana and was sentenced to 18 months probation and $1,812 in fines and court costs; and Whereas, Representative Plombon was convicted in 1994 of OWI; and Whereas, Representative Plombon pled no contest to misdemeanor disorderly conduct in May 1994 stemming from an incident involving his car and estranged wife; and Whereas, Representative Plombon was sentenced to one year probation and ordered to undergo assessment for chemical dependency;

In the 1996 general election, Chuck Schaefer defeated Plombon by 1,252 votes (11,010 to 9,758)
