= Joseph Looby =

American politician

Joseph Looby (November 24, 1917 – January 26, 2001) was an American Democratic legislator, labor union official, and factory worker.

Born in Eau Claire, Wisconsin, Looby served in the United States Army during World War II and was a Roman Catholic. He worked at the United States Rubber Company and was involved in the labor union. He served on the Eau Claire Common Council and the Eau Claire County Board of Supervisors. He also served in the Wisconsin State Assembly from 1969 to 1979 and from 1981 to 1989.

== Electoral history ==
Wisconsin State Assembly Election, 1972:

- Joseph Looby (D) - 12,599 (59.05%)
- Dave Duax (R) - 8,730 (40.93%)
