= Eagle Point =

Eagle Point may refer to:

== Places ==
United States

- Eagle Point, Alabama
- Eagle Point, Oklahoma
- Eagle Point, Oregon,
- Eagle Point, Berks County, Pennsylvania
- Eagle Point, Lehigh County, Pennsylvania
- Eagle Point, Wisconsin, a town
  - Eagle Point (community), Wisconsin, an unincorporated community

Australia

- Eagle Point, Victoria, a town

Fictional

- American Gods

== See also ==
United States

- Eagle Point Park, Dubuque, Iowa
- Eagle Point Park, Pasco County Florida
- Eagle Point (Olympic Mountains)
- Eagle's Point, an album by Chris Potter
