= Arthur, Wisconsin =

- Town
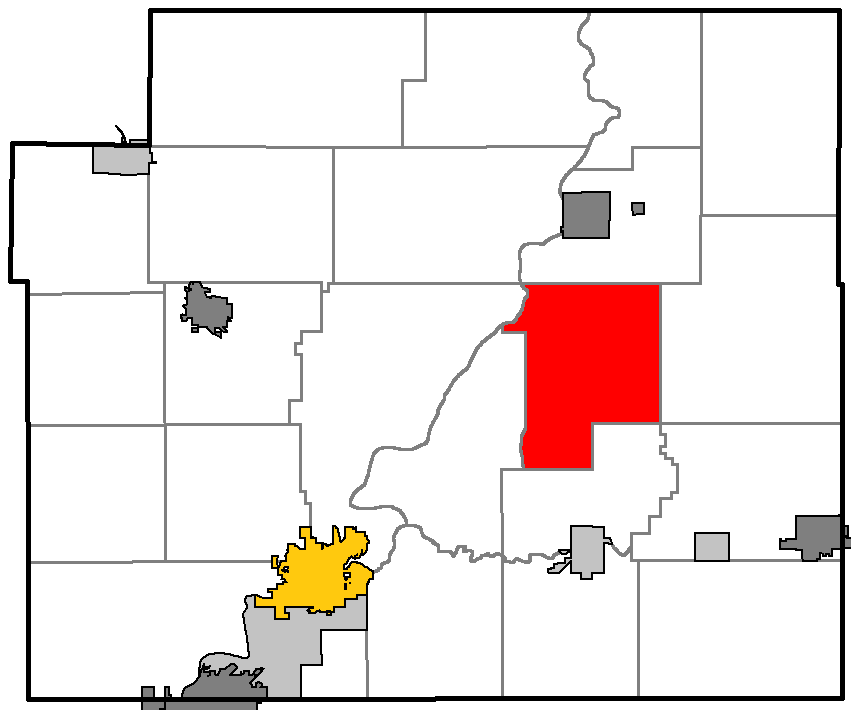
- Location of Arthur within Chippewa County

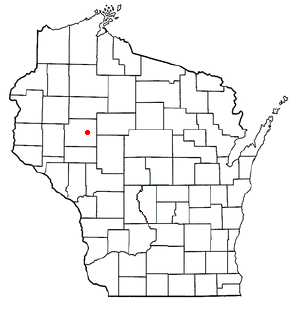
- Location of Arthur, Wisconsin
- Coordinates: 45°4′18″N 91°9′18″W
- Country: United States
- State: Wisconsin
- County: Chippewa

Area
  - Total: 43.1 sq mi (111.5 km^{2})
  - Land: 42.9 sq mi (111.1 km^{2})
  - Water: 0.19 sq mi (0.5 km^{2})
- Elevation: 1,096 ft (334 m)

Population (2020)
  - Total: 771
  - Density: 18.0/sq mi (6.94/km^{2})
- Time zone: UTC-6 (Central (CST))
  - Summer (DST): UTC-5 (CDT)
- Area codes: 715 & 534
- FIPS code: 55-03075
- GNIS feature ID: 1582720
- PLSS townships: Most of T30N R6W, part of T30N R7W, and bits of T29N R6W and T29N R7W
- Website: https://www.townofarthur.com/

Arthur is a town in Chippewa County in the U.S. state of Wisconsin. The population was 771 at the 2020 census. The unincorporated communities of Cobban, Crescent, and Drywood are located in the town.

== Education ==
The town is served by the School District of Cadott Community and the Cornell School District.

== History ==
The outlines of the 6-mile squares that would become Arthur were first surveyed in 1848 by a crew working for the U.S. government. In 1849 a different crew marked the section corners of the township, walking through the woods and swamps, measuring with chain and compass. When done, the deputy surveyor filed this general description of the 6-by-6-mile (9.7 by 9.7 km) square which became the east half of Arthur and the west part of Colburn:

The Surface in this Township is generally level, the Soil cold and wet. In the Northern part there is a considerable quantity of good Pine timber. The currents of the two principal Streams in the South and West are swift - and rocky bottoms - the banks low, and Subject to frequent overflows. But a Small portion of the Township adapted to farming or grazing. It is heavily timbered with Birch, Sugar, Pine, Ash Oak & e. There is a Small Lake in the Eastern part of the Township, the shores of which are low and marshy the water clear and bottom gravel.

A different crew, surveying the 6-mile (9.7 km) square that includes the west end of today's town of Arthur, found some settlers:

There are six dwelling Houses in this Township, one on the N.W. 1/4 of the NW. 1/4 of Section 2 One on the S.W. 1/4 of NW. 1/4 of Section 2 belonging to Daniel McCan.

Founded January 27, 1885, the town was named after Chester A. Arthur, the 21st president of the United States. It was created from the towns of Anson and Sigel. Arthur's first town chairman was H.P. Buchanan who held office until 1890.

== Geography ==
The town is in east-central Chippewa County and is bordered on its northwestern corner by the Chippewa River. According to the United States Census Bureau, the town has a total area of 43.1 square miles (111.5 km^{2}), of which 42.9 square miles (111.1 km^{2}) is land and 0.19 square miles (0.5 km^{2}), or 0.42%, is water.

== Demographics ==
Historical population
Census	Pop.	Note	%±
1990	756		—
2000	710		−6.1%
2010	759		6.9%
2020	771		1.6%

As of the census of 2000, there were 710 people, 258 households, and 192 families residing in the town. The population density was 16.5 people per square mile (6.4/km^{2}). There were 275 housing units at an average density of 6.4 per square mile (2.5/km^{2}). The racial makeup of the town was 98.73% White, 0.14% African American, and 1.13% from two or more races. Hispanic or Latino of any race were 0.42% of the population.

There were 258 households, out of which 38.4% had children under the age of 18 living with them, 63.6% were married couples living together, 5.4% had a female householder with no husband present, and 25.2% were non-families. 21.3% of all households were made up of individuals, and 10.9% had someone living alone who was 65 years of age or older. The average household size was 2.75 and the average family size was 3.22.

In the town, the population was spread out, with 28.6% under the age of 18, 5.9% from 18 to 24, 30.4% from 25 to 44, 23.4% from 45 to 64, and 11.7% who were 65 years of age or older. The median age was 37 years. For every 100 females, there were 114.5 males. For every 100 females age 18 and over, there were 109.5 males.

The median income for a household in the town was $40,000, and the median income for a family was $44,464. Males had a median income of $25,446 versus $21,830 for females. The per capita income for the town was $15,570. About 13.9% of families and 13.4% of the population were below the poverty line, including 17.3% of those under age 18 and 11.5% of those age 65 or over.
