= Eagle Point, Pennsylvania =

Eagle Point may refer to either of two communities in the U.S. state of Pennsylvania:

- Eagle Point, Berks County, Pennsylvania
- Eagle Point, Lehigh County, Pennsylvania
