= Cobban =

Cobban may refer to:

- Cobban, Wisconsin, unincorporated community, United States

People with the surname:

- Alfred Cobban (1901–1968), British historian
- Helena Cobban (born 1952), British writer and researcher on international relations
- James Cobban (politician) (1870–1934)
- James Cobban (1910–1999), British educator
