= Lake Wissota =

Reservoir in Chippewa County, Wisconsin, United States

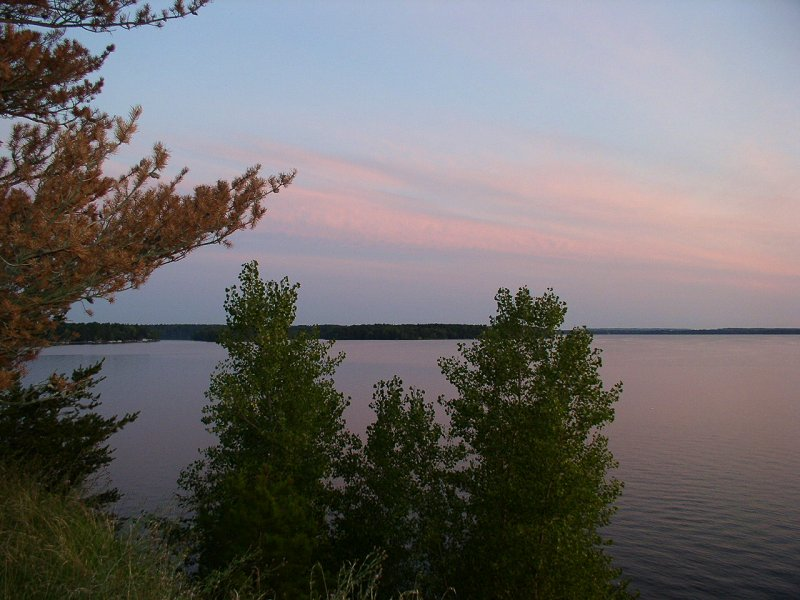
- from the northeast shore at sunset

- Location within Wisconsin
- Location: Chippewa County, Wisconsin, United States
- Coordinates: 44.94663°N 91.32654°W
- Lake type: Reservoir
- Primary inflows: Chippewa River, Paint Creek, Stillson Creek, Yellow River, O'Neil Creek
- Primary outflows: Chippewa River
- Basin countries: United States
- Surface area: 6,024 acres (2,438 ha)
- Max. depth: 72 ft (22 m)
- Surface elevation: 899 ft (274 m)
- Settlements: Lafayette, Anson, Eagle Point

Lake Wissota is a reservoir in Chippewa County, Wisconsin, United States, just east of the city of Chippewa Falls. It covers an area of 6,024 acres (2,438 ha) and has a maximum depth of 72 feet (22 m).

Lake Wissota is surrounded on the south by the town of Lafayette, on the north and east by the town of Anson, and on the west by the town of Eagle Point.

The lake is divided into two parts by the Highway X bridge and a railroad bridge which run parallel to each other. The smaller southern portion of the lake, the flooded portion of the valley formed by Paint Creek, is often called "Little Lake Wissota". The larger portion of the lake, lying to the north of Lake Wissota Village, is usually just called "Lake Wissota", although it is sometimes also called "Big Lake Wissota". The lake is fed by several other rivers and streams besides the Chippewa River, which enters the lake from the northwest and exits to the southwest, and Paint Creek which enters Little Lake Wissota from the east, respectively. These include Stillson Creek, which enters Little Lake Wissota from the southwest, the Yellow River which enters from the east at Moon Bay, and O'Neil Creek, which enters in the northwest, near the entrance of the Chippewa River.

The lake is a popular recreation destination in northwestern Wisconsin, in the summer for boating, canoeing, fishing, water skiing, and swimming, and in the winter for ice fishing. On the northeastern shore lies Lake Wissota State Park, popular with campers, hikers, swimmers, and anglers.

In popular culture, Lake Wissota is mentioned in the film Titanic. One of the film's main protagonists, Jack Dawson (played by Leonardo DiCaprio), states that he and his father would go ice fishing on Lake Wissota. However, Lake Wissota was not created until five years after the RMS Titanic sank.

== Wissota Hydroelectric Dam ==
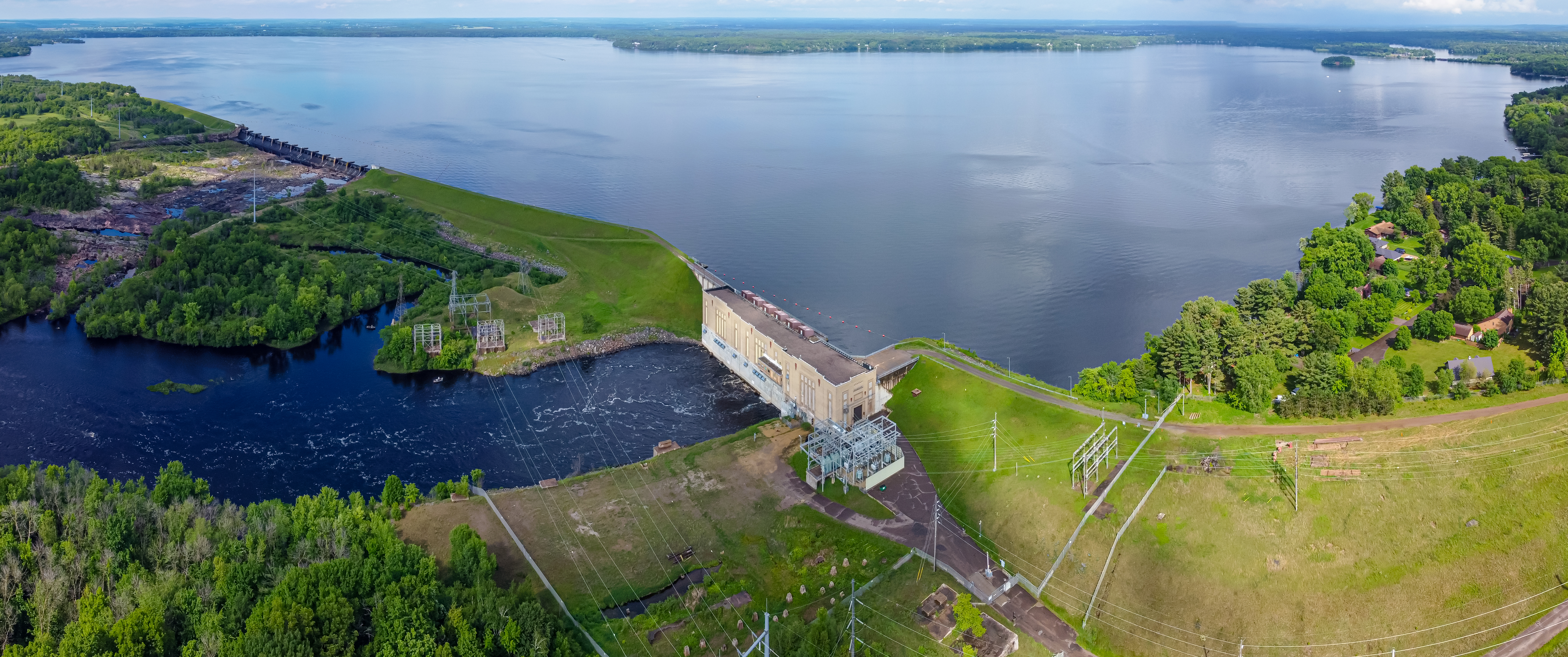
Lake Wissota and Hydroelectric dam

The lake was formed by the construction of the Wissota Hydroelectric Dam on the Chippewa River, completed in 1917. The dam was built by the Wisconsin-Minnesota Light and Power Company. An engineer on the project, Louis G. Arnold, named the lake by combining the beginning of "Wisconsin" and the ending of "Minnesota". The dam is now owned and operated by Xcel Energy, and is capable of producing 36 megawatts.
