= Anson (community), Wisconsin =

Anson, Wisconsin
- Unincorporated community
- Location within Wisconsin Location within the United States
- Coordinates: 44°58′51″N 91°17′13″W
- Country: United States
- State: Wisconsin
- County: Chippewa
- Town: Anson
- Elevation: 948 ft (289 m)
- Time zone: UTC-6 (Central (CST))
  - Summer (DST): UTC-5 (CDT)
- Area codes: 715 & 534
- GNIS feature ID: 1560886

Anson is an unincorporated community located in the town of Anson, Chippewa County, Wisconsin, United States.

== History ==
A post office called Anson was established in 1895, and remained in operation until it was discontinued in 1901. The community was named for Anson Burlingame.
