= Ingolf E. Rasmus =

American lawyer and politician (1906–1996)

Ingolf E. Rasmus (July 4, 1906 – July 20, 1996) was an American lawyer and politician.

Born in the Town of Eagle Point, Wisconsin, Chippewa County, Wisconsin, Rasmus went to Ripon College and then received his law degree from the University of Wisconsin Law School and then practiced law in Chippewa Falls, Wisconsin. In 1931, Rasmus served in the Wisconsin State Assembly and was a Republican.
