= Edson, Wisconsin =

Town of Edson
- Town
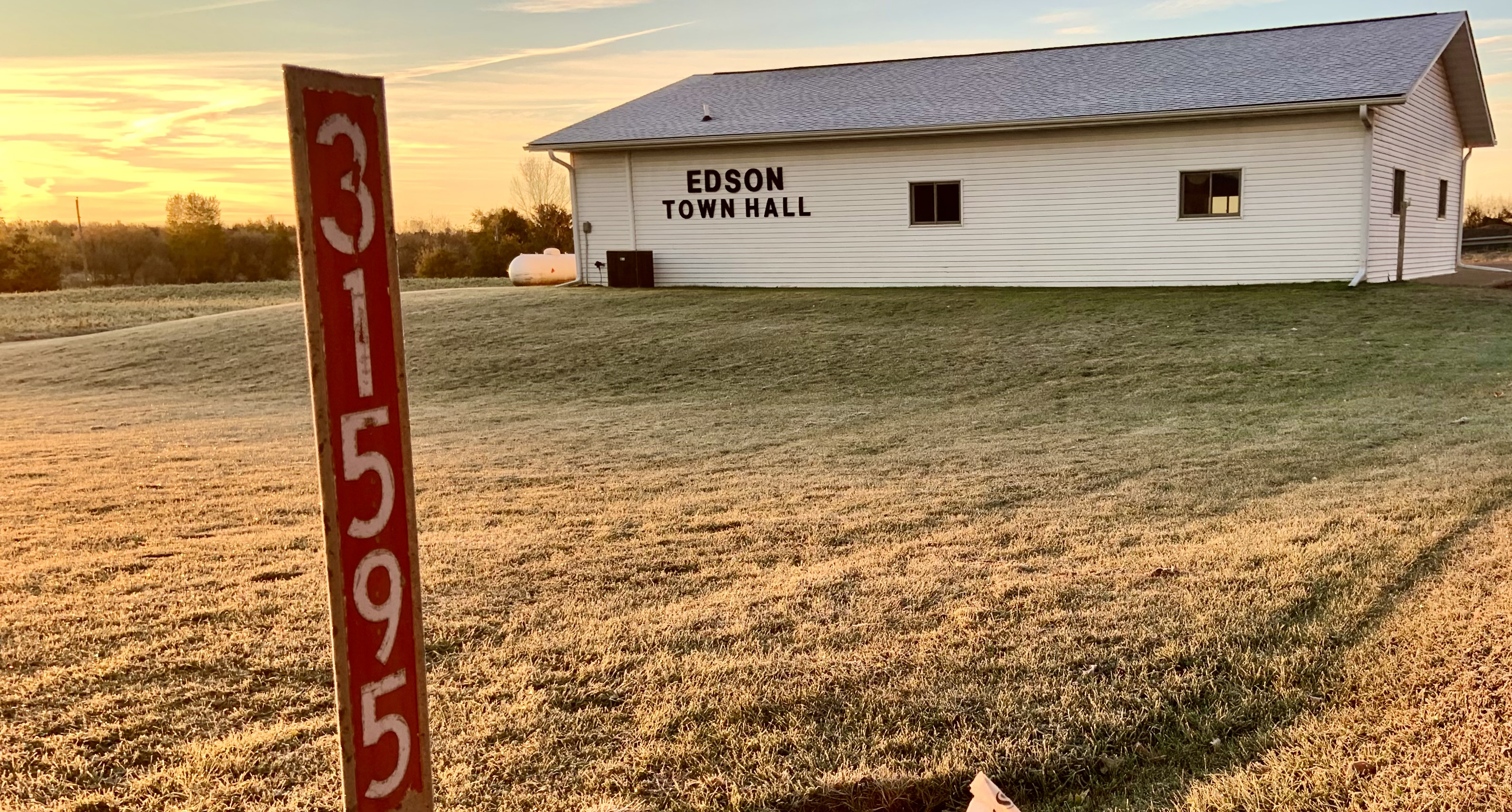
- Town hall

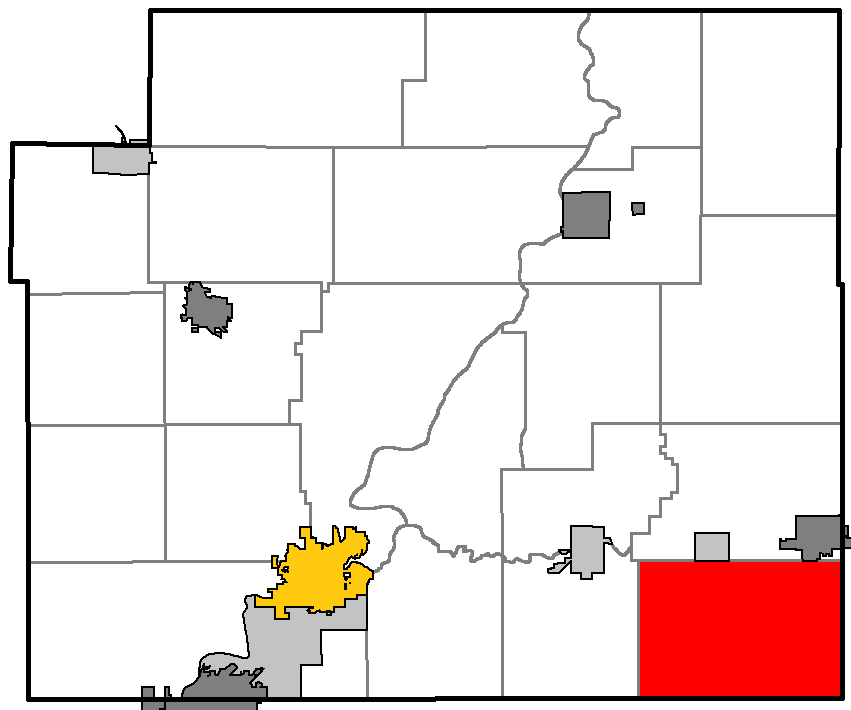
- Location of Edson within Chippewa County

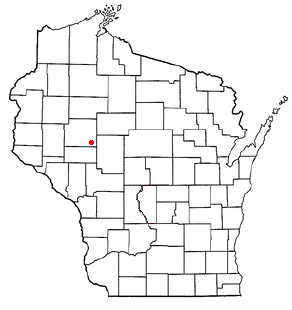
- Location of the Town of Edson
- Coordinates: 44°55′27″N 91°0′23″W
- Country: United States
- State: Wisconsin
- County: Chippewa

Area
  - Total: 54.0 sq mi (139.8 km^{2})
  - Land: 53.9 sq mi (139.7 km^{2})
  - Water: 0.039 sq mi (0.1 km^{2})
- Elevation: 1,056 ft (322 m)

Population (2020)
  - Total: 1,141
  - Density: 21.15/sq mi (8.168/km^{2})
- Time zone: UTC-6 (Central (CST))
  - Summer (DST): UTC-5 (CDT)
- Area codes: 715 & 534
- FIPS code: 55-22750
- GNIS feature ID: 1583135
- PLSS township: T28N R5W and east half of T28N R6W

The Town of Edson is located in Chippewa County in the U.S. state of Wisconsin. The population was 1,141 at the 2020 census, up from 1,089 at the 2010 census.

== History ==
The outlines of the 6-mile squares that would become the Town of Edson were first surveyed in the fall of 1848 by crews working for the U.S. government. In September 1853 another crew marked all the section corners of the eastern six by six square, walking the woods and swamps on foot, measuring with chain and compass. When done, the deputy surveyor filed this general description:

This Township contains but few Swamps has a Surface but slightly rolling with a good Soil & excellent timber throughout the whole Township. The Streams are Small except one in the NW of the Township which has(?) Marshy banks & sluggish current, & also a stream passing through the Eastern portions of Sections 1, 12, 25 & 36. There are no improvements in the Township except a lumberman's Cabin near the Center of Section 36.

== Geography ==
The Town of Edson is located in the southeast corner of Chippewa County and is bordered by Clark County to the east, Eau Claire County to the south, and the Town of Sigel to the west. The town has the shape of a rectangle, 9 miles (14 km) east to west and 6 miles (10 km) north to south. According to the United States Census Bureau, the town has a total area of 54.0 square miles (139.8 km^{2}), of which 53.9 square miles (139.7 km^{2}) is land and 0.04 square miles (0.1 km^{2}), or 0.09%, is water.

== Demographics ==
Historical population
Census	Pop.	Note	%±
1990	913		—
2000	966		5.8%
2010	1,089		12.7%
2020	1,141		4.8%

As of the census of 2000, there were 966 people, 309 households, and 259 families residing in the town. The population density was 17.9 people per square mile (6.9/km^{2}). There were 322 housing units at an average density of 6.0 per square mile (2.3/km^{2}). The racial makeup of the town was 98.14% White, 0.10% Asian, and 1.76% from two or more races. Hispanic or Latino of any race were 0.72% of the population.

There were 309 households, out of which 46.3% had children under the age of 18 living with them, 66.3% were married couples living together, 11.3% had a female householder with no husband present, and 15.9% were non-families. 13.9% of all households were made up of individuals, and 5.2% had someone living alone who was 65 years of age or older. The average household size was 3.13 and the average family size was 3.38.

The population distribution was 33.6% under the age of 18, 8.1% from 18 to 24, 26.7% from 25 to 44, 21.9% from 45 to 64, and 9.6% who were 65 years of age or older. The median age was 33 years. For every 100 females, there were 103 males. For every 100 females age 18 and over, there were 98 males.

The median income for a household in the town was $34,722, and the median income for a family was $36,563. Males had a median income of $22,014 versus $20,885 for females. The per capita income for the town was $12,154. About 20.1% of families and 24.1% of the population were below the poverty line, including 33.5% of those under age 18 and 12.5% of those age 65 or over.

== Education ==
The town is served by the School District of Cadott Community and the Stanley-Boyd Area School District.
