= Eagle Point, Wisconsin =

- Town
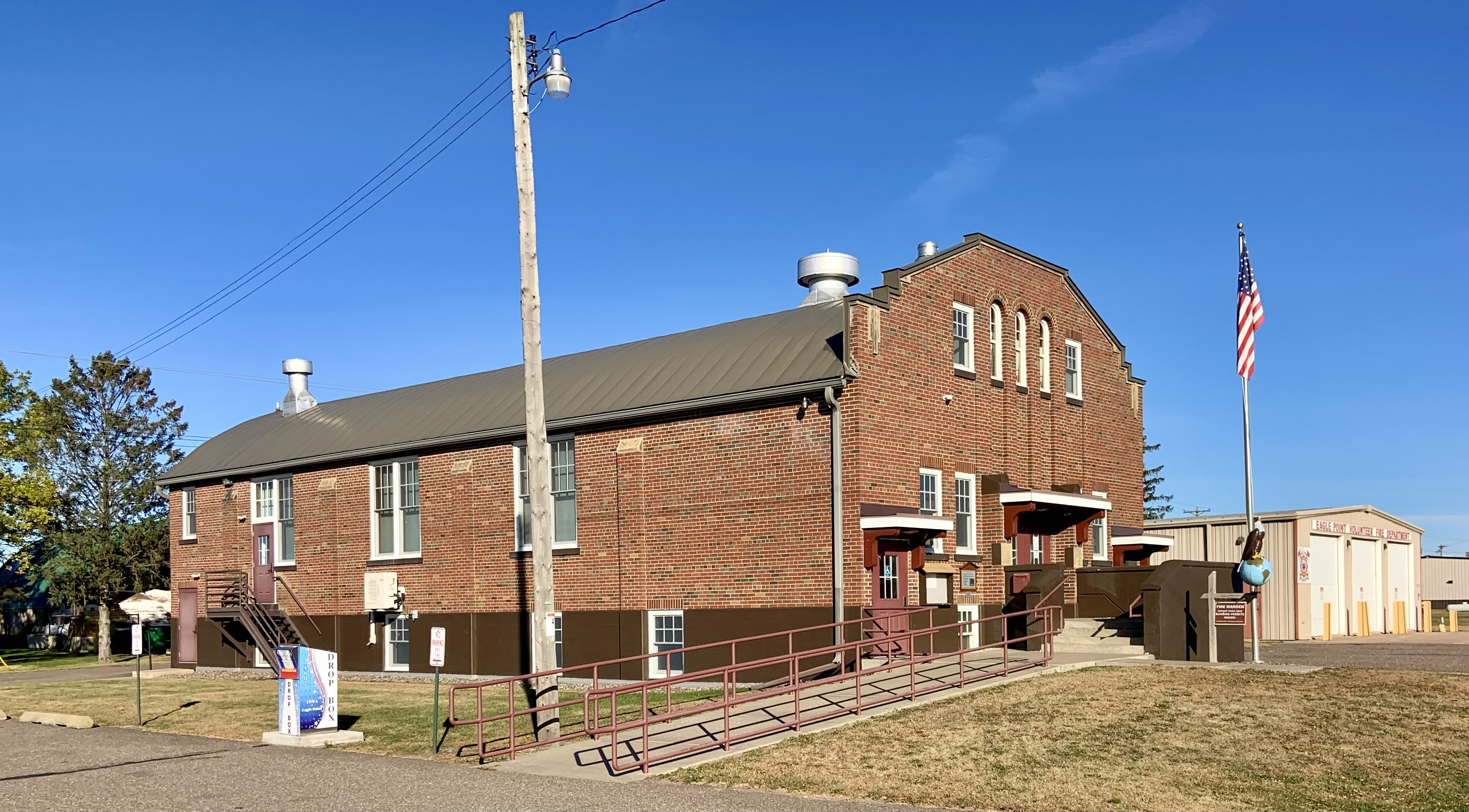
- Town hall

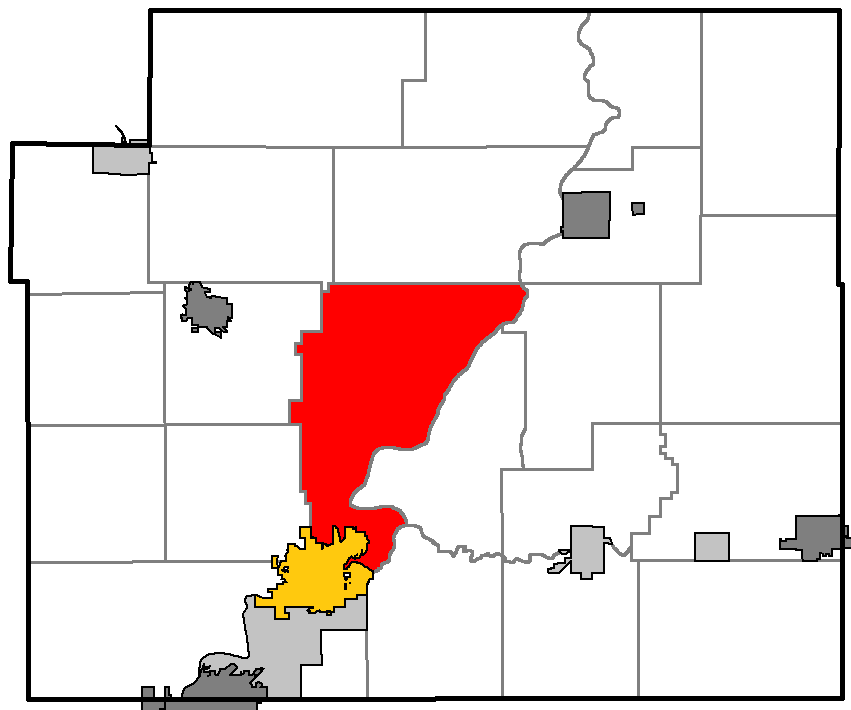
- Location of Eagle Point, within Chippewa County, Wisconsin

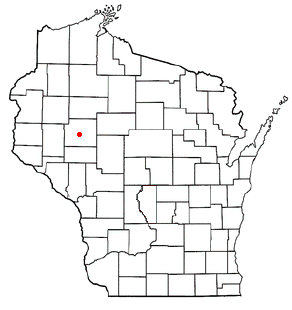
- Location of Eagle Point, Wisconsin
- Coordinates: 45°1′14″N 91°21′30″W
- Country: United States
- State: Wisconsin
- County: Chippewa

Area
  - Total: 66.3 sq mi (171.6 km^{2})
  - Land: 60.9 sq mi (157.7 km^{2})
  - Water: 5.4 sq mi (13.9 km^{2})
- Elevation: 1,122 ft (342 m)

Population (2020)
  - Total: 3,237
  - Density: 53.16/sq mi (20.53/km^{2})
- Time zone: UTC-6 (Central (CST))
  - Summer (DST): UTC-5 (CDT)
- Area codes: 715 & 534
- FIPS code: 55-21600
- GNIS feature ID: 1583113
- PLSS township: Most of T30N R8W, and western parts of T30N R7W and T29N R8W
- Website: www.townofeaglepointchippewa.com

Eagle Point is a town in Chippewa County in the U.S. state of Wisconsin. The population was 3,237 at the 2020 census. The unincorporated communities of Eagle Point and Eagleton are located in the town.

== Geography ==
The town of Eagle Point is located in central Chippewa County and is bordered to the south by the city of Chippewa Falls. The southward-flowing Chippewa River forms the eastern border of the town, impounded into two reservoirs: Old Abe Lake in the north and Lake Wissota in the south. The dams forming Old Abe Lake are just upstream from the unincorporated community of Jim Falls, across the river to the east in the town of Anson.

According to the United States Census Bureau, the town of Eagle Point has a total area of 66.3 square miles (171.6 km^{2}), of which 60.9 square miles (157.7 km^{2}) is land and 5.4 square miles (13.9 km^{2}), or 8.10%, is water.

== Demographics ==
Historical population
Census	Pop.	Note	%±
1990	2,542		—
2000	3,049		19.9%
2010	3,053		0.1%
2020	3,237		6.0%

As of the census of 2000, there were 3,049 people, 978 households, and 820 families residing in the town. The population density was 49.7 people per square mile (19.2/km^{2}). There were 1,018 housing units at an average density of 16.6 per square mile (6.4/km^{2}). The racial makeup of the town was 99.02% White, 0.03% African American, 0.20% Native American, 0.39% Asian, and 0.36% from two or more races. Hispanic or Latino of any race were 0.16% of the population.

There were 978 households, out of which 38.5% had children under the age of 18 living with them, 75.1% were married couples living together, 5.7% had a female householder with no husband present, and 16.1% were non-families. 12.6% of all households were made up of individuals, and 5.5% had someone living alone who was 65 years of age or older. The average household size was 2.77 and the average family size was 3.01.

In the town, the population was spread out, with 24.1% under the age of 18, 5.5% from 18 to 24, 25.9% from 25 to 44, 25.6% from 45 to 64, and 18.9% who were 65 years of age or older. The median age was 42 years. For every 100 females, there were 99.5 males. For every 100 females age 18 and over, there were 98.2 males.

The median income for a household in the town was $54,250, and the median income for a family was $56,250. Males had a median income of $35,473 versus $24,922 for females. The per capita income for the town was $19,421. About 3.7% of families and 5.7% of the population were below the poverty line, including 5.4% of those under age 18 and 8.9% of those age 65 or over.

== History ==
The first settlers in this area settled along the Chippewa River. In 1848, when the first surveyors passed through for the U.S. government, they found few "improvements" in the land away from the river, but along the river they noted a number of settlers in what would become the town of Eagle Point. For the 6-mile (10 km) square that includes the part of Eagle Point below modern Jim Falls, the surveyor wrote this general description:

The Surface of this Township except in the vicinity of the Streams is level or gently rolling.

The Soil East of the River is Sandy 3rd rate West of the River Loam & Sand 2nd rate.

North of Gauthier Creek and west of the River the Surface is covered with Aspen thickets and Oak timber. East of Chippewa River and North of Yellow River are Pileti(?) Pine openings South of Yellow River and along the Chippewa Yellow and White Pine of a good quality. The Swamps in Sections 34 and 35 are timbered with Tamarac Black Ash and Birch. The Prairie in this Township is nearly level has a light sandy soil and can be easily brought into cultivation.

A Saw Mill and 4 dwelling houses on the N.W. 1/4 of Section No. 25. belonging to Moses & Co. A Saw Mill and Dwelling House on the N.E. 1/4 of Section No. 16 belonging to Henry O'Neal. A Dwelling House Blacksmith Shop & other buildings at the mouth of Gauthier Creek belonging to Gauthier A farm on Section 20 and a House on Section 21 belonging to Stephen McCan and a House near the center of Section 29 belonging to Warren(?) and a small field near the North side of Section 32 and a Dwelling House At the foot of Eagle Rapids belonging to James Allen are all the improvements in This Township.

The same crew surveyed the next six-mile square up the river, north of modern Jim Falls, finding more settlers:

This Township has a gently rolling surface is well watered and has a good soil of Loam, Sand and gravel.

It is well timbered in every part with White Pine White & Black Oak Lind Elm Ash and Sugar tree.

The White Pine growing indiscriminately in the Swamps on the(?) ridges and along the Streams but it is more plenty(?) on the borders(?) of the Swamps and Streams than it is in the Swamps or on the ridges.

The Swamps are generally timbered with Tamarac Spruce Birch Black Ash and Maple White Cedar and Hemlock These Swamps are covered with a thick layer of Moss Which usually rests on a sand & gravel bottom(?). In many places the vegetable deposit is several feet thick.

There are six dwelling Houses in this Township, one on the N.W. 1/4 of the N.W. 1/4 of Section 2 One on the S.W. 1/4 of N.W. 1/4 of Section 2 belonging to Daniel McCan. One in Section 20 belonging to Donaldson & Co on the East Side of the river One on the West side of the River owned by Gauthier(?) One on the West side of the River in Section 30 and a farm in Sections 30 and 31 on the West side of the River belonging to David(?) Armitager(?) Who lives on the N.E. 1/4 of the S.W. 1/4 of Section No. 30

The rapids in This Township in Section 16 fall about 10 feet in one fourth of a Mile and offer every(?) facility for mill builders Also the rapids in(?) Section 30. Called Armitagers(?) falls afford Water power to any amount of the River falling about 50 feet in 3/4 of a Mile.

In 1861, Daniel McCann, who was a resident of Eagle Point, encountered Ahgamahwegezhig. This Indian had captured an eaglet, which he gave to McCann in exchange for a bushel of corn. After McCann sold the eagle to soldiers of the 8th Wisconsin Volunteer Infantry Regiment, she became their mascot Old Abe and accompanied them during many battles of the Civil War.

== Notable people ==
- Ingolf E. Rasmus, lawyer and Wisconsin State Representative, was born in the town
- Gustave Rheingans, farmer and Wisconsin State Representative, was born in the town
