= Pasco Palms Preserve =

Area of protected land in Pasco County, Florida

Coordinates: 28°13.304′N 82°44.924′W

Pasco Palms Preserve is an area of protected lands in the Beacon Square section of New Port Richey in Pasco County, Florida. It is located adjacent to Eagle Point Park to the west of U.S. Highway 19 North at 4466 Strauber Memorial Highway. The 116-acre preserve offers hiking and is open from sunup to sundown. It was acquired in 2009 and includes habitat for bird species, including the white ibis and snowy egret. It fronts on the Gulf of Mexico and includes nature trail with "wetlands, salt marshes, mixed hardwood pine forests, mangrove swamps and tidal flats," according to the Pasco County website Pasco County Environmental Lands Department holds events there, as does Pasco's EcoFest.
