= School District of Cadott =

School district in Wisconsin, United States

Coordinates: 44°56′59″N 91°08′52″W

School District of Cadott Community

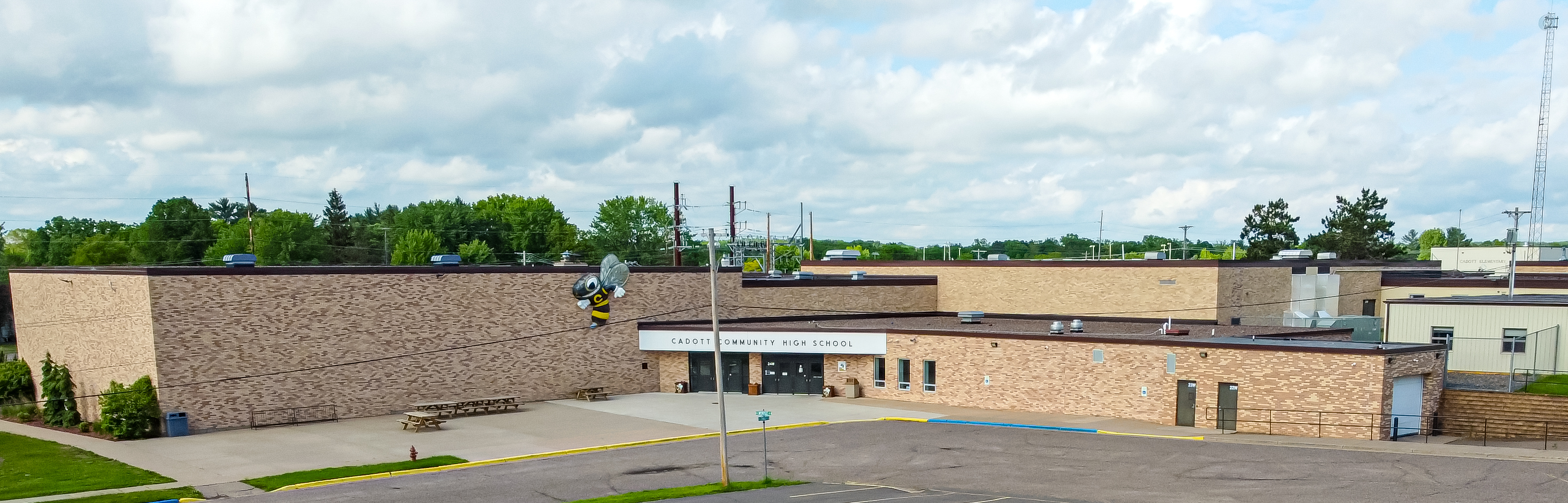
Cadott High School

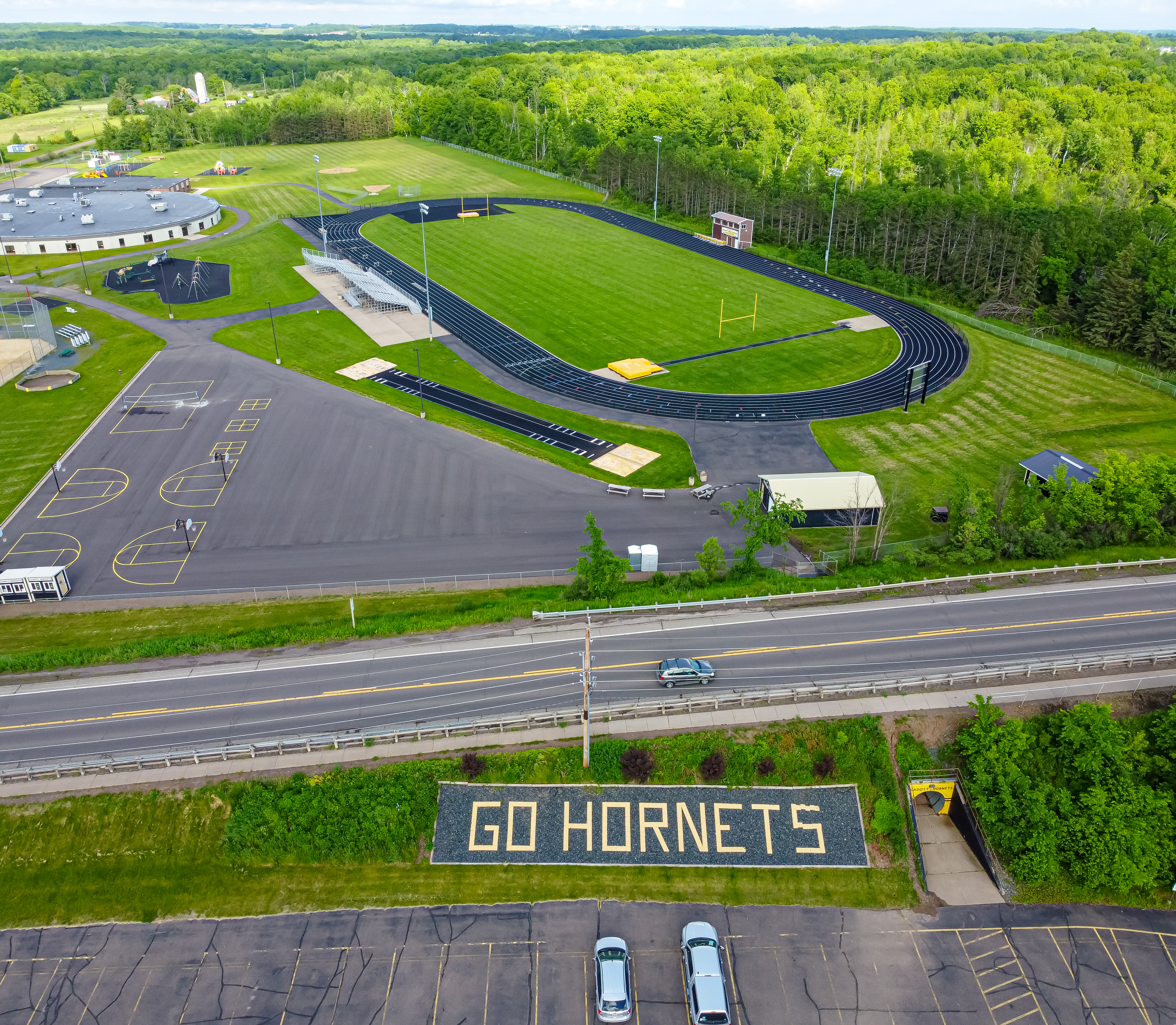
Athletic fields

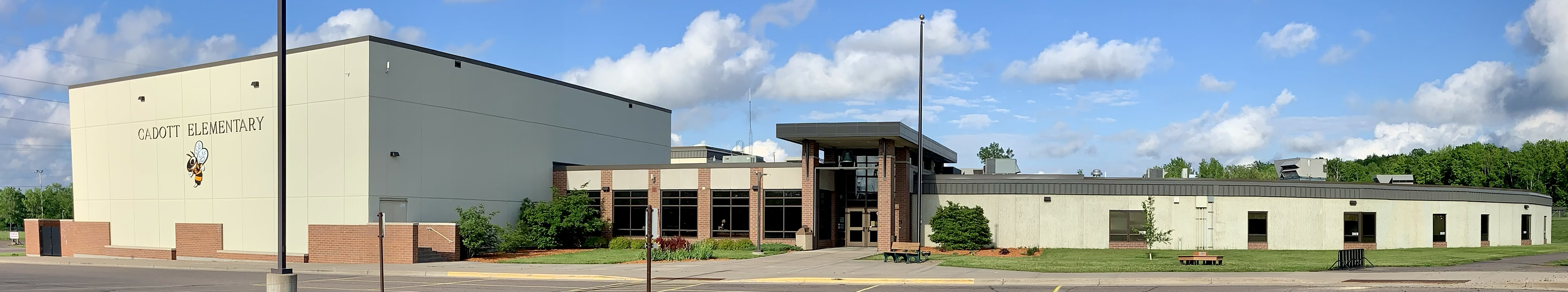
Cadott Elementary

The School District of Cadott Community is a school district in southwestern Chippewa County, Wisconsin. The district serves the village of Cadott as well as all or part of the towns of Sigel, Arthur, Goetz, Lafayette, Edson, Delmar, Anson and Colburn. As of 2003-2004, the district had 886 pupils with about 66 teachers. In 2000, the total population living in the district was 4,530.

The district is bordered on the north by Cornell School District, to the east by Stanley-Boyd Area School District, to the south by Augusta School District and Fall Creek School District and to the west by Chippewa Falls Area Unified School District.

== Schools ==
- Cadott Senior High School, 426 North Myrtle St
- Cadott Junior High School (in the same building as the senior high school)
- Cadott Elementary School, 463 East Mills St

=== Mission statement ===
It is the mission of the Cadott Community School District to challenge each and every student to reach his or her full potential.

=== Curriculum and classes ===
Cadott takes part in the SAGE program, meaning that in grades K through 3 there are no more than 18 students per classroom. In the Junior High students are introduced to exploring curriculum more with classes in fields such as agriculture/natural resources, business and information technology, family and consumer education, and technology education.

== History ==
The district dates back to 1875, when the Town of Sigel first organized a school district, though a one-room school has been built in 1868. Ground was broken on Cadott High School in 1882; its doors opened on January 16, 1884 and its first class graduated in 1887. New high school buildings were built in 1916 and 1960. Though elementary classes had been taught at the high school since 1886, Cadott Elementary School was first built in 1954 and was replaced by a new building in 1978.

In 1974, a 160-acre (0.65 km^{2}) school forest was donated in the Town of Anson. Donations to the district have allowed it to construct a building, develop trails and build an access through the property.

== Statistics ==
In the 2003-2004 school year, there were 313 pupils at the high school, 142 at the middle school and 431 in the elementary school. The district had a total of 65.74 staff members, 3 administrators and 31.90 aides, calculated using FTE. The pupil-to-licensed-instructor ratio was 1:13.48. More than 98% of the students are white.

The school district had $8.79 million in revenue in 2003-2004. 65% came from the state and 17% from local property taxes. It spent $8.21 million in that same school year. 51.9% was spent on instruction and 29.0% on administration and operation. The district spent $9,323 per pupil, slightly under the state average of $9,826.

== Athletics ==
Cadott's athletic mascot is the Hornet, and they have been members of the Cloverbelt Conference since its founding in 1927.
