= Old Abe =

Bald eagle and military mascot

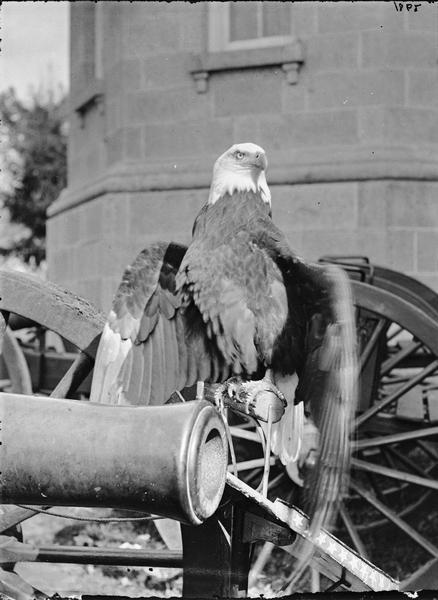
Old Abe spreading his wings for his portrait

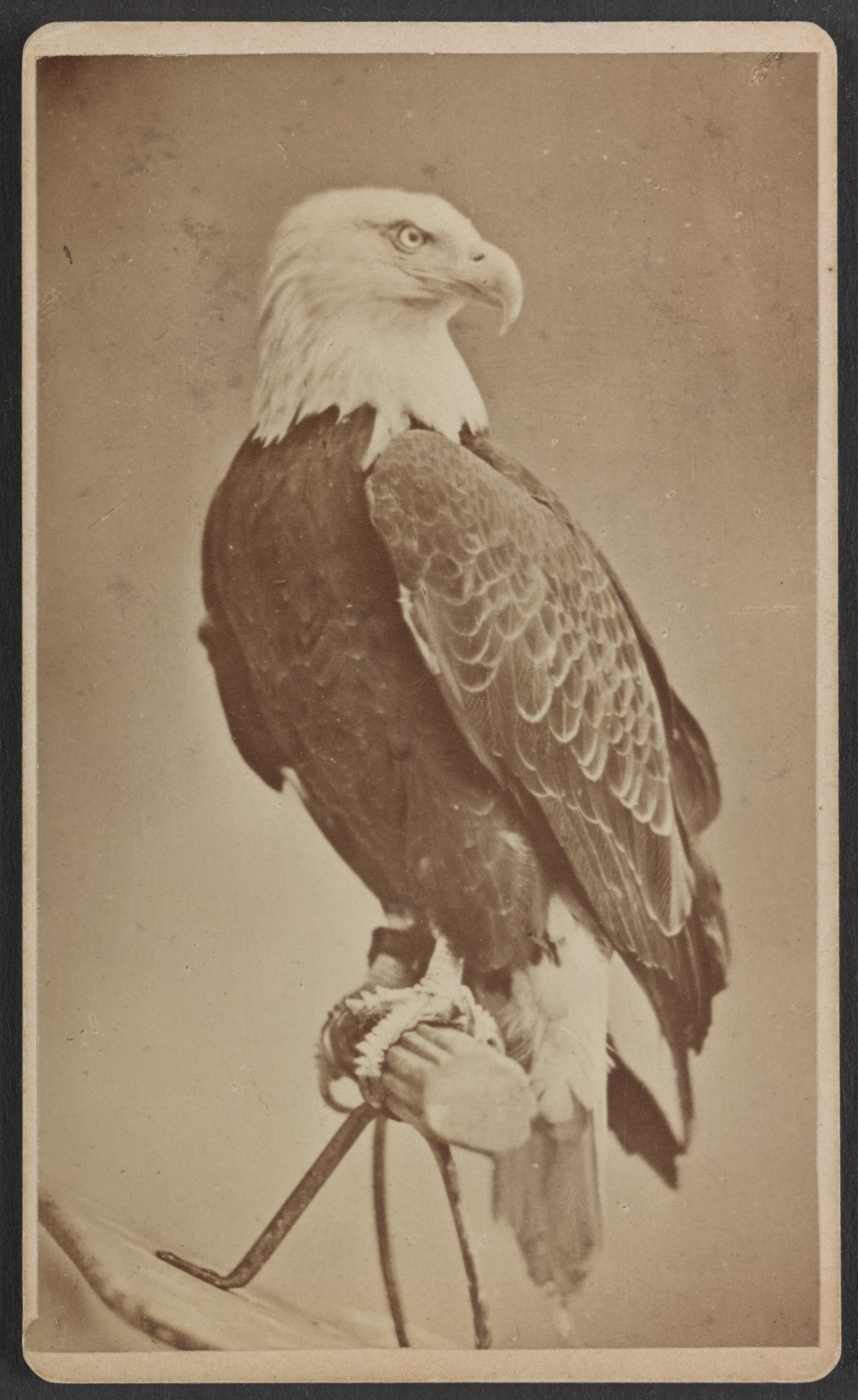
Old Abe, the live war eagle of Wisconsin, 1876. From the Liljenquist Family Collection of Civil War Photographs, Prints and Photographs Division, Library of Congress

Old Abe (May 27, 1861 – March 26, 1881) was a bald eagle who was the mascot of the 8th Wisconsin Volunteer Infantry Regiment in the American Civil War. Later, his image was adopted as the eagle appearing on a globe in Case Corporation's logo and as the screaming eagle on the insignia of the U.S. Army's 101st Airborne Division.

== Capture and sale ==
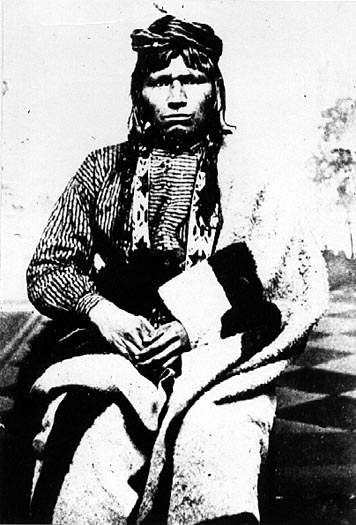
Ahgamahwegezhig (Chief Sky) Ojibwe captor of "Old Abe"

Old Abe was captured by Ahgamahwegezhig or "Chief Sky". He was the son of Ah-mous (translated either as "The Little Bee" or "Thunder of Bees"), who was an influential leader of the Lac du Flambeau Ojibwe.

In spring of 1861, Chief Sky set up a hunting and fishing camp near the South Fork of the Flambeau River, within the present day Chequamegon National Forest, east of Park Falls, Wisconsin. Here, he noticed a treetop nest, with two fledgling eagles, and, to capture them, cut down the tree. One eaglet died from the fall, and the other became the young Indian's pet. That summer, Chief Sky and his father canoed down the Chippewa River on a trading expedition. At Jim Falls, Wisconsin, they encountered Daniel McCann, who lived nearby in Eagle Point. The Indians sold the eagle to McCann in exchange for a bushel of corn.

In August 1861, John C. Perkins, assisted by Seth Pierce, Frank McGuire, Thomas G. Butler and Victor Wolf, recruited a company of volunteers from Eau Claire and Chippewa Counties. This company was called the "Eau Claire Badgers". Soon after its formation, McCann offered to sell the eagle to the Badgers, for $2.50. In his "History of Old Abe", published in 1865, Joseph O. Barrett, who helped McCann bring the eagle to Eau Claire, gave a description of the transaction, which can be paraphrased as:

"Will you buy my eagle," said McCann, "only two dollars and a half?"

"Here, boys, let's put in twenty five cents apiece," answered Frank McGuire, who began to collect quarters.

He also solicited a contribution from a civilian, S. M. Jeffers, but was rebuffed. When the soldiers heard of this, they accosted Jeffers, and gave him three lusty groans. When he understood that they were protesting against his reluctance to help buy the eagle, Jeffers laughed, paid for the bird with a Quarter Eagle and presented him to the Company. After that, he had cheers instead of groans. The quarters were returned to the donors.

Captain Perkins named the eagle after President Abraham Lincoln, his quartermaster, Francis L. Billings, made a special perch on which to carry the bird into battle, and a young soldier, James McGinnis, volunteered to take care of him.

== Civil War ==
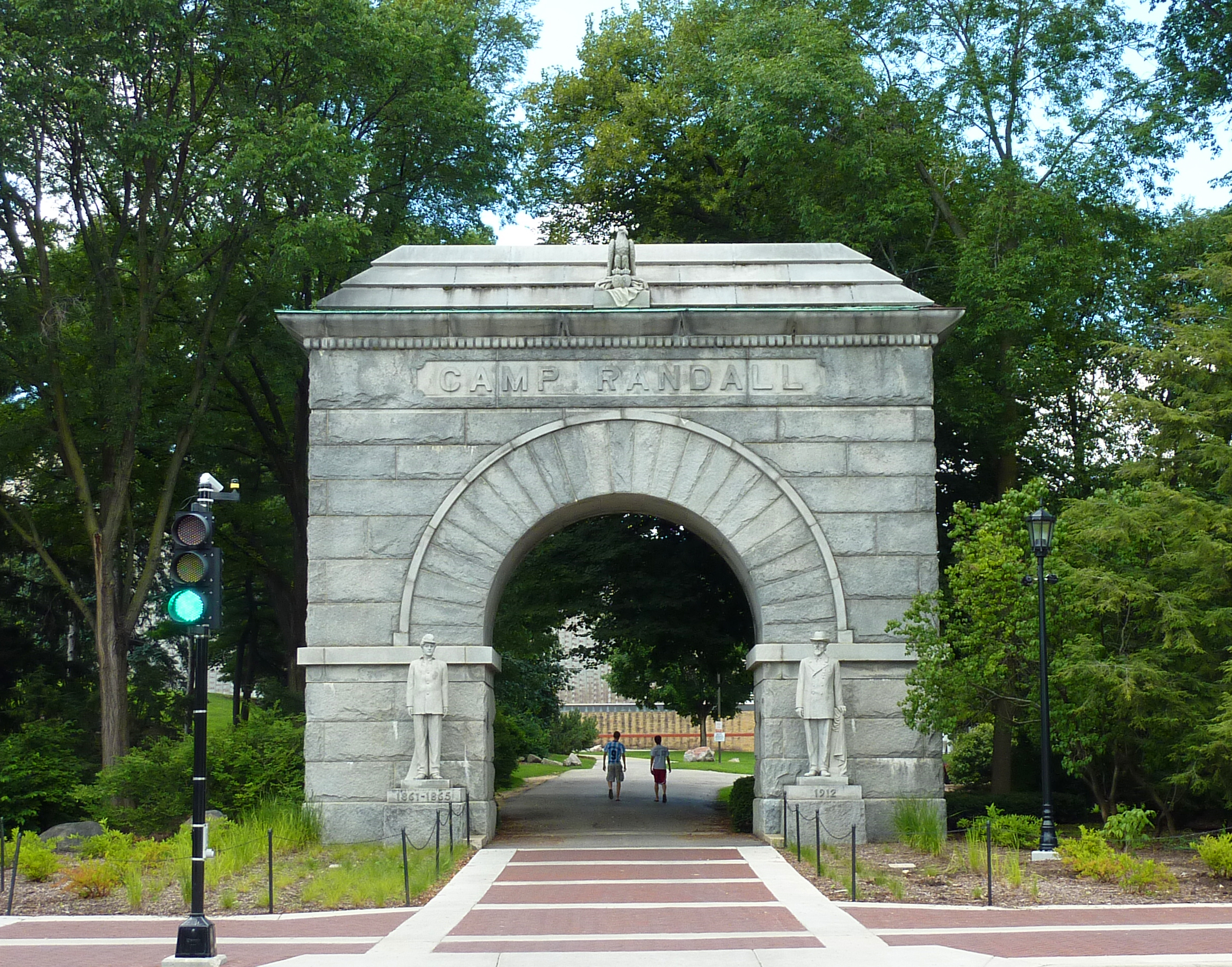
A sculpture of Old Abe is at the top of the Camp Randall Arch

On September 3, 1861, the Badgers embarked, aboard the steamer "Stella Whipple", on a trip down the Chippewa to the Mississippi and up the Wisconsin River to Madison, Wisconsin. They arrived on the 6th and were immediately mustered into service as Company C of the 8th Wisconsin Volunteer Infantry Regiment. They became the regimental color company and were given the name "Eagle Company". The regiment also became the "Eagle Regiment". After a few weeks of training at Camp Randall, it began to play an important role in the Western Theater of the American Civil War.

=== Island Number Ten ===
On October, 12, the regiment left for St. Louis, Missouri, where the eagle got loose and flew out of sight. Fortunately, a policeman soon returned him. On the following day, the regiment left by rail to Fredericktown, Missouri, and on October 20, 1861, took part in the battle of Fredericktown. Subsequently, they were assigned guard duty until March 4, 1862, when they relocated to Point Pleasant, near New Madrid, Missouri, where they became part of General John Pope's Army of the Mississippi. From this base, during March and April, they participated in the Battle of Island Number Ten, which ended with a major victory that opened the Mississippi to Union forces down to Fort Pillow, just above Memphis. Thousands of Confederate prisoners were taken, along with valuable supplies.

=== Corinth ===
In May 1862, the 8th participated in General Henry Halleck's Siege of Corinth, whose objective was to secure a critical rail junction of the Mobile & Ohio and Memphis & Charleston railroads. On May 9, 1862, during the approach to Corinth, the Eagle Company experienced its first serious combat at the Battle of Farmington, Mississippi, during which Old Abe Spread his wings and screamed. Here, Captain Perkins died and was replaced by the newly promoted Captain Victor Wolf. On May 29, after a skirmish at defensive works before Corinth, the Confederates withdrew during the night. The next day, the regiment marched into the city. That day, James McGinnis became sick with a fatal illness and was replaced as eagle bearer by Thomas J. Hill, who served until David McLain took over on August 18.

On August 22, after being bivouacked in summer quarters, the regiment arrived in Tuscumbia, Alabama, which is in the northwest corner of the state a few miles from the Mississippi border. By this time, General Ulysses S. Grant had taken over Halleck's responsibilities in northern Mississippi. The 8th Wisconsin was still part of the Army of the Mississippi, but General William Rosecrans had replaced Pope as commander. The regiment was in the second brigade of General David S. Stanley's second division, which was led by Colonel Joseph A. Mower. Pope's army was assigned to hold 20 miles of rail from Corinth east to Iuka, where the 8th Wisconsin was stationed. On September 13, 1862, the Confederate Army of the West under General Sterling Price appeared at Iuka and forced the regiment back to Farmington.

Shortly thereafter, forces under Rosecrans and General Edward Ord attempted to capture Price's army, which awaited, at Iuka, the arrival of massive reinforcements from General Earl Van Dorn's Army of West Tennessee. On September 19, during the Battle of Iuka, a fresh north wind caused an acoustic shadow that prevented Ord from hearing the battle. Consequently, he was unaware of it, and his troops stood idle while fighting raged a few miles away. Nevertheless, the Army of the Cumberland forced Price to withdraw during the night. He soon linked up with Van Dorn in Ripley.

On October 3 and 4, the combined Confederate armies launched a full-scale assault on Corinth, which was repulsed by troops under Rosecrans. During heavy fighting in this Second Battle of Corinth, 21 soldiers of the 8th Wisconsin died, and 60 were wounded. Colonel Mower was wounded in the neck and briefly captured.

Newspaper accounts of this battle claimed that Old Abe soared over the front lines. According to David McLain, these stories are exaggerated:

… a bullet cut the cord that held the eagle to his perch. About the same time that the cord was cut, Old Abe was shot through one wing, cutting out three quill feathers, but not drawing blood, and the bearer (McLain) was shot through the left shoulder of his blouse and right leg of his pants.

… (The eagle) flew about 50 feet down the line, must have been what caused the newspapers to come out the next week with great headlines telling about the eagle of the 8th Wisconsin getting away after a rebel bullet cut his cord and soaring, over the lines of both armies, and back to his perch, which is not so.

He was quite excited always in battle and he'd spread his wings and scream but never flew over the lines of either army.

=== Vicksburg ===
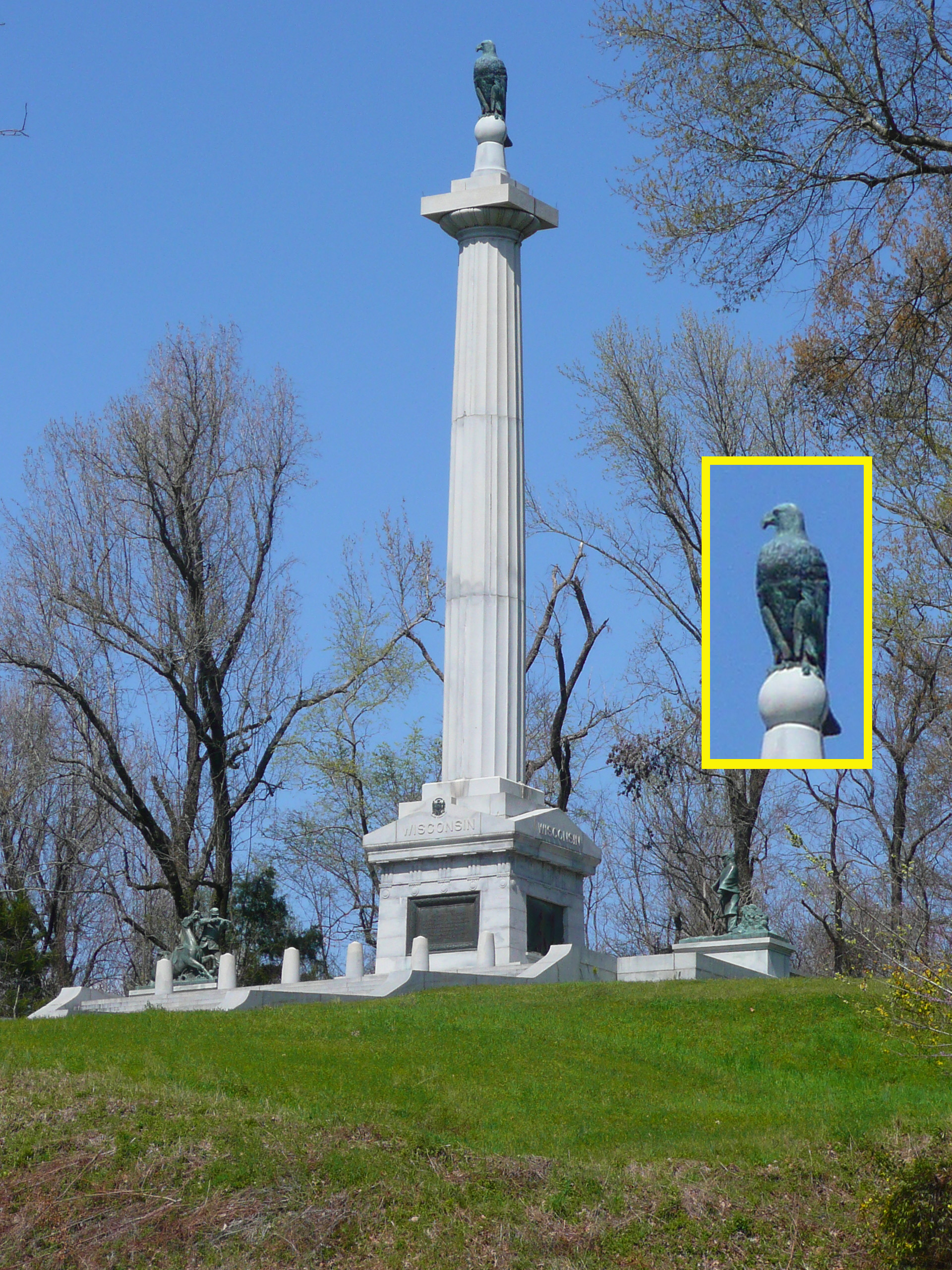
Old Abe on the Wisconsin Memorial, Vicksburg National Military Park

On November 2, 1862, the regiment moved to Grand Junction, Tennessee, where it joined forces being assembled for General Grant's first attempt to take the strategic river city of Vicksburg. From this base, Grant moved down the Mississippi Central Railroad in conjunction with General William Tecumseh Sherman, who launched a simultaneous advance north of the city. Confederates attempted to defend the railroad's Tallahatchie River bridge near Abbeville, but retreated when they learned of a flanking maneuver by Grant. Skirmishes were fought along the railroad to Oxford, and the Confederates were pushed south past Water Valley, but after the battle of Coffeeville, managed to stall the Federal advance at Oakland.

During this push, the 8th Wisconsin, with Old Abe, was in the thick of the fighting. In Oxford, the regiment was accosted by a southern girl who scornfully exclaimed: "Oh! See that Yankee Buzzard.", enraging the men, drawing a verbal response from the 8th's ranks that caused her to retreat hastily to her house. This was a name by which southern civilians and soldiers referred to Old Abe. Under orders from their officers, Confederate troops made numerous attempts to kill or capture the eagle, but they never succeeded.

On December 20, while Grant was stalled, General Van Dorn led a successful cavalry raid on the Union supply base at Holly Springs. After destroying the supplies, Van Dorn and General Nathan Bedford Forest moved north into Tennessee tearing up railroad and telegraph lines. With his infrastructure disrupted, and with Sherman's advance turned back at Chickasaw Bayou, Grant was forced to end the campaign and retire to Memphis.

At the time of Van Dorn's raid, the Wisconsin regiment was stationed in Holly Springs on guard duty. Its troops were surprised, overwhelmed, captured, and immediately paroled. Consequently, their commander, Colonel Murphy, was dismissed. He was replaced by Lieutenant Colonel Robbins, who was promoted to colonel. On December 28, when the regiment had moved to La Grange, Tennessee, David McLain turned over his job as eagle bearer to Ed Homeston.

In March 1863, the regiment went to Helena, Arkansas, where it became part of Grant's plan to cross the Mississippi south of Vicksburg. His objectives were to separate Vicksburg from Confederate units under General Joseph E. Johnston and to prevent supplies from reaching the city on the Southern Railroad.

From Helena, the regiment went to Young's Point, Louisiana, where they joined the second brigade of the third division of Sherman's XV Corps, under the command of Brigadier General Mower, who had been promoted on November 29, 1862. Here, on April 13, 1863, a promotion to Lieutenant Colonel went to Major John Wayles Jefferson. He had been with the regiment since it was formed, and as the grandson of Sally Hemings, is believed to have been also a grandson of Thomas Jefferson.

On May 2, Sherman's corps crossed the river at Grand Gulf and proceeded toward Raymond, Mississippi, which the XVII Corps under General James B. McPherson occupied on May 12. Sherman bypassed Raymond and advanced on Jackson, which he and McPherson took on May 14, and from which Johnston had withdrawn. After Sherman appointed Mower as military governor of Jackson, Union troops burned part of the town, destroyed numerous factories, and cut the railroad connections with Vicksburg. Grant's objectives were further consolidated when his army prevailed at the Battle of Champion Hill on May 16 and at the Battle of Big Black River Bridge on May 17. On May 22, the regiment participated in Grant's all-out assault on Vicksburg. When this operation failed, Grant reluctantly settled into a siege.

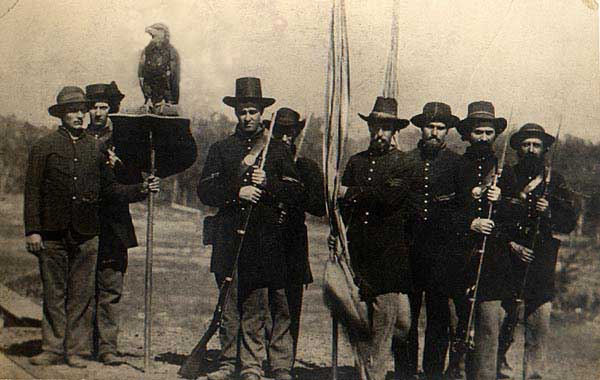
Old Abe and the color guard at Vicksburg, July 1863: Ed Homaston (far left holding perch), Sgt Ambrose Armitage (third from left)

During the siege, the 8th Wisconsin left Vicksburg to participate in an expedition to Mechanicsburg, Mississippi, where Benjamin Hilliker was severely wounded on June 4, 1863. They then returned to Young's Point where they blocked Confederates from escaping westward from Vicksburg. From this encampment, Sherman despatched them as part of a force assigned to drive General John G. Walker's Confederates from Richmond, Louisiana. This objective was accomplished by the Battle of Richmond, on June 15, after which the 8th returned to Young's Point.

On July 12, 1863, the regiment returned to Vicksburg, shortly after its surrender on July 4. Subsequently, the regiment camped in various places near Vicksburg, from which they joined several mop-up operations. During this period, in September, Ed Homeston resigned his position as eagle bearer, John Burkhardt took charge of Old Abe, and Colonel Robbins was replaced by Lieutenant Colonel Jefferson. Under his command, the regiment joined McPherson's expedition to Canton, from October 14 to 20, and participated in expeditions toward Pocahontas, Arkansas against General Nathan Bedford Forest. From February 3, 1864, until March 5, they took part in Sherman's Meridian expedition against an important railroad center and arsenal in eastern Mississippi.

In the following letter to Governor Edward Salomon, General William T. Sherman summarized the activities of the Eighth Wisconsin during the Vicksburg campaign:

Headquarters 15th Army Corps,

Sept. 21st, 1863

To His Excellency, the Governor of Wisconsin:

Sir Lt. Col. Jefferson, of the Eighth Wisconsin, is about to start for his home on a short leave of absence, during the period of rest allowed us by the lull of military events in this quarter. I avail myself of the opportunity to express to you my personal and official approbation of the entire regiment since I have had the honor to count it as one of my command. The Eighth Wisconsin has ever done its whole duty, in the camp, on the march and in battle. It has shared with us all the honors and success of our conquest of Mississippi and has displayed peculiar courage and gallantry at Jackson, May 14th, and throughout the siege of Vicksburg.

It also, under the leadership of Gen. Mower, cleared the west bank of the river, driving the enemy out of Richmond, La., and bore patiently and manfully the deadly sickness of Young's Point, till the fall of Vicksburg admitted of its recall to join us on this higher and more healthy ground. I am glad to report that the men are fast recovering from the sickness caused by that exposure, and I hope it will share with us our future labors and honors. If within your power, I hope you will fill its thinned ranks, and then I will promise all I can to ensure its return to your State, bearing a full share of honor and fame in the establishment of our General Government on a basis so firm, that no internal or external power can shake it during this generation.

With great respect, etc.,
W. T. SHERMAN,

Maj. Gen.

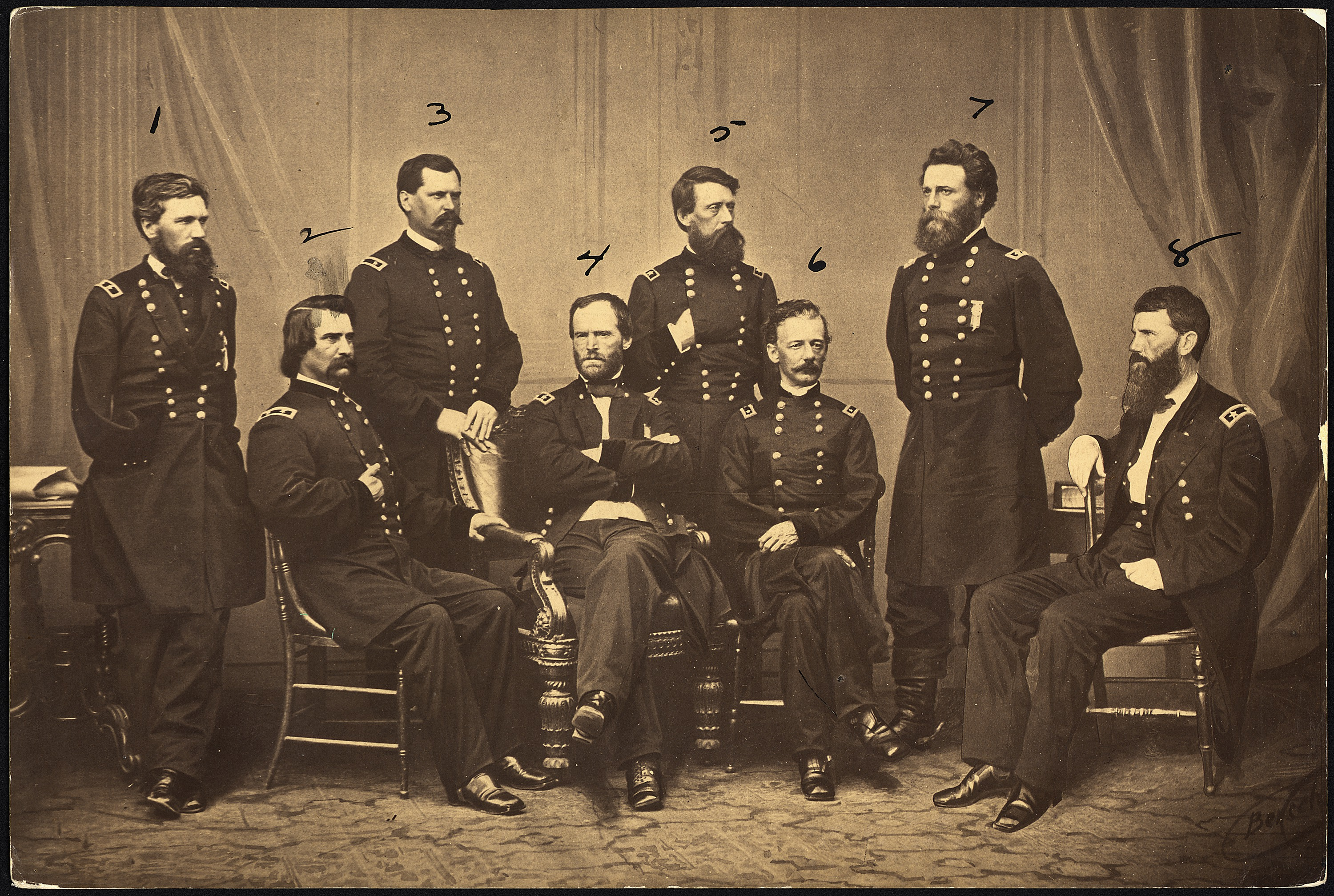
Sherman and his Generals: 1. O. O. Howard; 2. J. A. Logan; 3. W. B. Hazen; 4. W. T. Sherman; 5. J. C. Davis; 6. H. W. Slocum; 7. J. A. Mower; 8. F. P. Blair.

Sherman was not the only general who had a high regard for the 8th Wisconsin and Old Abe. In the words of David McLain:

I have frequently seen Generals Grant, Sherman, McPherson, Rosecrans, Blair, Logan, and others, when they were passing our regiment, raise their hats as they passed Old Abe, which always brought a cheer from the regiment and then the eagle would spread his wings …

=== Red River Campaign ===
In early 1864, many soldiers in the 8th Wisconsin became eligible for veteran furlough. However, General Sherman made a special request that they join General A. J. Smith's forces who had been assigned to the Red River Campaign, along with troops from the Army of the Gulf, under General Nathaniel P. Banks, and Admiral David Dixon Porter's Mississippi River Squadron. After agreeing to Sherman's request, the regiment joined the Right wing of the xvi corps, under the command of General Mower. On March 10, 1864, the contingent began a voyage from Vicksburg down the Mississippi and up the Red River to Simmesport, Louisiana, where they disembarked on March 12. Two days later, Mower's command surprised and captured Fort DeRussy, which opened the river up to Alexandria.

After arriving there on March 16, the troops from Vicksburg settled down to wait for Banks to arrive and to assess opposing forces under General Richard Taylor, who was the son of President Zachary Taylor. While waiting, General Mower assembled a task force, with which he proceeded twenty five miles to Henderson's hill on Bayou Rapides. Here, he encountered Confederate defenses. After leaving a blocking force to engage the defenders at the front, he made a detour of 15 miles to get to their rear, where he arrived around midnight on the cold and rainy night of March 21. On the way, a courier from General Taylor was captured and provided the countersign. This enabled Mower's forces, including the 8th Wisconsin, to overcome the defenses without a shot being fired. In addition to 262 prisoners, 4 guns and 400 horses were taken.

This success made it possible for Smith's army to move quickly upriver to Grand Ecore, where it prepared to support forces of General Banks, which were advancing on Shreveport. On April 8, Banks was routed by Taylor at the Battle of Mansfield. This was a decisive victory, for it stopped the Union advance and turned the campaign into a general retreat.

That evening, retreating units under Banks reached Pleasant Hill nearly simultaneously with Smith's XVII and XVI Corps, which included the 8th Wisconsin. These reinforcements enabled the Union to win the next day's Battle of Pleasant Hill, but Banks immediately ordered a retreat to Grand Ecore, and from there, to Alexandria. During this retreat, the regiment fought rear guard actions at Natchitoches, Monett's Ferry, and Cloutierville.

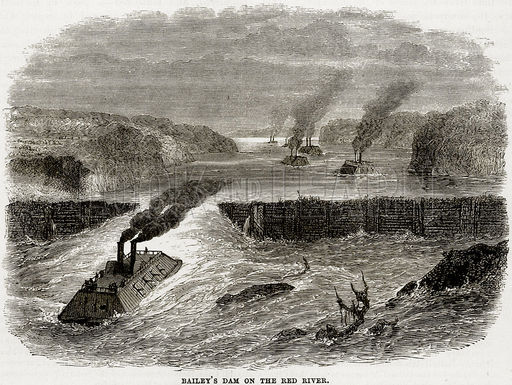
Bailey's Dam on the Red River. Illustration from Cassell's History of the United States by Edward Ollier (c. 1900).

After Smith's forces arrived in Alexandria on April 26, they were temporarily deployed to prevent attacks during Joseph Bailey's attempts to get Porter's squadron over the rapids there, with the aid of Bailey's Dam and two small wing dams upstream. After this task was completed, Banks resumed his retreat on May 13, leaving Alexandria in flames.

On May 16, Union forces reached Mansura where Taylor's army attempted to prevent them from reaching river transportation. After heavy fighting, the Confederates fell back, and the Union troops marched toward Simmesport, where Bailey was building a bridge over the Atchafalaya River that would allow them to reach transport ships. On the 18th, Banks learned that Taylor's force was deployed near Yellow Bayou and arranged for Mower to stop the Confederates. After several hours of see-saw action, the ground cover caught fire and forced both sides to retire. The next day, Smith's army embarked and reached Vicksburg on the 24th.

In early June 1864, General Smith ordered Mower to launch a forceful demonstration to deter interference with Mississippi river traffic near Lake Village, Arkansas. This town is named for its location on Lake Chicot, an oxbow lake formed from the Mississippi. On the evening of June 5, Mower disembarked and camped near Sunnyside Landing. The next morning, as he marched along the south side of the lake, Confederates, led by General Colton Greene, fought a delaying action at Ditch Bayou and then withdrew. The Union troops advanced to Lake Village, camped there overnight, and the next day, boarded transports that took them to Memphis. At Ditch Bayou, the regiment lost 3 killed and 16 wounded.

=== Return to Wisconsin ===
On June 19, 1864, 240 reenlisted veterans left Memphis on furlough, with their eagle. They arrived at Chicago on the 21st. The next day, flags were displayed along the streets of Madison, the bells of the city were rung, and a national salute was fired. At the Capitol, crowds of citizens assembled to greet the veterans and Old Abe. Here, they were addressed by several dignitaries, including General Lucius Fairchild, Colonel Jefferson and Chauncey Abbott, who was a former mayor of Madison.

A few days later, on June 26, 56 veterans of Company C arrived at Eau Claire, with the eagle, and were greeted with booming cannons, martial music, patriotic songs, and an abundant feast. Citizens of Chippewa Falls constructed a huge wigwam. Here, according to Reverend Joseph O. Barrett, who spoke at the celebration, a great feast was served to Old Abe and the soldiers on July 4, 1864. Afterwards, a procession circled through the streets, headed by a band, the eagle and the veterans.

In August 1864, the veterans and Old Abe returned from furlough to Memphis. During their absence, the regiment had been active in northern Mississippi. Following Forrest's victory over a large Union force at Brice's Crossroads, on June 10, 1864, Sherman vowed to track him down with forces under "two officers at Memphis who will fight all the time, A. J. Smith and J. A. Mower." A month later, Mower's four brigades overtook Forrest near Tupelo, Mississippi, repulsed a series of attacks, and inflicted hundreds of casualties, including the slight wounding of Forrest himself. On August 13, 1864, the day after Mower had been promoted to Major General, the regiment, including the returned troops, participated in another defeat of Forrest's command at Hurricane Creek, Mississippi This was Old Abe's last battle.

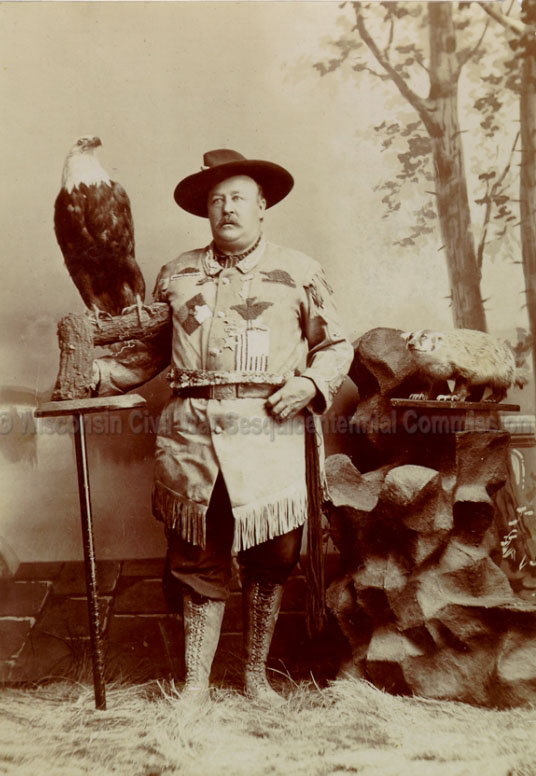
Old Abe and George Gillies, who was the last eagle caretaker.

September 16, 1864, marked the end of the three years for which original members of the 8th Wisconsin had enlisted. Consequently, the veterans headed north with the eagle, whom the regiment had agreed to give to the state of Wisconsin. On September 21, they reached Chicago, where John Burkhardt resigned as eagle bearer and turned Old Abe over to John H. Hill, who had been disabled by a wound at Corinth. He was the brother of Thomas J. Hill who had also served as eagle bearer. The next day, Hill bore the eagle into Madison at the head of 70 veterans, of which 26 were from Company C. Here, on the 26th, Captain Victor Wolf presented Old Abe to Governor James T. Lewis, who handed the eagle, with its perch, to Quartermaster General N. F. Lund.

== Postbellum ==
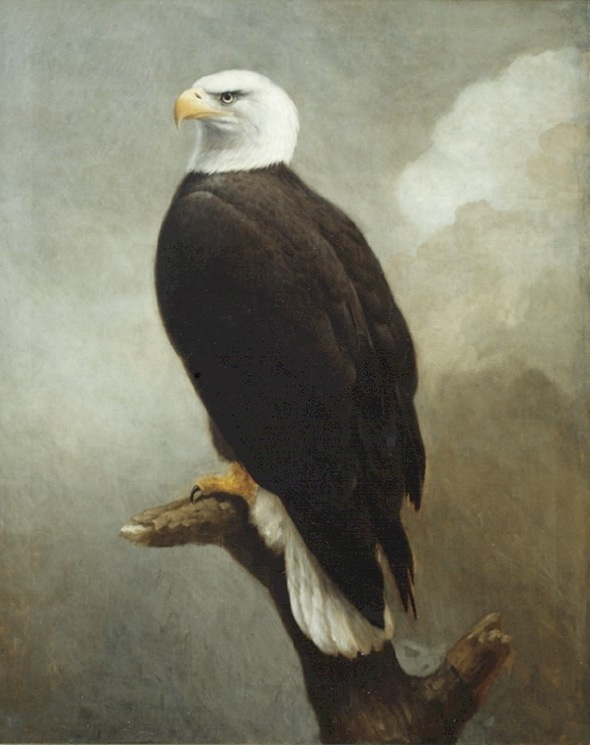
Old Abe painted by James R. Stuart (1875).

After Wisconsin took possession of Old Abe, state officials classified him as a "War Relic" and created an "Eagle Department" in the Capitol building, which included a two-room "apartment," a custom bathtub for the eagle, and a caretaker. Later, John Hill served as a caretaker. Eigg-native Captain Angus R. McDonald, the hero of the Battle of Fort Blakeley and Scottish-American descended from Somerled, King Robert the Bruce, and the Chiefs of Clan MacDonald of Clanranald, and last direct descendant of iconic Scottish Gaelic war poet Alasdair Mac Mhaighstir Alasdair, also served as Old Abe's paid caretaker.

Old Abe became a nationally known celebrity, whose presence at events was requested by individuals and organizations from the state and the country. Old Abe appeared at the 1876 Centennial Exposition in Philadelphia, Pennsylvania and the 1880 Grand Army of the Republic National Convention. Other events were fundraisers for charities, which included: the 1865 Northwest Sanitary Fair in Illinois, Soldiers' Home Fair, Soldier's Orphan's Home, Harvey Hospital, and Ladies Aid Society of Chippewa Falls.

In February 1881, a small fire broke out in the basement of the Capitol. After Old Abe raised an alarm, the fire was quickly put out. However, the eagle inhaled a large amount of thick black smoke, and about a month later, lost strength and began to decline. On March 26, 1881, in spite of the efforts of numerous doctors, Old Abe died in the arms of caretaker George Gilles.

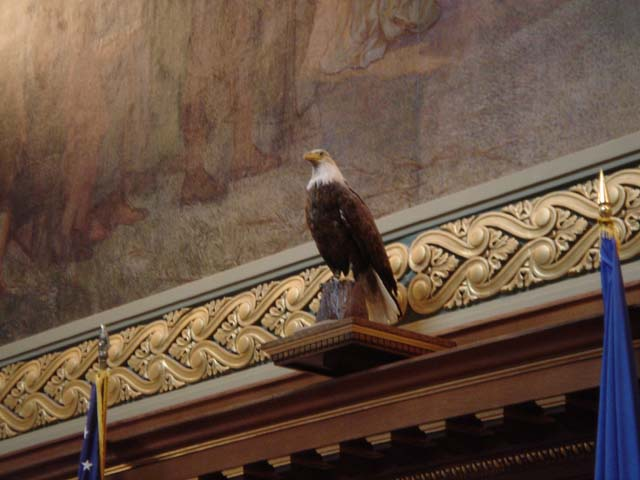
A replica of Old Abe in the Wisconsin State Assembly Chamber (the actual remains, and the Capitol building, burned in 1904)

On September 17, 1881, Old Abe's stuffed remains were placed in a glass display case located in the rotunda of the Capitol. Four years later, Old Abe was moved, within the Capitol, from the rotunda to the G.A.R. Memorial Hall. In 1900, his remains were transferred to the new building of the State Historical Society of Wisconsin. However, pressure from veterans convinced Governor Robert M. La Follette to return Old Abe to the Capitol building in 1903. That year, President Theodore Roosevelt viewed the remains and expressed his pleasure at being able to see the eagle he had studied in school as a child. However, in 1904, Old Abe's remains and the glass case were destroyed in a fire that razed the Capitol building.

Since 1915, a replica of Old Abe has presided over the Wisconsin State Assembly Chamber in the Capitol, and another is on display at the Wisconsin Veterans Museum in Madison. A stone sculpture of the eagle is at the top of the Camp Randall Arch.
There is an Old Abe statue in Park Falls, Wisconsin. The statue is not only a remembrance of Old Abe, but also dedicated to the men and women of the Park Falls area who have served, or are currently serving, in the Armed Forces. The statue is located at Old Abe Memorial Park 155 N 3rd Ave, Park Falls, WI 54552.

== In memoriam ==
In 1865, Jerome Case incorporated Old Abe into the trademark of the J. I. Case agricultural equipment manufacturing company of Racine, Wisconsin. This trademark was retired in 1969.

The insignia of the U.S. Army's 101st Airborne Division is a depiction of Old Abe. Wisconsin was the territory of the original 101st Division after World War I, and the insignia's design is based on Civil War traditions of the state. The black shield derives from black hats worn by members of the Iron Brigade. This was a famous Civil War unit composed of western regiments, which included three from Wisconsin, but not the 8th regiment.

Old Abe is the mascot of Eau Claire Memorial High School, whose athletic teams are known as "Old Abes", and of Racine Case High School, whose teams are "Eagles".

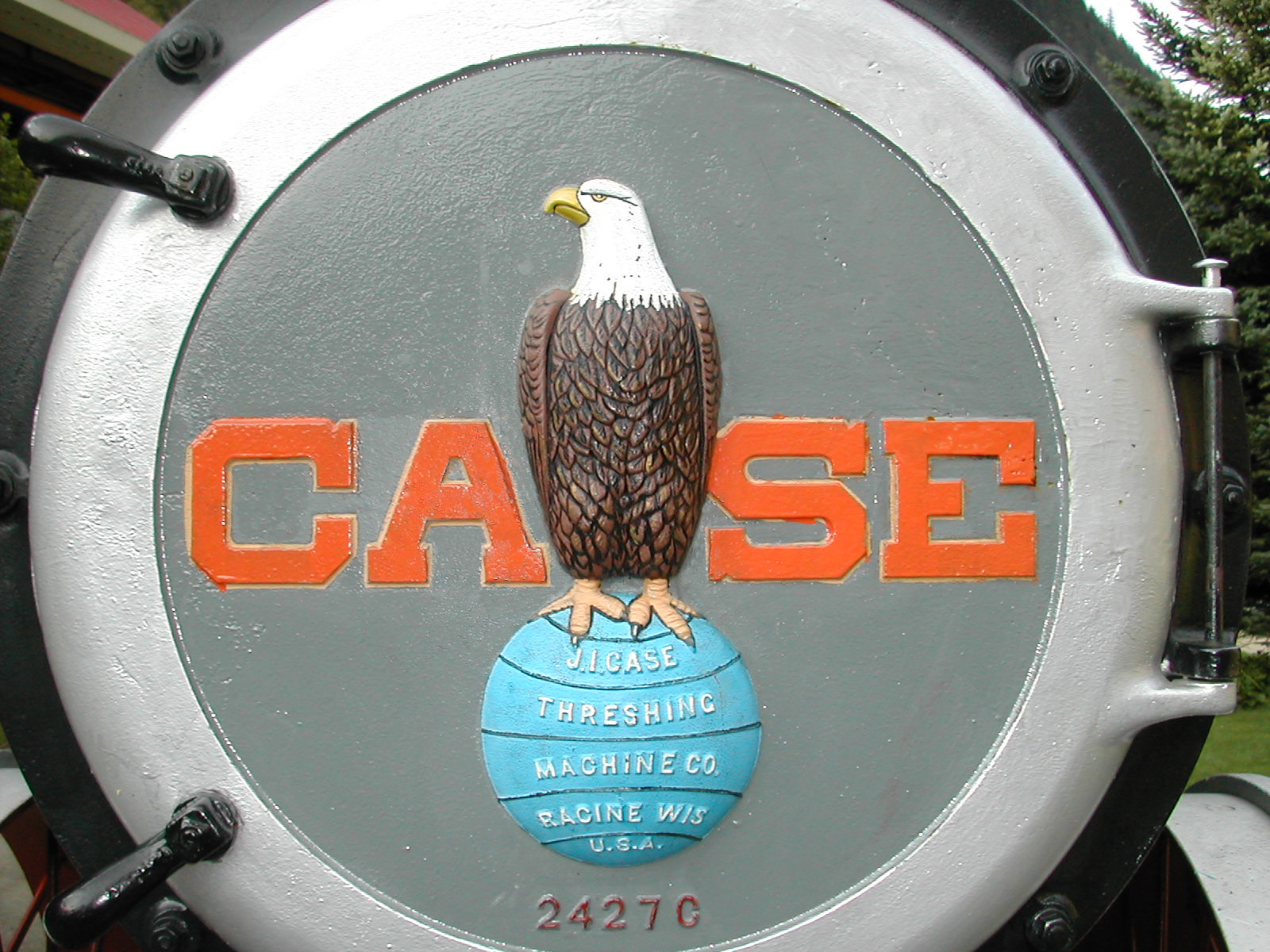
Case Corporation logo

101st Airborne Division shoulder patch

== See also ==
- List of individual birds
