= McCann brothers =

The McCann brothers were three Irishmen who migrated from Ohio to Wisconsin in the mid-nineteenth century. They played an important role in the early phases of Wisconsin's lumber industry, and in the political and social organization of Chippewa County.

Their parents, Arthur McCann, who was of Irish descent, and Barbary Smith were born in Pennsylvania. In 1810, they married in Scioto County, Ohio, where the two oldest brothers, Stephen Smith McCann and Arthur J. McCann, were born in 1811 and 1814, respectively. In 1816, the youngest of the three, Daniel McCann, was born in Adams County, Ohio. A fourth brother, Thomas McCann, was born in 1824, but he stayed in Ohio.

The elder Arthur and his brother, Thomas, came to Clinton County, Ohio, in 1811, shortly after it was founded in 1810. They were among the earliest Catholics to locate here. These McCanns built and operated a pottery in Wilmington, Ohio, where they manufactured a dark colored, finely polished ware.

== Stephen Smith McCann ==
(October 4, 1811 - November 1, 1880) On January 16, 1831, after making his way down the Ohio River and up the Mississippi and Illinois Rivers to Tazewell County, Illinois, Stephen McCann married his first wife, Sarah Hughs, with whom he had four children. Shortly thereafter, he served, from June 1831 to May 27, 1832, in the Black Hawk War. He was a member of the "mounted volunteers" from Pekin, under Captain John Giles Adams. Abraham Lincoln was a famous participant in this conflict, which marked the end of native armed resistance to U.S. expansion in the Northwest Territory.

After the war, he lived with Sarah in Dubuque, before it became Incorporated into the Iowa Territory. Because of its location on the Mississippi River, near forests in Minnesota and Wisconsin, Dubuque had become a center for the lumber industry. Consequently, after the 1837 Treaty of St. Peters opened northern Wisconsin to settlement, Stephen went to Prairie du Chien, Wisconsin, to work in this industry. Because this town is located at the confluence of the Mississippi and Wisconsin Rivers, it had developed as a major center of the North American fur trade, where French Canadian voyageurs coming from Lake Michigan along the Fox–Wisconsin Waterway met Americans coming up the Mississippi, and Métis coming down the river from the Red River Colony in Canada.

In Prairie du Chien, on November 22, 1842, Stephen McCann married his second wife, Wilhelmina Rachel Johnston, with whom he had seven children. By this time, his brothers, Arthur and Daniel, had joined him near Menomonie, Wisconsin. Here, in 1841, he had bought a sawmill from Hiram S. Allen, on the west side of the Red Cedar River. Two years later, the mill burned down. While continuing to live near Menomonie, the three brothers soon joined with Jeremiah C. Thomas to build the Blue Mill, near Lake Hallie, between Eau Claire and Chippewa Falls. Later, after several changes of ownership and many improvements, this mill was acquired by the Badger State Lumber Company and became known as Badger Mills. Its operations were discontinued in the 1890s due to a shortage of logs.

During the summer of 1845, Stephan McCann, in partnership with J. C. Thomas, put up three buildings within the present day city of Eau Claire. These structures were erected to establish a claim to the land they stood on, but Stephen moved his family into one of them. Consequently, his family, whose home was located near the corner of Eau Claire and Farwell streets, became the first permanent settlers in Eau Claire.

In 1846, at Stephen's home, the first religious services were conducted in Eau Claire by Thomas Randall, and that fall, the first wedding took place, when George Randall married Mary LaPointe. She was the sister of Daniel McCann's wife, Margaret.

In the following year, George Randall and his brother, Simon, secured a half interest in the claim of McCann and Thomas at the mouth of the Eau Claire River and became part of a firm McCann, Randall & Thomas, which immediately began to construct a dam and sawmill. The dam was completed in October 1846.

On June 5, 1847, a terrible flood caused the Chippewa River to rise twelve feet:

( By noon,) every log, pier and boom on the Eau Claire was swept away by the fast swelling flood. In another hour the new double sawmill that had just been erected and was ready to be operated was borne almost bodily away by the resistless current.

After this destruction, the firm went bankrupt, the partnership dissolved, and J. C. Thomas went back to the Blue Mill.

On September 21, 1847, Stephan McCann moved to Chippewa Falls and became a farmer. When Chippewa County was organized on December 29, 1854, George P. Warren was Chairman of the Board of Supervisors, Stephen S. McCann was the other Supervisor, and Samuel H. Allison was the Clerk. In 1856, Stephen became the first justice of the peace in the new county and held court in his home, which had been built in 1849. In the spring of 1857, he moved to his upper farm near Eagle Point.

In September 1861, at the age of 45, Stephen enlisted in the Wisconsin Infantry, along with three of his sons and two of his sons in law. He was assigned to be Brigade Wagoner, but in March 1862, he became ill and was discharged the following month.

In 1876, Stephen Smith McCann moved to the Eau Claire home of his daughter Wilmetta McDonald, where he lived until his death of dropsy in 1880. Funeral services were held in the First Congregational Church, and he was buried at Lakeview Cemetery in Eau Claire.

== Arthur McCann ==
(1814 - 1844) In 1840, Arthur McCann joined his brothers in Menomonie. That year, he married Rosalie Demarie, a daughter of the well-known Métis fur trader Louis Demarie. In 1832-1833, the Demarie family had been the first settlers to live in Eau Claire over the winter months. Rosalie's half-sister, Mary, had married Hiram S. Allen in 1836, and another sister, Margaret, was married to Samuel Lamb, who built the first house in Dunnville, on the bank of the Red Cedar River, 12 miles south of Menomonie. Rosalie's mother, Angeline Collins, who was also Metis, was a well known healer, physician and medicine woman. Lamb's house became a popular tavern, but he lacked business acumen, the enterprise failed, and he sold the place to Arthur.

During Arthur's partnership with his brothers and J. C. Thomas, he hired an employee named Sawyer to work at the Blue Mill. One evening, Sawyer came to the tavern, where:

McCann offered him a drink. The first drink led to another and another. The two men sat down and began to play cards. "Art figured he'd get those wages back," brother Daniel McCann said, shaking his head. The cards led to an argument. McCann stood up and dropped Sawyer with his fists. Sawyer pulled himself to the door, swearing to get revenge. He went to the cabin of Philo Stone nearby, pulling a loaded rifle off the pegs above the door, and returned to McCann's place. Knocking on the door, Sawyer waited until McCann stood in the opening and he pressed the trigger. McCann fell, mortally wounded, on his own doorstep. The waters of Spring Creek (now located in what is Eau Claire County) ran red for days, but the murderer of Arthur McCann was never apprehended.

Consequently, Arthur McCann became known as the first white man to die at the hands of another white man in the Chippewa Valley. Shortly after Arthur died his widow remarried, and in 1862, she was married for a third time to George P. Warren

== Daniel McCann ==
Daniel McCann

(January 26, 1816 - October 2, 1890). Daniel McCann's wife was Margaret LaPointe. Her father, Louis Sulpice Desautels LaPointe, was a French Canadian employee of the Hudson's Bay Company. He was in the thick of its conflict with the North West Company, before the two companies were forced to merge in 1820. His duties took him to the Red River Colony, where he married Emilie Bottineau in 1819. She was Métis, for her French Canadian father was also a Hudson's Bay employee, and her mother was a "Chippewa woman from the Hair Hills", which refers to a district 50 miles southwest of present day Winnipeg. Her daughter Margaret's Indian name was Mahjequa.

After he married Emily, Sulpice LaPointe moved his family from the Red River Colony to St. Anthony, Minnesota, traveling by canoe. Because the falls here prevent navigation further up the Mississippi, nearby Saint Paul, became a trading center, where goods carried by ox carts along the Red River Trails were transferred to and from steamboats. In 1830, Sulpice, taking advantage of this convenient transportation, moved down the Mississippi to Prairie du Chien, where Daniel married Margaret on December 21, 1838.

The next year, Daniel and Margaret joined his brothers in Menomonie. Soon he moved his family to Eau Claire, where they lived until Hiram Allen sold him an 88 acre parcel on April 30, 1854, for $110. This was the first transaction entered at the Register of Deeds Office, in Chippewa Falls. Its record shows that the parcel is located in Cornell, Wisconsin, near the Old Abe State Trail, 2.5 miles northeast of the dam in Jim Falls, Wisconsin. Here, Daniel built a log home, and in January 1856, was issued a tavern license, permitting him to cater to travelers on the nearby Chippewa river. By this time, he was residing in Eagle Point, where his brother Stephen owned land and would soon join him.

During the first meeting of the county Board of Supervisors, they appointed James Ermatinger, Henry O'Neil, and Daniel McCann to lay out a road to Vermillion Falls. These falls were eventually renamed "Jim Falls" in honor of Ermatinger. O'Neil was a pioneer trader and lumberman. In 1851, he built a sawmill at the mouth of a stream that flows through Eagle Point township, which became known as O'Neil Creek.

Although Daniel McCann could not read music, he could play countless marches and cotillions on his fiddle. His services were in demand at numerous balls and parties.

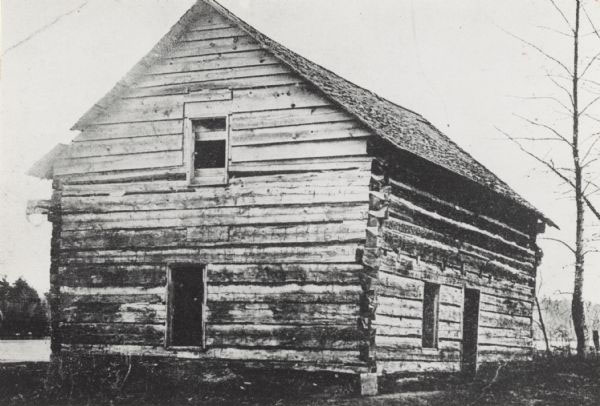
Daniel McCann's cabin where Old Abe was kept after being captured as a wild eaglet.

In 1861, a group of Indians on a trading expedition stopped at Daniel's tavern near Jim Falls. One of them, Ahgamahwegezhig or "Chief Sky", brought a pet eaglet he had captured a few months earlier. He sold the bird to McCann in exchange for a bushel of corn. That year, many of Daniel's neighbors and relatives left to fight in the American Civil War. Because of a childhood leg injury, he was not able to join them, but took the eagle to Eau Claire, where he offered the bird as a mascot to a newly recruited company, which was called the "Eau Claire Badgers". The soldiers laughed at the offer, but:

(when Daniel) cuddled the fiddle under his chin, closed his eyes for a moment and began to play Bonaparte's Retreat from Moscow, the soldiers were amazed to see the eagle dance back and forth to the music.

They bought the eagle for $2.50, named it "Old Abe", and departed for Madison, Wisconsin, where they were mustered into service as Company C of the 8th Wisconsin Volunteer Infantry Regiment and given the new name "Eagle Company". The regiment became the famous "Wisconsin Eagle Regiment". With Old Abe as its mascot, it played an important role in the Western Theater of the American Civil War.

in 1890, Daniel McCann died from stomach cancer at the age of 74. Funeral services were held by the Methodist church, and he is buried in O'Neill Creek Cemetery in Eagleton.
