= Cobban, Wisconsin =

- Unincorporated community
- Location within Wisconsin Location within the United States
- Coordinates: 45°06′11″N 91°12′23″W
- Country: United States
- State: Wisconsin
- County: Chippewa
- Town: Arthur
- Elevation: 968 ft (295 m)
- Time zone: UTC-6 (Central (CST))
  - Summer (DST): UTC-5 (CDT)
- Area codes: 715 & 534
- GNIS feature ID: 1577553

Cobban is an unincorporated community located in the town of Arthur, Chippewa County, Wisconsin, United States. Cobban is located on the east bank of the Chippewa River at the junction of County Highways K and TT, 5.2 miles (8.4 km) south-southwest of Cornell.

== History ==
A post office called Cobban was established in 1904, and remained in operation until 1934. The community was named for S. C. F. Cobban, a landowner.
