= Eagle Point (community), Wisconsin =

Eagle Point, Wisconsin
- Unincorporated community
- Location within Wisconsin Location within the United States
- Coordinates: 45°01′54″N 91°23′46″W
- Country: United States
- State: Wisconsin
- County: Chippewa
- Town: Eagle Point
- Elevation: 971 ft (296 m)
- Time zone: UTC-6 (Central (CST))
  - Summer (DST): UTC-5 (CDT)
- Area codes: 715 & 534
- GNIS feature ID: 1577582

Eagle Point is an unincorporated community located in the town of Eagle Point, Chippewa County, Wisconsin, United States. Eagle Point is located along the Union Pacific Railroad near Wisconsin Highway 124, 6.5 miles (10.5 km) north of Chippewa Falls.

== History ==
A post office called Eagle Point was established in 1884, and remained in operation until it was discontinued in 1913. The community took its name from the nearby bluff Eagle Point, where a Civil War regiment caught a bald eagle they kept as a military mascot.
