= Eagle Point Park (New Port Richey, Florida) =

Park in Pasco County, Florida

Coordinates: 28.225°N 82.749°W

Eagle Point Park is a public park in Pasco County, Florida. The park is west of US 19 and encompasses 17 acres (69,000 m^{2}) of a 661-acre (2.67 km^{2}) coastal nature preserve. The park includes trails, a canoe and kayak launch dock, playground equipment, three fishing piers, and picnic shelters. It opened in 2010 after six years in planning and construction following the property's being purchased in order to forestall development. Pasco Palms Preserve is adjacent to the park.
