= Sigel, Chippewa County, Wisconsin =

Sigel, Wisconsin
- Town
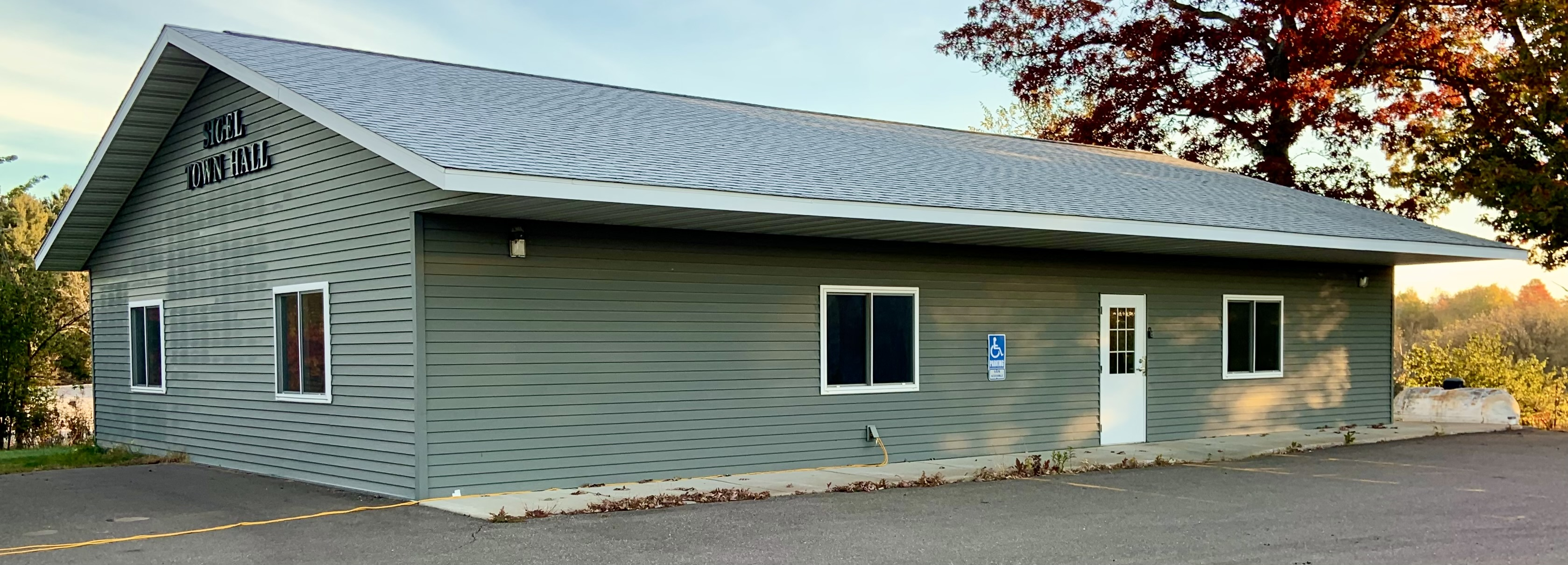
- Town hall

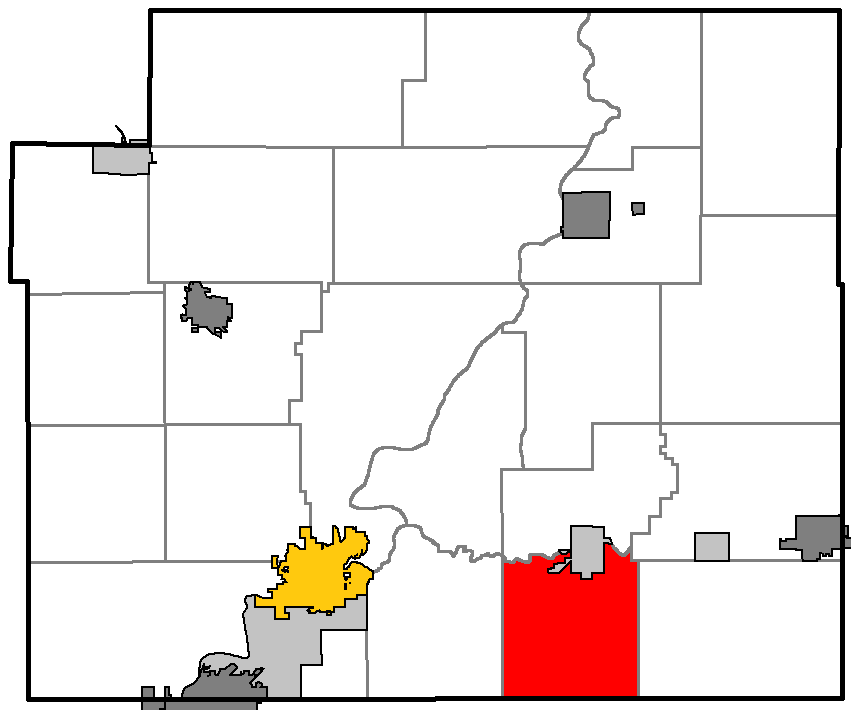
- Location of Sigel within Chippewa County

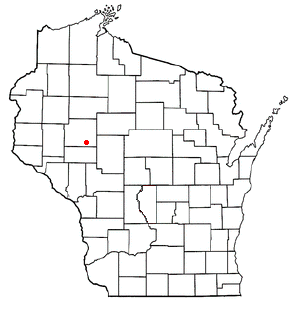
- Location of Sigel, Wisconsin
- Coordinates: 44°54′9″N 91°10′21″W
- Country: United States
- State: Wisconsin
- County: Chippewa

Area
  - Total: 35.8 sq mi (92.8 km^{2})
  - Land: 35.7 sq mi (92.5 km^{2})
  - Water: 0.15 sq mi (0.4 km^{2})
- Elevation: 961 ft (293 m)

Population (2020)
  - Total: 1,132
  - Density: 31.7/sq mi (12.2/km^{2})
- Time zone: UTC-6 (Central (CST))
  - Summer (DST): UTC-5 (CDT)
- Area codes: 715 & 534
- FIPS code: 55-73875
- GNIS feature ID: 1584159
- PLSS township: East half of T28N R6W and west half of T28N R7W

Sigel is a town in Chippewa County in the U.S. state of Wisconsin. The population was 1,132 at the 2020 census, up from 1,044 at the 2010 census.

== History ==
The outlines of the 6-mile squares that would become the Town of Sigel were first surveyed in the fall of 1848 by crews working for the U.S. government. In September 1849 another crew marked all the section corners of that square, walking the woods and swamps on foot, measuring with chain and compass. When done, the deputy surveyor filed this general description of the six-mile square that covers eastern Sigel:

The Surface in this Township is generally level and a fair proportion good fertile soil. It is well watered by numerous small Streams, none of which, however, afford any water power. A large part of the township is well timbered with Birch, Ash, Elm, Lind, Sugar, Oak, Ironwood and Some Pine.

For a surveyor's description of the six mile square that includes the west half of Sigel, see Lafayette.

The town was founded on January 3, 1863, presumably named after Franz Sigel, a colonel in the Union Army during the American Civil War.

== Geography ==
The town of Sigel is located in southern Chippewa County, bordered to the east by the Town of Edson, and to the south by Eau Claire County. It is bordered to the north by the Yellow River and the village of Cadott. The Yellow River is a westward-flowing tributary of the Chippewa River. According to the United States Census Bureau, Sigel has a total area of 35.8 square miles (92.8 km^{2}), of which 35.7 square miles (92.5 km^{2}) is land and 0.2 square miles (0.4 km^{2}), or 0.38%, is water.

== Demographics ==
Historical population
Census	Pop.	Note	%±
1990	736		—
2000	825		12.1%
2010	1,044		26.5%
2020	1,132		8.4%

As of the census of 2000, there were 825 people, 294 households, and 239 families residing in the town. The population density was 23.1 people per square mile (8.9/km^{2}). There were 307 housing units at an average density of 8.6 per square mile (3.3/km^{2}). The racial makeup of the town was 98.18% White, 0.12% African American, 0.48% Native American, 0.24% Asian, 0.24% from other races, and 0.73% from two or more races. Hispanic or Latino of any race were 0.24% of the population.

There were 294 households, out of which 40.1% had children under the age of 18 living with them, 68.0% were married couples living together, 6.8% had a female householder with no husband present, and 18.4% were non-families. 14.6% of all households were made up of individuals, and 4.1% had someone living alone who was 65 years of age or older. The average household size was 2.81 and the average family size was 3.07.

In the town, the population was spread out, with 28.4% under the age of 18, 7.2% from 18 to 24, 26.7% from 25 to 44, 27.6% from 45 to 64, and 10.2% who were 65 years of age or older. The median age was 37 years. For every 100 females, there were 115.4 males. For every 100 females age 18 and over, there were 114.1 males.

The median income for a household in the town was $37,639, and the median income for a family was $40,833. Males had a median income of $28,750 versus $21,071 for females. The per capita income for the town was $15,635. About 5.0% of families and 7.1% of the population were below the poverty line, including 8.3% of those under age 18 and 10.6% of those age 65 or over.

== Education ==
Sigel is served by the School District of Cadott Community.
