= Jim Falls, Wisconsin =

Census-designated place in Wisconsin, United States

- Census-designated place
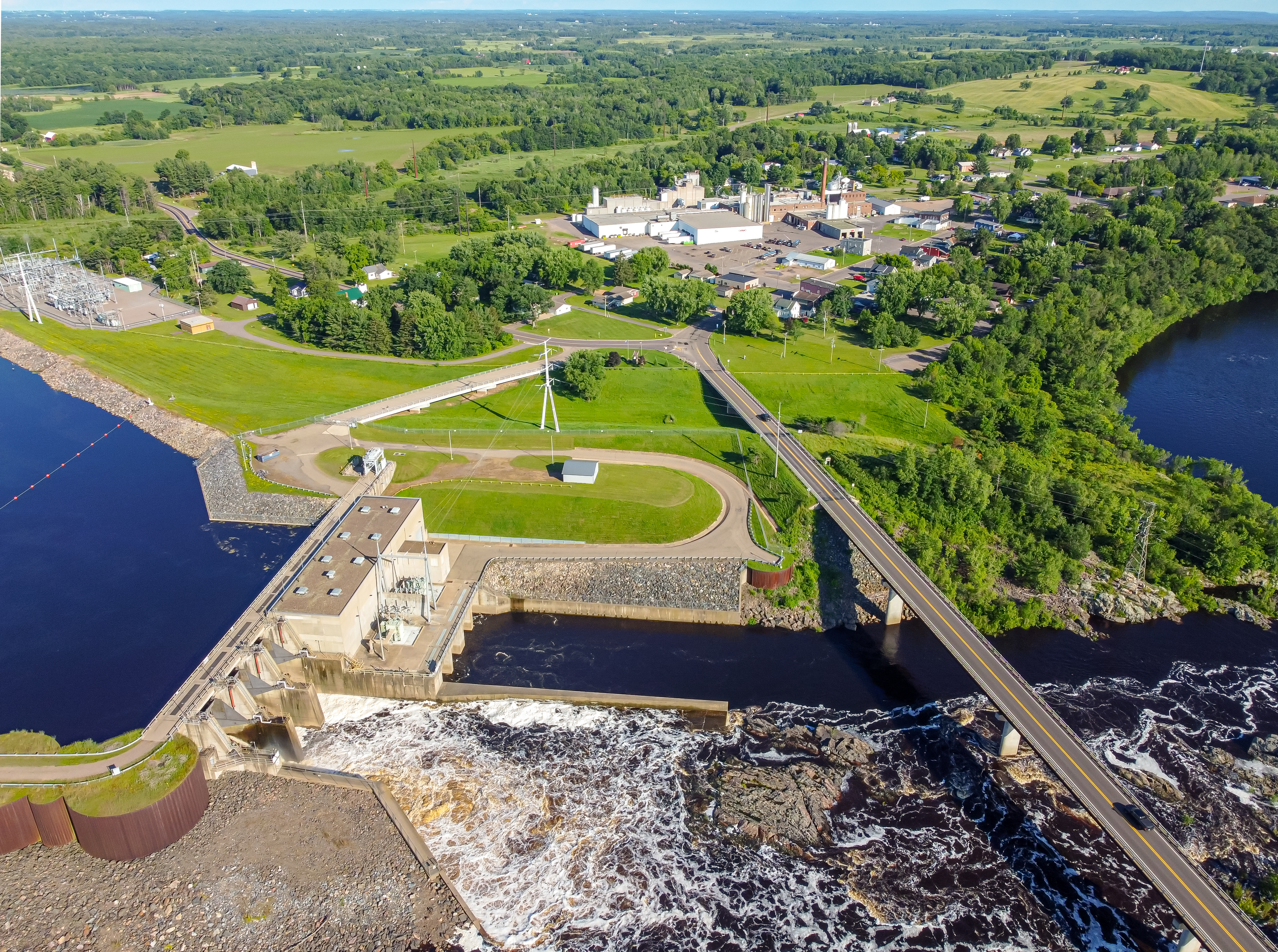

- Location within Wisconsin
- Coordinates: 45°02′43″N 91°16′23″W
- Country: United States
- State: Wisconsin
- County: Chippewa
- Town: Anson

Area
  - Total: 0.735 sq mi (1.90 km^{2})
  - Land: 0.606 sq mi (1.57 km^{2})
  - Water: 0.129 sq mi (0.33 km^{2})
- Elevation: 955 ft (291 m)

Population (2020)
  - Total: 231
  - Density: 381/sq mi (147/km^{2})
- Time zone: UTC-6 (Central (CST))
  - Summer (DST): UTC-5 (CDT)
- ZIP code: 54748
- Area codes: 715 & 534
- GNIS feature ID: 1567178

Jim Falls is a census-designated place located in Chippewa County, Wisconsin, United States. As of the 2020 census, Jim Falls had a population of 231.

== Description ==
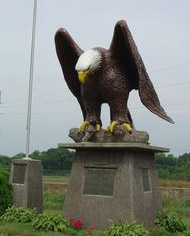
Statue of Old Abe located in Jim Falls on the Old Abe State Trail.

Jim Falls is located on the Chippewa River northeast of Chippewa Falls, in the town of Anson. Jim Falls has a post office with ZIP code 54748. As of the 2010 census, its population was 237.

== History ==
Jim Falls is named in honor of James Ermatinger. In 1840, he established a trading post near the falls, which were then called "Vermillion Falls". Later, he became very involved with public affairs of the village and county. In 1854, he was appointed by the county Board of Supervisors, along with Henry O'Neil, and Daniel McCann, to lay out a road from Chippewa Falls to Vermillion Falls. In 1855, he acted as Justice of the Peace for Chippewa County.

In spring of 1861, the Indian Ahgamahwegezhig captured an eaglet near the South Fork of the Flambeau River, within the present day Chequamegon National Forest, east of Park Falls, Wisconsin. A few weeks later, he canoed down the Chippewa River on a trading expedition. At Jim Falls, he encountered Daniel McCann, to whom he sold the eagle for a bushel of corn. In turn, McCann sold the bird to soldiers of the 8th Wisconsin Volunteer Infantry Regiment. The eagle became their mascot Old Abe, who accompanied them during many battles of the Civil War.

Because of this connection, the reservoir behind the dam is named "Old Abe Lake." Moreover, in a park on the Old Abe State Trail, which runs through the town, a 10½ foot statue of Old Abe has been erected near the dam.

== Demographics ==
Historical population
Census	Pop.	Note	%±
2010	237		—
2020	231		−2.5%

== Geography ==
A stretch of rapids and falls on the Chippewa River provided the focal point around which the town developed. They have been incorporated into a hydroelectric facility operated by Northern States Power Company. However, many geological features of the river bed are visible below the dam.

== See also ==
- Jim Falls Hydroelectric Dam
