= Anson, Wisconsin =

- Town
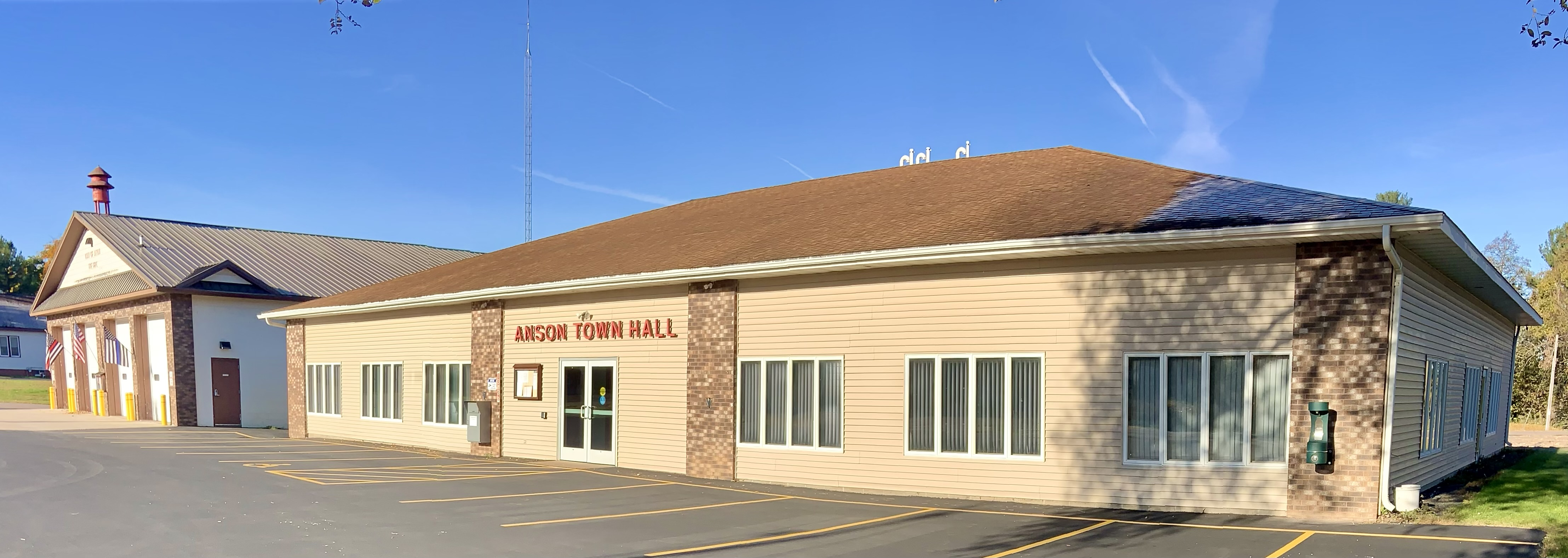
- Town hall

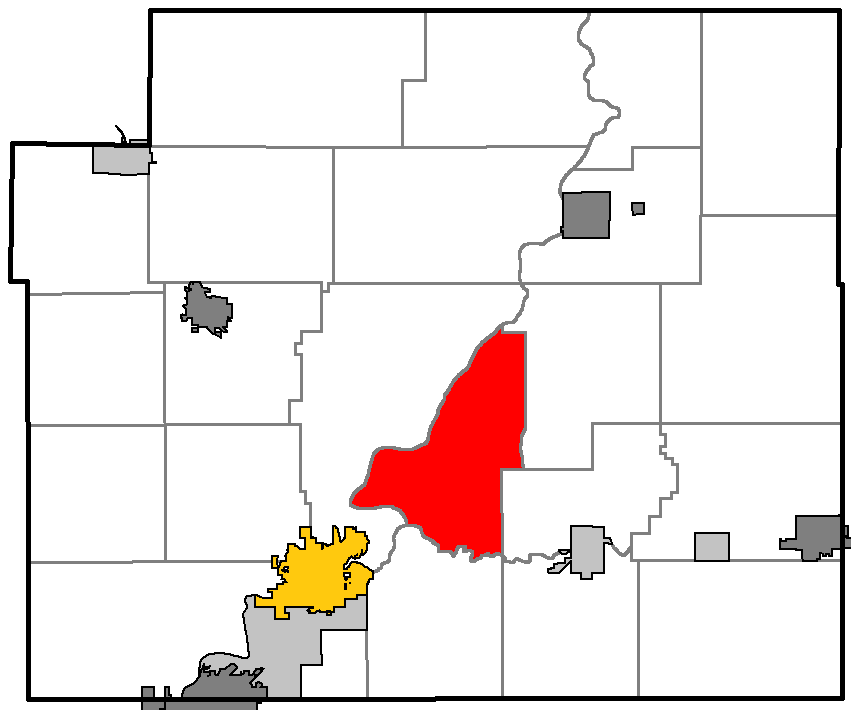
- Location of Anson, within Chippewa County

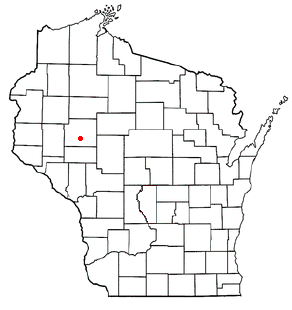
- Location of Anson, Wisconsin
- Coordinates: 45°1′0″N 91°16′39″W
- Country: United States
- State: Wisconsin
- County: Chippewa

Area
  - Total: 39.5 sq mi (102.4 km^{2})
  - Land: 37.4 sq mi (96.9 km^{2})
  - Water: 2.1 sq mi (5.5 km^{2})
- Elevation: 988 ft (301 m)

Population (2020)
  - Total: 2,297
  - Density: 61.4/sq mi (23.7/km^{2})
- Time zone: UTC-6 (Central (CST))
  - Summer (DST): UTC-5 (CDT)
- Area codes: 715 & 534
- FIPS code: 55-02175
- GNIS feature ID: 1582699
- PLSS township: parts of T29N R8W, T29N R7W and T30N R7W
- Website: thetownofanson.com

Anson is a town in Chippewa County in the U.S. state of Wisconsin. The population was 2,297 at the 2020 census. The unincorporated communities of Anson and Jim Falls are located in the town. The town was named after Anson Burlingame, a Massachusetts politician, diplomat and lawyer.

== History ==
The outlines of the 6-mile squares that would become the Town of Anson were first surveyed in the fall of 1848 by crews working for the U.S. government. In August 1849, a crew marked all the section corners, walking the woods and wading the rivers on foot, measuring with chain and compass. When completed, the deputy surveyor filed this general description of the six by six square that contains southeastern Anson, but not the Chippewa river:

In the Northern half of this Town, except a portion of the 5th and all of the west range of Sections, the Surface is flat and the Soil wet and poor. The Southern part generally level, and except in the vicinity of Streams, the Soil is dry and Sandy, as is also part of the 5th and 6th tiers of Sections. Yellow River, which courses through the Southern tier of Sections, is the only Stream in the town upon which there are any Mill Sites, on whose banks are calculated for Such purposes. The banks of the Small Streams are composed of Sand and generally low and the currents Sluggish. There is no Pine timber worthy of note in this town. Tamarack appears to be the prevailing kind, particularly in the North-eastern part. In the remaining portion of the town there are several varieties, viz: Aspen, Birch, Ash, Maple, Elm and Small Pine.

For the surveyors' descriptions of the six by six squares that contain western and northern Anson, see Eagle Point.

== Geography ==
According to the United States Census Bureau, the town has a total area of 39.5 square miles (102 km^{2}), of which 37.4 square miles (97 km^{2}) is land and 2.1 square miles (5.4 km^{2}), or 5.36%, is water.

== Demographics ==
Historical population
| Census | Pop. | Note | %± |
|---|---|---|---|
| 1990 | 1,634 | | — |
| 2000 | 1,881 | | 15.1% |
| 2010 | 2,076 | | 10.4% |
| 2020 | 2,297 | | 10.6% |

As of the census of 2000, there were 1,881 people, 709 households, and 555 families residing in the town. The population density was 50.3 people per square mile (19.4/km^{2}). There were 764 housing units at an average density of 20.4 per square mile (7.9/km^{2}). The racial makeup of the town was 98.99% White, 0.16% Native American, 0.05% Asian, 0.27% from other races, and 0.53% from two or more races. Hispanic or Latino of any race were 0.43% of the population.

There were 709 households, out of which 33.7% had children under the age of 18 living with them, 70.9% were married couples living together, 3.4% had a female householder with no husband present, and 21.7% were non-families. 16.8% of all households were made up of individuals, and 5.4% had someone living alone who was 65 years of age or older. The average household size was 2.65 and the average family size was 2.98.

In the town, the population was spread out, with 25.1% under the age of 18, 6.6% from 18 to 24, 30.8% from 25 to 44, 25.9% from 45 to 64, and 11.4% who were 65 years of age or older. The median age was 39 years. For every 100 females, there were 109.2 males. For every 100 females age 18 and over, there were 108.3 males.

The median income for a household in the town was $46,500, and the median income for a family was $50,865. Males had a median income of $31,781 versus $24,300 for females. The per capita income for the town was $20,845. About 4.3% of families and 3.7% of the population were below the poverty line, including 2.4% of those under age 18 and 3.2% of those age 65 or over.

== Education ==
The town is served by the School District of Cadott Community and the Chippewa Falls Area School District.
