= Eagle Point, Berks County, Pennsylvania =

Unincorporated community in Pennsylvania, US

Eagle Point, Pennsylvania
- Unincorporated community
- Location within Pennsylvania
- Coordinates: 40°32′42″N 75°45′41″W
- Country: United States
- State: Pennsylvania
- County: Berks
- Township: Maxatawny
- Elevation: 443 ft (135 m)
- Time zone: UTC-5 (Eastern (EST))
  - Summer (DST): UTC-4 (EDT)
- Area codes: 610 and 484
- GNIS feature ID: 1173694

Eagle Point is an unincorporated community in Maxatawny Township in Berks County, Pennsylvania, United States. Eagle Point is located at the intersection of Eagle Point and Hottenstein Roads.
