= Marshall =

Marshall may refer to:

== Places ==
=== Australia ===
- Marshall, Victoria, a suburb of Geelong, Victoria
  - Marshall railway station

=== Canada ===
- Marshall, Saskatchewan
- The Marshall, a mountain in British Columbia

=== Liberia ===
- Marshall, Liberia

=== Marshall Islands ===
- Marshall Islands, an island nation in the Pacific Ocean

=== United States of America ===
- Marshall, Alaska
- Marshall, Arkansas
- Marshall, California
- Lotus, California, former name Marshall
- Marshall, Colorado
- Marshall Pass, a mountain pass in Colorado
- Marshall, Illinois
- Marshall, Indiana
- Marshall, Michigan
- Marshall, Minnesota
- Marshall, Missouri
- Marshall, New York
- Marshall, North Carolina
- Marshall, North Dakota
- Marshall, Oklahoma
- Marshall, Texas, the largest U.S. city named Marshall
- Marshall, Virginia
- Marshall, Wisconsin (disambiguation)
  - Marshall, Dane County, Wisconsin
  - Marshall, Richland County, Wisconsin
  - Marshall, Rusk County, Wisconsin
- Marshall County (disambiguation)
- Marshall Township (disambiguation)

== Businesses ==
- Marshall Aerospace and Defence Group, a British aerospace company
- Marshall Amplification, a British music equipment manufacturer
- Marshall Bus, a former British bus manufacturer
- Marshall Pottery, an American producer of red-clay pottery
- Marshall, Sons & Co., a former British agricultural machinery manufacturer, which made Track Marshall.

== Education and government ==
- Marshall College (disambiguation)
- Marshall Space Flight Center, in Huntsville, Alabama, US
- Marshall University, in Huntington, West Virginia, US
- USC Marshall School of Business, at the University of Southern California, US

== Other uses ==
- Marshall Law (TV series), 2002 Australian television series
- Marshall Sandstone, a geologic formation in Michigan
- Marshall (name), a surname and given name, including a list of people with the name
- Marshall (film), a 2017 biographical film about Thurgood Marshall
- USS Marshall, the name of several ships of the US Navy
- "Marshall" by Tlot Tlot, a 1991 version of the song "Under the Water"

== See also ==
- Marshal (disambiguation)
- Marshalling (disambiguation)
- Marshalls (disambiguation)
- Justice Marshall (disambiguation)
- Martial
- Marshall Plan, a 1948 American initiative for foreign aid to Western Europe
  - Marshall Scholarship, for American students in the UK
- We Are Marshall, a 2006 American documentary film
