= Chief Justice Marshall (disambiguation) =

Chief Justice Marshall may refer to:

- John Marshall (1755–1835), chief justice of the United States Supreme Court
- Carrington T. Marshall (1869–1958), chief justice of the Ohio Supreme Court
- Margaret H. Marshall (born 1944), chief justice of the Massachusetts Supreme Judicial Court
- Thomas O. Marshall (1920–2003), chief justice of the Supreme Court of Georgia

== See also ==
- Justice Marshall (disambiguation)
- Judge Marshall (disambiguation)
