= Marshall, Rusk County, Wisconsin =

Marshall, Wisconsin
- Town
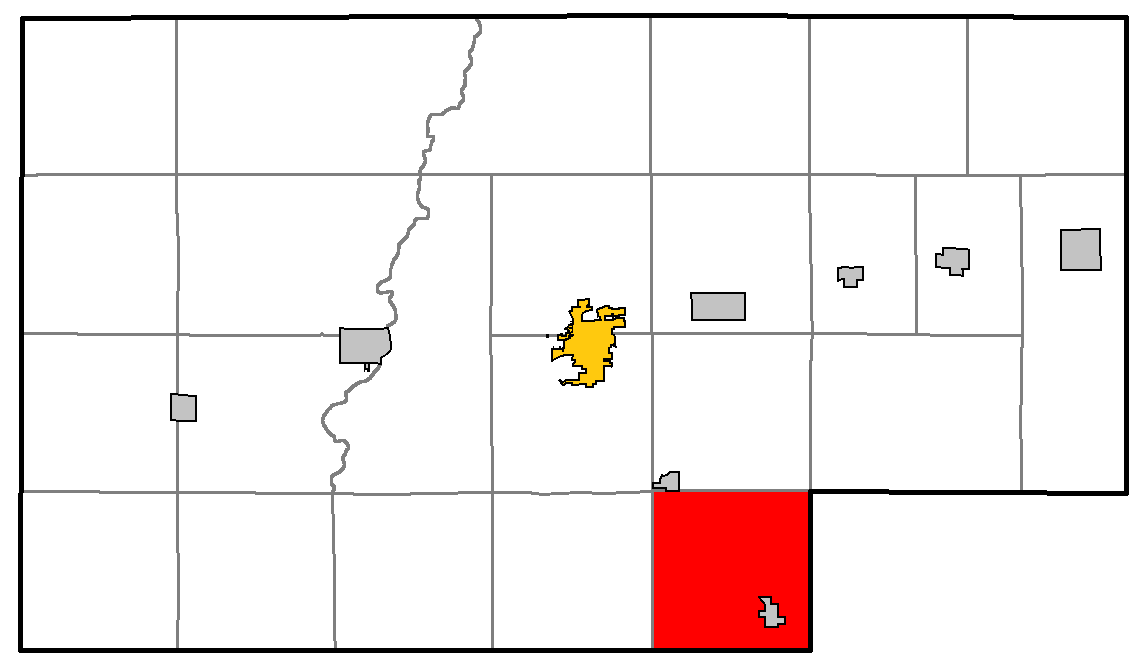
- Location of Marshall within Rusk County

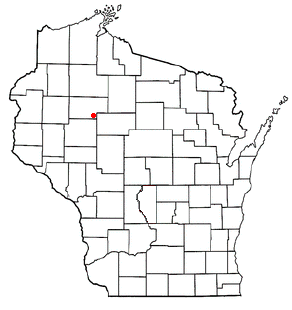
- Location of Marshall, Rusk County, Wisconsin
- Coordinates: 45°20′11″N 90°59′5″W
- Country: United States
- State: Wisconsin
- County: Rusk

Area
  - Total: 35.8 sq mi (92.6 km^{2})
  - Land: 35.8 sq mi (92.6 km^{2})
  - Water: 0 sq mi (0.0 km^{2})
- Elevation: 1,139 ft (347 m)

Population (2020)
  - Total: 664
  - Density: 18.6/sq mi (7.17/km^{2})
- Time zone: UTC-6 (Central (CST))
  - Summer (DST): UTC-5 (CDT)
- Area codes: 715 & 534
- FIPS code: 55-49625
- GNIS feature ID: 1583664
- PLSS township: T33N R5W
- Website: https://www.marshallruskwi.gov/

Marshall is a town in Rusk County, Wisconsin, United States. The population was 664 at the 2020 census. The village of Sheldon lies within the town.

== Geography ==
According to the United States Census Bureau, the town has a total area of 35.8 square miles (92.6 km^{2}) - all land. Marshall's soil is a patchwork of Almena, Auburndale and Spencer silt loams left by the last glacier, with peat soil accumulated in the low places. The Jump River cuts across the southern end of the township.

== History ==
In October 1852 a survey crew working for the U.S. government marked all the section corners in the six mile square which would become Marshall, walking through the woods and swamps, measuring with chain and compass. When done, the deputy surveyors filed this general description:

This Township contains some Tamarac Swamp, all of which is unfit for cultivation. Some Hay meadow from which Hay may be cut. The Surface is generally level. That(?) that may be considered upland, and Compare favourably with 2nd(?) rate land in(?) any(?) Country. Covered with white and yellow Birch, Sugar, Maple, Elm, Ash And some Pine, some places Hemlock mostly.

An 1880 map of the area shows logging well under way. In 1878 the Mississippi River Logging Company had built a large dam twelve miles downstream on the Chippewa at what is now Holcombe. A tote road from Cornell (then called Brunett) passed up through the west end what would become Marshall, following the east side of Main Creek. Another tote road from Cornell stopped at the south edge of what would become Marshall at the Jump River near the future County G bridge.

A later map, from 1901, shows the area when Rusk County was called Gates and Marshall was still part of a large town of Dewey. The map shows one wagon road in the town, entering from Chippewa County on the south edge, crossing the river, and passing Fern Post Office. Then the road followed the future Cemetery Road and County V to the north end of Marshall. About a dozen settlers' homesteads were sprinkled along this road. Away from the road and the Little Jump, most of the land was still in large blocks, with the largest landholders Cornell University, Fitch Gilbert and Keith Brothers on the west, Northwestern Lumber Company on the east, and James L. Gates, who speculated in pinelands and sold the cutover lands to farmers.

A later plat map (date uncertain, but no later than 1905) shows more wagon roads and more settlers. One road ran west from Fern, roughly paralleling the river to the west edge of modern Marshall. Another predecessor of Marshall Road reached two miles east of Cemetery Road. Another short road reached east a quarter mile from the modern County V to a sawmill on the Little Jump River. More settlers were scattered along these roads, plus a few out near the corner of Market and Poplar, where no road was yet marked on the map. By this time Cornell University and Fitch Gilbert had sold their large blocks, mostly to John S. Owen and J.L. Gates Land Co.

The previous maps show no development where Sheldon would be. Around 1905 the J.S. Owen Company built a new rail line for the Wisconsin Central Railroad, heading northwest from Wisconsin Rapids for Ladysmith and ultimately Superior - now the Canadian National Railway. This rail line cut across Marshall diagonally, crossing the Jump River a mile east of Fern. The Wisconsin Central built a depot and section house on the north bank of the river and called the station "Sheldon." Within a few years the post office, saloon and general store had moved from Fern to Sheldon, near the station.

A 1914 plat map of Marshall shows the Soo Line Railroad crossing the town, with Sheldon on the north side of the river. Wagon roads had extended further, with more settlers. One rural school was out by Fern across from Meadowbrook Cemetery. Another was three miles north of Sheldon on what is now County V. Another was five miles northwest on Elm Road and another where County G now crosses the river. By this time west of the railroad was largely settled. Much of the east was in large blocks owned by the Owen Lumber Company. Other large landholders were the Faast Land Company and Northern Wisconsin Seed.

== Demographics ==
As of the census of 2000, there were 683 people, 210 households, and 170 families residing in the town. The population density was 19.1 people per square mile (7.4/km^{2}). There were 228 housing units at an average density of 6.4 per square mile (2.5/km^{2}). The racial makeup of the town was 95.90% White, 0.15% African American, 2.34% Native American, 0.59% from other races, and 1.02% from two or more races. Hispanic or Latino of any race were 1.02% of the population.

There were 210 households, out of which 43.3% had children under the age of 18 living with them, 67.1% were married couples living together, 7.1% had a female householder with no husband present, and 18.6% were non-families. 15.7% of all households were made up of individuals, and 10.0% had someone living alone who was 65 years of age or older. The average household size was 3.25 and the average family size was 3.63.

In the town, the population was spread out, with 38.9% under the age of 18, 5.4% from 18 to 24, 26.5% from 25 to 44, 15.4% from 45 to 64, and 13.8% who were 65 years of age or older. The median age was 31 years. For every 100 females, there were 95.1 males. For every 100 females age 18 and over, there were 101.4 males.

The median income for a household in the town was $33,281, and the median income for a family was $36,319. Males had a median income of $25,729 versus $21,094 for females. The per capita income for the town was $11,411. About 13.8% of families and 16.9% of the population were below the poverty line, including 19.3% of those under age 18 and 14.4% of those age 65 or over.
