= Marshalls (disambiguation) =

Marshalls is a chain of US department stores.

Marshalls may also refer to:

- Marshall Islands
- Marshalls plc, construction materials company
- Marshalls (house)

== See also ==
- Marshal
- Marshal (disambiguation)
- Marshall (disambiguation)
