= Marshall, Wisconsin =

Marshall is the name of some places in the U.S. state of Wisconsin:

- Marshall, Dane County, Wisconsin, a village
- Marshall, Richland County, Wisconsin, a town
- Marshall, Rusk County, Wisconsin, a town

== See also ==
- Marshall (disambiguation)
