= Marshall micropolitan area =

The Marshall micropolitan area may refer to:

- The Marshall, Minnesota micropolitan area, United States
- The Marshall, Missouri micropolitan area, United States
- The Marshall, Texas micropolitan area, United States

== See also ==
- Marshall (disambiguation)
