= Sheldon, Rusk County, Wisconsin =

Sheldon, Wisconsin
- Village
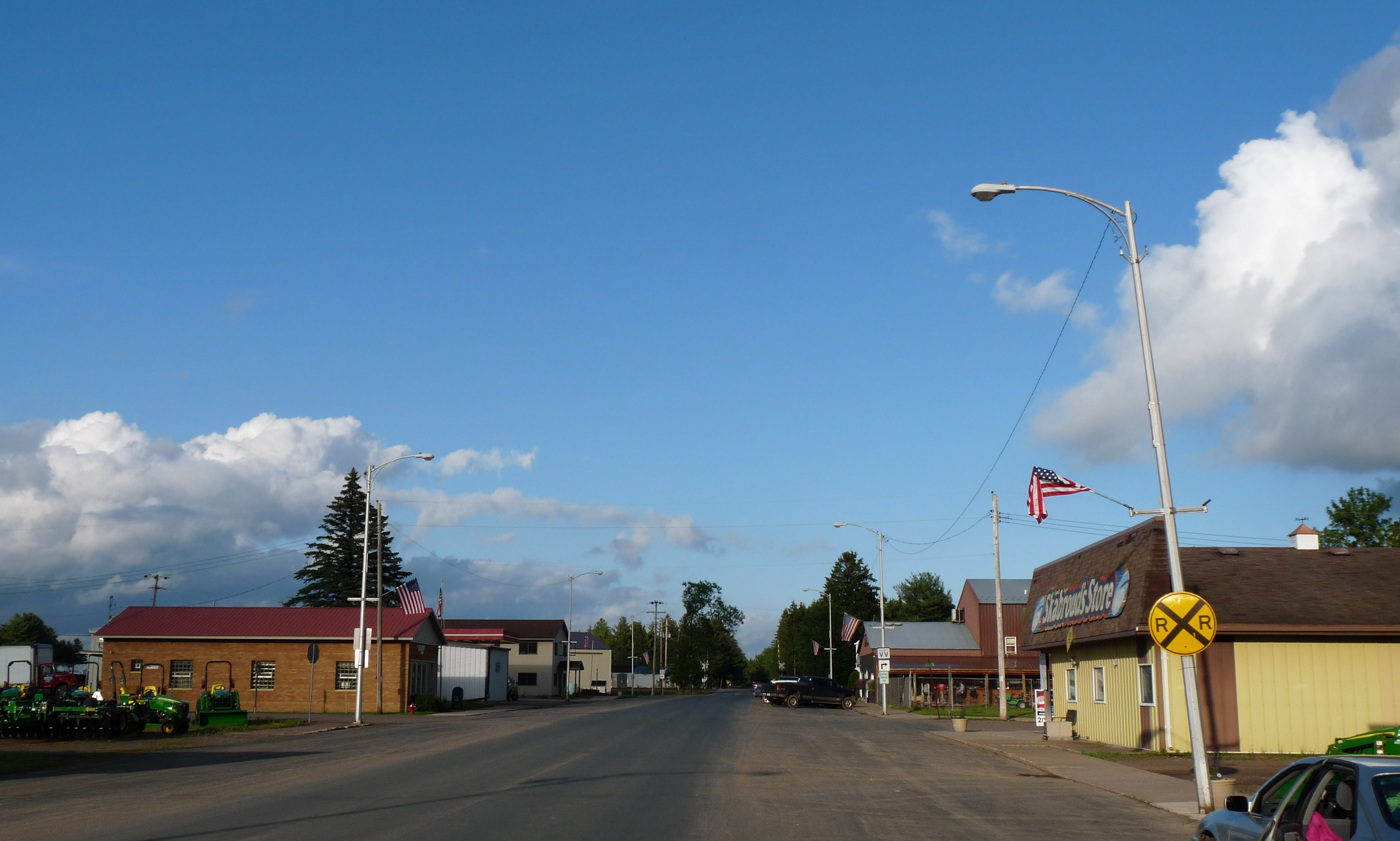
- On main street, facing east

- Location of Sheldon in Rusk County, Wisconsin.
- Coordinates: 45°18′37″N 90°57′32″W
- Country: United States
- State: Wisconsin
- County: Rusk

Area
  - Total: 0.66 sq mi (1.72 km^{2})
  - Land: 0.66 sq mi (1.72 km^{2})
  - Water: 0 sq mi (0.00 km^{2})
- Elevation: 1,122 ft (342 m)

Population (2020)
  - Total: 261
  - Density: 393/sq mi (152/km^{2})
- Time zone: UTC-6 (Central (CST))
  - Summer (DST): UTC-5 (CDT)
- Area codes: 715 & 534
- FIPS code: 55-73175
- GNIS feature ID: 1574003
- Website: https://villageofsheldonwi.gov/

Sheldon is a village in Rusk County, Wisconsin, United States. The population was 261 at the 2020 census.

== History ==
Around 1885 a few pioneer families named Marshal, Sergeant and Carman settled in the brush a mile west of Sheldon's current location, in a hamlet they called "Fern." Anton Corbine carried mail in to them from Flambeau Farm (where the Flambeau River joins the Chippewa) by foot or by horse. Other settlers followed. Woodlawn Cemetery was started in 1903 with the burial of Mrs. Alice Elmendorf (aged 65 years). A little log school stood just south of it, and a Rev. Willam would sometimes follow the trails up from Huron to lead worship in the school. In 1905 Max Dietze from Hawkins built a general store east of the cemetery, supplied by driving a wagon with horses across the Jump and along logging roads to Holcombe or Chippewa. In 1906 D. L. Pickering built a sawmill on the bank of Little Jump River.

Sheldon itself began to take form in 1906 when the Owen and Northern Railway, working for the Wisconsin Central Railroad, built its line a mile east of Fern, over the Jump and through the woods on its way to Superior. (That rail line still exists as the modern Canadian National line.) During the spring flood, ice and logs floating down the river toppled the temporary supports for the bridge that was under construction and it crashed into the river. After regrouping from that setback, the railroad built a depot just north of the river, with a section house and water tank for its trains, and named the station "Sheldon," after one of its officials. That same year Ed Lacy built a general store across from the depot, later known as Brown's store, then Mau's. In 1907 Bill Huggins moved his saloon from Fern into Sheldon. Max Dietz also moved his general store from near the cemetery in to town. Eventually all businesses and schools moved, until now all that remains out by Fern is farms, homes, and the cemetery.

In 1908 Sheldon was platted, and that year a land office opened. By 1910 a new 8-grade school was built in town. The town had a barber shop and two saloons - one with a dance hall upstairs. It had two hotels: the Hotel Walter and the Sheldon House. They mainly housed lumber workers. Logging was the big business then, with the John S. Owen Company logging north of town. In town, several mills sawed boards, including the Jump River Lumber Company's mill, which employed more than forty men until it burned in 1912. These mills produced boards mostly for local use, but Pickering's lath mill shipped out its product on the railroad. A train stopped once a day, heading north one day and south the next, and carrying passengers of course, since the roads were terrible. Herb Duel, Sr. installed the first telephones in 1910, with a switchboard in the Hotel Walter. Lacy brought the first car, a 1909 Ford, to town in 1910. In 1917 the village of Sheldon was incorporated, with population 123.

By 1923 Sheldon's industry included the lath mill, a creamery supplied by local farmers, and a factory that made hoops for butter tubs from local ash wood. The town had a bank, a predecessor of the Dairyland State Bank. And sidewalks were built along Main Street. Electricity came to town in 1930. In 1938 the WPA helped build sidewalks alongside streets.

The town had its setbacks. Logging gradually waned, but dairy grew. Prohibition in 1915 shut down the saloons for a while. In 1920 a pool hall and other buildings burned. In 1923 the school burned, but classes shifted to Tupper's Hotel, the bank, the Lutheran church, and a lumber company warehouse, and a new school was ready in 1925. The Sheldon Woman's Club established a library in 1933, which burned in the early 1940s, but was reestablished. In the Labor Day flood of 1941 the Jump River wrecked the road bridge on the south side of town, damaged the railroad bridge, and destroyed buildings. The bridges were rebuilt, but not all buildings. Pickering's lath mill burned in 1947, but was reconstructed for sawing and planing.

By 1959 the Soo Line was stopping twice a day, providing passenger, freight and mail service, and Sheldon's population was 300. The town had two or three grocery stores, a few garages, the creamery, two feed mills, some implement dealers, and a lumber yard, but no sawmill. Sheldon had made the transition from lumber-processing to providing services for the surrounding dairy farms.

== Geography ==
Sheldon is located at 45°18′37″N 90°57′32″W (45.310258, -90.958820).

According to the United States Census Bureau, the village has a total area of 0.66 square miles (1.71 km^{2}), all land. The village is located on the north bank of the Jump River.

== Demographics ==
Historical population
Census	Pop.	Note	%±
1920	123		—
1930	161		30.9%
1940	199		23.6%
1950	271		36.2%
1960	240		−11.4%
1970	218		−9.2%
1980	292		33.9%
1990	268		−8.2%
2000	256		−4.5%
2010	237		−7.4%
2020	261		10.1%
U.S. Decennial Census

=== 2010 census ===
As of the census of 2010, there were 237 people, 116 households, and 67 families residing in the village. The population density was 359.1 inhabitants per square mile (138.6/km^{2}). There were 126 housing units at an average density of 190.9 per square mile (73.7/km^{2}). The racial makeup of the village was 96.2% White, 1.7% Native American, 1.7% from other races, and 0.4% from two or more races. Hispanic or Latino of any race were 5.5% of the population.

There were 116 households, of which 17.2% had children under the age of 18 living with them, 45.7% were married couples living together, 9.5% had a female householder with no husband present, 2.6% had a male householder with no wife present, and 42.2% were non-families. 36.2% of all households were made up of individuals, and 12.9% had someone living alone who was 65 years of age or older. The average household size was 2.04 and the average family size was 2.64.

The median age in the village was 48.4 years. 18.1% of residents were under the age of 18; 5.9% were between the ages of 18 and 24; 22.4% were from 25 to 44; 33.4% were from 45 to 64; and 20.3% were 65 years of age or older. The gender makeup of the village was 48.9% male and 51.1% female.

=== 2000 census ===
As of the census of 2000, there were 256 people, 114 households, and 63 families residing in the village. The population density was 387.1 people per square mile (149.8/km^{2}). There were 123 housing units at an average density of 186.0 per square mile (72.0/km^{2}). The racial makeup of the village was 99.61% White, 0.39% from other races.

There were 114 households, out of which 28.9% had children under the age of 18 living with them, 42.1% were married couples living together, 8.8% had a female householder with no husband present, and 43.9% were non-families. 36.0% of all households were made up of individuals, and 17.5% had someone living alone who was 65 years of age or older. The average household size was 2.25 and the average family size was 2.95.

In the village, the population was spread out, with 24.2% under the age of 18, 5.9% from 18 to 24, 24.6% from 25 to 44, 27.7% from 45 to 64, and 17.6% who were 65 years of age or older. The median age was 42 years. For every 100 females, there were 81.6 males. For every 100 females age 18 and over, there were 84.8 males.

The median income for a household in the village was $28,125, and the median income for a family was $33,125. Males had a median income of $29,375 versus $20,781 for females. The per capita income for the village was $13,562. About 15.4% of families and 13.9% of the population were below the poverty line, including 10.4% of those under the age of eighteen and 21.3% of those 65 or over.

== See also ==
- List of villages in Wisconsin
