= Marshal (disambiguation) =

A marshal is a holder of various military, law-enforcement, and other positions.

Marshal may also refer to:

== Role or profession ==
- Marshal (university), a university official in Sri Lanka
- Marshal of the air force and Air marshal, senior air force officer ranks
- Field marshal, a senior army officer rank
- Fire marshal, a fire safety inspector
- Motorsport marshal, a motor racing steward
- Sky marshal, a covert law enforcement agent on board an aircraft
- U.S. Marshal, of the United States Marshals Service

== People ==
- Marshal (surname), including a list of people with the name

== Arts, entertainment and media ==
=== Fictional characters ===
- Marshal (Dungeons & Dragons), a character in the role-playing game
- Marshal (chess piece), a fairy chess piece
- Cobb Vanth, the titular character of the episode "Chapter 9: The Marshal" of the TV series The Mandalorian
- The Marshal, a Sontaran appearing in the Doctor Who sci-fi episode, "The Sontaran Experiment"

=== Film ===
- Marshal (2019 film), a Telugu language thriller film

=== Television ===
- The Marshal, a 1995 American TV show
- "Chapter 9: The Marshal", an episode of The Mandalorian
- Marshals (TV series), an American television show

=== Other uses ===
- The Marshal, a 1912 book by Mary Raymond Shipman Andrews

== See also ==
- Marshall (disambiguation)
- Marshalling (disambiguation)
- Martial (disambiguation)
