= Lake Holcombe, Wisconsin =

- Town
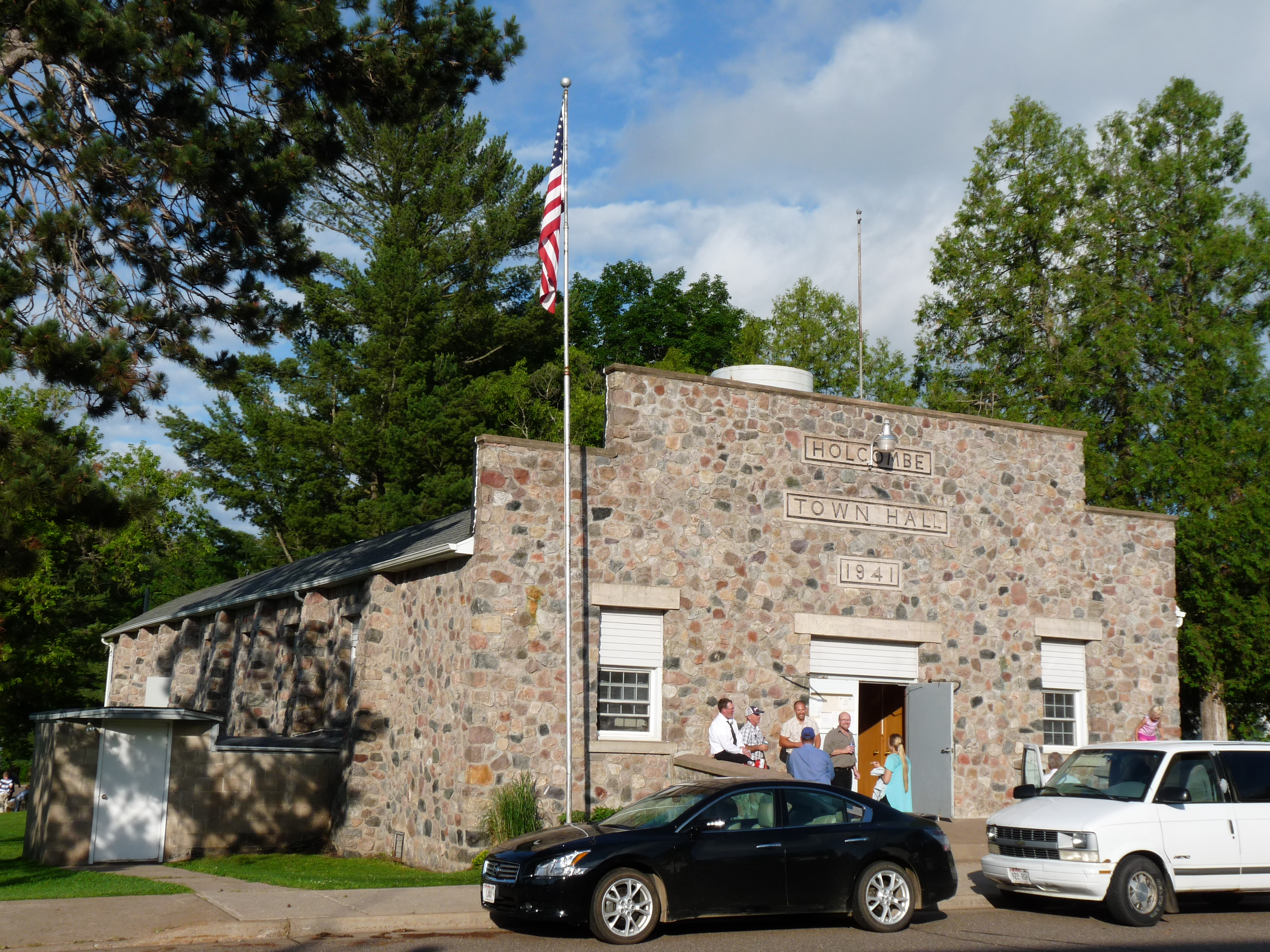
- Town Hall

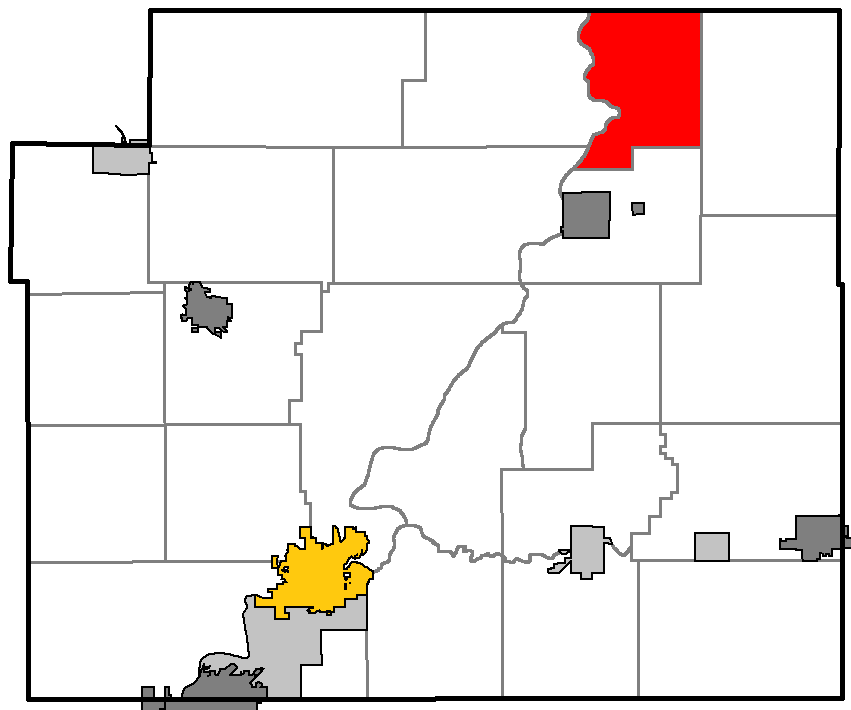
- Location of Lake Holcombe, within Chippewa County

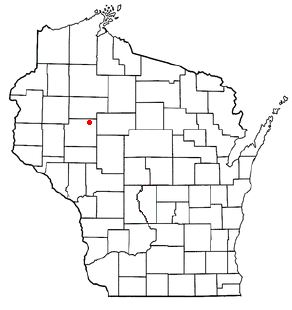
- Location of Lake Holcombe, Wisconsin
- Coordinates: 45°14′52″N 91°6′7″W
- Country: United States
- State: Wisconsin
- County: Chippewa

Area
  - Total: 30.6 sq mi (79.3 km^{2})
  - Land: 26.6 sq mi (69.0 km^{2})
  - Water: 4.0 sq mi (10.4 km^{2})
- Elevation: 1,056 ft (322 m)

Population (2020)
  - Total: 1,011
  - Density: 37.9/sq mi (14.7/km^{2})
- Time zone: UTC-6 (Central (CST))
  - Summer (DST): UTC-5 (CDT)
- Area codes: 715 & 534
- FIPS code: 55-41550
- GNIS feature ID: 1583512
- PLSS township: Most of T32N R6W and a bit of T31N R6W
- Website: https://www.townoflakeholcombe.com/

Lake Holcombe is also a popular name for the Holcombe Flowage.

Lake Holcombe is a town in Chippewa County in the U.S. state of Wisconsin. Its population was 1,011 at the 2020 census. The census-designated place of Holcombe is located in the town.

== History ==
The six-mile squares that would become Lake Holcombe were surveyed in June, 1852 by crews working for the U.S. government. Later that year, another crew marked all the section corners, walking through the woods and wading the rivers, measuring with chain and compass. When done, the deputy surveyor filed this general description:

This Township contains a few(?) small Cedar & Tamarac Swamp, All unfit for cultivation. The surface is generally level, soil second rate and most of (?) fit for cultivation. The Township is covered with timber mostly Pine, Hemlock, Tamarac, Cedar and some Sugar Birch and Maple. The Chippewa River runs in a southerly direction through the west part of the Township and Fisher River runs through the South East part Both of the streams have a rapid current and furnish good motive power for Mills.

=== Logging era ===
During the 1800s, when there were no roads or railroads in the Chippewa valley, rivers were the only means for long distance transport of logs. A great forest lay in northern Wisconsin, and almost all the logs cut on the upper Chippewa, the Flambeau and the Jump rivers were driven down through what is now the Town of Lake Holcombe on the Chippewa River. Above the modern dam and beneath the modern Holcombe Flowage was a rapids called Little Falls where before 1878 lumberjacks toiled to keep their logs from jamming on their way to sawmills in Chippewa Falls and Eau Claire.

In 1878, to better manage the driving of logs on the river, Chippewa River Improvement and Log Driving Company built a log driving dam north of the modern County M bridge. The lumber companies built many dams along the Chippewa and its tributaries but this one, designed by Elijah Swift and Joseph Viles, was huge - 625 feet (191 m) wide and 16 feet (4.9 m) high. It was said at that time to be the largest wooden dam in the world. Previous to dams like this, the lumber companies depended on natural floods to raise the rivers to move logs. The rivers were often low by mid-summer, and some springs brought no flood, so the cut logs couldn't reach the mills. Using "splash" or "flood" dams like the one at Little Falls, lumber companies could control the water level downstream and drive logs all summer. The Little Falls dam had 32 flood gates, a gate to sluice logs through, and a gate for the wanigan (cookhouse raft) to pass through. Once the dam was built, the company tested it by closing all flood gates for five days to build up water, then opening 20 of them and letting the water flow. After 24 hours of this, the water downstream at Eau Claire had risen 4.5 feet (1.4 m) and at Durand 3 feet (0.91 m).

The company maintained a little settlement/farm near the dam on the west side of the river, which served as a staging area for logging operations, and housed a dam keeper. The journal of the dam's keeper from 1882 to 1890 still survives, briefly describing log drives and jams and the flood of 1884. These entries from October of 1882 give an idea of activities at the dam:

- Oct. 4: Rain fall 2 in. lasting six hours. Wind S.E.
- Oct. 5: McLeod with orders shut down gates. Rain fall ¼ in. lasting three hours Wind S.W.
- Oct. 6: Crew came in from road. Commenced sluicing. Pitch with load of lumber. Brought down boats from Flambeau 14 in all.
- Oct. 8: Rain fall 1½ in. lasting six hours.
- Oct. 9: Drawed water down. Opened big roal.
- Oct. 10: Shut down for fresh head.
- Oct. 11: Louis Mischler with 36 men to drive. Got kit at Little Falls including boats. Run wanigan over big roal. Full head on.

A flood in 1880 washed out the east embankment of the dam, pushed logs through, and created a mess downstream. When the embankment was rebuilt, the dam was made five feet taller. Another flood in September of 1884 washed out much of the dam. Frederick Weyerhaeuser immediately decided to rebuild it, enlisting the aid of dam engineer Billy "the beaver" England. The rebuilt dam withstood floods and continued to push logs down the river for twenty-five years until log drives ended.

With steady activity around the dam, a community began to form. The part northeast of the dam was called "Barney Town" for businessman Adolph Bernier. In 1902, with the Omaha railroad approaching from the south, Bernier platted a village called Little Falls there. But Bernier and the railroad couldn't agree on a land price, so the railroad platted its own village a bit to the south, called Holcombe. The name was chosen by the general manager of the railroad - naming the station for his friend. A Holcombe post office opened in 1902, Holcombe grew, and most of the buildings in Barney Town were eventually moved or torn down.

Log drives were dangerous. The worst incident on the whole Chippewa occurred on July 5, 1905 at Little Falls. Logs had jammed right below the dam. Chippewa Lumber and Boom assembled a crew to tackle the jam. Arriving on the morning train from Chippewa Falls, sixteen men jumped into a bateau designed for eight and rowed out to the jam. Something went wrong and instead of landing on the jam, the bateau overturned and thirteen men were dumped into the fast water. Three had jumped onto the log jam. Eight men went out in another bateau to rescue the three and also capsized. Six of those men got onto the jam, but two were swept downstream and managed to reach shore. After seeing the two bateaux capsize, the other sixty log drivers on shore were stunned, unsure what to do. But the two wet men who had reached shore were not immobilized. They rowed another bateau out to the jam and brought the nine men back in two trips. In total, eleven of the men who were dumped in the river drowned on that one day. Their bodies were found as far downstream as Chippewa Falls. Local folklore has it that the river deposited each near his own farm or home.

Log drives ended in 1911 because power dams were being built downstream at Cornell and Jim Falls. For a while after, some logs were still driven down the upper rivers to the dam, then loaded onto rail cars at Holcombe and shipped by train, but the good pine was dwindling. Neglected, the old log driving dam probably washed out in the 1920s.

=== Modern times ===
The current hydroelectric dam was built in 1950 by the Wisconsin-Minnesota Light and Power Company, producing the Holcombe Flowage. The flowage is a popular recreation area, with homes, cottages and campgrounds thick along some of its shores.

== Geography ==
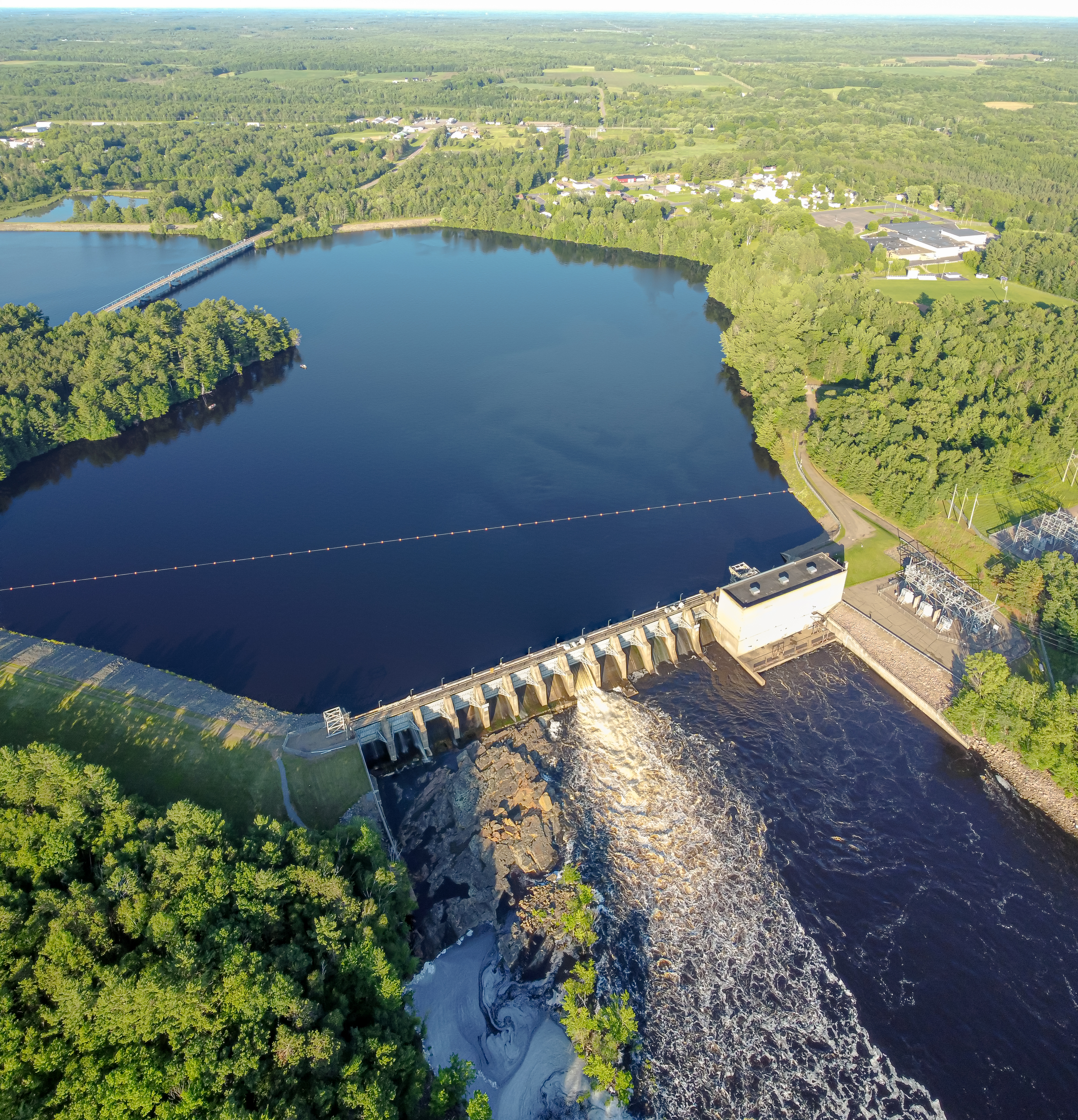
Holcombe Hydro Dam

The town of Lake Holcombe is roughly a 6-mile (10 km) by 6 mile square, except that the west end is cut off by the Chippewa River, and a few square miles are added in the southwest. The Holcombe Flowage ("Lake Holcombe") takes up the northern part of the town's western boundary, impounding the Chippewa River itself but also extending east across the northern part of the town where the Jump River enters. According to the United States Census Bureau, the town has a total area of 30.6 square miles (79.3 km^{2}), of which 26.6 square miles (69.0 km^{2}) is land and 4.0 square miles (10.4 km^{2}), or 13.07%, is water.

== Demographics ==
Historical population
Census	Pop.	Note	%±
1990	920		—
2000	1,010		9.8%
2010	1,031		2.1%
2020	1,011		−1.9%

As of the census of 2000, there were 1,010 people, 413 households, and 292 families residing in the town. The population density was 37.5 people per square mile (14.5/km^{2}). There were 548 housing units at an average density of 20.4 per square mile (7.9/km^{2}). The racial makeup of the town was 98.71% White, 0.50% Native American, 0.40% Asian, 0.10% from other races, and 0.30% from two or more races. Hispanic or Latino of any race were 0.79% of the population.

There were 413 households, out of which 26.9% had children under the age of 18 living with them, 61.0% were married couples living together, 6.3% had a female householder with no husband present, and 29.1% were non-families. 24.5% of all households were made up of individuals, and 10.7% h ad someone living alone who was 65 years of age or older. The average household size was 2.40 and the average family size was 2.80.

In the town, the population was spread out, with 23.8% under the age of 18, 5.3% from 18 to 24, 23.7% from 25 to 44, 30.2% from 45 to 64, and 17.0% who were 65 years of age or older. The median age was 43 years. For every 100 females, there were 98.8 males. For every 100 females age 18 and over, there were 99.0 males.

The median income for a household in the town was $33,083, and the median income for a family was $37,500. Males had a median income of $26,905 versus $18,750 for females. The per capita income for the town was $15,900. About 5.5% of families and 10.2% of the population were below the poverty line, including 10.6% of those under age 18 and 9.1% of those age 65 or over.
