= Chippewa River Bottoms =

Hardwood forest in Wisconsin, United States

Coordinates: 44.766°N 91.700°W

Chippewa River Bottoms is a bottomland hardwood forest in Buffalo County, Wisconsin. It is the largest single stand of bottomland hardwood forest along the Chippewa River. Additionally, it is home to a large great blue heron rookery. The site was designated a National Natural Landmark in 1973.
