= Marshalling =

Marshalling may refer to:

== Activity ==
- Marshalling (computer science)
- Marshalling (heraldry)
- Marshalling, the activity conducted in a railway marshalling yard
- Marshalling area, a location in the vicinity of a reception terminal or pre-positioned equipment storage site where arriving unitpersonnel, equipment, materiel, and accompanying supplies are reassembled, returned to the control of the unit commander, and prepared for onward movement.
- Aircraft marshalling
- Motorsport marshaling
- Marshalling, the switchgear in which the signals from the field instrumentation are collected before the connection to the DCS (grouping of I/O).

== Law ==
- Doctrine of Marshalling - an equitable concept in the law

== See also ==
- Marshal (disambiguation)
- Marshall (disambiguation)
