= Holcombe Flowage =

Reservoir in Chippewa and Rusk counties, Wisconsin

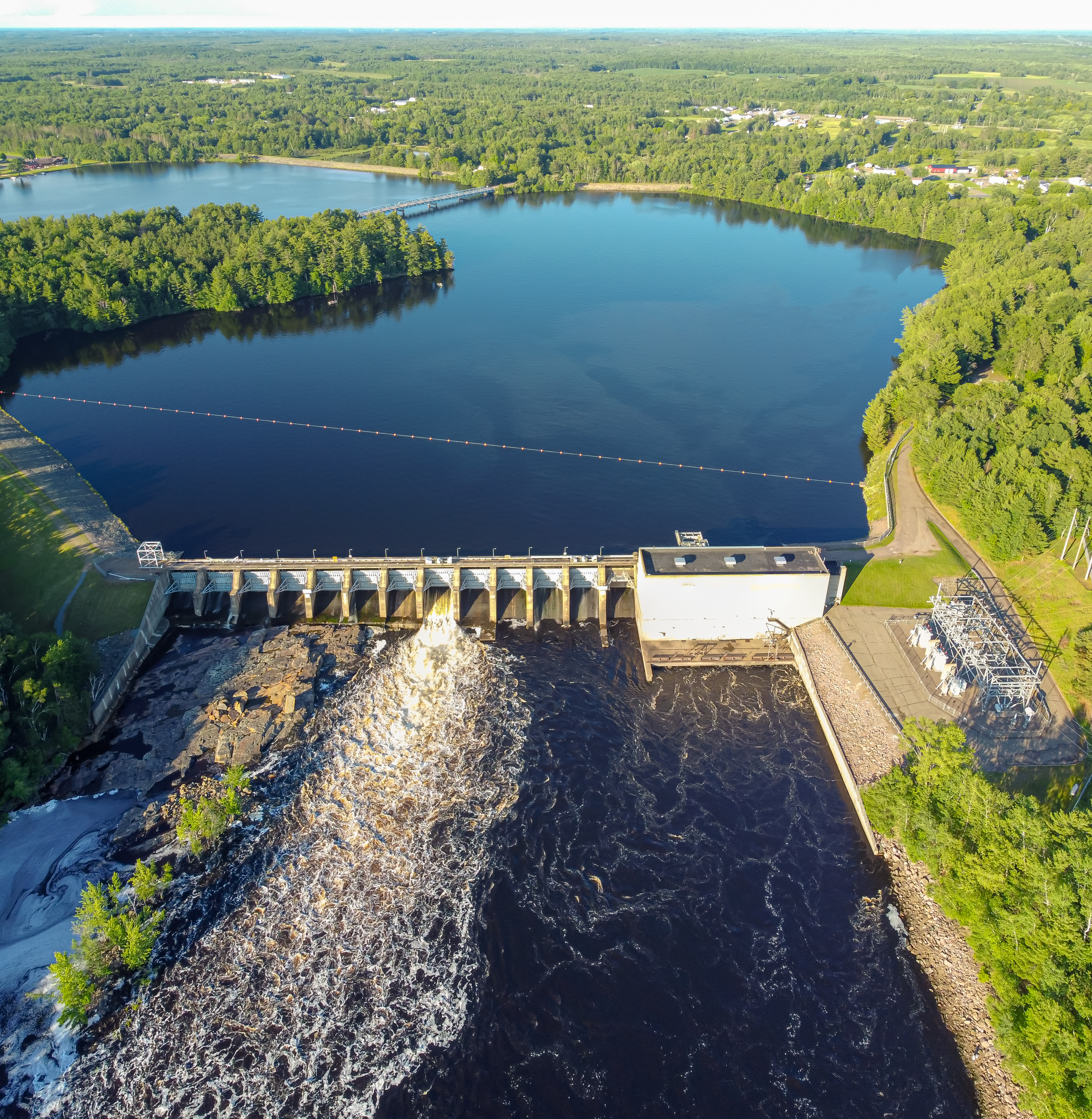

- Location within Wisconsin
- Interactive map of Holcombe Flowage
- Location: Chippewa and Rusk County, Wisconsin
- Coordinates: 45°14′50″N 91°08′54″W
- Type: Reservoir
- River sources: Chippewa River
- Basin countries: United States
- First flooded: 1878
- Surface area: 2,881 acres (1,166 ha)
- Average depth: 12 feet (3.7 m)
- Max. depth: 61 feet (19 m)
- Water volume: 47,000 acre⋅ft (58,000,000 m^{3})
- Surface elevation: 1,047 feet (319 m)
- Settlements: Holcombe, Wisconsin
- References: U.S. Geological Survey Geographic Names Information System: Holcombe Flowage

Holcombe Flowage is a reservoir on the Chippewa River in Chippewa County and Rusk County, Wisconsin. The dam stands between the towns of Birch Creek and Lake Holcombe, just west of the settlement of Holcombe, Wisconsin, in Chippewa County, where most of the reservoir lies. A small part of the reservoir also extends northward into the Town of Willard in Rusk County.

The flowage is a popular recreation area, and the shores are thick with homes and cottages. It covers 2,881 acres (1,166 ha) at an average depth of 12 feet (3.7 m), a maximum depth of 61 feet (19 m), and a volume of just under 47,000 acre-feet (58,000,000 m^{3}).

== Holcombe Dam ==
Holcombe Dam
- Interactive map of Holcombe Dam
- Official name: Holcombe Dam
- Country: United States
- Location: Chippewa and Rusk County, Wisconsin
- Coordinates: 45°13′29″N 91°07′41″W
- Purpose: Power
- Status: Operational
- Opening date: 1950
- Operator: Xcel Energy

Dam and spillways
- Type of dam: Gravity dam
- Impounds: Chippewa River
- Height (thalweg): 60 feet (18 m)
- Width (crest): 6,100 feet (1,900 m)
- Dam volume: 47,000 acre⋅ft (58,000,000 m^{3})
- Spillways: 1
- Spillway type: Controlled
- Spillway length: 462 feet (141 m)
- S pillway volumetric flow rate: 290,000 ft^{3}/s (490,000 m^{3}/min)

Reservoir
- Total capacity: 47,000 acre⋅ft (58,000,000 m^{3})
- Surface area: 4,300 acres (1,700 ha)
- Maximum water depth: 61 feet (19 m)
- Normal elevation: 1,047 feet (319 m)

Power Station
- Type: Conventional
- Turbines: 3
- Installed capacity: 34 MW

The current Holcombe Dam is a hydro-electric facility built in 1950 by the Wisconsin-Minnesota Light and Power Company, and is now owned and operated by Xcel Energy. It produces an average of 34 megawatts, and is one of six Xcel hydro plants on the Chippewa.

The flowage was originally created by the 1878 Little Falls Dam impounding the Chippewa. The dam was built by Elijah Swift and Joseph Viles for the Chippewa River Improvement and Log Driving Company to provide reliable water for floating logs downstream. Parts of the dam were washed out by floods in 1880 and 1884. A terrible accident occurred in 1905, when eleven log drivers drowned trying to get to a log jam near the dam. Sixteen men in a boat had tried to break up the logjam. Five men managed to leap to safety but the rest were thrown against the logs and rocks by the current. The dam functioned until 1910, when logging operations ceased. It washed out in the 1920s.
