= Marshal (university) =

A Marshal in a Sri Lankan University is an official tasked with maintaining discipline within the university premises. The role played by Marshals is similar to that of campus police, however they are not law enforcement officials. They intervene in instances of misconduct and breakdown of law and order and report the incident to the police. Each university has a Chief Marshal heading its marshals with the assistance of a Deputy Chief Marshal. The appointment of Marshals are done by the University Act.

== History ==
The units of Marshals were formed in the campuses of the University of Ceylon and thereafter continued in the University of Sri Lanka. They were units responsible for maintaining student discipline on instructions of the vice-chancellor and the senior faculty and providing security for university students and property. They did not carry firearms and law enforcement within the university was provided by the police.

After the University of Ceylon was dissolved, its former campuses became independent universities and maintained the Marshals units. These were dropped in the 1980s and replaced by private security guards who did not have the authority to maintain student discipline. Subsequently, clashes between student groups and ragging resulting in student deaths were blamed on the lack of disciplinary or actual control applied by the security guards. In recent years units of Marshals were re-instituted in several universities.

== Universities with Marshals ==
- University of Ceylon (dissolved in 1972 to establish the University of Sri Lanka.)
- University of Sri Lanka (dissolved in 1978)
- University of Colombo (Western Province)
- University of Peradeniya (Central Province)
- University of Sri Jayewardenepura (Western Province)
- University of Kelaniya (Western Province)
- University of Moratuwa (Western Province)
- University of Jaffna (Northern Province)
- University of Ruhuna (Southern Province)
- Eastern University, Sri Lanka (Eastern Province)
- Rajarata University of Sri Lanka (North Central Province)

== Ranks ==
- Chief Marshal
- Deputy Chief Marshal
- Marshal (Grade I)
- Marshal (Grade II)

== Uniform ==
Marshal's wear a dark blue uniform with a peak cap in the style of police uniforms. Ex-police and military personnel wear medal ribbons.

== See also ==
- Oxford University Police
- Cambridge University Constabulary
