= Judge Marshall =

Judge Marshall may refer to:

- Alina I. Marshall (born 1977), judge of the United States Tax Court
- Consuelo Bland Marshall (born 1936), judge of the United States District Court for the Central District of California
- D. Price Marshall Jr. (born 1963), judge of the United States District Court for the Eastern District of Arkansas
- James Markham Marshall (1764–1848), judge of the United States Circuit Court of the District of Columbia
- John Augustine Marshall (1854–1941), judge of the United States District Court for the District of Utah
- Prentice Marshall (1926–2004), judge of the United States District Court for the Northern District of Illinois
- Thurgood Marshall (1908–1993), judge of the United States Court of Appeals for the Second Circuit before serving on the United States Supreme Court

== See also ==
- Justice Marshall (disambiguation)
