= Marshall Township =

Marshall Township may refer to:

== Arkansas ==
- Marshall Township, White County, Arkansas, in White County, Arkansas

== Illinois ==
- Marshall Township, Clark County, Illinois

== Indiana ==
- Marshall Township, Lawrence County, Indiana

== Iowa ==
- Marshall Township, Louisa County, Iowa
- Marshall Township, Marshall County, Iowa
- Marshall Township, Pocahontas County, Iowa
- Marshall Township, Taylor County, Iowa

== Michigan ==
- Marshall Township, Michigan

== Minnesota ==
- Marshall Township, Mower County, Minnesota

== Missouri ==
- Marshall Township, Platte County, Missouri
- Marshall Township, Saline County, Missouri

== Nebraska ==
- Marshall Township, Clay County, Nebraska

== North Dakota ==
- Marshall Township, Williams County, North Dakota, in Williams County, North Dakota

== Ohio ==
- Marshall Township, Highland County, Ohio

== Pennsylvania ==
- Marshall Township, Pennsylvania
