= Marshall College =

Marshall College was the name of Marshall University in Huntington, West Virginia, before it was granted university status in 1961.

Marshall College can also refer to:

- Franklin & Marshall College in Lancaster, Pennsylvania
- Thurgood Marshall College at the University of California, San Diego
- Cleveland-Marshall College of Law as Cleveland State University
- College of the Marshall Islands in Uliga, Republic of the Marshall Islands
- Pronunciation of Marischal College, Aberdeen
- Marshall University Graduate College in South Charleston, West Virginia
- A fictional college where Indiana Jones teaches
