= Jump River =

River in Wisconsin, United States

Coordinates: 45°15′49″N 91°09′05″W

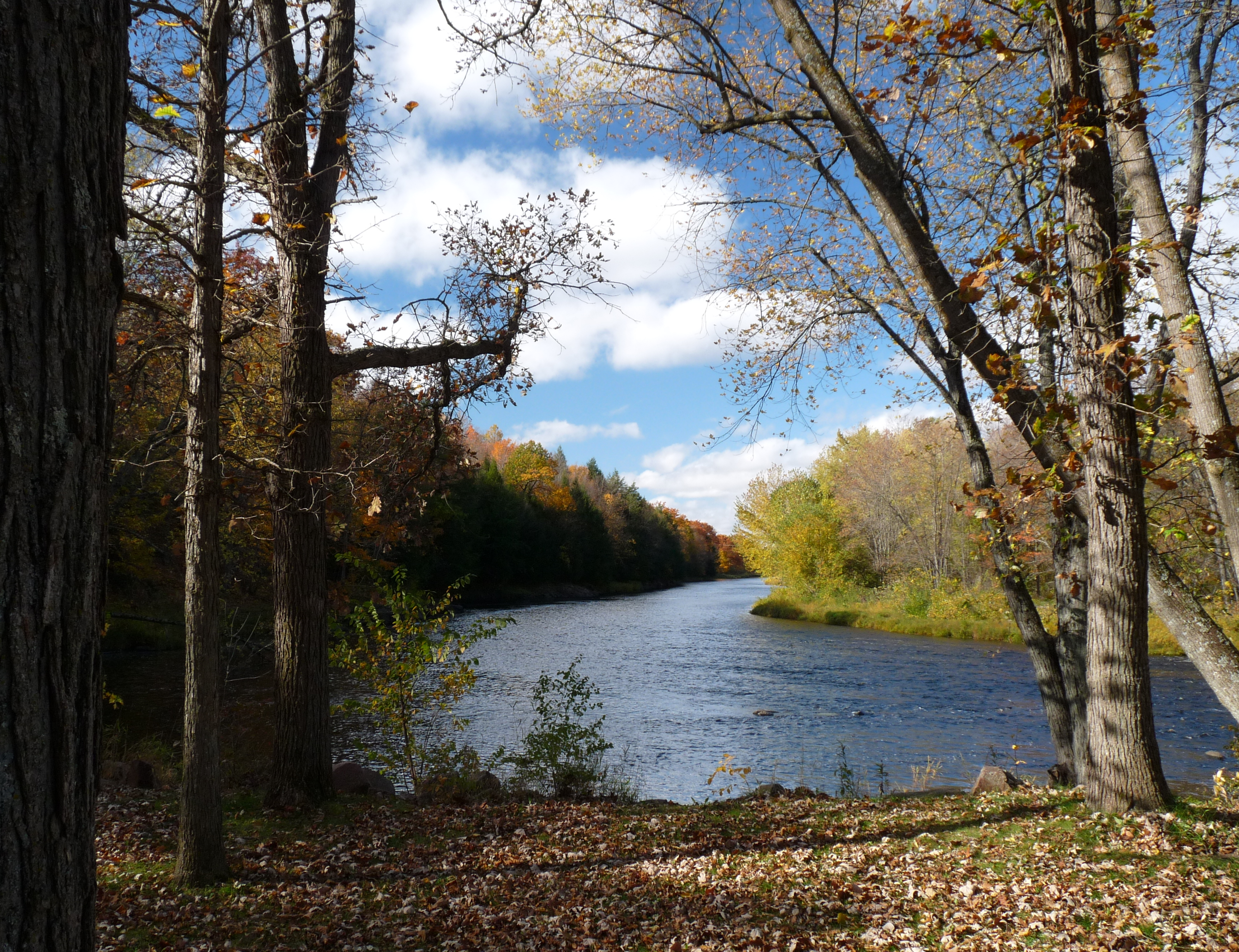
Looking downstream from the wayside at Jump River, with the water medium-high

The Jump River is a small rocky river in north-central Wisconsin. In the late 19th century it was used to drive logs down to the Chippewa River. Today it is used for recreation, rambling through woods and farmlands, used mostly by fishermen and paddlers.

== Geography ==
The Jump is formed at the confluence of the North Fork Jump River and the South Fork Jump River in southwestern Price County, Wisconsin. From there it flows approximately 25 miles (40 km) through Rusk, Taylor and Chippewa counties, emptying into the Holcombe Flowage and joining the Chippewa River, and eventually the Mississippi.

Communities along the river are Sheldon, Jump River, and Prentice.

== History ==
The origin of the river's name is the source of minor local controversy. Some say that the name comes from the jumping water in the many rapids which mark nearly the upper half of its course. Others maintain that the river was so-named because a 19th-century forest fire jumped the river. Still others suggest that log drivers named it for the way the water level "jumps" up and down rapidly after rains and thaws. Its name in Ojibwe does not shed light on its present name either, since the Ojibwa call this stream Manidoons-ziibi ("Little Spirit River").

Indians lived along the Jump in the early years, growing little plots of crops on the river bottoms.

Jump River Falls (Big Falls) was once thought the likely rapids where Father René Menard disappeared in 1661 while trying to reach a band of refugee Hurons near Lake Chelsea. Current thought is that he more likely disappeared at the dells of the Big Rib River, in the southeast corner of Taylor county.

Logging on the Jump had begun by 1858. Before that the Jump River valley was covered by heavy forest. The first surveyors in the mid-19th century found hemlock, yellow birch, sugar maple, white pine, black spruce, tamarack, white cedar, and other species, with hemlock most common. Crews cut the white pine first and stored the logs through the winter, then drove them down the river to mills at Chippewa and Eau Claire. Logs were driven from April to July. For the winter of 1888 to 1889, the Chippewa Logging Company and Mississippi River Logging Company estimated the cuts on various branches to be:

Main Chippewa	75,000,000 board feet
...	...
Main Jump	7,000,000 board feet
South Fork Jump	13,000,000 board feet
North Fork Jump	5,000,000 board feet

The last logs were driven down the Jump around 1903. The less buoyant species have been logged ever since, hauled out by rail and truck.

The first bridge across the Jump was the Wisconsin Central Railway's trestle at Prentice, built in the 1870s. The "Black Bridge" above the village of Jump River's swimming hole was built in 1899 and 1900. The SM&P Railway bridge at Jump River was built in 1904. The Range Line wagon bridge in Jump River was built in 1909. It was wrecked by an ice jam in 1913 and repaired. The Albert bridge on what is now county H was built in 1912. The La Follette Bridge just east of Jump River opened in 1933. The worst flood on record occurred around Labor Day of 1941. Days of rain raised the river level about twelve feet, destroying the Black Bridge and La Follette Bridge and washing out the north approach to the Range Line Bridge.

== Recreation ==
The Jump is good for canoeing when the water is high enough, with little rapids and boulders to dodge. The banks are largely undeveloped, though roads and farms are often just behind the trees. When the water level is medium to high, the stretch from the village of Jump River to County H or to Sheldon is fun. When the level is higher one can canoe from below Big Falls down to the village, and even above the Falls. Recent water levels at the gauging station at Sheldon are available here.

Fisherman angle in many holes along the river. Fish in the river include northern pike, smallmouth bass, musky, walleye, catfish, redhorse, and suckers. The areas below the North and South Forks are one of twelve areas in Wisconsin where lake sturgeon may be legally harvested.

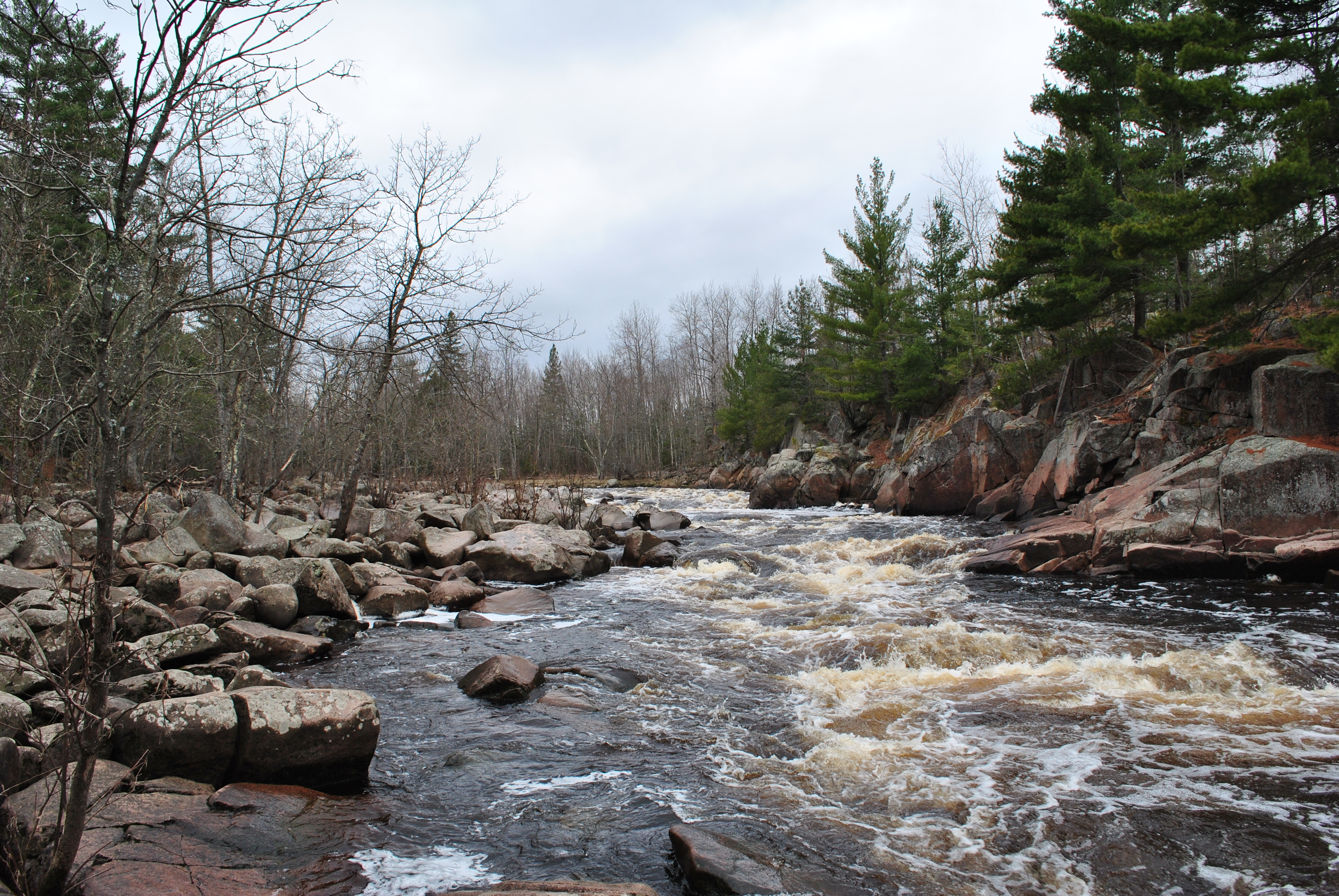
South Fork of the Jump River at Big Falls County Park

Big Falls County Park, known locally as "Jump River Falls," surrounds a small gorge where the river tumbles through boulders. It has a picnic area and walking trails along the river. Picnic areas are also at parks in the village of Jump River and Haley Park in Sheldon. Haley Park has a sandy swimming beach, as does "the swimming hole," a mile above the village of Jump River.

In winter when the river is frozen snowmobiles run on its ice.

== See also ==
- See Logging on the Chippewa for an overview of 19th century logging in the Chippewa watershed.
