= Chippewa River (Wisconsin) =

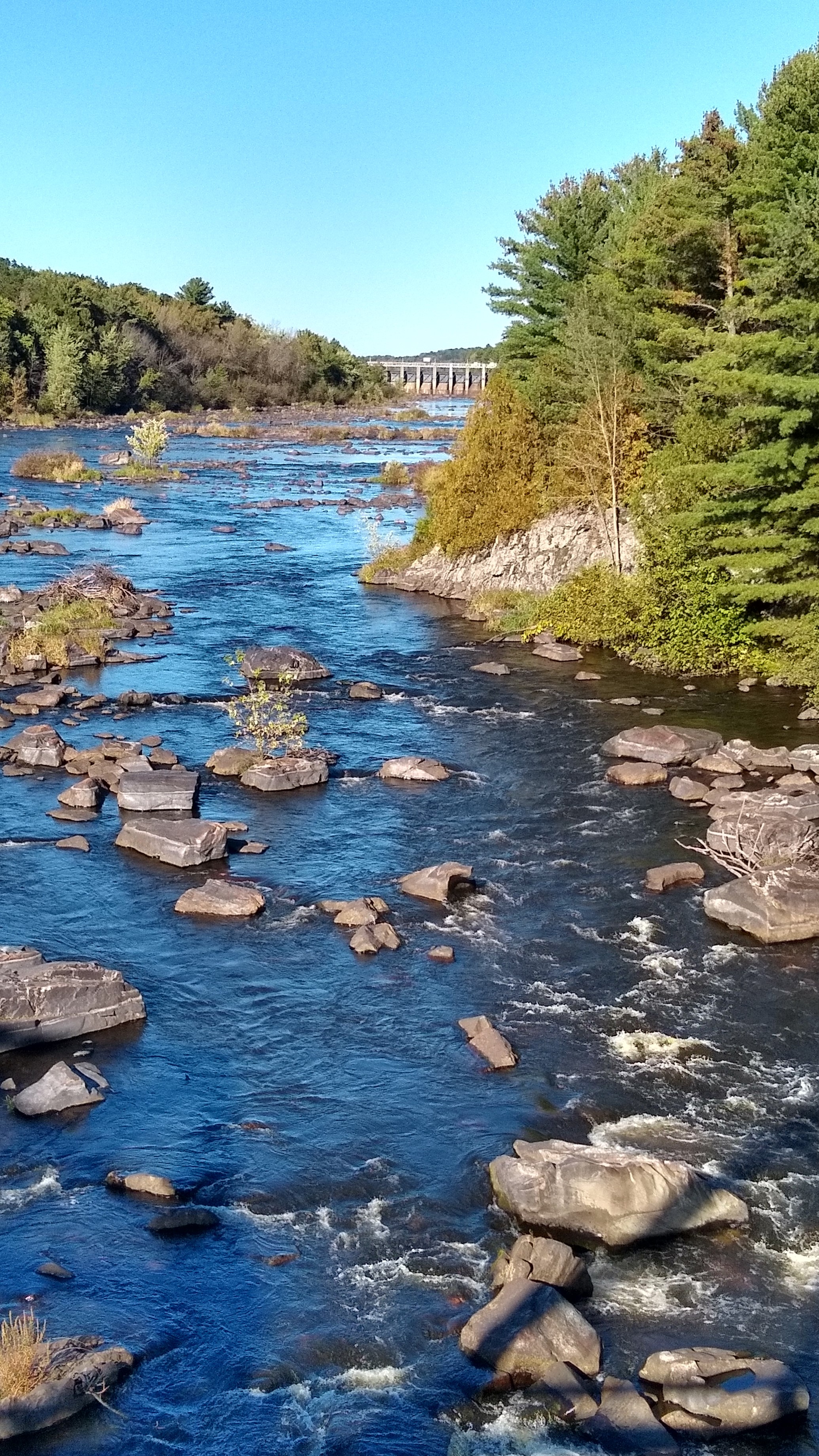
- Original channel of the Chippewa at Jim Falls, from the old highway bridge looking upstream toward the dam

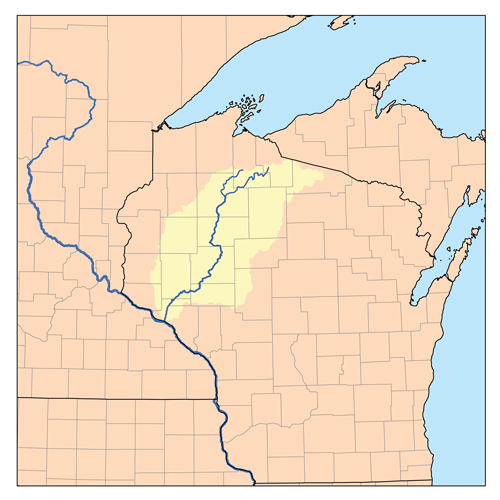
- Chippewa River and its watershed

Location
- Country: United States
- State: Wisconsin

Physical characteristics
- Source: West Fork Chippewa River and East Fork Chippewa River
  - location: Bayfield County
  - coordinates: 45.890286°N 91.078028°W
- Mouth
  - location: Buffalo County, Wisconsin
  - coordinates: 44.4091°N 92.0841°W
- Length: 183 mi (295 km)

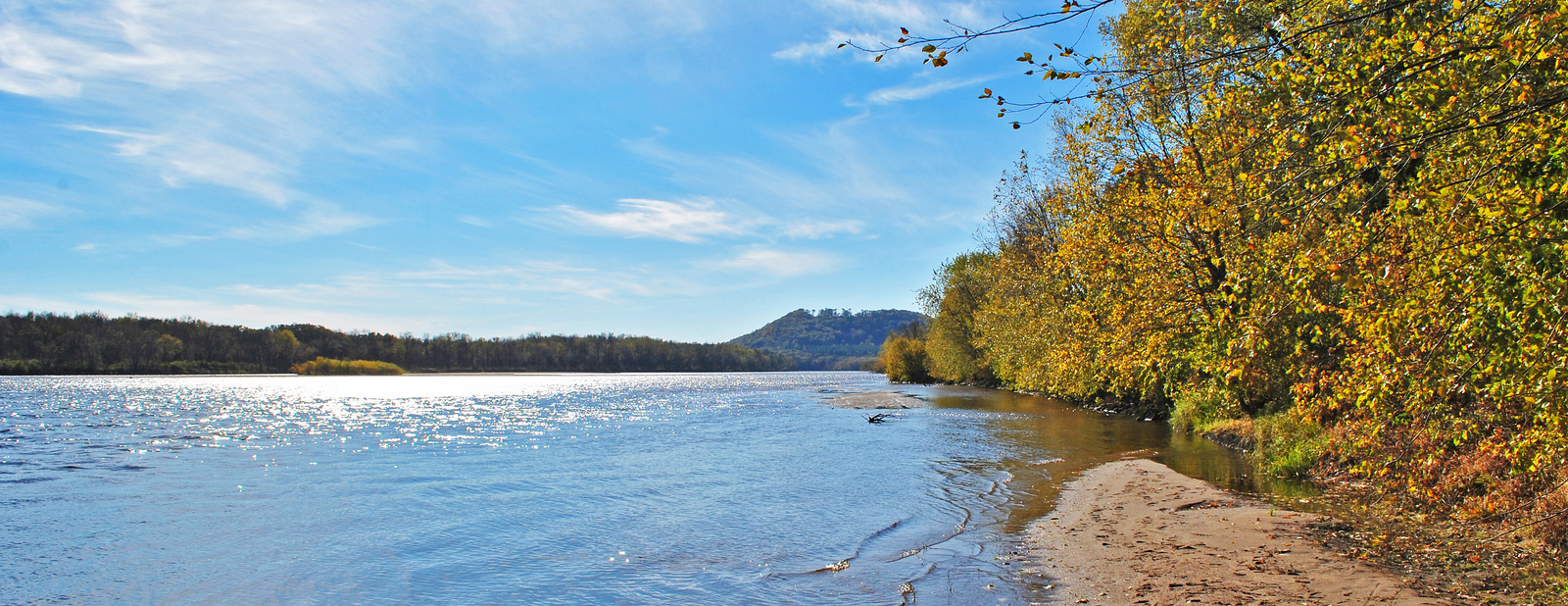
The Chippewa River as it passes through Pepin County, near Ella, WI.

The Chippewa River of northwest Wisconsin flows over 200 miles, starting about forty miles from Lake Superior and running southwest to the Mississippi River below Pepin. A half dozen dams along its course produce electricity. The man-made lakes above those dams support boating and cottages. Fishermen, canoeists, kayakers and sightseers enjoy all parts the river.

Long ago, Native Americans traveled and fished the Chippewa. In the late 1800s, when there were no roads or railroads in northern Wisconsin, lumbermen used the river and its tributaries to transport huge amounts of pine timber from the forests of northern Wisconsin to sawmills downstream and to lumber markets far down the Mississippi.

== Geography ==
The upper reaches of the Chippewa consist of two forks: the West Fork and the East. The West Fork rises at Chippewa Lake in southeastern Bayfield County, forty miles southwest of Ashland. The East Fork rises in the swamps of the southern part of the Town of Knight in Iron County, Wisconsin, thirty miles from Ironwood. The two forks meet at Lake Chippewa, a reservoir in central Sawyer County. From there, the river flows generally southwest through Rusk County. The section of the river from Holcombe to Chippewa Falls was called "the wild Chippewa" by log drivers, because it dropped rapidly through falls and rapids at Holcombe, Cornell, Jim Falls, Chippewa Falls, and other places as it flowed through what would become modern Chippewa County. Most of these falls are now submerged by reservoirs. Then it slows down through Eau Claire, Dunn, Pepin and Buffalo counties, before emptying into the Mississippi River. Sediment build-up at the river's mouth forms a delta that protrudes into the Mississippi, creating Lake Pepin.

Major lakes along the river's route include the Radisson and Holcombe Flowages, Lake Wissota and Dell's Pond, all of which are reservoirs. The largest reservoir by far is the Chippewa Flowage, which is the 3rd largest lake in Wisconsin.

The river's primary tributaries include the Couderay, Thornapple, Flambeau, Brunet, Jump, Fisher, Yellow, Eau Claire, Red Cedar and Eau Galle Rivers. The river's confluence with the Red Cedar is just north of the Driftless Zone, at which point its floodplain widens out considerably, and includes numerous riverine islands.

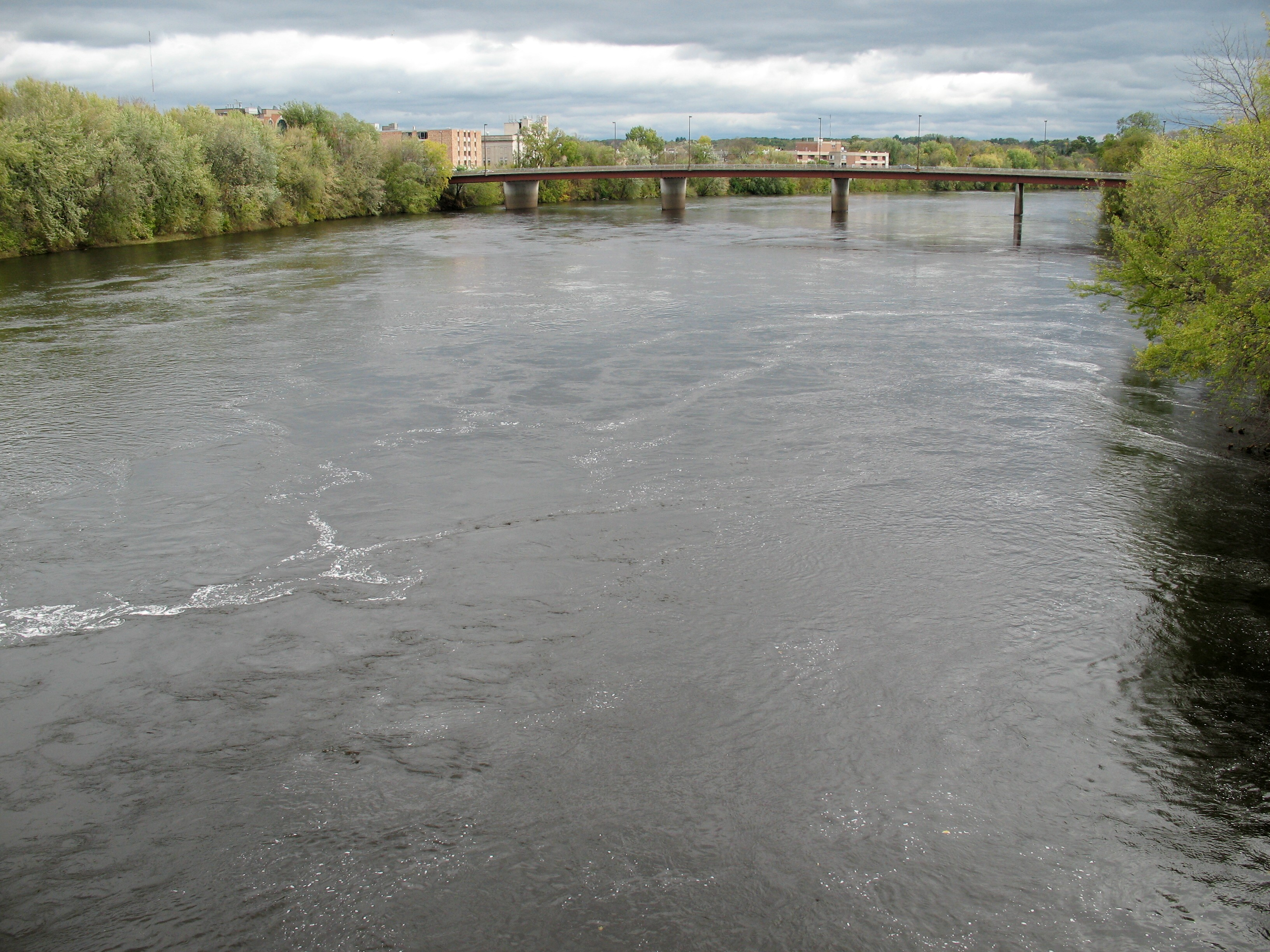
The Chippewa River from the west bank of the river looking south toward the Lake Street bridge in downtown Eau Claire (taken in 2007)

The primary settlements along the river's course include Cornell, Chippewa Falls, Eau Claire, and Durand.

Different segments of the river were formed in different eras. The newest part of the river is in the north, where it flows through the till plain left by the Wisconsin glaciation - the most recent continental glacier - which receded about 10,000 years ago. The part of that glacier that bulged down the Chippewa valley is given the name of the river - the Chippewa lobe. Before receding, it reached a little past Cornell, below where the river crosses today's Ice Age Trail. Below Cornell the Chippewa flows through the till plains of older glaciers until it enters the Driftless Area near the Mississippi. As the glacier receded, its meltwater cut the river's channel through the northern till plain, dumping sediment into the older river channel downstream. This sediment formed outwash plains in the old river valley. As the glacier retreated and sediment reduced, the flow of water cut new channels through the outwash plains, often exposing Precambrian igneous bedrock in the upper Chippewa and Cambrian sandstone in the lower.

== History ==
=== Indians, explorers, names, and land cessions ===
Various Native American peoples lived along the Chippewa over the years. Paleo-Indians arrived soon after the glacier retreated. By the 1600s Dakota people dominated the Chippewa valley. In 1680 Father Hennepin ventured about 30 miles up the Chippewa from the Mississippi. He called the river "la Riviere des Taureaux Sauvages" - the River of the Wild Beefs. In 1686 French explorer Nicolas Perrot built Fort St. Antoine near the mouth of the Chippewa River and traded with the Dakota for furs.

In the 1700s, during a hundred-year war between the Dakota and Ojibwe, the Ojibwe people took control of much of northern Wisconsin, including the upper Chippewa valley. The river's name on the 1742 Carte de la Louisiane et du Cours du Mississipi is "Rivière de bon Secours ou Hahatonouadeba". "bon Secours" means something like "good help" and "Hahatonouadeba" is from the Dakota language Ḣaḣatuŋ[waŋ W]atpa, meaning Ojibwe River. In 1767, English explorer Jonathan Carver ascended the Chippewa on his way from the Mississippi to Lac Courte Oreilles and Lake Superior. He provides an early description of the lower Chippewa:

The country adjoining to the river for about sixty miles, is very level, and on its banks lie fine meadows, where larger droves of buffaloes and elks were feeding, than I had observed in any other part of my travels. The track between the two branches of this river is termed the Road of War between the Chipeway and Naudowessie Indians.

He goes on to describe the upper river:

The country to the Falls...is almost without any timber, and above that very uneven and rugged, and closely wooded with pines, beach, maple, and birch.... Near the heads of this river is a town of the Chipeways, from whence it takes its name. It is situated on each side of the river (which at this place is of no considerable breadth) and lies adjacent to the banks of a small lake. This town contains about forty houses, and can send out upwards of one hundred warriors, many of whom were fine stout young men. The houses of it are built after the Indian manner, and have neat plantations behind them..."

By the late 1700s, fur traders had established posts at the headwaters of the Chippewa. The modern name "Chippewa" is a rendering of the name "Ojibwe."

In 1837 the U.S. forced the Dakota to cede the lower Chippewa valley, from what is now Eau Claire down to the Mississippi. That same year in the White Pine Treaty, the U.S. forced the Ojibwe to cede much of northern Wisconsin, including the Chippewa valley above Eau Claire. These land cessions cleared the way for logging.

=== Logging in the wilderness ===
Of the forests in Wisconsin in the 1800s, the Chippewa River system held more pine timber than even the Wisconsin River. It is estimated that the Chippewa system drained 34% of Wisconsin's pineries, as compared to 21% for the Wisconsin, 14% for the St. Croix, and 7% for the Black. Before logging, the Chippewa Valley probably held about 46,000,000,000 board feet of lumber. Frederick Weyerhaeuser described it as "a logger's paradise, a very large part of its area being heavily forested with the finest quality of white pine timber, while rivers, streams, and lakes offered an excellent network of transportation facilities." If the whole Chippewa watershed is thought of as a factory, the rivers were the conveyor belts - but unruly, fickle ones at times.

The first sawmill in the Chippewa watershed was probably functioning at what would become Menomonie around 1831. By 1840, Jean Brunet and associates were sawing wood at Chippewa Falls. Eau Claire's first sawmill was built in 1846. Floods destroyed all these early mills, but the lumbermen rebuilt. A great supply of timber lay upstream and a great demand for lumber lay downstream - frame houses and barns were needed at growing cities like St. Louis and at farms on the treeless prairies of Nebraska and beyond. That combination attracted industrious men with the promise of huge profits. In 1848, when Wisconsin became a state, the infant Chippewa County's boundaries followed the Chippewa River's watershed almost to upper Michigan - evidence of the river's commercial importance at that time.

==== Journey of a log ====
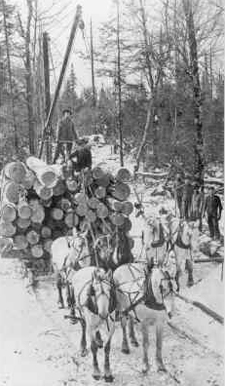
Loading logs onto a sleigh in western Taylor County, in the Chippewa watershed, 1909

Logging camps upstream cut logs to send to each mill. Generally the logging camp was constructed in the fall, near timber that the logging company had rights to, near a water source, and within a few miles of a river or decent-sized stream. The shanties (buildings) were rough, low structures built from whatever trees were handy. In the cold days of winter, lumberjacks would crawl out of their bunks before dawn, walk out into the woods, and fell trees with axes. A pair of sawyers would remove the limbs and saw the trees into logs - typically sixteen feet long. A "scaler" measured each log and stamped the mark of his lumber company on the end. A "skidder" and his oxen (or horses) pulled each log out to a skidway in the woods. There a teamster loaded the logs onto a sleigh and his horses pulled them to a river or stream bank - usually less than six miles away. Then they were piled up into "rollways" or pushed onto the ice, waiting for spring.

In the early years, supplies were hauled up the river as far as Chippewa Falls on keelboats. Steamboats began to travel up to Eau Claire starting around the early 1850s. Above Chippewa Falls, the tote road was the main way to move supplies and men to the camps upriver. The Chippewa Trail was a tote road that ran from Chippewa Falls north for about thirty-five miles to Big Bend in modern Rusk County, then followed the west bank of the Chippewa River roughly along what is now highway 40 past the sites of modern Bruce and Radisson to a place called Trading Post, which now lies beneath the Chippewa Flowage. This tote road was especially busy in spring and fall; during one trip down the trail in November of 1873 a traveler counted sixty horse teams and about 200 men walking. By 1878 a livery stable in Chippewa Falls operated a horse-pulled stage on the trail. Every five or ten miles along the way was a stopping place, which ranged from a backwoods hotel to a barn where men and horses could rest for the night under a roof. At the Hall-Raynor stopping place near modern Ojibwa a visitor recalled, "you had to step high at night after the stoppers retired, as 100 men often slept on the floor."

April 1869 log jam at Paint Creek Rapids above Chippewa Falls, from an engraving in Harper's Weekly. When a boom broke upstream, 150 million board feet of logs piled up into a jam as high as 30 feet and reaching 15 miles up the river.

The 16-foot logs were floated down the rivers in the spring and early summer, when the ice and snow thawed and the rivers were high. Above Chippewa Falls, where the river was rough and rocky, masses of individual logs were floated down on the flood, shepherded by log drivers. The most agile drivers went ahead and tried to unblock log jams as fast as they formed, racing out to the jams in bateaux or walking on the floating logs. Other drivers brought up the rear, wading in the shallows and pushing along logs that stalled on sandbars and in brush. Driving crews were usually supported by a wannigan - a floating cookhouse that fed them hot food after long hours working in cold water. This was all dangerous work. In one terrible day in 1905, eleven log drivers drowned while trying to untangle a log jam near modern Holcombe.

To make the drives more efficient and reliable, the loggers changed the river somewhat, dynamiting troublesome rocks, cutting trees that would snag logs, building up the banks in places, and damming the river and its tributaries. In 1878 a large splash dam was built at Little Falls (modern Holcombe), with so much capacity that when fully opened, it was said to raise the Chippewa three feet 100 miles downstream. Over the Chippewa and its tributaries, the loggers built at least 148 logging dams of various sizes and purposes. At the end of the drive, logs were captured in log booms and holding ponds above Chippewa Falls and Eau Claire, where they could be sorted and passed on to the owning sawmill.

The big mills at Chippewa Falls and Eau Claire started sawing in the 1840s. Typically the logs were pulled from a hot pond up a bull slide into the sawmill. The logs were washed to remove sand and mud that would dull the saws. The early mills sawed logs with single up-and-down sash saws driven by water wheels. As technology advanced, these were replaced by muley saws, circular saws in the 1850s, later gang saws, and more efficient bandsaws around the 1880s as the lumbermen realized that the forests wouldn't last forever. Some smaller mills sawed lumber for local use, but the big mills floated most of their product to markets downriver. Some lumber for local use was seasoned and planed, but the lumber for downriver was left rough, because finished lumber would have been damaged on its next float.

Mississippi lumber raft in the 1800s

By the 1850s, the sawmills were binding the sawed pine lumber into rafts to float down the lower Chippewa to markets on the Mississippi. The rough-sawed lumber from the sawmill was first assembled into a "crib" in a rafting shed beside the river. A crib was a packet of boards 16 feet by 16 or 32 feet and stacked almost a yard deep, pinned together in a frame with tough elm or ironwood roots. When slid from the shed into the river, the top of this crib floated a few inches above the water. Seven of these cribs were linked end to end into a "string," and a 34-foot steering oar was mounted on the back of the string and one on the front. Then four strings were connected side by side to make what was called a "Chippewa raft." A crew of about ten men would take this raft down the Chippewa to the Mississippi. In early years only the current propelled them but after 1879 some rafts were pushed by steamboats. At the Mississippi several Chippewa rafts were joined together into a larger "Mississippi raft." The largest of these carried millions of board feet of lumber and covered acres. Their destinations were lumber yards in places like Dubuque, Rock Island, and St. Louis. Over on the Wisconsin River, rafting stopped when the railroad arrived because of shifting sandbars in the lower river, but rafting continued on the Chippewa even after the railroad reached Eau Claire because it remained cheaper to float huge amounts of wood down the Chippewa and Mississippi than to haul them on railcars.

==== Corporate lumbering ====
The lumber companies' fortunes went up and down for reasons ranging from dry springs when logs were stranded along the riverbanks to raging floods when roaring water and masses of logs ripped out dams and sawmills - from low demand for lumber during nationwide economic downturns like the Panic of 1857 to the economic boom after the Civil War. For example, the mill in Chippewa Falls ran for six years, then was washed out by a flood in 1847, rebuilt and reorganized in 1848 as the Chippewa Falls Lumber Company, half-washed-out again in 1855, failed several times in the 1860s, was reincorporated as the Union Lumber Company in 1869, went bankrupt several times in the 1870s, and was reorganized in 1879 as Chippewa Lumber & Boom Company.

There were smaller companies around Chippewa Falls, but the huge Chippewa Lumber & Boom mill dominated. Similarly, Knapp, Stout & Co. dominated in Menomonie on the Red Cedar River. Eau Claire, in contrast, had many large sawmills and many lumber companies. Eau Claire's first mills built in the 1840s are not well-documented, but they were followed by the Eau Claire Lumber Company, Empire Lumber Company, the Dells Lumber Company, the Pioneers Lumber Company, the Mayhew Lumber Company, the Valley Lumber Company, the Sherman Lumber Company, the Daniel Shaw Lumber Company, Westville Lumber Company, the Northwestern Lumber Company a few miles down the river from Eau Claire at Porter's Mills, and later the John H. Kaiser Lumber Company.

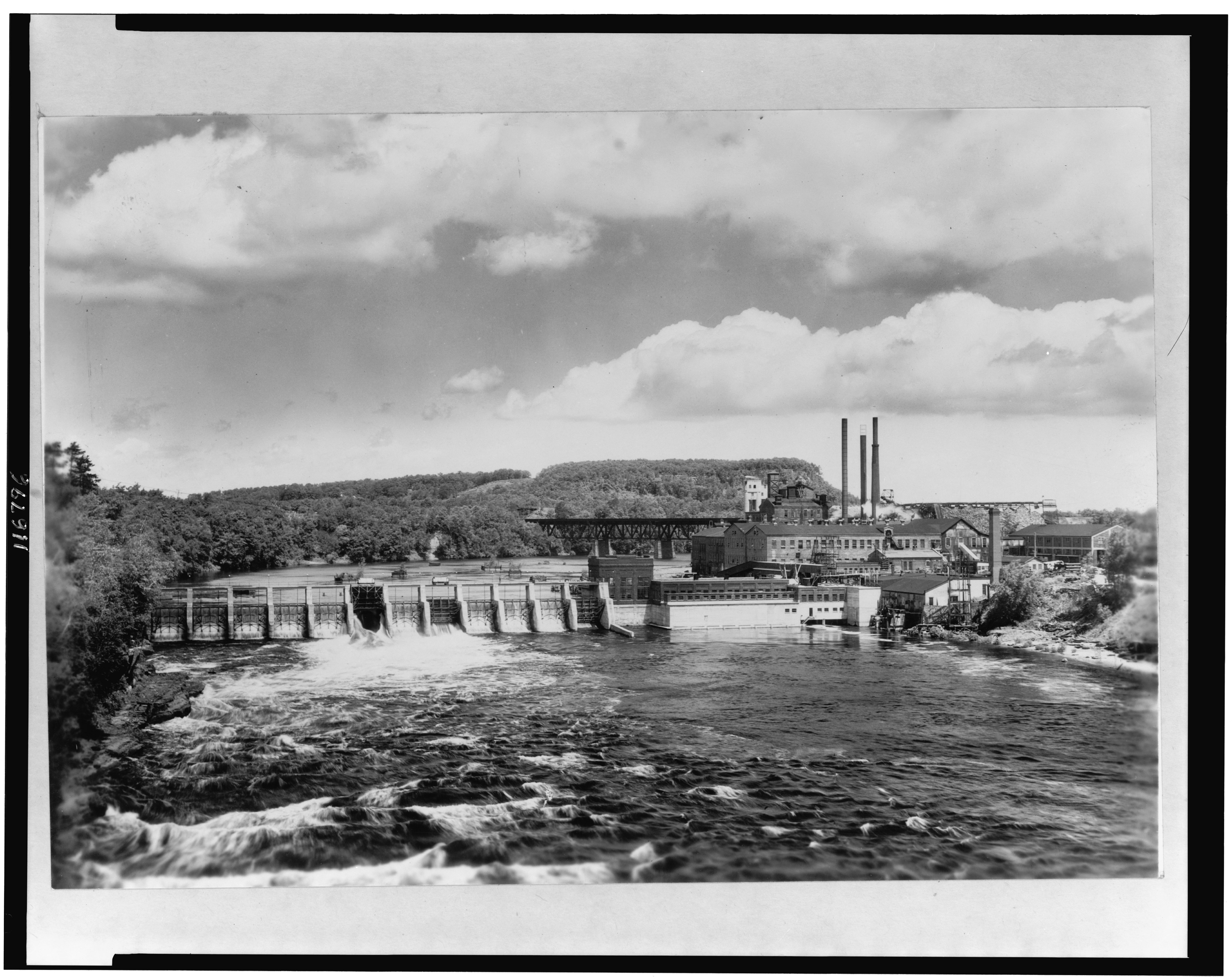
Dells Pulp and Paper Company Dam at Eau Claire, 1890

These lumber companies were in competition, and there was tension at times. In the early years, the Eau Claire companies stored most of their logs in reservoirs above Chippewa Falls. They wanted their own holding area closer to Eau Claire, so the Chippewa Falls mills couldn't interfere with getting their logs to the mill. In 1860 they asked the state for permission to build a dam and holding pond at the Dells just above Eau Claire, but the request was vetoed by the governor. The big company at the Falls feared that the proposed dam would impede passage of their lumber rafts heading for market. It wasn't until 1878 that the Dells dam was finally built. It created the log-storage pond that the Eau Claire mills had wanted. Contrary to the fears of the Chippewa Falls mills, the new Dells Dam made transit easier for them, replacing several rapids with a lock to allow passage of steamboats and lumber rafts.

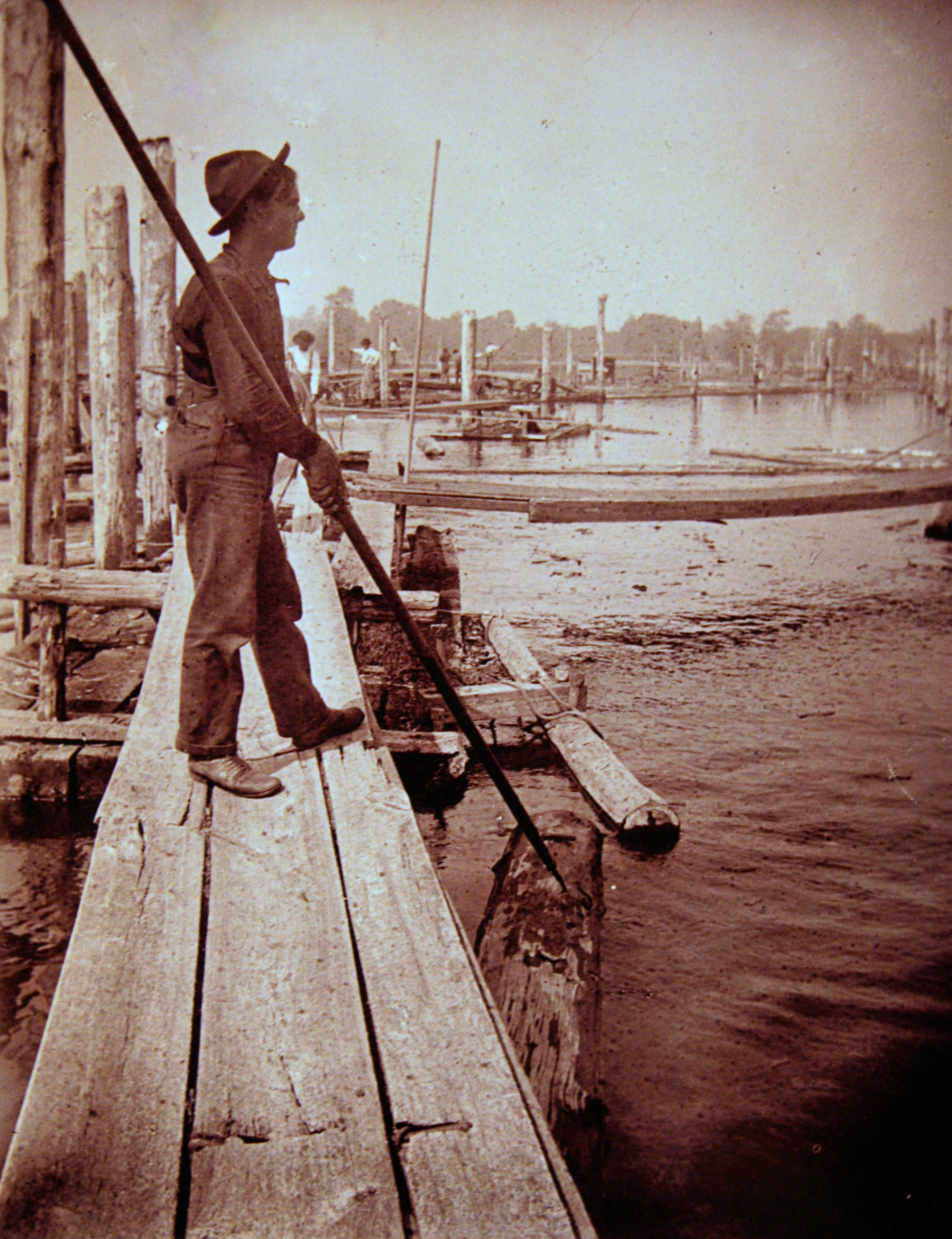
Scene from Beef Slough's log-sorting works

The other big player on the Chippewa River was the Beef Slough Manufacturing, Boom, Log Driving and Transportation Company. The company was named for the Beef Slough - a languid side-channel of the Chippewa River just above its confluence with the Mississippi. The Beef Slough Company was a collaboration of Mississippi River sawmills organized in 1867 to create a holding pond to store and sort logs in the slough. The company drove logs from the Chippewa and its tributaries all the way down to the slough and there linked the logs into big brails (rafts of logs - not sawed lumber) to guide to their mills down the Mississippi in places like Rock Island and St. Louis. The Chippewa sawmills saw Beef Slough as a threat - a project to take raw logs out of the Chippewa Valley, denying them the profit from processing the logs. They fought Beef Slough in the state legislature and impeded its logs at their dams. At about the same time as the tensions between the Eau Claire and Chippewa mills, the Mississippi sawmills were also frustrated by delays in getting their logs through the holding ponds at Chippewa Falls and Eau Claire. In 1868, with many of the Mississippi mills' logs were delayed, a gang of 150 Beef Slough men went up the river armed and cut the boom of a holding pond above Eau Claire, releasing about 10 million logs into the river, of which only 10% belonged to Beef Slough mills. The next day a party of 200 Eau Claire men led by the sheriff drove the Beef Slough mob out of town before they could cut any more booms. This confrontation has been called the "Beef Slough War."

To mitigate conflicts like this between lumber companies, the Chippewa River Booming Company was formed in 1855 to manage river use for all companies. Booming companies were a tactic from New England that was implemented on all north-Wisconsin river systems around this time. Based on the tensions described above, conflicts remained.

The original Beef Slough Company went bankrupt in 1872, but the Mississippi sawmills still needed its services, so led by Frederick Weyerhaeuser, they formed a new syndicate to take over Beef Slough's business - the Mississippi River Logging Company. The Chippewa mills fought this new development for nine years - in the legislature, in the courts, and at the holding ponds - but a huge flood in 1880 damaged booms, dams and mills up and down the river and left everyone's logs jumbled together downstream - a huge mess. Rather than negotiate and litigate forever, in a meeting in Chicago in 1881 six Eau Claire companies agreed with twelve Mississippi River lumber companies to a simple solution: going forward the mill owners on the Chippewa got 35% of the logs coming down the river and the Mississippi mills got 65%. Around the same time, the big mill at Chippewa Falls went bankrupt again and Weyerhaeuser's group bought a majority share of it. This all facilitated cooperation and a new shared log-transport company was formed - the Chippewa River Improvement and Log Driving Company. After this, the logging companies on the Chippewa worked together fairly well.

Over the years, logging in the Chippewa valley saw technological advancements. In the woods, axes were replaced with crosscut saws. The oxen that did early skidding and sledding were gradually replaced with large horses. In some places the horse sleighs were replaced by steam haulers. In a few areas too far from a driveable stream for horses, temporary logging railroads were built. The big dam at Holcombe allowed logs to be sluiced below that point all summer into September, as needed. Still, the weather and river remained unpredictable and dangerous: a flood in September 1884 destroyed the dam at Holcombe, bridges in Eau Claire, houses and the sheer boom at Beef Slough. But these were mostly rebuilt. Logging production in the Chippewa valley peaked from 1888 to 1894. The sawmill at Chippewa Falls was said to be the largest mill under one roof in the world. But eventually the timber lands ran out. In 1905 the Mississippi River Logging Company drove its last logs down to Beef Slough. 1911 saw the last log drives from the dam at Holcombe, and the big sawmill in Chippewa Falls finally shut down the same year.

=== Hydro-electricity ===
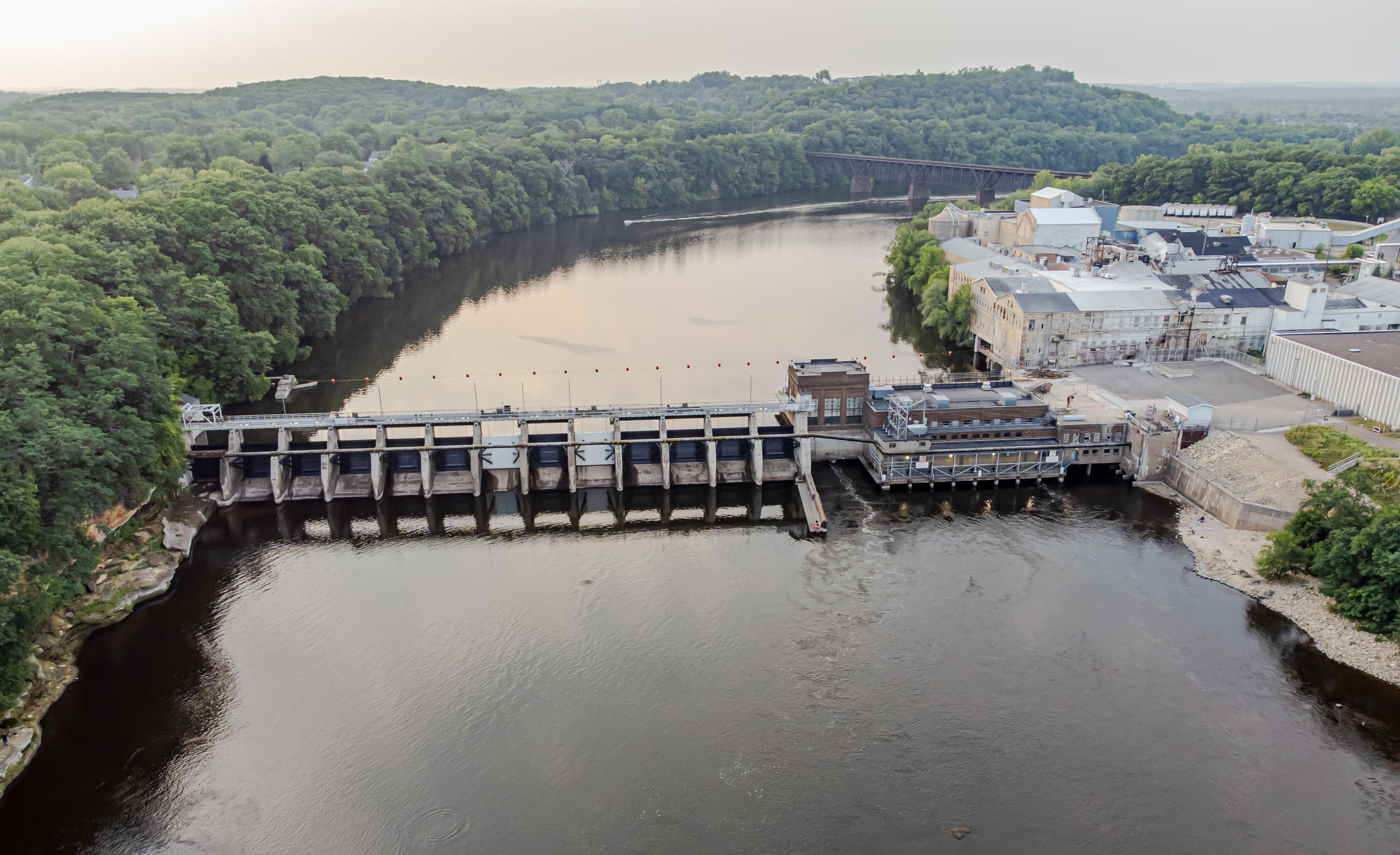
Hydroelectric dam on the Chippewa River in Eau Claire

Hydroelectric dams on the Chippewa River

Hydro-electric dams were built at Cornell and Jim Falls around 1911. With these, logs could no longer be driven down that section of the river, so had to be loaded onto rail cars at places like Holcombe for shipment. In 1948 Northern States Power built the hydro-electric dam that now impounds the Holcombe Flowage. Today a string of hydro dams harnesses the section of the river from Holcombe to Eau Claire.

== Recreation ==
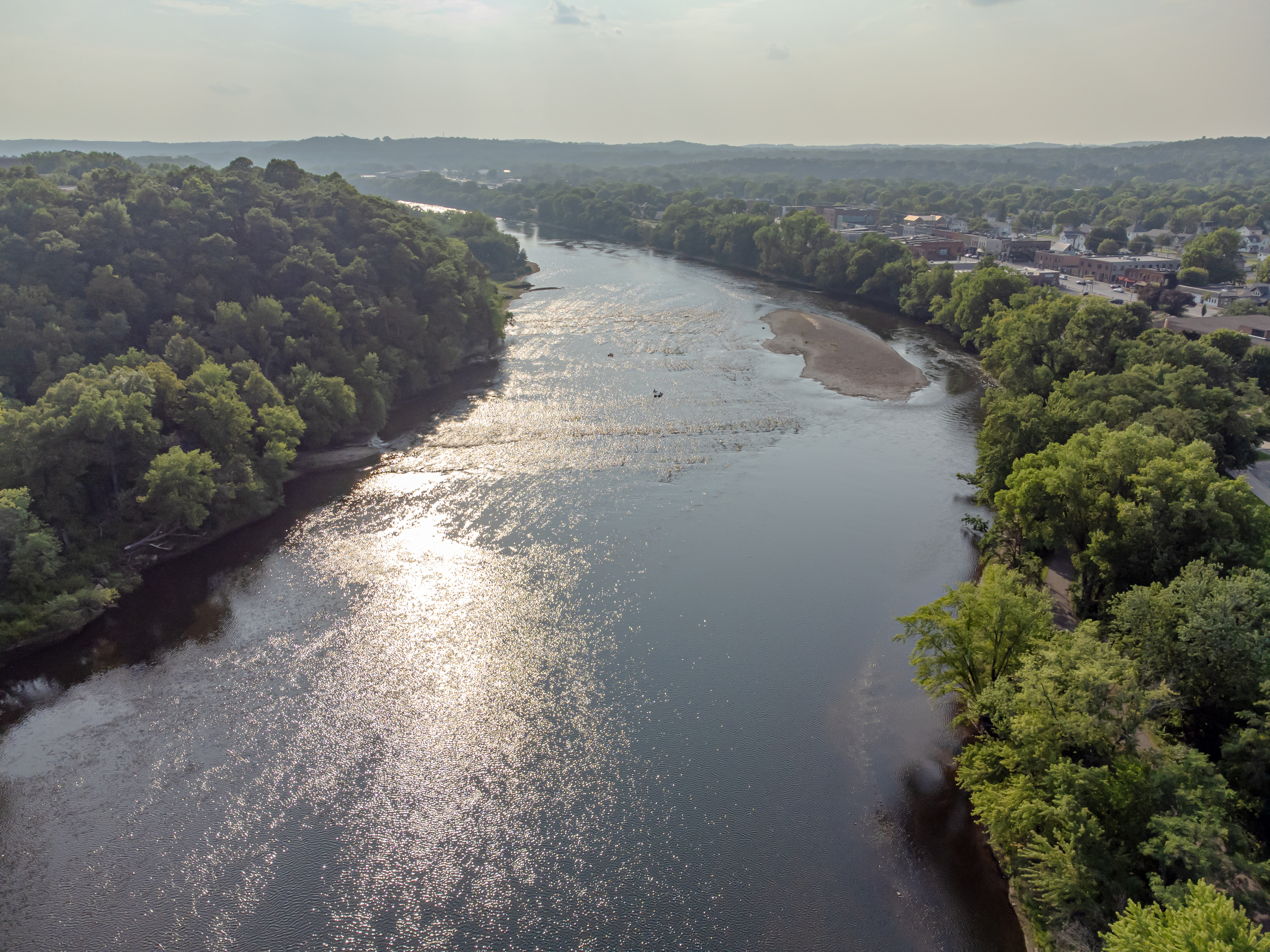
Tubers floating down the Chippewa River through light rapids on the campus of UW-Eau Claire

The Chippewa River is a popular destination for recreational kayakers and canoers. Paddlers experience a variety of conditions on the river, from calm, slow-moving water to small rapids and whitewater. Fishing is a popular activity: the river is known for musky, smallmouth bass, walleye, and northern pike.

Bikers also enjoy the river. The old Abe Trail follows an old railroad grade along the river from Brunet Island Park at Cornell down to Lake Wissota Park north of Chippewa Falls. The river is easily accessible for bikers and pleasure seekers via the Chippewa River State Trail, which follows the river from Eau Claire to Durand. Chippewa River Bottoms, along the river in Buffalo County, has been designated a National Natural Landmark.

== See also ==
- List of Wisconsin rivers
