= Justice Marshall =

Justice Marshall may refer to:

== United States Supreme Court ==
- John Marshall (1755–1835), chief justice of the United States Supreme Court
- Thurgood Marshall (1908–1993), associate justice of the United States Supreme Court
- John Marshall Harlan (1833–1911), associate justice of the United States Supreme Court
- John Marshall Harlan II (1899–1971), associate justice of the United States Supreme Court

== Other courts ==
- Carrington T. Marshall (1869–1958), chief justice of the Ohio Supreme Court
- John Marshall (Kansas judge) (1858–1931), justice of the Kansas Supreme Court from 1915 to 1931
- Margaret H. Marshall (born 1944), associate justice and 23rd chief justice of the Massachusetts Supreme Judicial Court
- Roujet D. Marshall (1847–1922), associate justice of the Wisconsin Supreme Court
- Thomas O. Marshall (1920–2003), associate justice and chief justice of the Supreme Court of Georgia

== See also ==
- Chief Justice Marshall
- Judge Marshall (disambiguation)
