= Holcombe, Wisconsin =

Census-designated place in Wisconsin, United States

- Census-designated place
- Location within Wisconsin
- Coordinates: 45°13′28″N 91°07′03″W
- Country: United States
- State: Wisconsin
- County: Chippewa
- Town: Lake Holcombe

Area
  - Total: 0.967 sq mi (2.50 km^{2})
  - Land: 0.967 sq mi (2.50 km^{2})
  - Water: 0 sq mi (0 km^{2})
- Elevation: 1,047 ft (319 m)

Population (2020)
  - Total: 239
  - Density: 247/sq mi (95.4/km^{2})
- Time zone: UTC-6 (Central (CST))
  - Summer (DST): UTC-5 (CDT)
- ZIP code: 54745
- Area codes: 715 & 534
- GNIS feature ID: 1566537

Holcombe is a census-designated place located in Chippewa County, Wisconsin, United States. As of the 2020 census, Holcombe had a population of 239.

== Description ==
Historical population
| Census | Pop. | Note | %± |
|---|---|---|---|
| 2010 | 267 | | — |
| 2020 | 239 | | −10.5% |

Holcombe is located on the Chippewa River north-northeast of Cornell, in the town of Lake Holcombe. Holcombe has a post office with ZIP code 54745. As of the 2010 census, its population was 267.

== History ==
Holcombe was founded in 1902. It was named for an acquaintance of a railroad official. A post office has been in operation in Holcombe since 1902.

== Climate ==
Climate data for Holcombe, Wisconsin (1991–2020 normals, extremes 1942–present)
| Month | Jan | Feb | Mar | Apr | May | Jun | Jul | Aug | Sep | Oct | Nov | Dec | Year |
|---|---|---|---|---|---|---|---|---|---|---|---|---|---|
| Record high °F (°C) | 53 (12) | 60 (16) | 81 (27) | 90 (32) | 94 (34) | 95 (35) | 99 (37) | 100 (38) | 95 (35) | 89 (32) | 75 (24) | 62 (17) | 100 (38) |
| Mean daily maximum °F (°C) | 22.3 (−5.4) | 27.6 (−2.4) | 39.1 (3.9) | 53.5 (11.9) | 66.2 (19.0) | 75.1 (23.9) | 79.6 (26.4) | 77.4 (25.2) | 69.6 (20.9) | 56.1 (13.4) | 39.9 (4.4) | 27.7 (−2.4) | 52.8 (11.6) |
| Daily mean °F (°C) | 12.3 (−10.9) | 16.5 (−8.6) | 28.7 (−1.8) | 42.9 (6.1) | 55.3 (12.9) | 64.7 (18.2) | 69.1 (20.6) | 66.9 (19.4) | 58.8 (14.9) | 45.9 (7.7) | 31.9 (−0.1) | 19.7 (−6.8) | 42.7 (5.9) |
| Mean daily minimum °F (°C) | 2.3 (−16.5) | 5.5 (−14.7) | 18.3 (−7.6) | 32.3 (0.2) | 44.5 (6.9) | 54.3 (12.4) | 58.7 (14.8) | 56.4 (13.6) | 47.9 (8.8) | 35.8 (2.1) | 23.8 (−4.6) | 11.6 (−11.3) | 32.6 (0.3) |
| Record low °F (°C) | −44 (−42) | −45 (−43) | −40 (−40) | 1 (−17) | 20 (−7) | 27 (−3) | 36 (2) | 32 (0) | 17 (−8) | 11 (−12) | −16 (−27) | −39 (−39) | −45 (−43) |
| Average precipitation inches (mm) | 1.03 (26) | 1.02 (26) | 1.72 (44) | 3.01 (76) | 3.86 (98) | 4.71 (120) | 3.87 (98) | 4.26 (108) | 3.67 (93) | 3.04 (77) | 1.85 (47) | 1.29 (33) | 33.33 (847) |
Source: NOAA
