= Wisconsin Highway 102 =

State highway in Wisconsin, United States

State Trunk Highway 102
- WIS 102 highlighted in red

Route information
- Maintained by WisDOT
- Length: 18.25 mi (29.37 km)

Major junctions
- South end: WIS 13 in Chelsea
- North end: WIS 86 in Spirit

Location
- Country: United States
- State: Wisconsin
- Counties: Taylor, Price

Highway system
- Wisconsin State Trunk Highway System; Interstate; US; State; Scenic; Rustic
| ← WIS 101 | → WIS 103 |

State Trunk Highway 102 (often called Highway 102, STH-102 or WIS 102) is a 18.25-mile (29.37 km) state highway in Taylor and Price counties in north central Wisconsin, United States, that runs from Wisconsin Highway 13 (WIS 13) north of Chelsea northeast to Wisconsin Highway 86 (WIS 86) in Spirit. The highway is maintained by the Wisconsin Department of Transportation.

== Route description ==
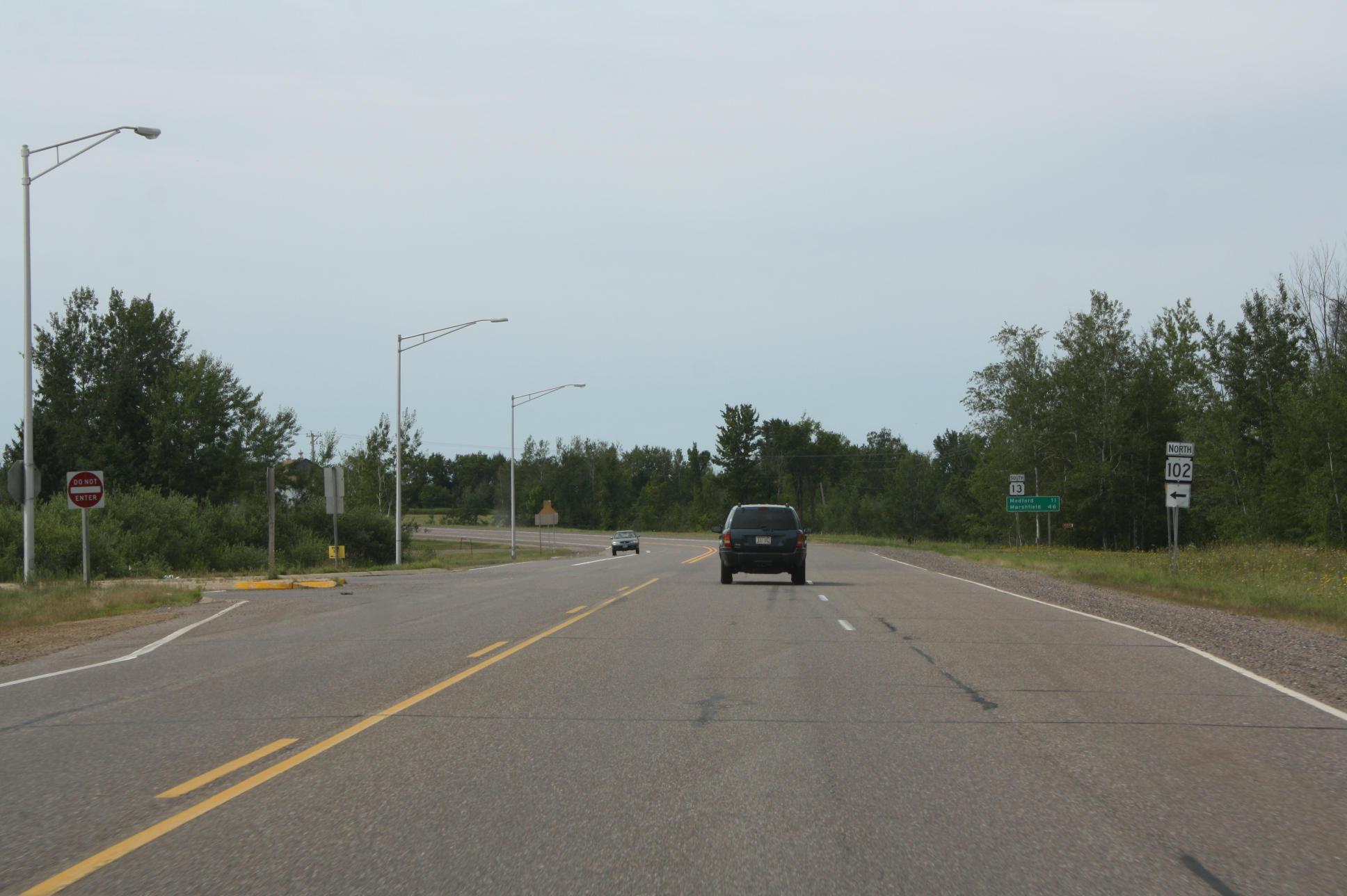
Southwest terminus

WIS 102 begins at a junction with WIS 13 in Taylor County, north of the community of Chelsea. From here, the highway runs east through the town of Westboro. It then enters the town of Rib Lake and turns to the northeast toward the village of Rib Lake. The highway passes through the village, intersecting County Highway D before running along the north shore of Rib Lake. After leaving the village to the east, WIS 102 meets County Highway C before turning to the north. It heads north through a forested area, curving along the eastern side of Spirit Lake shortly before entering Price County. In Price County, WIS 102 continues north through forests in the town of Spirit. The route meets County Highway YY and follows the highway east before turning northward again. Upon entering the community of Spirit, WIS 102 terminates at a junction with WIS 86.

== Major intersections ==
| County | Location | mi | km | Destinations | Notes |
|---|---|---|---|---|---|
| Taylor | Town of Westboro | 0.0 | 0.0 | WIS 13 – Ashland, Medford | Southern terminus |
| Price | Community of Spirit | 18.2 | 29.3 | WIS 86 – Ogema, Tomahawk | Northern terminus |
1.000 mi = 1.609 km; 1.000 km = 0.621 mi
