= Westboro, Wisconsin =

Town in the United States

- Town
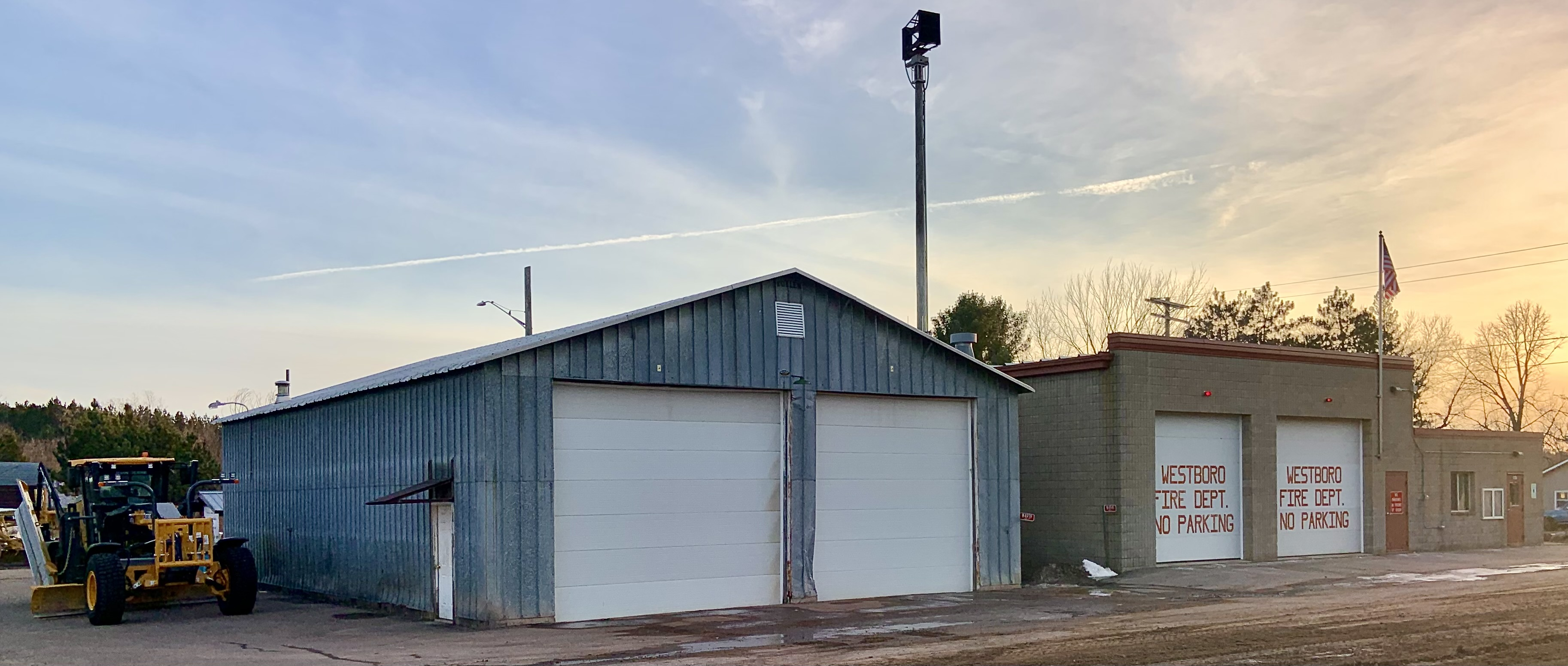
- Town hall

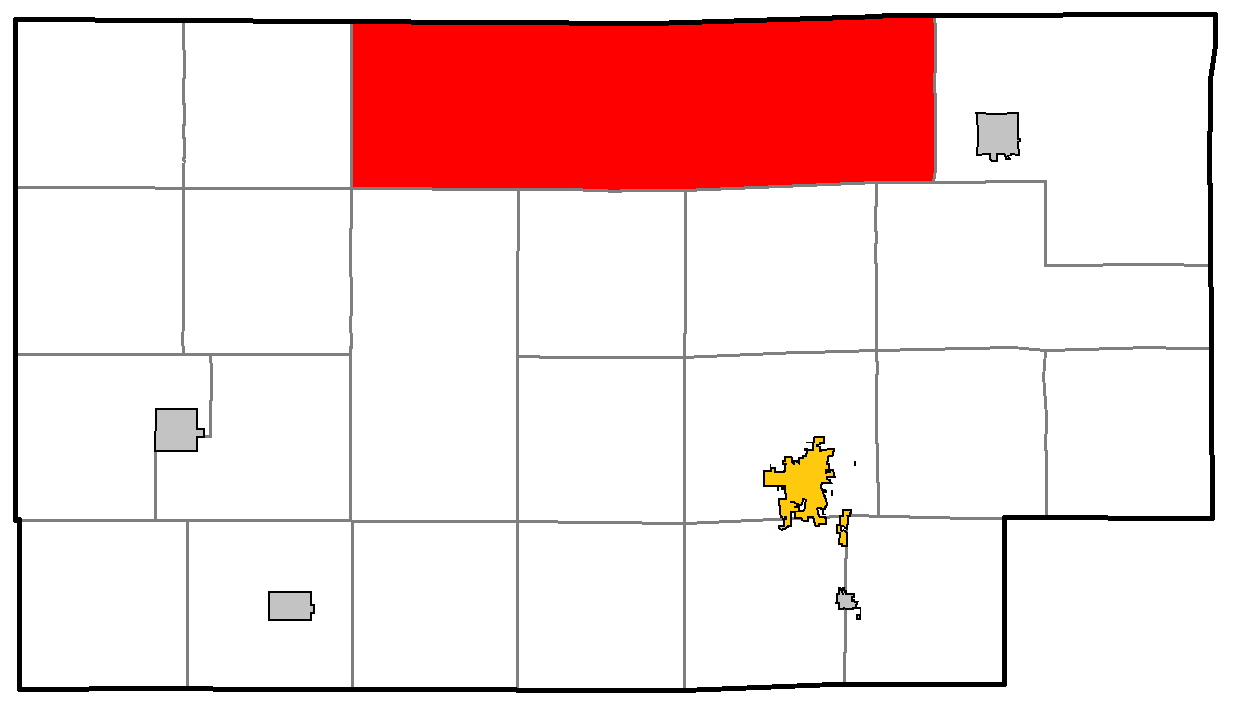
- Location of Westboro, within Taylor County

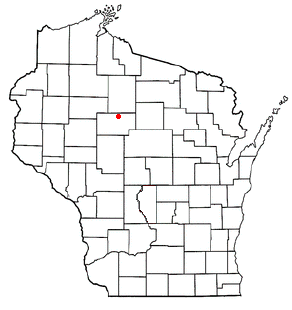
- Location of Westboro, Wisconsin
- Coordinates: 45°20′17″N 90°25′50″W
- Country: United States
- State: Wisconsin
- County: Taylor

Area
  - Total: 125.4 sq mi (324.9 km^{2})
  - Land: 124.1 sq mi (321.4 km^{2})
  - Water: 1.4 sq mi (3.5 km^{2})
- Elevation: 1,473 ft (449 m)

Population (2020)
  - Total: 693
  - Density: 5.58/sq mi (2.16/km^{2})
- Time zone: UTC-6 (Central (CST))
  - Summer (DST): UTC-5 (CDT)
- Area codes: 715 & 534
- FIPS code: 55-85450
- GNIS feature ID: 1584401
- PLSS township: T33N R2W, T33N R1W, T33N R1E, and part of T33N R2E
- Website: http://townofwestboro.com

Westboro is a town in Taylor County, Wisconsin, United States. The population was 693 at the 2020 census. The census-designated place of Westboro is located in the town. The unincorporated community of Queenstown is also located in the town.

== Geography ==
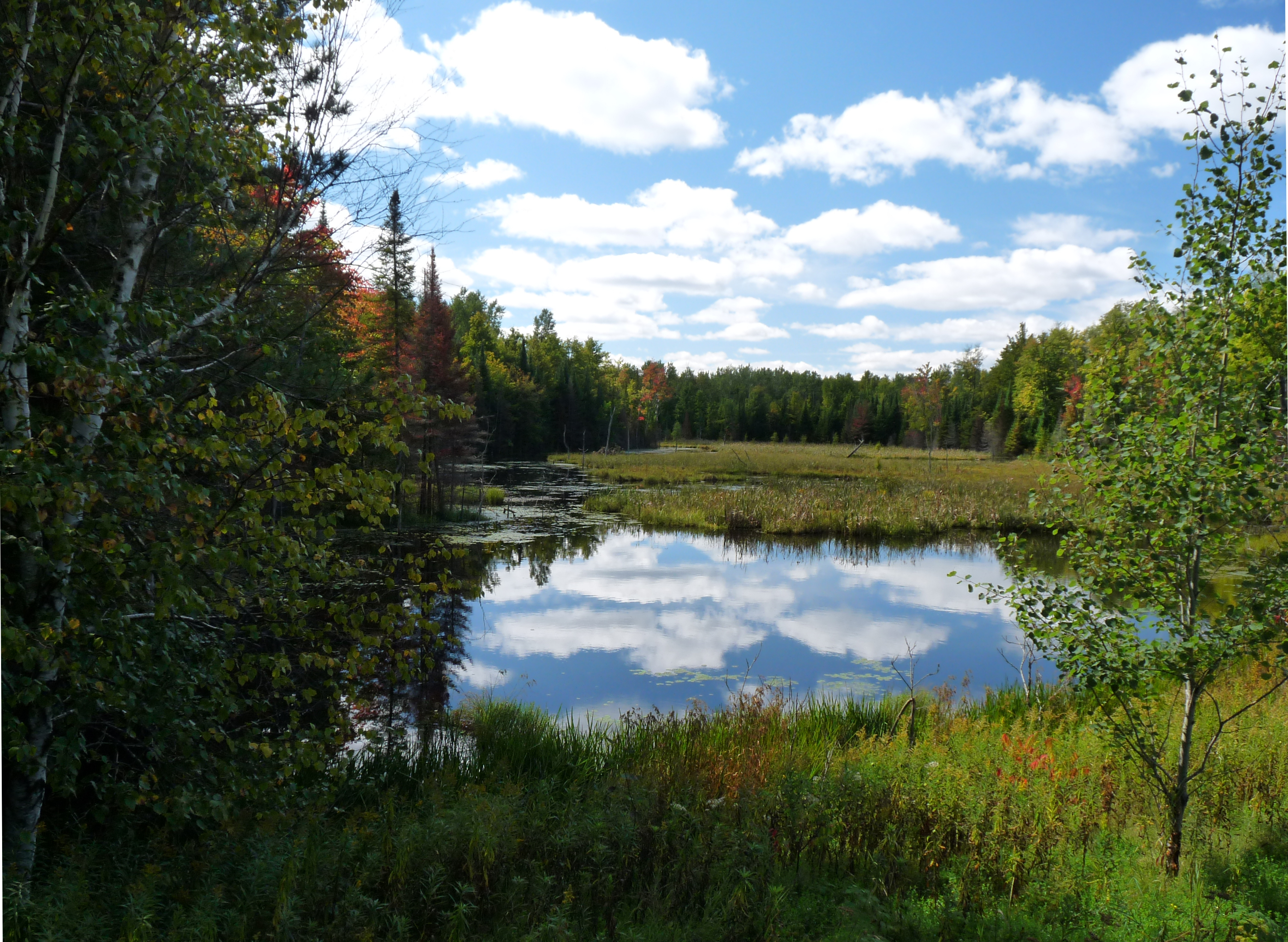
Much of the town is wild national forest land – wooded hills sprinkled with bogs and little lakes, like this one along CTH D.

Westboro is the largest town in Taylor County. Instead of the typical six miles by six, it is six by twenty miles. According to the United States Census Bureau, the town has a total area of 125.4 square miles (324.9 km^{2}), of which 124.1 square miles (321.4 km^{2}) is land and 1.3 square miles (3.5 km^{2}) (1.07%) is water.

Westboro contains three of Taylor County's twelve Wisconsin State Natural Areas: Kidrick Swamp SNA, Silver Creek & Mondeaux River SNA, and part of Mondeaux Hardwoods SNA.

== History ==
In 1847, surveyors working for the U.S. government walked the six mile squares that would become the town of Westboro. They marked off the outlines of those squares on foot using compass and chain. A crew came back in 1858 to survey all the section lines. When done, the deputy surveyor filed a general description for each six-mile square. Of them, the description of west-central Westboro (T33N R1W) is clearest:

This Township contains a few Tamarac and Cedar Swamps of Small extent, most of them unfit for cultivation. The surface is a Rolling Soil first and Second rate. Timber chiefly Hemlock Birch, Maple, Pine, Tamarac and Cedar. There is a large Windfall runs across the North West corner bears in South West and North East Direction Timber Decayed and grown to second Growth Popler.

There is several creeks in this Township among which is the Yellow River runs in a North Westerly course across the South West corner of the Township. It is a deep and narrow Stream flows in a gentle current, not good for forming Motive Power for Mill. There is another Stream of considerable extent enters the Township near the South East corner and runs in a gentle current Northwesterly. It is a deep narrow Stream banks low and principally lined with Alder.

A different surveyor in 1862 was more enthusiastic about east-central Westboro, the six mile square where most of the population is today:

A large portion of this Township is valuable for its splendid White Pine, also for its good soil. The surface is rolling and Timber heavy.

In the early 1870s the Wisconsin Central Railroad Company built its line up from Medford through the forest that would become Westboro. To finance this undertaking, the railroad was granted half the land for 18 miles on either side of the track laid - generally the odd-numbered sections. The railroad established stations at Whittlesey, Chelsea, and what would become the village of Westboro. Settlers first arrived in 1874. When Taylor County was formed in 1875, the Town of Westboro was six miles north to south same as today, but it spanned the full width of the county, including all modern towns from McKinley to Rib Lake.

In 1878 John Duncan had a "pole line" tramway hauling logs north along Fisher Creek to the millpond in Westboro to feed to his sawmill. The pole line was a track of hardwood saplings spiked to hardwood ties, over which horses pulled carts loaded with wood.

By 1880 the town had a population of 230. The village had two sawmills, two stores, two hotels, three saloons, and a school. Outside the railroad and the village, an 1880 map shows some sort of road running east three miles from town to James Lake. Another road runs two miles west, running north of Silver Creek. Then this road joins with what is labelled "Winter Road." This was a logging tote road which followed Silver Creek west through the forests, then crossed over to the Yellow River watershed and followed that river into Chippewa County. This trail was used to shuttle supplies to logging camps during the winter logging season. During this phase the loggers focused on cutting white pine - the most valuable tree - floating the logs down Silver Creek and the Yellow River in spring log drives.

In 1885 the town of Rib Lake was split off from the east end of Westboro.

A map from around 1900 shows a good number of homesteads along the railroad and along the two roads previously mentioned. A rail spur had been built from Chelsea toward Rib Lake across the south end of the town and across the end of Wellington Lake. That railroad track was paralleled by some sort of road following the course of modern highway 102, with settlers along it. Many settlers had established homesteads around Chelsea and a road zigzagged along the course of modern Chelsea Avenue west of Shearer Lake. A rural school was marked on that road. Another school was marked two miles to the north on what would become Rindt Road, near more homesteads. Another was where modern Gunnar Road meets Fischer Creek Road and another east of Westboro on what would become Lucia Road. West of Westboro was another rural school on a forerunner of Silver Creek Road. A little further west, that road turned south and crossed Silver Creek, turning west again to follow the course of modern County D almost ten miles beyond the Mondeaux River, then turning north, where a handful of homesteads cluster. Beyond that, no homesteads or roads are marked in the township until the Broederville settlement on the Jump River - then a part of Westboro. Major landholders were the Wisconsin Central Railroad throughout most of the area, J. Duncan near his sawmill in Westboro, N. Wisconsin Land Company, Ramsay Land Company, and along the Yellow River, Chippewa Lumber and Boom and W.J.Starr.

In 1902 the western twelve miles of Westboro was split off into a new Town of McKinley, which then included the modern town of Jump River.

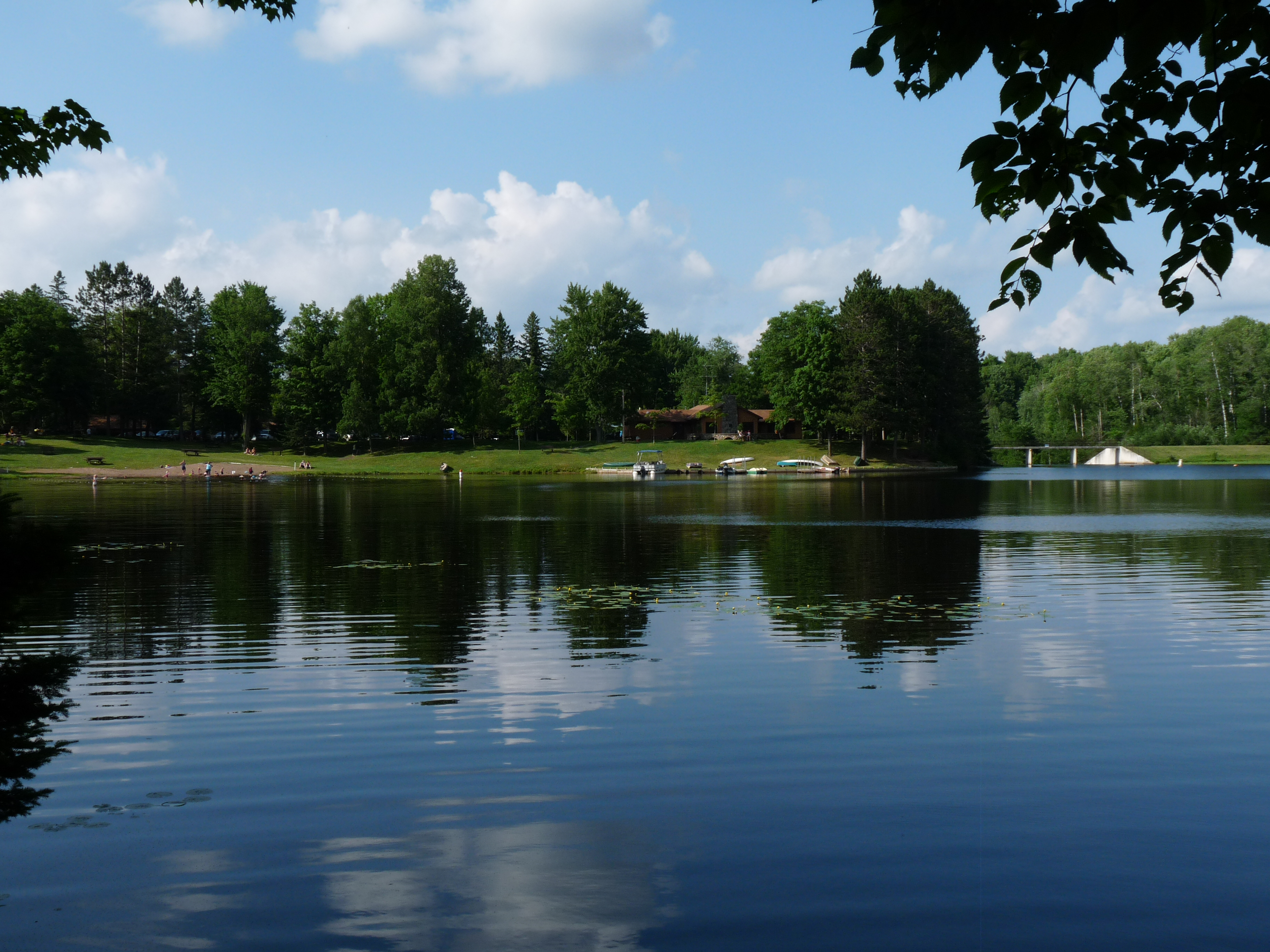
Mondeaux Dam Recreation Area, in the Chequamegon National Forest

The 1911 plat maps show more roads and more homesteads. On the east end around the railroad, a few roads had been extended and some lumber company land had been split up and sold to settlers. Not a lot had changed since 1900, but a new railroad wound west through the forests. This was the Westboro Logging Line, a logging railroad started in 1900 by the Heidrich and Matson Lumber Company, which had bought Duncan's sawmill in Westboro and his timber holdings. In 1902 that company was in turn bought by Pennsylvania investors and renamed the Westboro Lumber Company. The Westboro Logging Line eventually reached twelve miles west of Westboro, across Mondeaux Creek to the north fork of the Yellow River. On the 1911 map a new rural school and a few more settlers had appeared on what is now Heldstab Road. Beyond that, a few families had settled out near where the Jump River fire lookout would later be built, with a new rural school nearby. Other than that, the west end was still owned by companies, with the Wisconsin Central Railway and the Yellow River Lumber Company holding the largest shares.

In 1933 much of the cut-over west half of the town of Westboro was designated part of the Chequamegon National Forest. Starting that year, a Civilian Conservation Corps camp at Mondeaux developed the Mondeaux Dam Recreation Area.

== Demographics ==
As of the census of 2000, there were 660 people, 261 households, and 179 families residing in the town. The population density was 5.3 people per square mile (2.1/km^{2}). There were 371 housing units at an average density of 3 per square mile (1.2/km^{2}). The racial makeup of the town was 98.18% White, 0.61% African American, 0.15% Asian, and 1.06% from two or more races. Hispanic or Latino people of any race were 0.3% of the population.

There were 261 households, out of which 35.2% had children under the age of 18 living with them, 57.9% were married couples living together, 4.6% had a female householder with no husband present, and 31.4% were non-families. 26.4% of all households were made up of individuals, and 12.3% had someone living alone who was 65 years of age or older. The average household size was 2.53 and the average family size was 3.08.

In the town, the population was spread out, with 28.2% under the age of 18, 6.8% from 18 to 24, 28% from 25 to 44, 24.5% from 45 to 64, and 12.4% who were 65 years of age or older. The median age was 37 years. For every 100 females, there were 103.1 males. For every 100 females age 18 and over, there were 104.3 males.

The median income for a household in the town was $33,021, and the median income for a family was $37,031. Males had a median income of $29,886 versus $21,354 for females. The per capita income for the town was $14,018. About 6.3% of families and 11.7% of the population were below the poverty line, including 18% of those under age 18 and 12.3% of those age 65 or over.

== See also ==
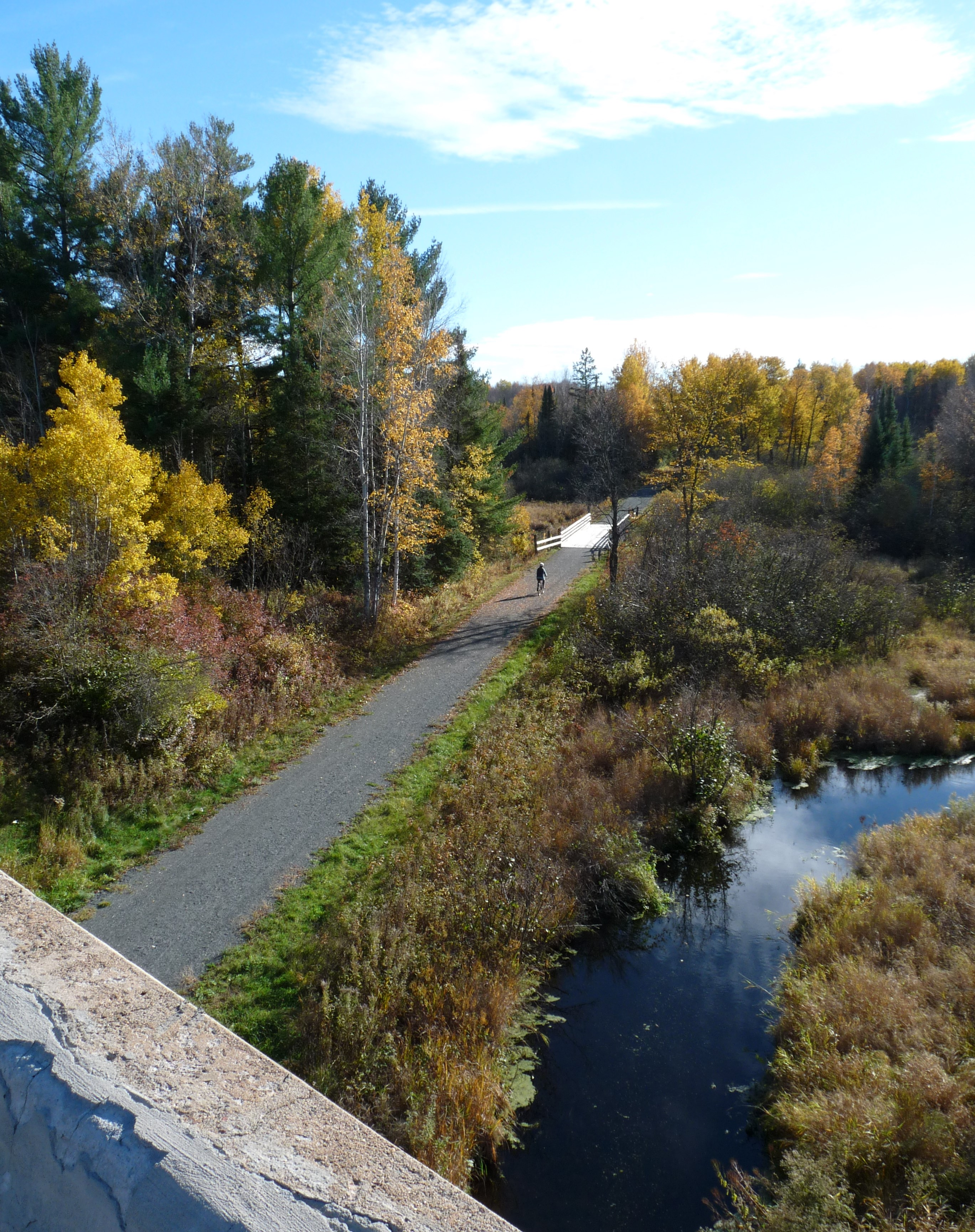
Pine Line trail, south of Westboro

- Pine Line Trail
