= Big Flats =

Big Flats may refer to:

- Big Flats, New York, a town
- Big Flats (CDP), New York, a census-designated place
- Big Flats, Wisconsin, a town
- Big Flats (community), Wisconsin, an unincorporated community

== See also ==
- Big Flat, Arkansas
- Big Flats Airport, New York, a community in Big Flats, New York
