= Spirit, Wisconsin (disambiguation) =

Spirit in the U.S. state of Wisconsin may refer to:

- Spirit, Wisconsin, a town
- Spirit (community), Wisconsin, an unincorporated community
- Spirit Falls, Wisconsin, an unincorporated community
