= Westboro =

Westboro may refer to:

== Places ==
=== Canada ===
- Westboro, Ottawa, Ontario, a neighbourhood
  - Westboro Station (OC Transpo), an OC Transpo Transitway Station

=== United States ===
- Westboro (Topeka), Kansas, a residential neighborhood
- Westboro, Missouri
- Westboro, Ohio
- Westboro, Wisconsin, a town
  - Westboro (CDP), Wisconsin, a census-designated place in the town

== See also ==
- Westborough (disambiguation)
- Westboro Baptist Church
