= Westboro (CDP), Wisconsin =

Census-designated place in Wisconsin, United States

Westboro, Wisconsin
- Census-designated place
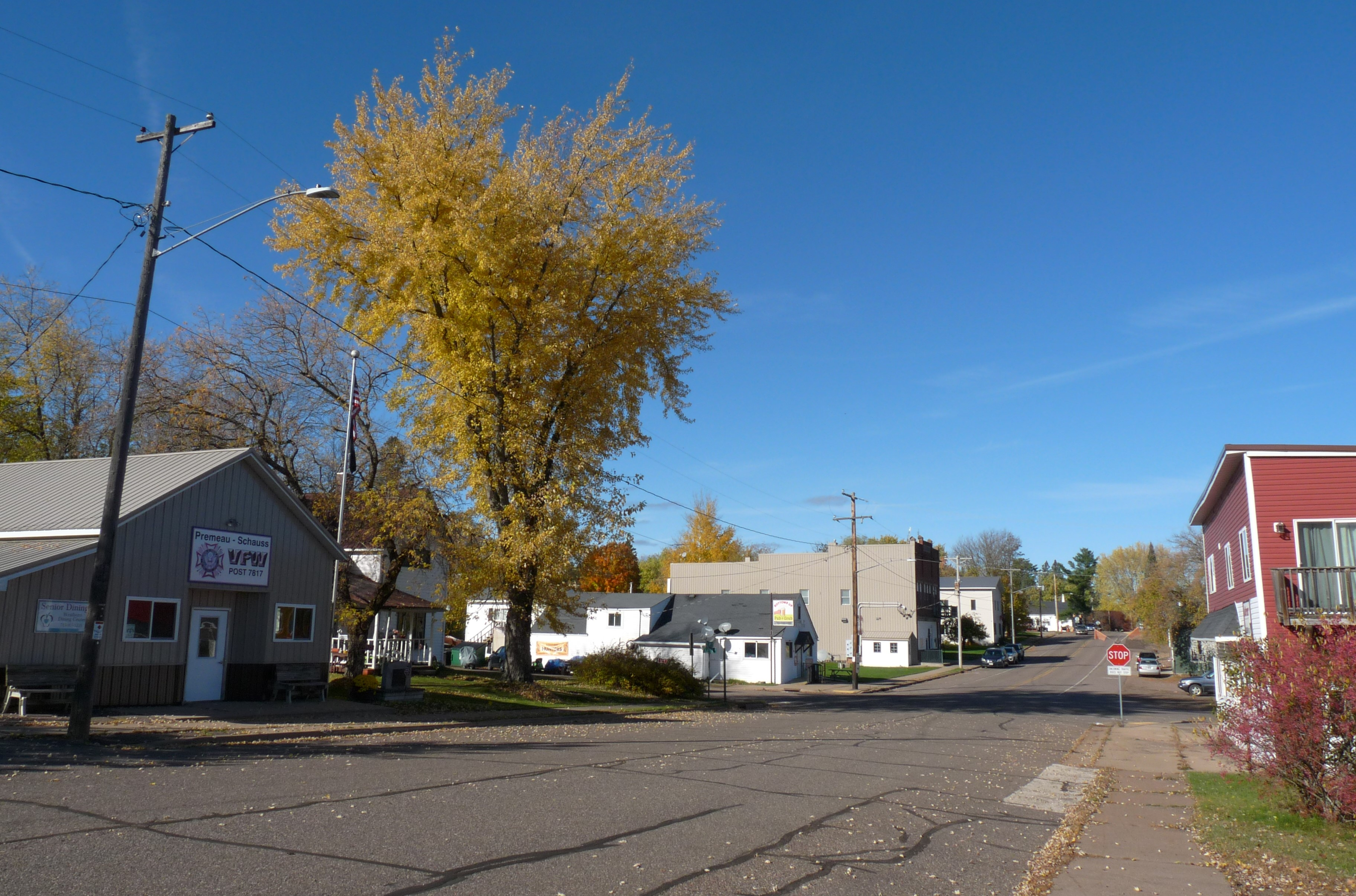

- Location within Wisconsin
- Coordinates: 45°21′19″N 90°17′46″W
- Country: United States
- State: Wisconsin
- County: Taylor

Area
  - Total: 1.846 sq mi (4.78 km^{2})
  - Land: 1.846 sq mi (4.78 km^{2})
  - Water: 0 sq mi (0 km^{2})
- Elevation: 1,519 ft (463 m)

Population (2020)
  - Total: 213
  - Density: 115/sq mi (44.6/km^{2})
- Time zone: UTC-6 (Central (CST))
  - Summer (DST): UTC-5 (CDT)
- ZIP code: 54490
- Area codes: 715 & 534
- GNIS feature ID: 1580763
- Website: http://townofwestboro.com/

Westboro is an unincorporated census-designated place located in the town of Westboro, Taylor County, Wisconsin, United States. Westboro is located near Wisconsin Highway 13, 5 miles (8.0 km) northwest of Rib Lake. It has a post office with ZIP code 54490.

== History ==
Before logging and white settlement, the future site of Westboro lay on an Indian trail running through the forest from Yellow River country to the Wisconsin River. After the Ojibwe ceded this area in 1837, government surveyors came through, marking the section lines. They were followed shortly by timber cruisers who assessed the value of the pine and hardwoods to guide the purchases of speculators and logging companies. Local logging began in the 1850s.

Westboro's first settlers came into the area through Spirit Falls, settling on the east side of Silver Creek on land bought from a man named Emmet Queen - hence the name Queens Town. The Palmers built a sawmill there in 1870. Those earliest settlers lived in tents and log shanties. The first board house was built in 1873.

In 1872 and 1873 the Wisconsin Central Railroad built its line up the west side of Silver Creek, bypassing Queens Town. The railroad hired locals to cut ties for ten cents apiece and to provide firewood for its locomotives. With the railroad in town, things began to change. A new village was platted west of the creek in 1874, eventually called Westboro - probably named for Westborough, Massachusetts, since the Wisconsin Central named other towns along its line for communities near Boston, where most of its investors lived - e.g. Chelsea, Medford, etc. In 1875 the Duncans, Taylor and Richie built a second sawmill on Silver Creek to compete with Palmer's mill. That same year the first school was established. The population of the community was then about 200 - mostly men. The Palmer House hotel was built east of the depot the next year, and five other hotels followed in the next ten years. The town had four saloons in 1876. A jail was added in 1878. By 1884 Methodists, Episcopalians, and Swedish Lutherans had each built a church in town. Catholic and Baptist church buildings came later. Travelling Catholic priests held mass in homes and community halls until 1906, when they built their first church.

In 1885 the Duncans built a tannery near Silver Creek, using hemlock bark from the surrounding forests in the tanning process until 1902, when the tannery burned. Grittner and Grossman built another sawmill in 1885, and Grittner and cobbler Frank Ruprich started a general store in 1890. Ruprich bought out Grittner's share, and when the original wooden store burned in 1911, he rebuilt the store as the large brick building that still stands. The cemetery was established in 1883, and a pest house was added south of town in 1888. A town hall was built around 1890 and the following year a community well was dug in the middle of the intersection of Center and Front Street, which is now Old 13.

The Palmer and Duncan timber empires were in competition - bitter competition at times. Duncans built a dam on Silver Creek on the south side of town. Once, when Palmers had a log drive coming down the creek, Duncans opened their dam, aiming to create a jam so they could claim unmarked Palmer logs. This almost led to a shoot-out, but Palmers persuaded the railroad to quickly lay a spur to the pile of logs, so Palmers' logs could be extracted by rail.

Logging operations left large chunks of the surrounding land covered with dead tree limbs and weeds, and wildfires were a threat. In 1895 the town board organized eleven township fire brigades, and began fining those who started fires in the summer without permits. In 1896 the people of Westboro voted down a proposal to stop the town from issuing liquor licenses, but in 1899 the board established a blacklist of habitual liquor abusers who should not be sold alcohol by the local saloons.

One-room schools were added in the surrounding country as farms were established. With the arrival of school buses in the 1920s, the rural schools were gradually merged back into one centralized elementary school in town. A high school was established in town around 1904 or 1906 and operated until 1963, when the students were merged into the Rib Lake school district.

By 1900 the hamlet of Westboro had grown to about 900 people, with seven saloons and a doctor. By this time, Westboro's original lumber barons - Palmer, Duncan & company - had moved on to greener pastures. In 1902 much of the timber operations in Westboro were bought by Pennsylvania investors and renamed the Westboro Lumber Company. In 1903 the town board passed an ordinance to keep livestock from roaming the streets - a clear marker of creeping civilization. That same year the town built a plank sidewalk from the bridge over Silver Creek into Queen's Town. The Silver Creek Band built a bandstand over the well at the intersection of Front and Center streets. Around 1904 the town had a weekly newspaper, the Westboro Herald. In 1905 Westboro's chapter of Woodmen of the World built a large lodge with a stage for live shows; it later showed early movies and high school basketball games, and was sold to the town in 1919 as a community hall. Westboro's first automobile - a Model T - appeared in 1909. The Westboro State Bank opened in 1910. The wagon road that ran down to Chelsea and Medford was taken over by the state in 1911, becoming highway 13. With that, the state had the well removed from Westboro's central intersection, considering it an unacceptable hazard on a state highway. (This change was unpopular with the locals, so the town board had it done under cover of darkness.) In 1913 the town board decided that new sidewalks should be concrete, rather than boardwalks, to reduce maintenance. Telephones came to Westboro around 1916.

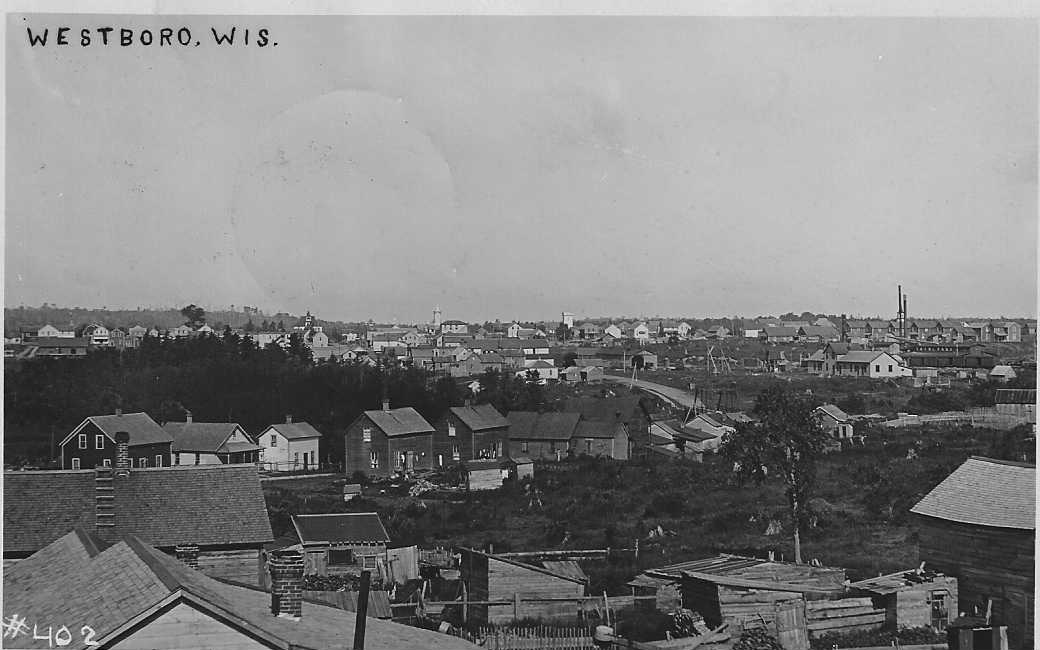
Postcard view of Westboro from around 1910, when the town was booming

Westboro Lumber Company's mill was north of where modern D crosses Silver Creek, on the flat between the railroad and the creek. In 1903 the company installed a dynamo in its plant, which offered electricity to the village. The company added a planing mill, a rooming house, a general store, a barn for its horses, and eventually used three locomotives to haul in pine, hemlock and hardwood from their thirty miles of track spreading west of town. The mill sawed as much as 100,000 board feet of lumber per day. Westboro boomed for a while, but by 1922 the mill was running out of timber, so Westboro Lumber shut down and moved its operations to Panama.

Westboro's population had peaked in 1913 at 1300, not far below Medford's population at that time. With the closing of Westboro Lumber in 1922, population began to decline faster. With the mill gone, different schemes attempted to fill the economic void. Ever since settlers had started little farms in the cut-over, they had kept a cow or two for milk. Many of those farms gradually expanded their dairy operations and by 1915 the Westboro Creamery Company was buying cans of milk from local farmers. Sheep-grazing was another early use of the cut-over lands. From around 1910 to 1918 the Wayman-Hugobom ranch shipped up to ten rail cars of lambs each fall. A cucumber-processing plant didn't last long. A tornado touched down south of town in 1924, killing three children and injuring several adults. The state bank examiner shut down the Westboro State Bank in 1926. That same year, Lake Superior Power and Light brought reliable electricity to town.

During the Great Depression of the 1930s, jobs and money became even scarcer. Some people couldn't make payments on their loans and their mortgages were foreclosed. In 1933 the New Deal WPA helped the town expand the old Woodman's hall for basketball and put a basement under it, but it burned in 1945. The REA strung electric lines to farms around Westboro through the 1930s. After WWII, things looked up. The town funded a new library building in 1949 with an increase in the fee for liquor licenses. The local VFW post and the Westboro Conservation Club were established in 1949. That year the town also purchased a used fire truck for its volunteer fire department, and built a firehouse in 1954.

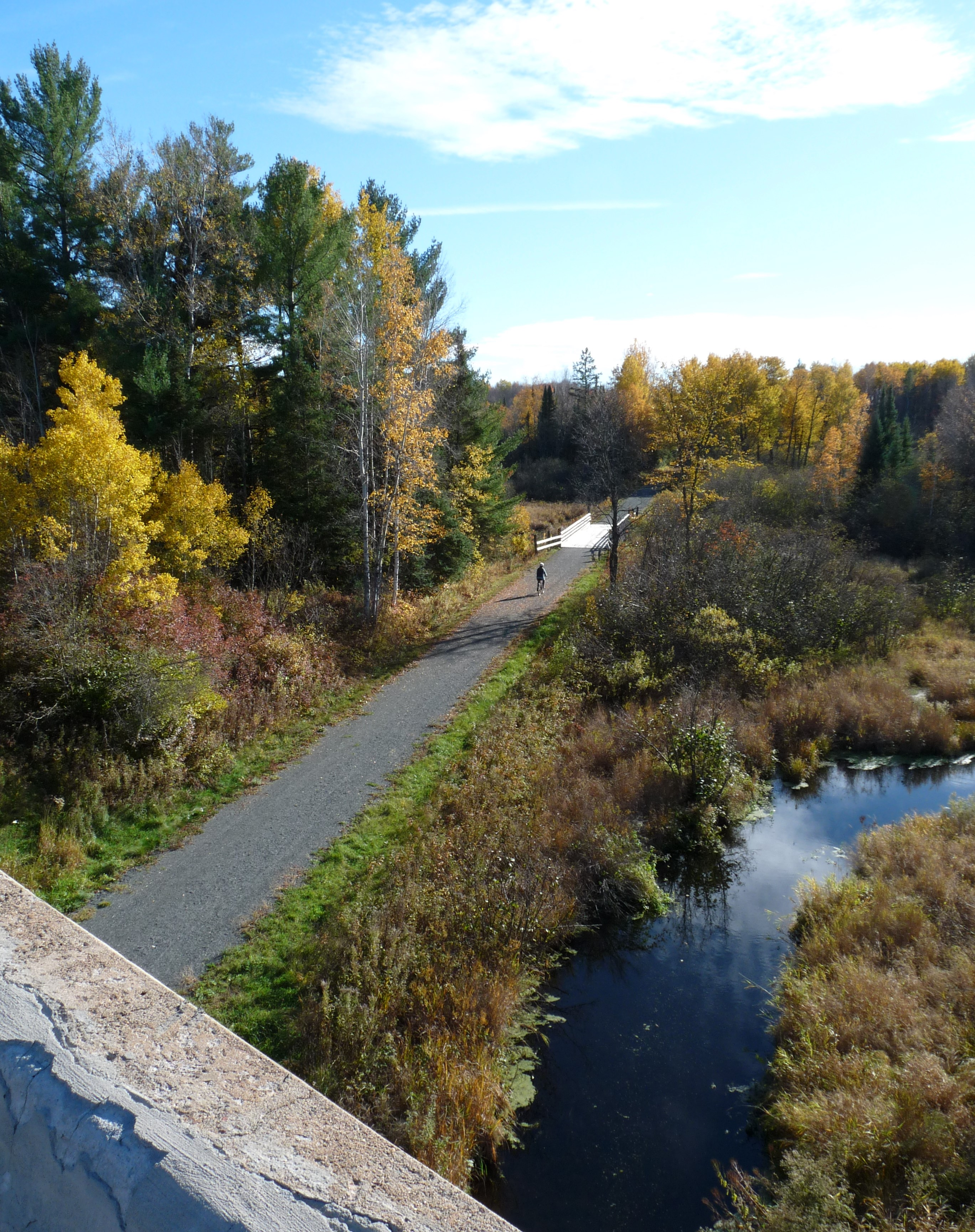
The Pine Line Trail, heading south from Westboro along Fischer Creek

Around 1970 highway 13 was rerouted to bypass downtown Westboro. Various efforts were made over the years to bring new commerce to the town. In 1974 William Peterson moved his machine tool shop from Illinois to a garage in Westboro, manufacturing components for NASA and jet aircraft. Railroad traffic had dwindled ever since the sawmill closed and automobiles became common, and the Wisconsin Central finally quit running trains through Westboro in 1988. The following year local residents negotiated an agreement to use the road-bed as a recreational trail - the Pine Line.
