= Wisconsin Highway 13 =

Highway in Wisconsin

State Trunk Highway 13
- POW/MIA Memorial Highway
- WIS 13 highlighted in red

Route information
- Maintained by WisDOT
- Length: 338.32 mi (544.47 km)
- Tourist routes: Lake Superior Circle Tour

Major junctions
- South end: I-90 / I-94 in Wisconsin Dells
- US 12 / WIS 16 / WIS 23 in Wisconsin Dells; US 10 / WIS 34 in Junction City; US 10 in Marshfield; WIS 29 in Abbotsford; US 8 in Prentice; US 2 in Ashland
- North end: US 2 / US 53 / LSCT in Superior

Location
- Country: United States
- State: Wisconsin
- Counties: Sauk, Columbia, Adams, Wood, Portage, Marathon, Clark, Taylor, Price, Ashland, Bayfield, Douglas

Highway system
- Wisconsin State Trunk Highway System; Interstate; US; State; Scenic; Rustic
← US 12	→ US 14

State Trunk Highway 13 (often called Highway 13, STH-13 or WIS 13) is a state highway running north–south across northwest and central Wisconsin. WIS 13 serves as a major north–south route connecting the communities of Wisconsin Dells, Wisconsin Rapids, Marshfield and Ashland. WIS 13 is part of the Lake Superior Circle Tour from its northern/western terminus to Ashland at its eastern junction with U.S. Highway 2 (US 2). The road also provides access to the Apostle Islands National Lakeshore off the Lake Superior shoreline at Bayfield. The highway is two-lane surface road with the exception of various urban multilane road sections.

== Route description ==
=== Wisconsin Dells to Marshfield ===
WIS 13 begins at Interstate 90/Interstate 94 (I-90/I-94) and passes east through Wisconsin Dells as an urban multilane highway, crossing US 12 and merging with WIS 16 and WIS 23 east through the city. WIS 13 then turns north, while WIS 23 heads east and WIS 16 heads south one mile (1.6 km) east of the city. WIS 13 follows the Wisconsin River north through Adams County, passing through Plainville, Adams and Friendship. The highway then crosses WIS 21 three miles (4.8 km) north of Friendship and finally passes through Cottonville, Big Flats and Rome before entering Wood County.

In Wood County, WIS 13 crosses WIS 73 four miles (6.4 km) east of Nekoosa before entering Wisconsin Rapids. WIS 13 joins WIS 54 south at the Riverview Expressway, a short bypass of the downtown area. The two highways split two miles (3.2 km) west of their join point, and WIS 13 merges with WIS 73 north. At the junction with WIS 34, WIS 73 turns westerly via West Grand Ave, and WIS 13 continues due northerly concurrent with WIS 34 for approximately 12 miles (19 km) before intersecting the US 10 expressway three miles (4.8 km) west of Junction City at exit 204. There, WIS 13 turns to follow US 10 west toward Marshfield, following the US 10 expressway bypassing Milladore, Blenker, and Auburndale. At exit 186 (CTH-A/Veterans Parkway) on the south side of Marshfield, WIS 13 exits the US 10 expressway to head north into Marshfield on Veterans Parkway. WIS 13 enters Marathon County after passing through Marshfield.

The four-lane road in Marshfield is also known as Veterans Parkway. This section was built to alleviate congestion in downtown Marshfield along Central Avenue.

=== Marshfield to Ashland ===
WIS 13 heads northwest to Spencer where it turns north to follow the Marathon–Clark county line, passing through Unity, Colby and Abbotsford (where it junctions with WIS 29) and around Dorchester. The highway then enters Taylor County where it passes through Stetsonville and crosses WIS 64 on the east side of Medford. North of Medford, WIS 13 meanders around Whittlesey, Chelsea and Westboro. The highway enters Price County two miles (3.2 km) north of Westboro.

In Price County, WIS 13 reaches the WIS 86 terminus at Ogema and crosses US 8 near Prentice. The highway then turns northwest to Phillips. The route turns north again out of Phillips to head into Fifield where WIS 70 crosses. WIS 13 then meets WIS 182 at its terminus in Park Falls before heading northwest out of the county into Ashland County. WIS 13 passes through Butternut and Glidden upon entering the county. Two miles (3.2 km) northwest of Glidden, the highway joins with WIS 77 north, and the two highways head north, passing through Cayuga and split with WIS 77 heading east at Mellen and WIS 13 heading northwest, passing through Highbridge, Minersville and Marengo. WIS 13 then heads north to Ashland and joins US 2 west for two miles (3.2 km) and then turns north (as US 2 continues west) along the Lake Superior shoreline in Bayfield County

=== Along the Lake Superior shoreline (Ashland to Superior) ===
WIS 13 closely follows the shore of Chequamegon Bay and passes through Barksdale, Washburn and Bayfield. It is at Bayfield where access to Madeline Island and the Apostle Island National Lakeshore is available. WIS 13 turns westward at Red Cliff and follows the shore of Lake Superior, passing through Cornucopia, Herbster, and Port Wing, before entering Douglas County. One mile after the county line, WIS 13 turns southward to parallel the Brule River State Forest for five miles (8 km), then turns west again. The highway ends at US 2 and US 53 southeast of Superior.

== History ==
With some variation due to realignments over time, the original 1918 routing this highway followed much of today's WIS 13, beginning at what was then Kilbourn (present-day Wisconsin Dells), travelling north through Adams, Grand Rapids (now Wisconsin Rapids), Marshfield, Prentice and Ashland, ending in Bayfield. It was later that STH-13 was routed around the Bayfield Peninsula and westerly to just before Superior. WIS 13 ends in the Town of Parkland at CTH-Z.

The route of WIS 13 previously ran the length of the state from Beloit on the Illinois state line to the Minnesota state line. From Beloit, WIS 13 followed the roads that are now US 51, US 14, US 12 through Janesville and Madison. Additionally, WIS 13 was extended westerly from Bayfield first to Port Wing, then into Superior then across the border to Duluth. In the 1920s, the southern end of WIS 13 was realigned from Evansville to Beloit along what is now WIS 213 after US 14 was commissioned.

WIS 13 was truncated to its present southern terminus in 1961 after I-90 and I-94 were commissioned.

As of late August 2012, WIS 13 was removed as a concurrency with WIS 73 between Wisconsin Rapids and Marshfield. WIS 13 now departs Wisconsin Rapids concurrent with WIS 34 to the new US 10 expressway west of Junction City, and then follows the new US 10 west to Marshfield.

== Major intersections ==
County	Location	mi	km	Destinations	Notes
Sauk	Wisconsin Dells	0.0	0.0	I-90 / I-94 – Tomah, Madison	Trumpet interchange
Sauk	Wisconsin Dells	0.6	0.97	US 12 / WIS 16 west / WIS 23 west – Lyndon Station, Lake Delton	Southern end of WIS 16/WIS 23 concurrency
Columbia	Wisconsin Dells	2.1	3.4	WIS 16 east / WIS 23 east – Endeavor, Portage	Northern end of WIS 16/WIS 23 concurrency
Adams	Plainville	8.5	13.7	CTH-K	
Adams	Springville	13.3	21.4	WIS 82 – Mauston, Oxford	
Adams	Easton	18.1	29.1	CTH-A	
Adams	Grand Marsh	22.5	36.2	CTH-E	
Adams	Adams	26.0	41.8	CTH-M	
Adams	Village of Friendship	27.6	44.4	CTH-J	
Adams	Cottonville	31.2	50.2	WIS 21 – Arkdale, Necedah, Coloma	
Adams	Big Flats	41.1	66.1	CTH-C	
Adams	Rome	44.8	72.1	CTH-D	
Wood	Nekoosa	54.6	87.9	WIS 73 – Nekoosa, Plainfield	
Wood	Wisconsin Rapids	55.9	90.0	WIS 54 east – Plover, Waupaca	Southern end of WIS 54 concurrency
Wood	Wisconsin Rapids	57.0	91.7	WIS 54 west / WIS 73 south – Port Edwards, Black River Falls	Northern end of WIS 54 concurrency; southern end of WIS 73 concurrency
Wood	Wisconsin Rapids	57.8	93.0	WIS 34 north / WIS 73 north – Pittsville, Neillsville	Southern end of WIS 34 concurrency; northern end of WIS 73 concurrency
Wood	Rudolph	65.1	104.8	CTH-C	
Portage	Junction City	72.2	116.2	US 10 east / WIS 34 north – Stevens Point	Southern end of US 10 concurrency; northern end of WIS 34 concurrency
Wood	Marshfield	89.5	144.0	US 10 west – Neillsville	Northern end of US 10 concurrency
Wood	Marshfield	93.2	150.0	WIS 97 north – Stratford	
Marathon	Spencer	102.0	164.2	WIS 98 west / CTH-C east – Loyal	
Marathon	Spencer	105.0	169.0	WIS 153 east – Stratford	
Marathon	Unity	109.0	175.4	CTH-P	
Marathon	Colby	112.0	180.2	CTH-N	
Marathon	Abbotsford	114.0	183.5	WIS 29 – Chippewa Falls, Wausau	Partial cloverleaf interchange
Marathon	Dorchester	119.0	191.5	CTH-A	
Taylor	Stetsonville	124.0	199.6	CTH-A	
Taylor	Medford	129.0	207.6	WIS 64 – Cornell, Merrill	
Taylor	Whittlesey	134.0	215.7	CTH-M	
Taylor	Chelsea	141.0	226.9	WIS 102 north – Rib Lake	
Taylor	Westboro	145.0	233.4	CTH-D	
Price	Ogema	151.0	243.0	WIS 86 east – Ogema, Tomahawk	
Price	Prentice	158.0	254.3	US 8 – Ladysmith, Rhinelander	
Price	Phillips	166.0	267.2	WIS 111 south – Catawba	
Price	Phillips	170.0	273.6	CTH-H / CTH-W	
Price	Fifield	184.0	296.1	WIS 70 – Spooner, Woodruff	
Price	Park Falls	188.0	302.6	WIS 182 east – Springstead, Manitowish	
Ashland	Butternut	194.0	312.2	CTH-F	
Ashland	Glidden	204.0	328.3	CTH-N	
Ashland		207.0	333.1	WIS 77 west – Clam Lake, Hayward	Southern end of WIS 77 concurrency
Ashland	Mellen	220.0	354.1	WIS 77 east – Hurley	Northern end of WIS 77 concurrency
Ashland	Minersville	230.0	370.1	CTH-C	
Ashland		233.0	375.0	WIS 112 north – Benoit	
Ashland	Ashland	244.0	392.7	WIS 137 west (6th St.)	
Ashland	Ashland	245.0	394.3	US 2 east / LSCT – Ironwood	Eastern end of US 2/LSCT concurrency
Bayfield	Ashland	248.0	399.1	US 2 west – Superior	Western end of US 2 concurrency
Bayfield	Washburn	254.0	408.8	CTH-C	
Bayfield	Bayfield	267.0	429.7	CTH-H	Via Ice Road or Ferry
Bayfield	Cornucopia	288.0	463.5	CTH-C	
Bayfield	Port Wing	304.0	489.2	CTH-A	
Douglas		318.0	511.8	CTH-H	
Douglas		327.0	526.3	CTH-F	
Douglas		331.0	532.7	CTH-D	
Douglas		337.0	542.3	CTH-U	
Douglas	Parkland	340.0	547.2	US 2 / US 53 / LSCT / CTH-Z – Ashland, Spooner, Superior	Western end of LSCT concurrency; diamond interchange
1.000 mi = 1.609 km; 1.000 km = 0.621 mi: Concurrency terminus

== Special routes ==
Two special routes exist for WIS 13. The first, in Wisconsin Rapids, runs downtown from Riverview Expressway (WIS 13 and WIS 54) along North 8th Street, then west along Avon Street, Jackson Street and West Grand Avenue, ending at the junction of WIS 34, WIS 13 and WIS 73. The second, in Marshfield, follows the old alignment of WIS 13 along Central Avenue through downtown.
