= Mondeaux Dam Recreation Area =

Coordinates: 45°20′1″N 90°27′3″W

- U.S. National Register of Historic Places
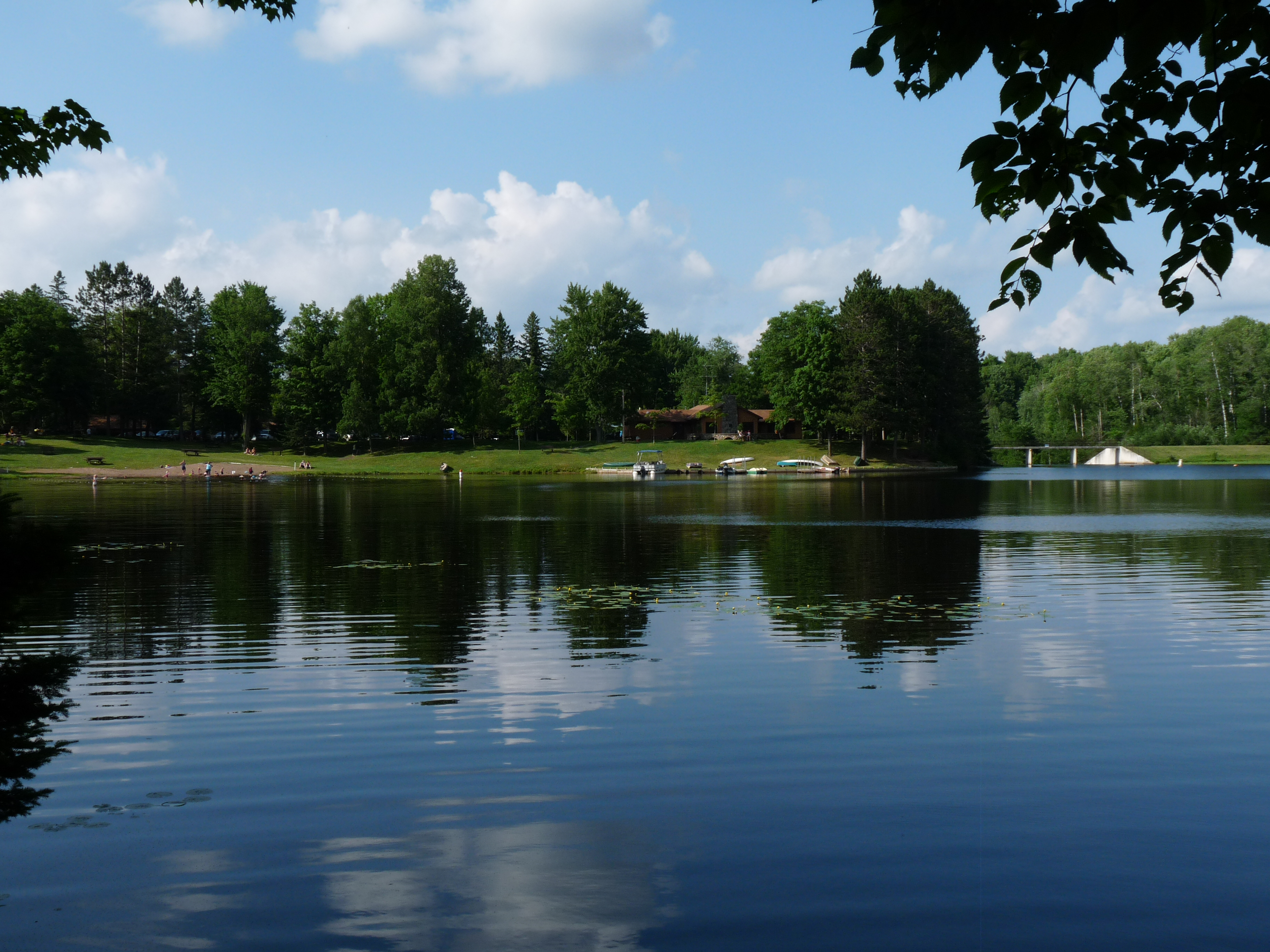
- Location: Westboro, Wisconsin
- Built: 1936-38
- Architectural style: Rustic
- NRHP reference No.: 84003784
- Added to NRHP: August 21, 1984

The Mondeaux Dam Recreation Area is a public park in the forest in the town of Westboro, Wisconsin, United States. The Civilian Conservation Corps (CCC) and Works Progress Administration (WPA) created the lake and facilities during the Great Depression.

The Mondeaux Dam Recreation Area is part of the Chequamegon National Forest. Mondo Dam, as it is referred to by the locals, has four different camping sites including Eastwood, Spearhead Point, and West Point. The Ice Age National Scenic Trail is a hiking trail that runs through the recreation area. The park also offers activities such as fishing, swimming, and boating.

== Background ==
The basin that holds the Mondeaux Flowage, about three miles long and a quarter mile wide, is probably a tunnel channel cut by a meltwater stream beneath the Chippewa Lobe of the last glacier. At some point, an esker formed down the middle of that channel and along the west edge. By early historic times, a stream (the Mondeaux River) flowed northwest through that channel. The current lake is not natural.

By the 1930s, this part of Wisconsin had been logged for fifty years, leaving much of it in stumps and slashings. The logging companies sold some parcels to farmers, who settled and cleared some areas. Many parcels that didn't sell went tax-delinquent, grew up in brush, and were periodically burned by wildfires. In November 1933, the Chequamegon National Forest was established, and the Forest Service began buying land across central Taylor County.

Around that time, three CCC camps were established in the Chequamegon Forest: Camp Perkinstown which planted trees and developed the Perkinstown winter sports area, Camp Jump River near the Jump River fire tower, and Camp Mondeaux River.

== Development ==
CCC Camp Mondeaux River was established in 1933, engaging about 200 young men in logging, fire suppression, building trails, bridges and firebreaks, and other activities to develop the new national forest. Archie Campbell was a mechanic at that CCC camp who lived nearby. He suggested to the camp superintendent the idea of damming the small Mondeaux River on his land to make a lake for the public. In April 1935 the Forest Service bought Archie's (and wife Kay's) land and in 1936 began planning the facility.

In the winter of 1936-37, the CCC men began clearing the flowage basin, cutting the remaining timber, clearing brush, and contouring the ground. In early 1937, the WPA provided local workers to help, and in May they (and the CCC men) began work on the dam. Later that year they began work on three buildings: the Bath and Clubhouse (a.k.a. today's lodge), the caretaker's dwelling, and a garage. The project was a collaboration of the Forest Service, CCC men from away, and local men employed by the WPA; for example in February 1938 the project involved 108 WPA men and 30 CCCs. The structures were completed in late 1938 and the flowage was ready to be flooded.

Next spring, Archie Campbell was selected as the first concessionaire and caretaker of Mondeaux, and it has served the public ever since.

== Today ==
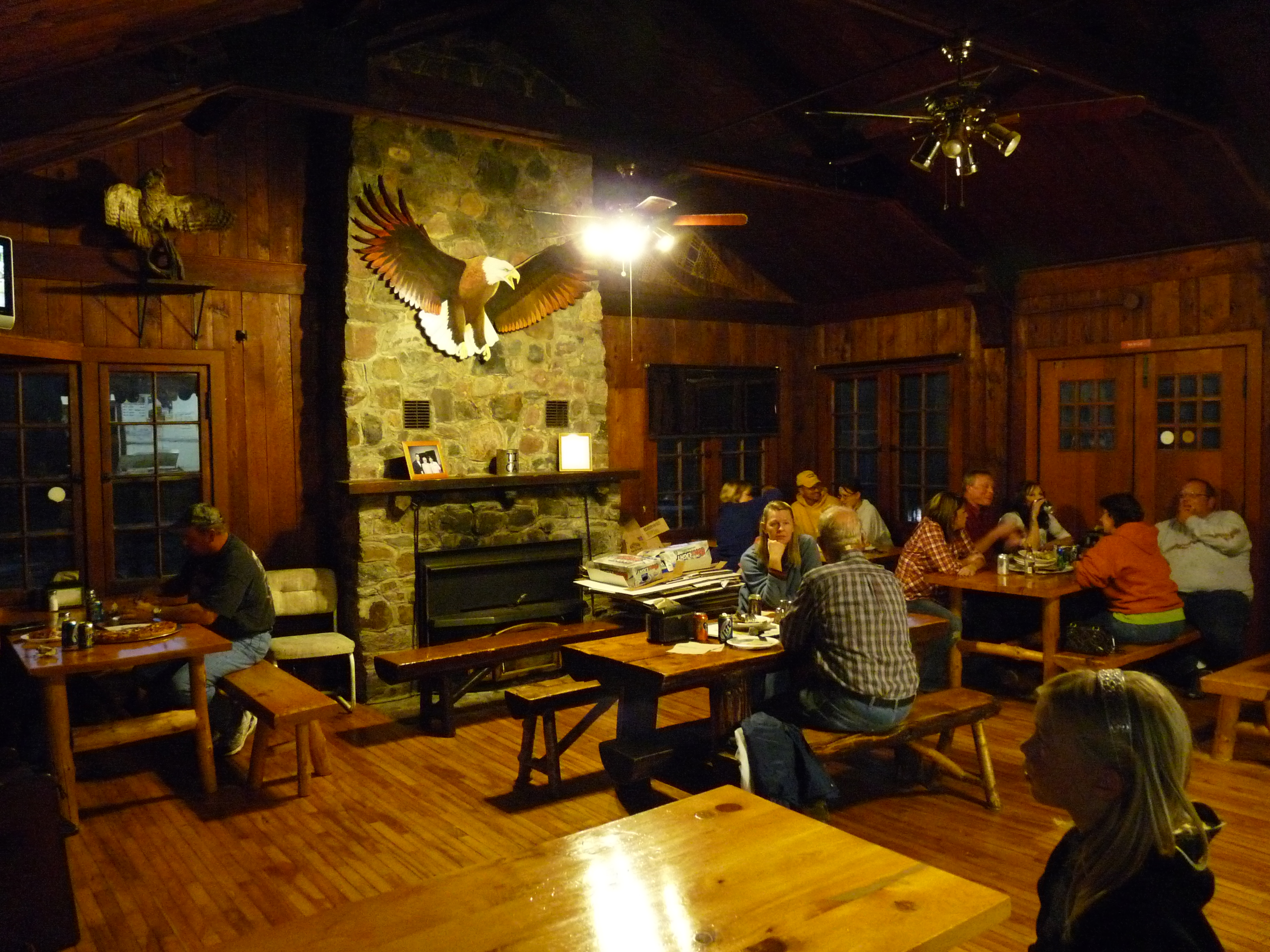
Interior of the lodge/clubhouse, on a Saturday night.

Maintenance and upgrades have occurred over the years, but the dam and buildings remain much as originally built. The buildings are in a rustic style, with rough board and batten exteriors, and fieldstone stonework.

The NRHP nomination paper explains Mondeaux's significance: "...to the people of Taylor County this site evokes a very special feeling which recalls an era of accomplishment in the face of adversity—a local expression of national determinism. ... Soil conservation, water quality protection, improved wildlife habitat, road development and certainly the developed recreational resource are all part of the CCC's impact on Taylor County. However, with the passage of time, many of these accomplishments are not easily discerned, and as such, Mondeaux Dam serves as a dramatic reminder of area history...."

== See also ==
- National Register of Historic Places listings in Taylor County, Wisconsin
