= Westborough (disambiguation) =

Westborough is a town in Massachusetts, United States.

Westborough may also refer to the following places:

== Settlements ==
- Westborough, Lincolnshire, England
- Westborough, Surrey, England
- Westborough station, Massachusetts, United States

== Other places ==
- Westborough (CDP), Massachusetts, United States, within the town of Westborough
- Westborough (ward), Southend-on-Sea, Essex, England
- Westborough Middle School, California, United States

== See also ==
- Westboro (disambiguation)
