= Chelsea, Wisconsin =

- Town
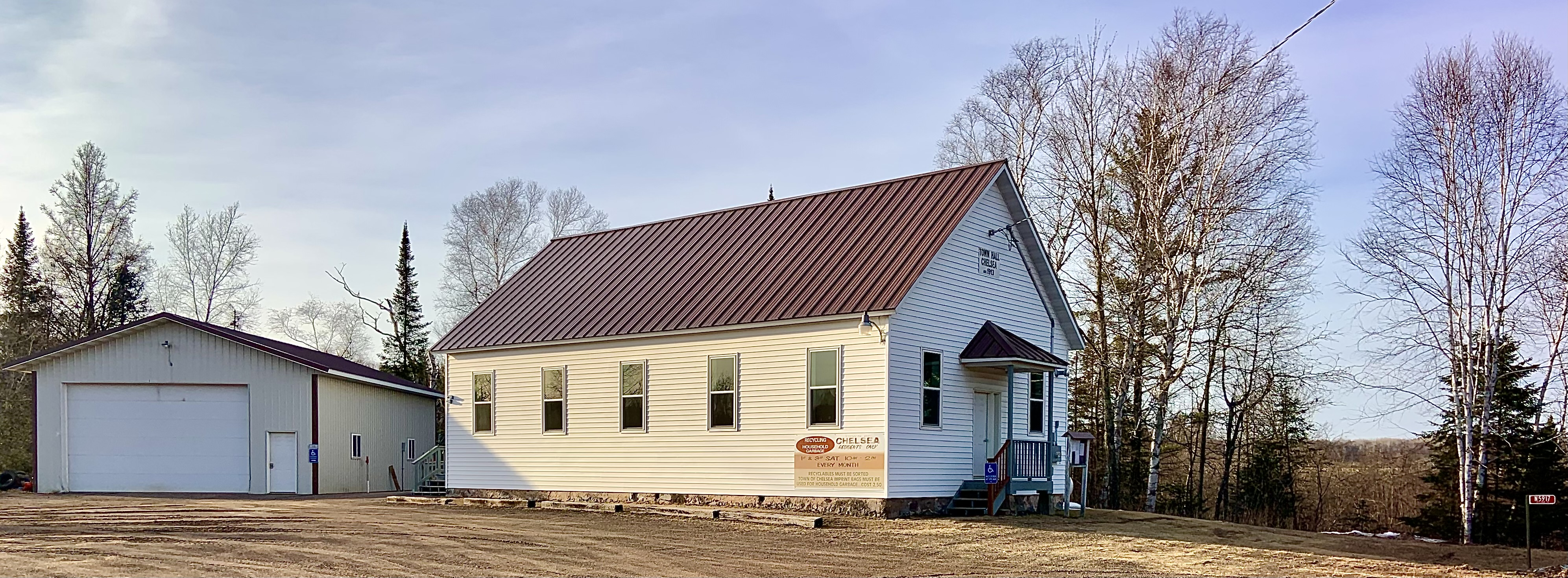
- Town hall

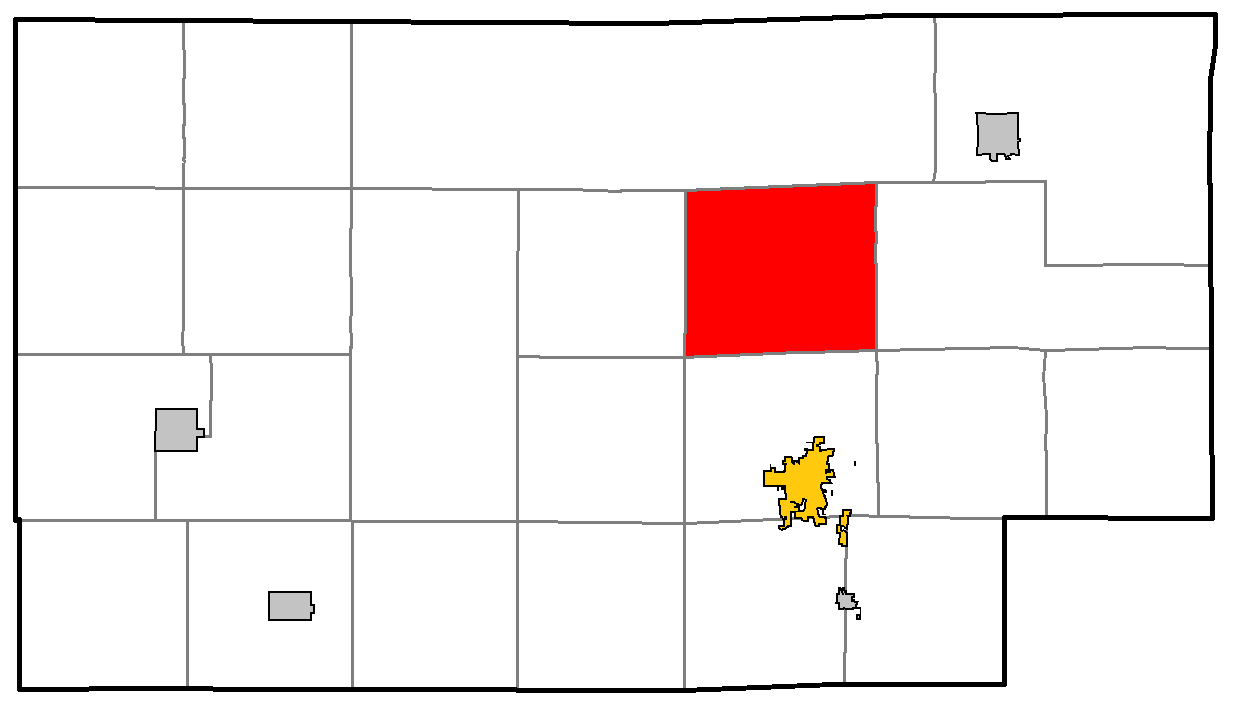
- Location of Chelsea, within Taylor County

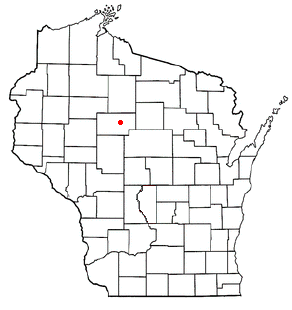
- Location of Chelsea, Wisconsin
- Coordinates: 45°15′43″N 90°21′32″W
- Country: United States
- State: Wisconsin
- County: Taylor

Area
  - Total: 40.85 sq mi (105.8 km^{2})
  - Land: 40.4 sq mi (105 km^{2})
  - Water: 0.45 sq mi (1.2 km^{2})
- Elevation: 1,552 ft (473 m)

Population (2020)
  - Total: 710
  - Density: 18/sq mi (6.8/km^{2})
- Time zone: UTC-6 (Central (CST))
  - Summer (DST): UTC-5 (CDT)
- Area codes: 715 & 534
- FIPS code: 55-14200
- GNIS feature ID: 1582948
- PLSS township: T32N R1E

Chelsea is a town in Taylor County, Wisconsin, United States. The population was 710 at the 2020 census. The census-designated places of Chelsea and Whittlesey are located in the town.

== Geography ==
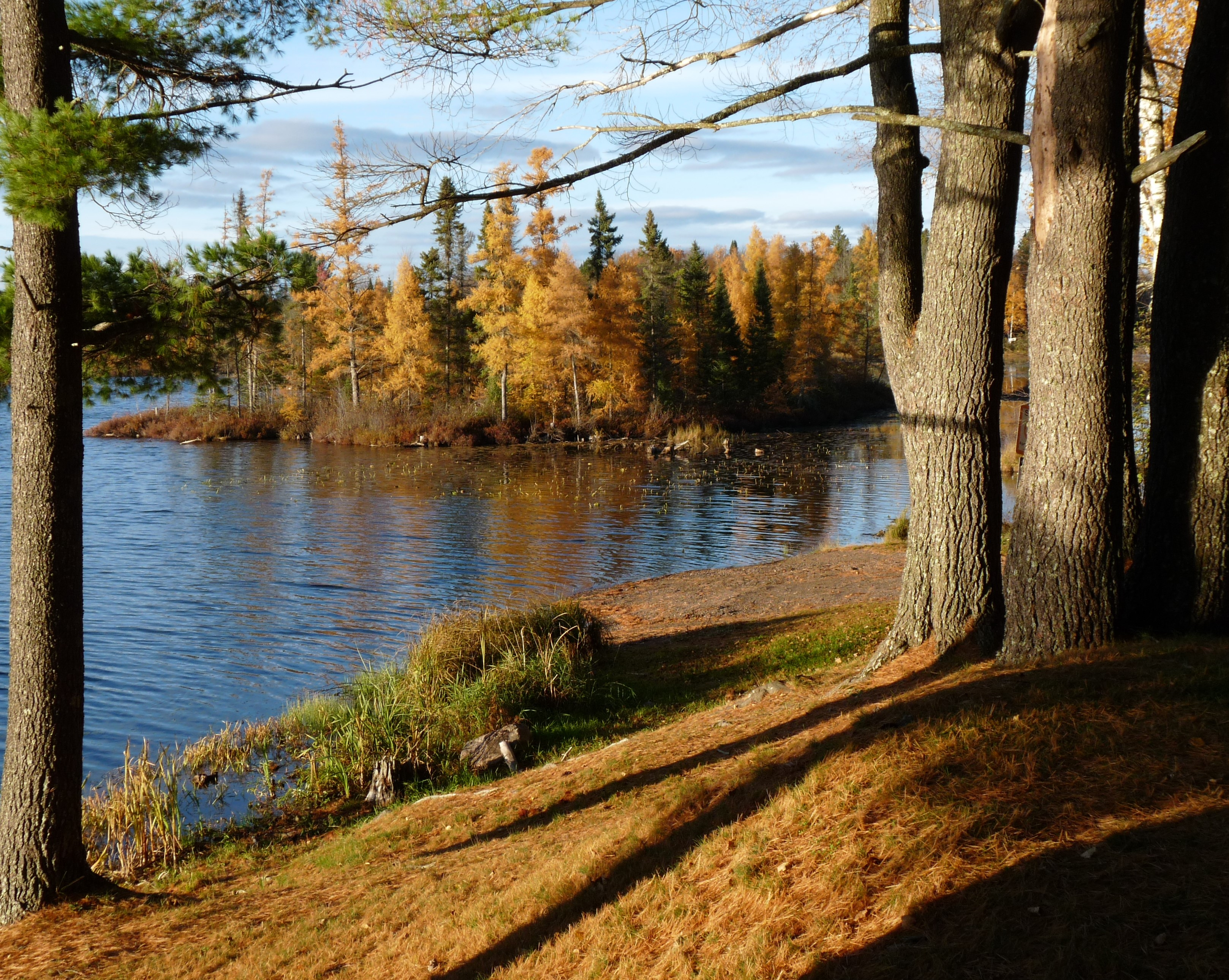
Chelsea Lake, actually just north of Chelsea in the Town of Westboro

According to the United States Census Bureau, the CDP has a total area of 0.46 square miles (1.19 km^{2}), all land.

Most of Chelsea is hilly, with small glacial lakes. It lies within the Perkinstown terminal moraine, which is described under Taylor County.

== History ==
The six by seven mile square that would become Chelsea was first surveyed in 1861 by a crew working for the U.S. government. Then in April 1862 another crew marked all the section corners in the township, walking through the woods and swamps, measuring with chain and compass. When done, the deputy surveyor filed this general description:

The Surface of this Township is generally rolling and considerably Swampy. Timber principally Hemlock mixed with Birch Sugar Spruce (?) Tamarac Cedar and White Pine. It is watered by numerous Small Streams which unite and form two of considerable size one running in a Southerly direction and the other running NW and becoming a tributary of Chipewa river. The Township on the whole would not be very well adapted to agricultural purposes.

In the early 1870s the Wisconsin Central Railroad Company built its line up through the forest on the east side of the six-mile square that would become Chelsea. To finance this undertaking, the railroad was granted half the land for 18 miles on either side of the track laid - generally the odd sections. The railroad built two stations in this town: Whittlesey and Chelsea. Sawmills were built near each station and logging commenced.

When Taylor County was formed in 1875, Chelsea was six miles north to south, but it spanned the full width of the county, including all modern towns from Pershing to Greenwood. An 1880 map shows some sort of road roughly following the course of modern highway 13 up to Chelsea station, then heading west along the course of modern Quarter Lane.

The 1911 plat map of the six mile square that would become Chelsea shows much of the same as 1880, but the road/track along Quarter Lane had disappeared. By then the whole east and south edges of the town had a fairly complete grid of roads and dirt tracks. In addition, that same area was starting to fill in with settlers holding parcels 40 acres and up. Outside that band on the east and south, roads are sparse and much of the land is in larger chunks, with Medford Mfg. Co, Wisconsin Central Railway, and M.H. Mould the largest holders. The map shows a sawmill at Chelsea and a brickyard south of Whittlesey.

That Langenberg brickyard dug clay onsite from a layer ten to twelve feet thick, and formed and fired bricks in "permanent up draft kilns." The brickyard produced 200,000 bricks in 1898, the year it opened. A writer from the Wisconsin Geological Survey observed, "This is one of the best common clays that has come under my observation."

In 1933 much of the northwest quarter of Chelsea was designated part of the Chequamegon National Forest

As logging operations declined, the railroad continued hauling freight and passengers, but that business too eventually dwindled and in 1988 the trains stopped running on this stretch of railroad. The following year, local residents and the railroad agreed to allow use of the railroad bed as a multi-use recreational trail - the Pine Line - which now runs along the east side of Chelsea.

== Demographics ==
=== 2010 census ===
As of the census of 2010, there were 113 people, 43 households, and 31 families living in the CDP. The population density was 245.7 inhabitants per square mile (94.9/km^{2}). There were 51 housing units at an average density of 110.9 per square mile (42.8/km^{2}). The racial makeup of the CDP was 99.1% White and 0.9% from other races. Hispanic or Latino of any race were 0.9% of the population.

There were 43 households, out of which 23.3% had children under the age of 18 living with them, 53.5% were married couples living together, 9.3% had a female householder with no husband present, 9.3% had a male householder with no wife present, and 27.9% were non-families. 18.6% of all households were made up of individuals, and 4.7% had someone living alone who was 65 years of age or older. The average household size was 2.63 and the average family size was 2.94.

The median age in the CDP was 37.8 years. 23.9% of residents were under the age of 18; 11.5% were between the ages of 18 and 24; 20.4% were from 25 to 44; 27.5% were from 45 to 64; and 16.8% were 65 years of age or older. The gender makeup of the CDP was 44.2% male and 55.8% female.

=== 2000 census ===
As of the census of 2000, there were 719 people, 274 households, and 201 families living in the town. The population density was 17.8 people per square mile (6.9/km^{2}). There were 310 housing units at an average density of 7.7 per square mile (3.0/km^{2}). The racial makeup of the town was 99.58% White, 0.14% Asian, and 0.28% from two or more races. Hispanic or Latino of any race were 0.42% of the population.

There were 274 households, out of which 34.7% had children under the age of 18 living with them, 59.5% were married couples living together, 7.3% had a female householder with no husband present, and 26.6% were non-families. 21.9% of all households were made up of individuals, and 7.7% had someone living alone who was 65 years of age or older. The average household size was 2.62 and the average family size was 3.10.

In the town, the population was spread out, with 26.3% under the age of 18, 8.2% from 18 to 24, 30.6% from 25 to 44, 22.3% from 45 to 64, and 12.7% who were 65 years of age or older. The median age was 38 years. For every 100 females, there were 95.9 males. For every 100 females age 18 and over, there were 103.1 males.

The median income for a household in the town was $44,659, and the median income for a family was $50,000. Males had a median income of $32,500 versus $26,429 for females. The per capita income for the town was $19,798. About 0.9% of families and 3.5% of the population were below the poverty line, including 2.2% of those under age 18 and 2.2% of those age 65 or over.

== Notable people ==
- Joseph Schmittfranz, Wisconsin State Representative, was born in the town
