= Big Flats Airport, New York =

Big Flats, New York
- Community
- Location within the state of New York
- Coordinates: 42°9′48″N 76°52′47″W
- Country: United States
- State: New York
- County: Chemung

Area
  - Total: 11.7 sq mi (30.4 km^{2})
  - Land: 11.7 sq mi (30.3 km^{2})
  - Water: 0.039 sq mi (0.1 km^{2})

Population (2000)
  - Total: 2,184
  - Density: 190/sq mi (72/km^{2})
- Time zone: UTC-5 (Eastern (EST))
  - Summer (DST): UTC-4 (EDT)
- FIPS code: 36-06480

Big Flats is a community (and former census-designated place, which is now part of Big Flats CDP as of the 2010 census) located in the Town of Big Flats in Chemung County, New York, United States. As of the 2018 census, the location had a total population of 7,595.

Big Flats is the location of the Elmira-Corning Regional Airport (ELM). It is part of the Elmira, New York Metropolitan Statistical Area.

== Geography ==
Big Flats is located at 42°9'48" North, 76°52'47" West (42.163424, -76.879714).

According to the United States Census Bureau, the location has a total area of 11.8 square miles (31 km^{2}), of which, 11.7 square miles (30 km^{2}) is land and 0.04 square miles (0.10 km^{2}) is water. The total area is 0.34% water.

New York State Route 17 (Southern Tier Expressway) is an east–west highway crossing the area. In 2004, NYS RT17 started the process of being updated to an interstate highway, which is nearly complete. Construction on the update began December 3, 1999, now with 222.3 miles completed. Most areas now refer to it as I-86.

New York State Route 352 passes through the community of Big Flats.

The Chemung River is south of the area.

== See also ==
- Big Flats (CDP), New York
