= Big Flats, Wisconsin =

- Town
- Location in Adams County and the state of Wisconsin.

- Location within Wisconsin Location within the United States
- Coordinates: 44°6′26″N 89°47′57″W
- Country: United States
- State: Wisconsin
- County: Adams

Government
  - Type: Town Board

Area
  - Total: 48.1 sq mi (124.5 km^{2})
  - Land: 47.9 sq mi (124.1 km^{2})
  - Water: 0.15 sq mi (0.4 km^{2})
- Elevation: 1,001 ft (305 m)

Population (2020)
  - Total: 948
  - Density: 20/sq mi (7.6/km^{2})
- Time zone: UTC-6 (Central (CST))
  - Summer (DST): UTC-5 (CDT)
- ZIP Code: 54613
- Area code: 608
- FIPS code: 55-07300
- GNIS feature ID: 1582809
- Website: bigflatswi.com

Big Flats is a town in Adams County in the U.S. state of Wisconsin. The population was 948 at the 2020 census.

The unincorporated community of Big Flats is located in the town. Big Flats is located at the junction of Wisconsin Highway 13 and County Highway C 10 miles (16 km) north of Friendship.

== History ==
The town of Big Flats was created on November 15, 1861, and the name was changed from Brownsville. The community of Big Flats once had a post office, which opened in August 1862; John W. Potter was the first postmaster. The community most likely takes its name from Big Flats, New York.

=== Big Flats tornado ===
On August 27, 1994, the town of Big Flats was hit by an F3 tornado. It touched down at 8:41 P.M. CDT and was on the ground for 16 minutes. The tornado's path was 10.5 miles (16.9 km) long and 850 yards (780 m) wide. The tornado killed two people and injured 22. It destroyed 24 homes, caused major damage to 8, and light to moderate damage to 160. It destroyed the Big Flats Fire Department, the Town Hall, and a thrift store. Seventy cows were crushed when a barn roof and an upper floor containing 16,000 bales of hay collapsed. The tornado caused $1 million in damage.

=== Cottonville Forest Fire ===
Big Flats was the site of a devastating wildfire, the Cottonville Forest Fire, on May 5, 2005. It started when a man lit a fire within a fire ring constructed of concrete blocks, attempting to burn off dead grass. The fire jumped out of the ring and began burning the grass in the surrounding area. Smoke from the fire was spotted by the fire tower in Rome's Dyracuse Park.

The fire spread in a north-northeast direction, along Roche A Cri Creek. Smoke from the fire was visible from 60 miles (97 km) away. About 177 firefighters from 20 fire departments responded. Wisconsin Department of Natural Resources (DNR) firefighters came from as far away as Hayward. Two DNR planes used to drop foam flew in from Minnesota. By the time it was contained 11 hours later, the flames had spread northward about 10 miles (16 km). It burned approximately 3,410 acres (13.8 km^{2}), destroying 30 residences. Approximately 60 other out-buildings were also destroyed.

It was the biggest forest fire in Wisconsin since the Ekdall Church and Oak Lake Fires burned more than 16,000 acres (65 km^{2}) in Washburn and Burnett counties April 21–22, 1980.

Thomas Barnhart was charged with setting a fire which became a forest fire, a misdemeanor. He pleaded no contest and was sentenced to a local jail term of 90 days, which was stayed, with two years of probation, 100 hours of community service, and $150 per month of restitution which is applied to uninsured expenses of the victims. On November 13, 2006, the total amount of restitution owed was set at $1,436,504.

== Geography ==
According to the United States Census Bureau, the town has a total area of 48.1 square miles (124.5 km^{2}), of which 47.9 square miles (124.1 km^{2}) is land and 0.15 square miles (0.4 km^{2}), or 0.34%, is water.

== Demographics ==
Historical population
Census	Pop.	Note	%±
1870	89		—
1880	158		77.5%
1890	322		103.8%
1900	550		70.8%
1910	386		−29.8%
1920	296		−23.3%
1930	255		−13.9%
1940	328		28.6%
1950	296		−9.8%
1960	246		−16.9%
1970	482		95.9%
1980	694		44.0%
1990	731		5.3%
2000	946		29.4%
2010	1,018		7.6%
2020	948		−6.9%
U.S. Decennial Census

As of the census of 2000, there were 946 people, 402 households, and 270 families residing in the town. The population density was 19.7 people per square mile (7.6/km^{2}). There were 797 housing units at an average density of 16.6 per square mile (6.4/km^{2}). The racial makeup of the town was 97.36% White, 0.53% African American, 0.63% Native American, 0.53% from other races, and 0.95% from two or more races. Hispanic or Latino of any race were 2.11% of the population.

There were 402 households, out of which 20.6% had children under the age of 18 living with them, 56.5% were married couples living together, 6.0% had a female householder with no husband present, and 32.6% were non-families. 25.4% of all households were made up of individuals, and 11.4% had someone living alone who was 65 years of age or older. The average household size was 2.35 and the average family size was 2.77.

In the town, the population was spread out, with 21.5% under the age of 18, 5.3% from 18 to 24, 23.2% from 25 to 44, 29.7% from 45 to 64, and 20.4% who were 65 years of age or older. The median age was 45 years. For every 100 females, there were 109.3 males. For every 100 females age 18 and over, there were 111.1 males.

The median income for a household in the town was $27,800, and the median income for a family was $36,250. Males had a median income of $31,583 versus $21,806 for females. The per capita income for the town was $14,629. About 6.9% of families and 13.1% of the population were below the poverty line, including 16.6% of those under age 18 and 5.5% of those age 65 or over.

== Education ==
It is in the Adams-Friendship Area School District.
