= Spirit (community), Wisconsin =

Spirit, Wisconsin
- Unincorporated community
- Location within Wisconsin Location within the United States
- Coordinates: 45°27′15″N 90°06′52″W
- Country: United States
- State: Wisconsin
- County: Price
- Elevation: 1,683 ft (513 m)
- Time zone: UTC-6 (Central (CST))
  - Summer (DST): UTC-5 (CDT)
- Area codes: 715 & 534
- GNIS feature ID: 1574553

Spirit is an unincorporated community located in the town of Spirit, Price County, Wisconsin, United States. Spirit is located at the junction of highways 86 and 102, 10.5 miles (16.9 km) southeast of Prentice.

According to tradition, Spirit was named from the simultaneous sighting of several ghosts at a nearby lake.
