= Pine Line Trail =

Rail trail in Wisconsin, United States

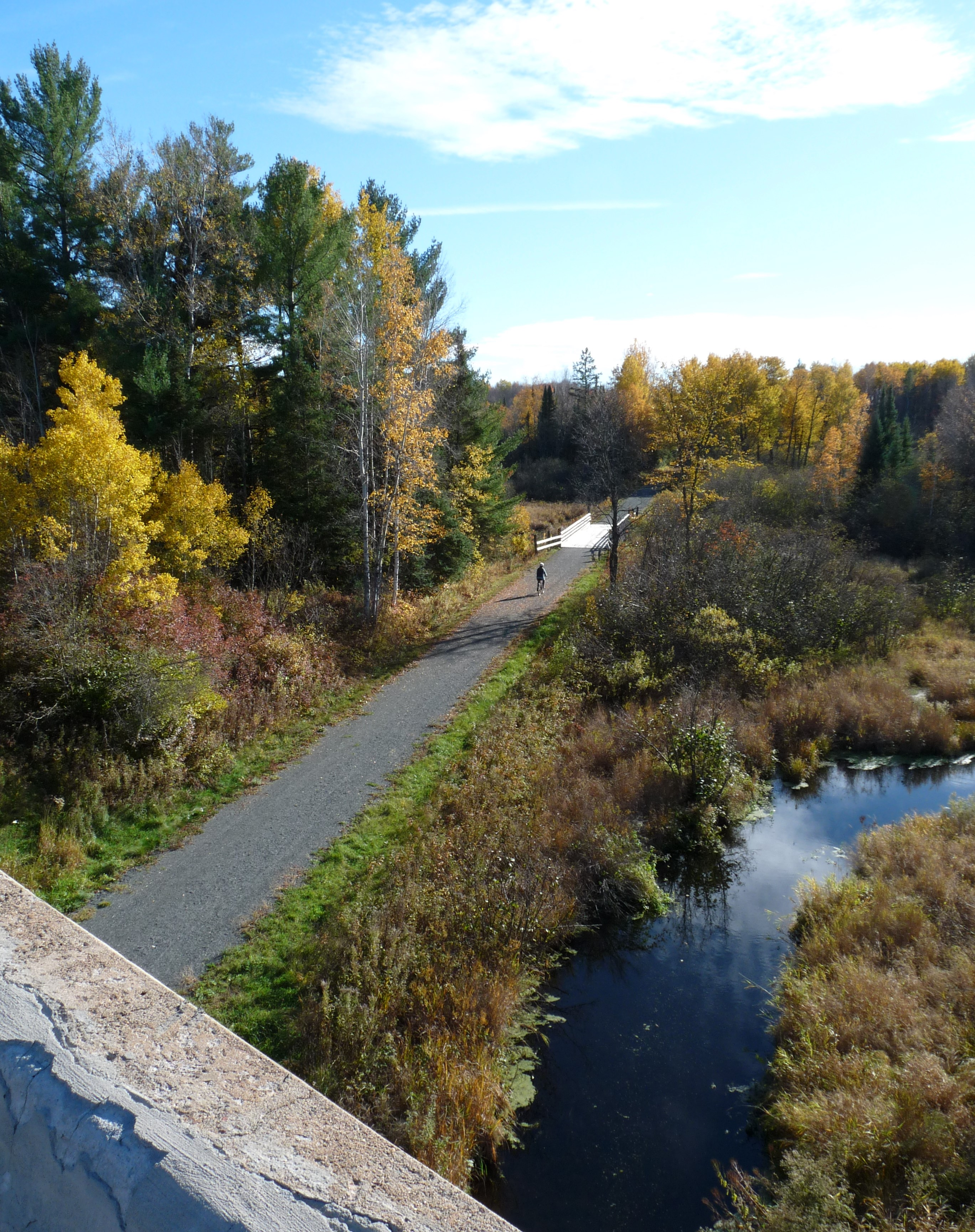
- Heading south from Westboro along Fisher Creek
- Length: 26.2 miles
- Location: Taylor County and Price County, Wisconsin
- Designation: Rail-trail
- Trailheads: W. Allman St. and River Dr. (Medford) and Morner Road between SR 13 and Prentice Road (Prentice)
- Use: Biking (including mountain biking), hiking, horseback riding, snowmobiling, and winter ATV
- Sights: Pines
- Website: Trail brochure

The Pine Line Trail, also known as Price-Taylor Rail Trail, is a multi-use rail-trail in Taylor and Price Counties in north-central Wisconsin. It is 26.2 miles long, running from farm country around Medford on the south end across the terminal moraine left by the last glacier in the area, passing hills, lakes and swamps, almost reaching Prentice.

== History ==
Starting in 1876 the site of the trail was a rail line used by the Wisconsin Central Railroad to ship eastern white pine, among other commodities. After the original timber was logged, the railroad continued to haul passengers and supplies to and from the little towns along its route. But with the proliferation of cars and trucks, even that business dwindled, and in 1988 the trains stopped running on this stretch. The following year, some local residents negotiated an agreement with the railroad to use the right-of-way and road bed as a multi-use recreational trail - the Pine Line. In the hundred years since logging started, pines have regrown to line the trail, accounting for the trail's name.

== Description ==
The trail is 26.2 miles (42.2 km) long and generally follows a north–south path along WIS 13. The trail's southern terminus is at Medford, Wisconsin in Taylor County (45°08′56″N 90°21′11″W), with the trailhead south of Prentice, Wisconsin in Price County (45°30′34″N 90°17′50″W). Along the way it passes the hamlets of Whittlesey, Chelsea, Westboro, and Ogema.

The Pine Line is open for non-motorized use such as bicycling, hiking, and jogging from April 1 through November 30. Snowmobiles and ATVs are allowed on the trail from December 1 through March 31. There are no fees for use.

Annual events are scheduled on the trail such as the Dairyland Marathon and Volksmarsch, which is held on the fourth Saturday of April.

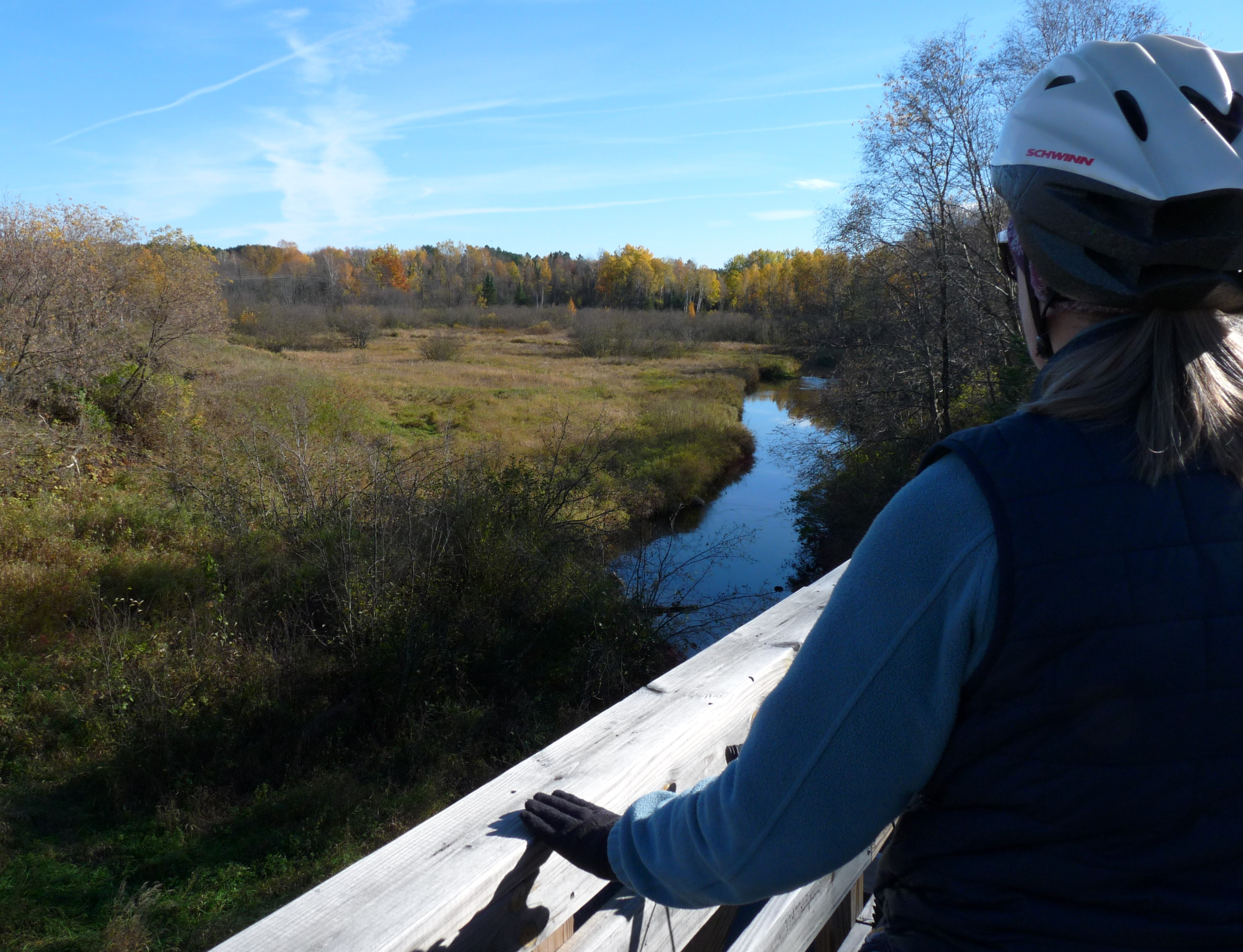
South side of Westboro, looking out on Fisher Creek

== See also ==
- Ice Age Trail
- List of hiking trails in Wisconsin
- List of rail trails
- Outdoor recreation
