= Chelsea (CDP), Wisconsin =

Census-designated place in Wisconsin, United States

Chelsea, Wisconsin
- Census-designated place
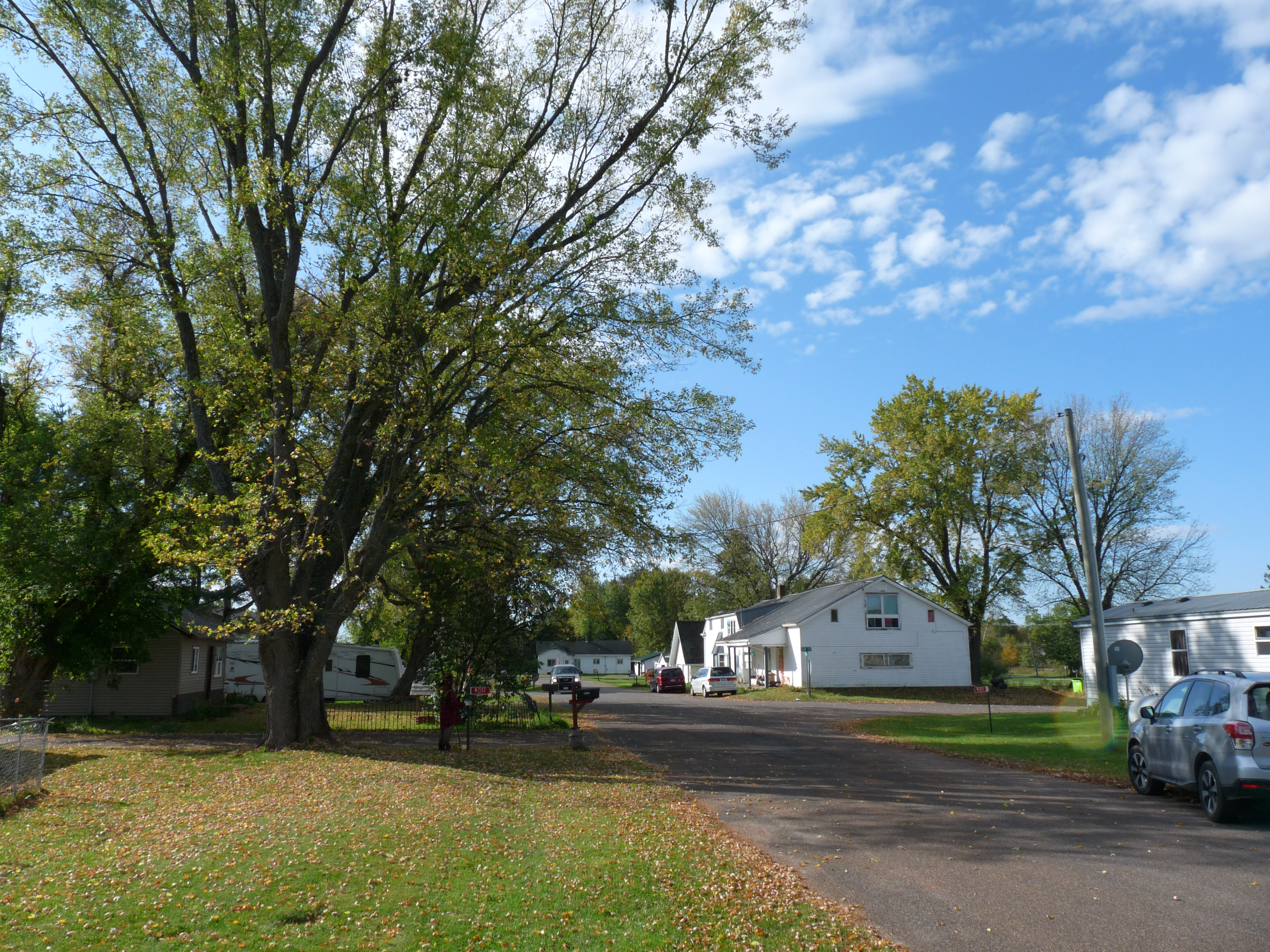
- typical scene

- Location within Wisconsin
- Coordinates: 45°17′25″N 90°18′27″W
- Country: United States
- State: Wisconsin
- County: Taylor

Area
  - Total: 0.463 sq mi (1.20 km^{2})
  - Land: 0.463 sq mi (1.20 km^{2})
  - Water: 0 sq mi (0 km^{2})
- Elevation: 1,529 ft (466 m)

Population (2020)
  - Total: 106
  - Density: 229/sq mi (88.4/km^{2})
- Time zone: UTC-6 (Central (CST))
  - Summer (DST): UTC-5 (CDT)
- Area codes: 715 & 534
- GNIS feature ID: 1578983

Chelsea is an unincorporated census-designated place located in the town of Chelsea, Taylor County, Wisconsin, United States. Chelsea is 5 miles (8.0 km) west-southwest of Rib Lake. As of the 2010 census, its population was 113.

It was the Wisconsin Central Railroad Company that started the settlement of Chelsea. In the early 1870s the railroad cut a line up through the forest, heading for Ashland, establishing a station every five to ten miles. The first station north of Medford was Whittlesey, and the second was Chelsea, six miles beyond. The railroad named the station after Chelsea, Massachusetts, since many investors in the Wisconsin Central were from Boston. The railroad built a depot and a pumping station to refill their steam engines with water.

The railroad platted the Village of Chelsea in 1874. Chelsea's first school was built in 1875 - a one-room frame building. The following year it had eleven students enrolled. Much of the town burned in 1876, along with the sawmill, but they rebuilt. In 1883 the Wisconsin Central built a rail spur from the north side of Chelsea to Rib Lake, mainly to help the Rib Lake Lumber Company get its sawn products out to markets. This spur hauled lumber and other products from Rib Lake through Chelsea for decades. Chelsea's one-room school was replaced by a two-room school in 1884.

By 1888 four trains rumbled north through the little town each day: a morning mail train, an afternoon passenger train, a slow freight train that stopped at every station in the evening, and a faster freight train later in the evening.

The 1913 plat map of Chelsea shows a post office and hotel across the tracks from the depot, with the school on the west side. It also shows three additional plats beyond the original. A 1911 map of the country around shows settlers holding a lot of the land within a mile or two of the railroad. Beyond that, most of the land is owned by various lumber companies and the railroad - unsettled. The transition from logging to farming was under way.

As local timber supplies waned, the sawmills adapted, shifting from white pine to hemlock and hardwoods. The big mill in Chelsea finally closed in 1918. The big sawmill in Rib Lake ran until 1948, then closed, and the spur to Rib Lake was pulled up within a few years. Cars and trucks took over for trains, but the traffic through town slowed when Highway 13 was routed around Chelsea on the east side. The rail line closed in 1988.

As of 2023 Chelsea is a smattering of homes on a side-road a short drive north of Medford - usually quiet - with the Pine Line bike trail passing through on the old railroad corridor.
