= Ogema (CDP), Wisconsin =

Census-designated place in Wisconsin, United States

Ogema, Wisconsin
- Census-designated place
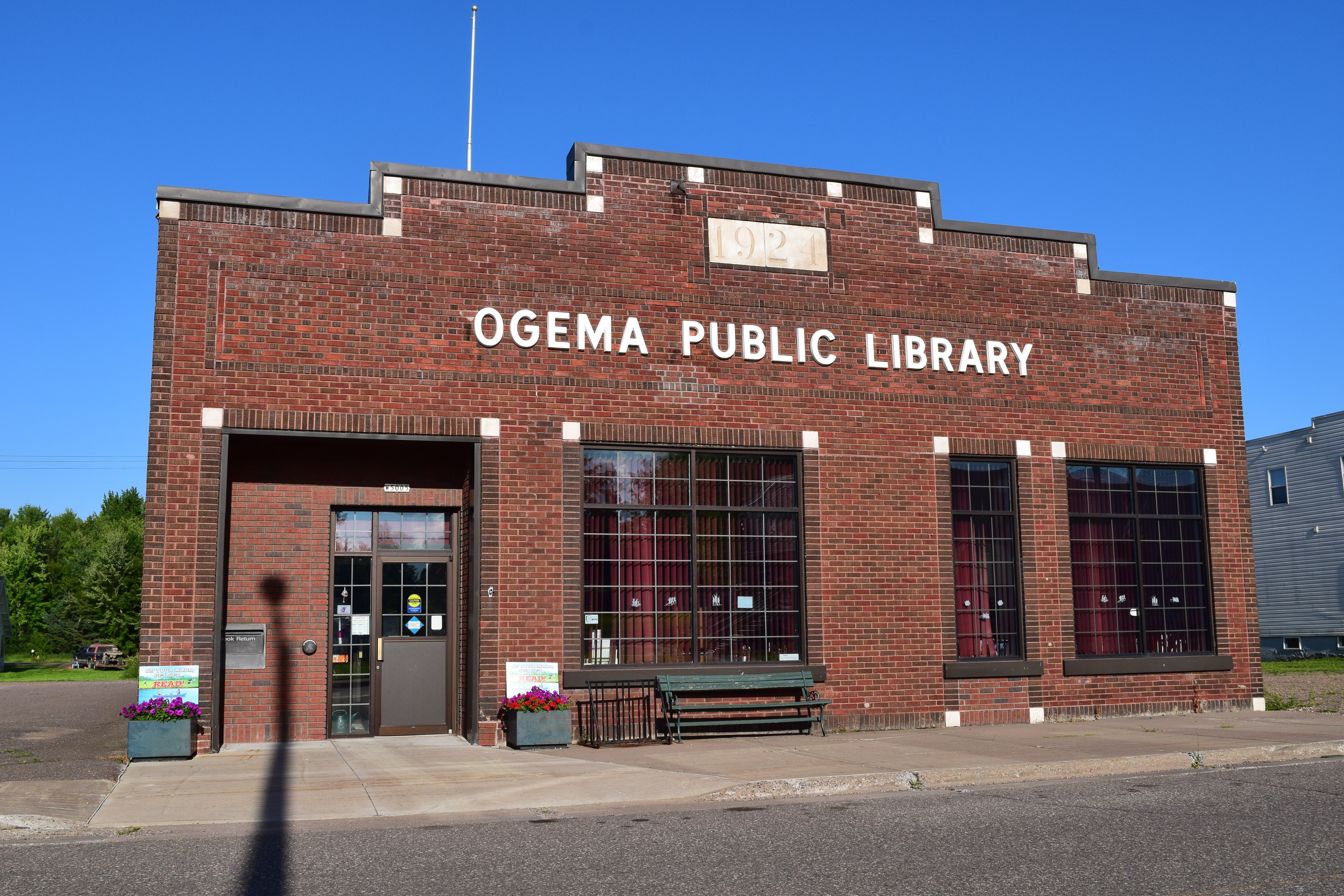
- Ogema Public Library

- Location within Wisconsin
- Coordinates: 45°26′37″N 90°17′54″W
- Country: United States
- State: Wisconsin
- County: Price

Area
  - Total: 3.064 sq mi (7.94 km^{2})
  - Land: 3.039 sq mi (7.87 km^{2})
  - Water: 0.025 sq mi (0.065 km^{2})
- Elevation: 1,585 ft (483 m)

Population (2020)
  - Total: 188
  - Density: 61.9/sq mi (23.9/km^{2})
- Time zone: UTC-6 (Central (CST))
  - Summer (DST): UTC-5 (CDT)
- ZIP code: 54459
- Area codes: 715 & 534
- GNIS feature ID: 1580050

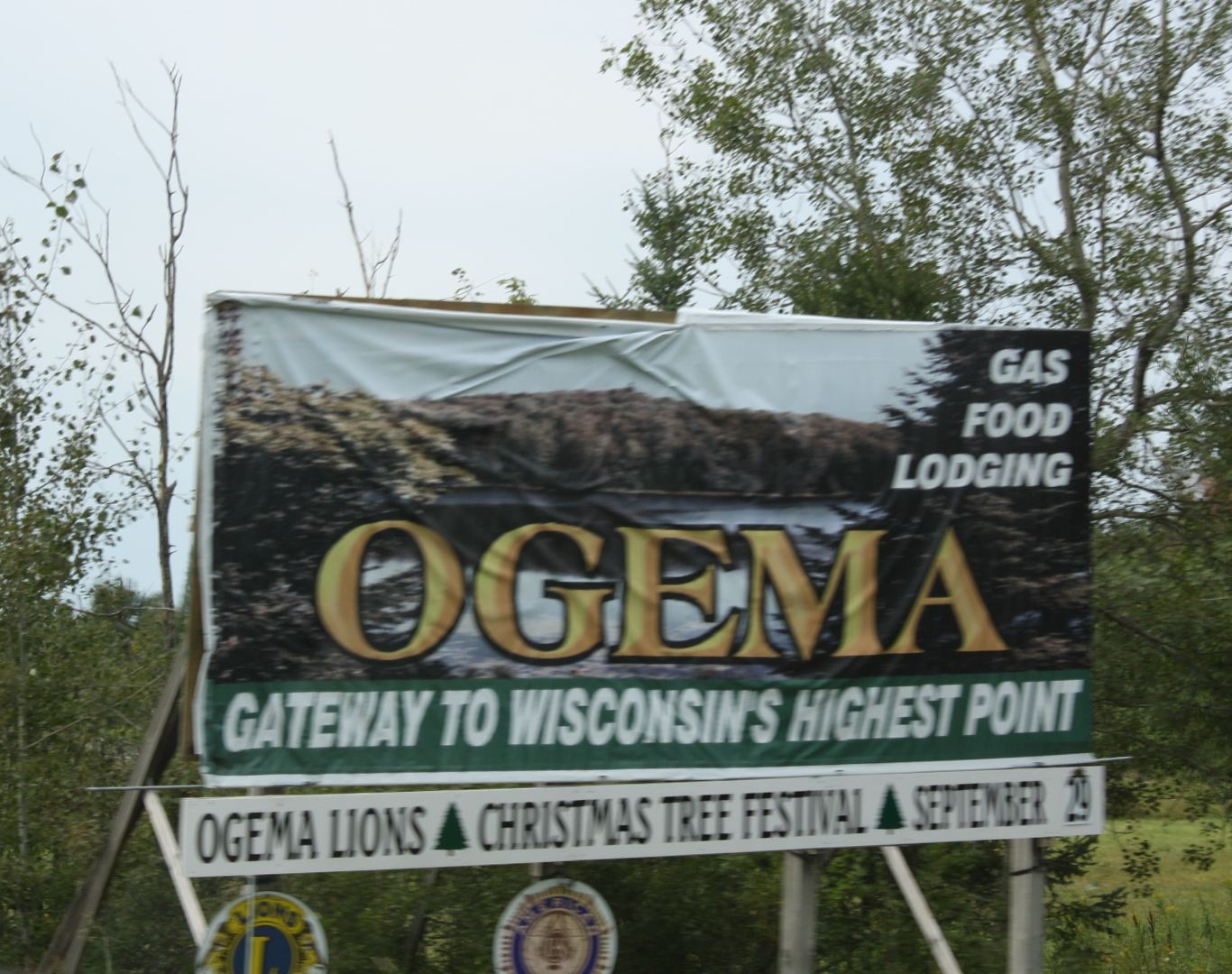
Sign on WIS13

Ogema is an unincorporated census-designated place located in the town of Ogema, Price County, Wisconsin, United States. Ogema is located on Wisconsin Highway 86 near its junction with Wisconsin Highway 13, 7 miles (11 km) south of Prentice. Ogema has a post office with ZIP code 54459. As of the 2020 census, its population is 188.

== History ==
After the last glacier backed out of northern Wisconsin 10,000 or 15,000 years ago a vast forest developed across much of the area, with hemlock the most common species in the locale that would become Ogema. By 1800, the area was dominated by Ojibwe people, but they were forced by the U.S. in the 1837 White Pine Treaty to cede many of their rights to northern Wisconsin.

White settlement began in the 1870s when the Wisconsin Central Railroad built its rail line up through what would become Ogema, heading for Lake Superior. Dennis McGuire was the first settler, engaged by the railroad in 1872 to run a boarding camp for its workers near where the right of way crossed a stream that flows into the Jump River. (This was also the first settlement in all of what would become Price County.) The stop was initially called "Station 89" (since it was 89 miles from Stevens Point), then "Dedham" for the town near the railroad's financiers in Massachusetts. It was later renamed Ogema, an Ojibwe word meaning "chief." In 1873 the railroad laid tracks through the community and the second settler arrived - Ernest Martin. In 1874 more arrived and B.M. Holmes built a steam sawmill to cut lumber from the surrounding forest. He also built a lumber yard, a store, and a house.

Construction of the rail line to Ashland had paused in 1873 due to the railroad's finances. After the line was completed in 1877 and trains began to run, the community began growing faster. In 1878 the railroad platted the village of Ogema, two stores were started, and a schoolhouse was built. That year a group of Scandinavian immigrants arrived to start a Swedish colony east of Ogema, recruited by the Baptist Rev. K.A. Ostergren, who had been appointed for that purpose by the railroad.

A post office was established in 1879. Before that, incoming mail was thrown from the train and retrieved by Mr. McGuire, who distributed it from his boarding house. Outgoing letters were collected in a cigar box, then deposited on the train when it came through.

In 1880 nearly 100 families arrived and settled near Ogema, building roads and clearing land. A Baptist congregation was organized that year. A Lutheran congregation was organized the following year.

In 1888 Holmes added a steam planing mill to his operation and a high school was built. A two-room grade school was added in 1889. By 1890 the population of the town was estimated at 300 - mostly Swedish-speaking, with "only one family of an English-speaking nationality."

Natural disasters threatened the community: floods in 1884 and 1941; forest fires in 1890, 1894 and 1910; city fires in 1923 and 1927; and tornadoes in 1952 and 1972.

In the early 1900s timber was dwindling so some local businessmen built the Ogema Creamery, which provided a market for farmers in the surrounding country for a few years. A Dr. Pearson came to Ogema in 1905 and practiced there until 1917. The first car arrived in 1908, when the only place to buy gas in town was the drug store, at 50 cents a bottle.

One-room schoolhouses were opened in the surrounding country to educate farm children. With cars and buses to haul students, the last of these were closed in 1956, and schooling was consolidated into the new brick school building in town. That building was expanded in 1974 and 1975.

Railroad travel dwindled with the abundance of automobiles, and passenger service through Ogema ended in 1960. In 1988 the Wisconsin Central quit running trains altogether. The following year local residents negotiated an agreement to use the road-bed as a recreational trail - the Pine Line.

Historical population
Census	Pop.	Note	%±
2010	186		—
2020	188		1.1%
U.S. Decennial Census
