= Spirit, Wisconsin =

- Town
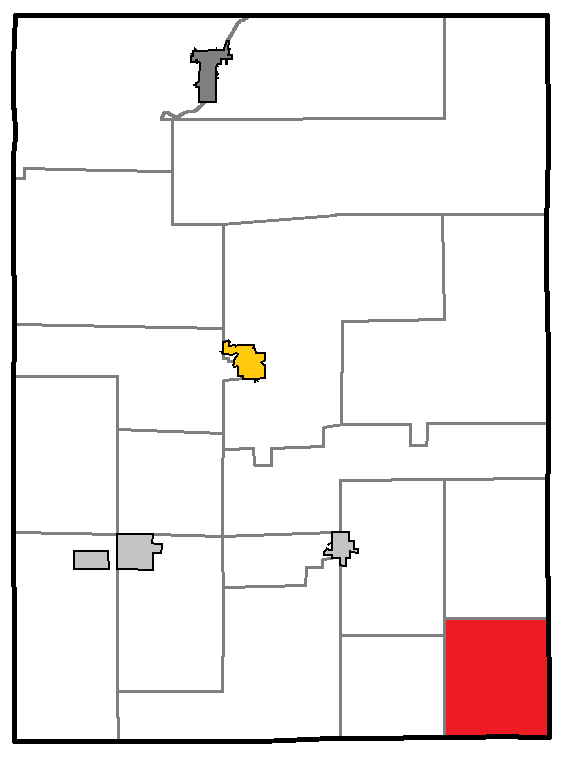
- Location of Spirit, within Price County
- Coordinates: 45°25′1″N 90°6′25″W
- Country: United States
- State: Wisconsin
- County: Price

Area
  - Total: 41.6 sq mi (107.7 km^{2})
  - Land: 41.1 sq mi (106.5 km^{2})
  - Water: 0.50 sq mi (1.3 km^{2})
- Elevation: 1,647 ft (502 m)

Population (2020)
  - Total: 292
  - Density: 7.10/sq mi (2.74/km^{2})
- Time zone: UTC-6 (Central (CST))
  - Summer (DST): UTC-5 (CDT)
- Area codes: 715 & 534
- FIPS code: 55-75525
- GNIS feature ID: 1584186

Spirit is a town in Price County, Wisconsin, United States. The population was 292 at the 2020 census. The unincorporated community of Spirit is located in the town.

== Geography ==
According to the United States Census Bureau, the town has a total area of 41.6 square miles (107.7 km^{2}), of which 41.1 square miles (106.4 km^{2}) is land and 0.5 square miles (1.3 km^{2}) (1.20%) is water.

== Demographics ==
As of the census of 2000, there were 315 people, 133 households, and 90 families residing in the town. The population density was 7.7 people per square mile (3.0/km^{2}). There were 244 housing units at an average density of 5.9 per square mile (2.3/km^{2}). The racial makeup of the town was 98.41% White, 0.63% African American, 0.63% Native American, and 0.32% from two or more races.

There were 133 households, out of which 25.6% had children under the age of 18 living with them, 61.7% were married couples living together, 3.8% had a female householder with no husband present, and 31.6% were non-families. 26.3% of all households were made up of individuals, and 10.5% had someone living alone who was 65 years of age or older. The average household size was 2.37 and the average family size was 2.88.

In the town, the population was spread out, with 21.0% under the age of 18, 6.0% from 18 to 24, 25.1% from 25 to 44, 33.7% from 45 to 64, and 14.3% who were 65 years of age or older. The median age was 44 years. For every 100 females, there were 112.8 males. For every 100 females age 18 and over, there were 105.8 males.

The median income for a household in the town was $30,114, and the median income for a family was $31,667. Males had a median income of $25,000 versus $26,875 for females. The per capita income for the town was $12,722. About 15.2% of families and 17.2% of the population were below the poverty line, including 24.2% of those under age 18 and 4.4% of those age 65 or over.
