= Rib Lake, Wisconsin =

- Village

- Location of Rib Lake in Taylor County, Wisconsin.

- Location within the state of Wisconsin
- Coordinates: 45°18′52″N 90°11′53″W
- Country: United States
- State: Wisconsin
- County: Taylor

Area
  - Total: 2.21 sq mi (5.72 km^{2})
  - Land: 1.74 sq mi (4.51 km^{2})
  - Water: 0.46 sq mi (1.20 km^{2})
- Elevation: 1,581 ft (482 m)

Population (2020)
  - Total: 935
  - Density: 537/sq mi (207/km^{2})
- Time zone: UTC-6 (Central (CST))
  - Summer (DST): UTC-5 (CDT)
- ZIP Code: 54470
- Area codes: 715 & 534
- FIPS code: 55-67300
- GNIS ID: 1584017
- Website: riblakewisconsin.com

Rib Lake is a village in Taylor County, Wisconsin, United States located at the junction of Wisconsin Highway 102 and Taylor County Highway D. The population was 935 at the 2020 census. The village is completely surrounded by the Town of Rib Lake.

== History ==
In 1881, J. J. Kennedy hauled sawmill machinery with oxen from the railroad at Chelsea to the bank of Rib Lake and built a sawmill called the Rib Lake Lumber Company. The next year a railroad spur was built to the mill from the Wisconsin Central Railway at Chelsea. The community was originally called Kennedy Mills. The original mill burned in about a year, (and possibly burned again in 1898) and was destroyed by another fire on July 23, 1914.

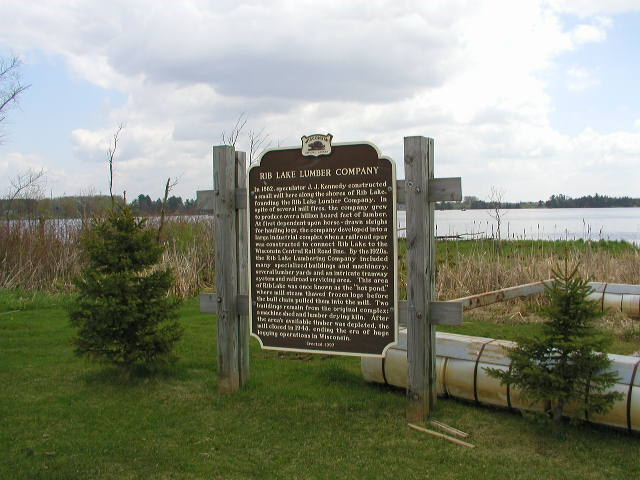
Historic marker at public boat landing

In 1891, Fayette Shaw started a tannery in Rib Lake, which used tannic acid from locally harvested hemlock bark to tan hides from as far away as South America to make leather. The tannery operated until 1923.

The 1890s saw much growth, with the beginning of Methodist, Catholic and Lutheran congregations. In 1897 the Rib Lake Herald newspaper began publishing and a Dr. Werner started a practice.

The village of Rib Lake was incorporated in 1902.

The last pine cut for the Rib Lake Lumber Company came from a general location near the last camp #28, and was cut on February 26, 1948. The company ceased operations shortly thereafter.

== Geography ==
According to the United States Census Bureau, the village has a total area of 2.34 square miles (6.06 km^{2}), of which 1.87 square miles (4.84 km^{2}) is land and 0.47 square miles (1.22 km^{2}) is water.

== Demographics ==
Historical population
Census	Pop.	Note	%±
1910	1,018		—
1920	1,020		0.2%
1930	1,180		15.7%
1940	1,042		−11.7%
1950	853		−18.1%
1960	794		−6.9%
1970	782		−1.5%
1980	945		20.8%
1990	887		−6.1%
2000	878		−1.0%
2010	910		3.6%
2020	935		2.7%
U.S. Decennial Census

=== 2010 census ===
As of the census of 2010, there were 910 people, 371 households, and 220 families residing in the village. The population density was 486.6 inhabitants per square mile (187.9/km^{2}). There were 432 housing units at an average density of 231.0 per square mile (89.2/km^{2}). The racial makeup of the village was 98.7% White, 0.1% African American, 0.3% Native American, 0.2% Asian, and 0.7% from two or more races. Hispanic or Latino of any race were 1.0% of the population.

There were 371 households, of which 30.7% had children under the age of 18 living with them, 43.1% were married couples living together, 11.1% had a female householder with no husband present, 5.1% had a male householder with no wife present, and 40.7% were non-families. 32.9% of all households were made up of individuals, and 18.1% had someone living alone who was 65 years of age or older. The average household size was 2.33 and the average family size was 2.96.

The median age in the village was 39.7 years. 25.1% of residents were under the age of 18; 7.1% were between the ages of 18 and 24; 22.4% were from 25 to 44; 24.1% were from 45 to 64; and 21.3% were 65 years of age or older. The gender makeup of the village was 47.1% male and 52.9% female.

=== 2000 census ===
As of the census of 2000, there were 878 people, 356 households, and 206 families residing in the village. The population density was 470.5 people per square mile (181.3/km^{2}). There were 394 housing units at an average density of 211.2 per square mile (81.3/km^{2}). The racial makeup of the village was 98.86% White, 0.11% Black or African American, 0.23% Native American, 0.34% Asian, 0.23% from other races, and 0.23% from two or more races. 0.34% of the population were Hispanic or Latino of any race.

There were 356 households, out of which 27.0% had children under the age of 18 living with them, 44.7% were married couples living together, 9.6% had a female householder with no husband present, and 41.9% were non-families. 37.6% of all households were made up of individuals, and 24.7% had someone living alone who was 65 years of age or older. The average household size was 2.28 and the average family size was 3.02.

In the village, the population was spread out, with 22.9% under the age of 18, 8.1% from 18 to 24, 22.3% from 25 to 44, 21.9% from 45 to 64, and 24.8% who were 65 years of age or older. The median age was 41 years. For every 100 females, there were 86.8 males. For every 100 females age 18 and over, there were 82.0 males.

The median income for a household in the village was $32,222, and the median income for a family was $41,667. Males had a median income of $30,268 versus $18,750 for females. The per capita income for the village was $14,571. About 7.7% of families and 12.1% of the population were below the poverty line, including 15.4% of those under age 18 and 13.8% of those age 65 or over.

== Images ==
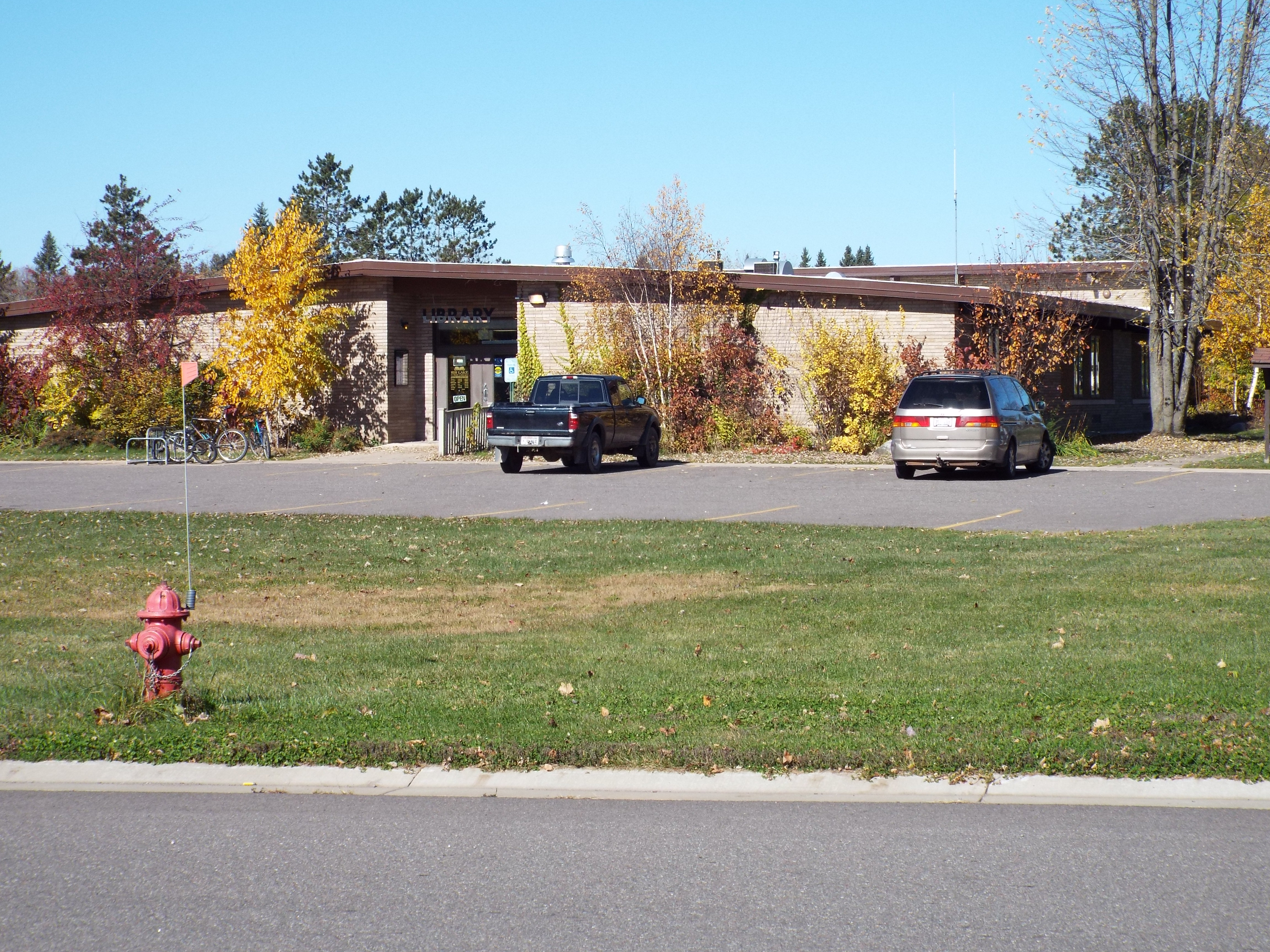
Public library

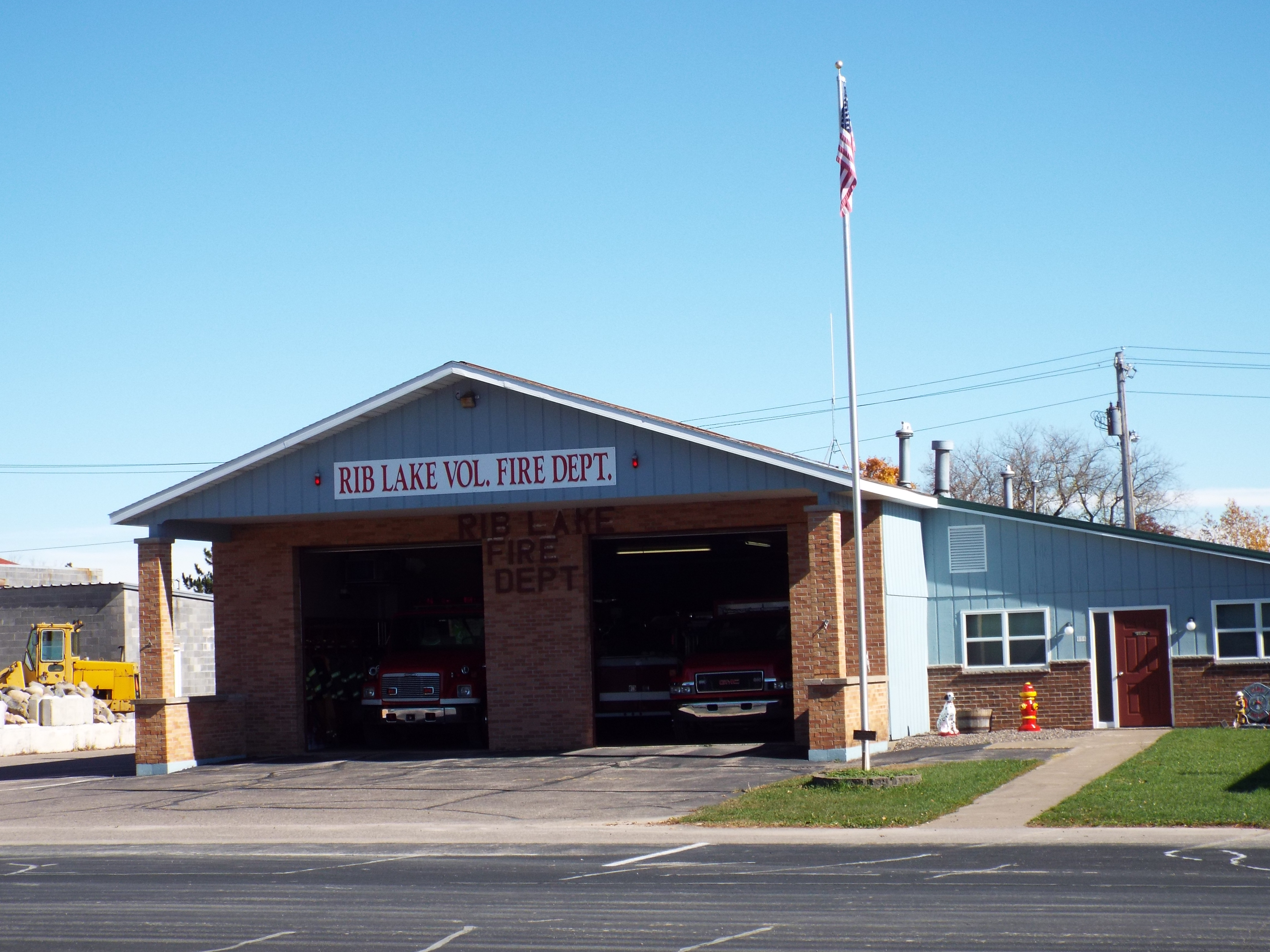
Fire station

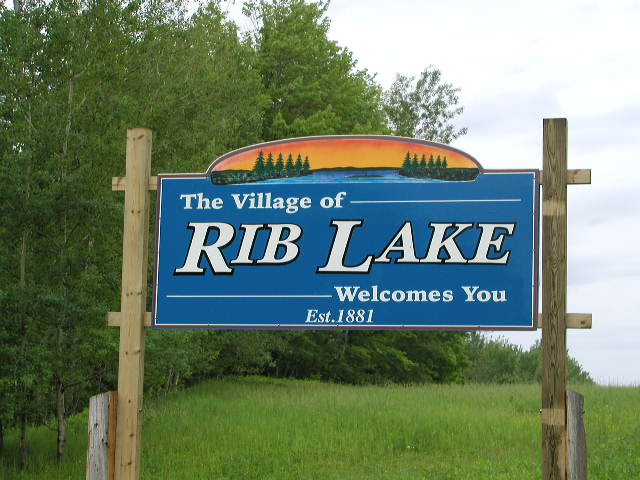
Welcome sign

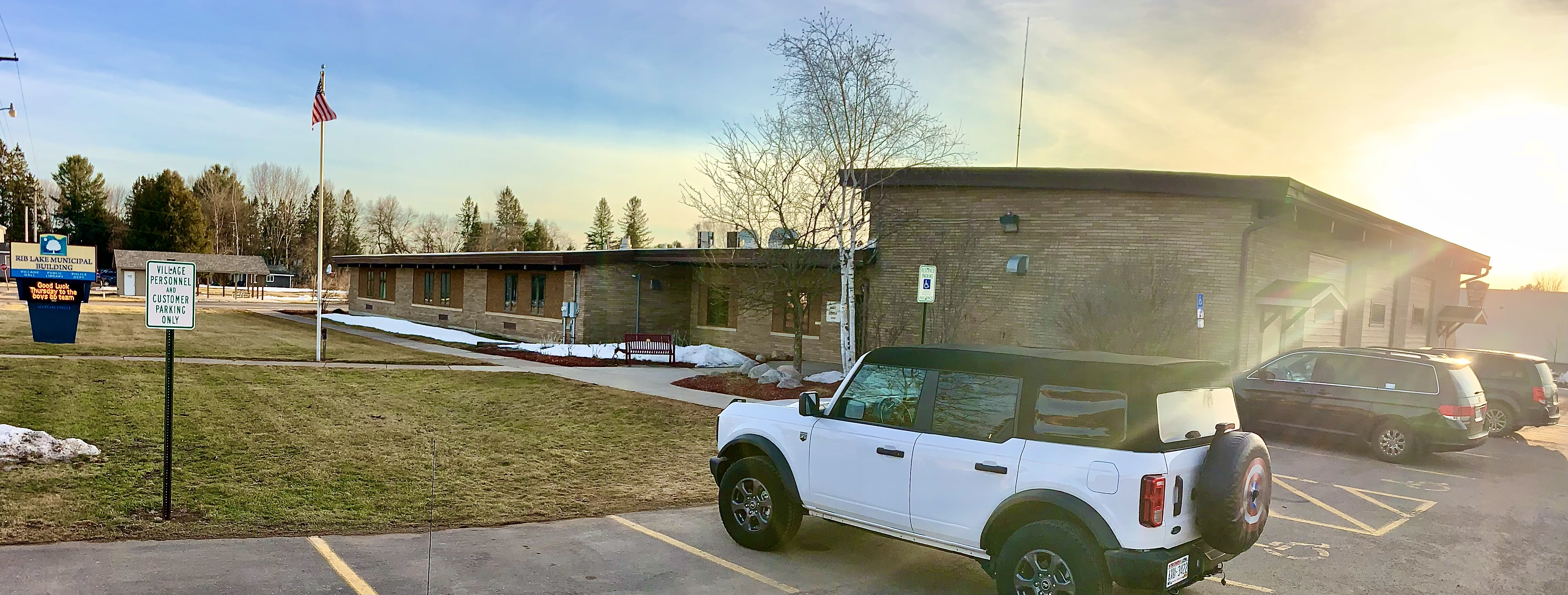
Village hall

== See also ==
- Big Rib River
- History of Wisconsin, Logging
- Ice Age Trail
