= Whittlesey, Wisconsin =

Census-designated place in Wisconsin, United States

- Census-designated place
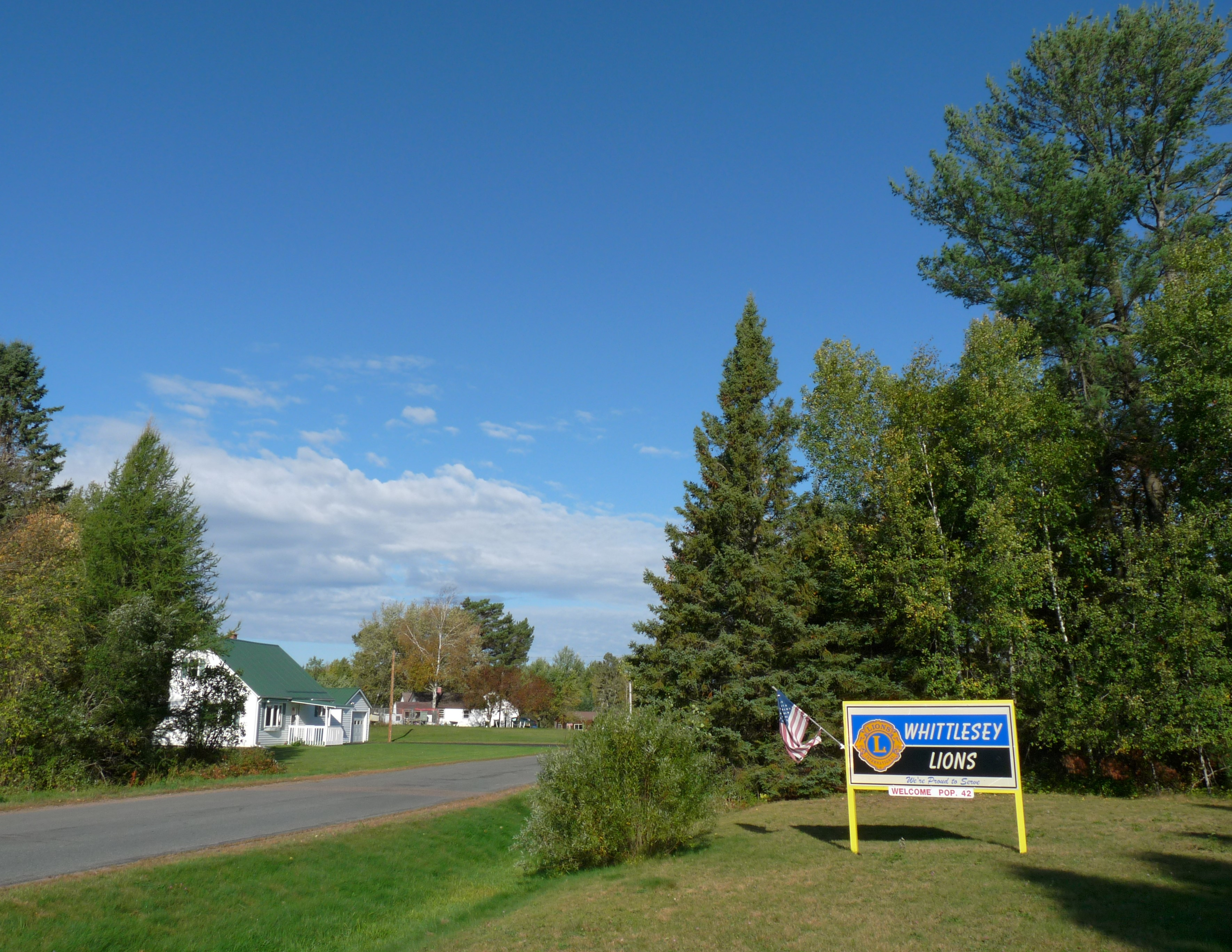

- Location within Wisconsin
- Coordinates: 45°13′23″N 90°19′44″W
- Country: United States
- State: Wisconsin
- County: Taylor

Area
  - Total: 1.127 sq mi (2.92 km^{2})
  - Land: 1.127 sq mi (2.92 km^{2})
  - Water: 0 sq mi (0 km^{2})
- Elevation: 1,476 ft (450 m)

Population (2020)
  - Total: 97
  - Density: 86/sq mi (33/km^{2})
- Time zone: UTC-6 (Central (CST))
  - Summer (DST): UTC-5 (CDT)
- Area codes: 715 & 534
- GNIS feature ID: 1576708

Whittlesey is a census-designated place in the town of Chelsea, Taylor County, Wisconsin, United States. As of the 2020 census, Whittlesey had a population of 97.

The community of Whittlesey was started in the 1870s when the Wisconsin Central Railroad Company built its line up through the forests, heading for Ashland. The railroad placed a station seven miles north of Medford where the line touched the Little Black River. It named the station Whittlesey, probably for Asaph Whittlesey, an early state legislator from Ashland, or possibly for geologist Charles Whittlesey who surveyed the area.

Several sawmills operated in Whittlesey starting in the 1880s. One built a 240-foot dam across the river, producing a 12-foot head of water. Another sawmill operated a mile and a half west of town, hauling its sawn product on carts over a pole line (a track of hardwood poles) to ship from the station at Whittlesey. A brickyard also operated there.

A Village of Whittlesey was platted in 1892, initiated by G.W. and Emma Norton. A 1913 map shows a "depot", post office, and blacksmith shop facing the railroad, with the school on the southeast side of town. But as the timber was exhausted, the nearby sawmills closed and declined. The highway bypassed most of the town to the east. The rail line closed in 1988.

As of 2023 Whittlesey is a quiet cluster of homes scattered among the trees a short drive north of Medford, with the Pine Line bike trail passing through on the old railroad right-of-way.
