= Wisconsin Highway 111 =

State highway in Wisconsin, United States

State Trunk Highway 111
- WIS 111 highlighted in red

Route information
- Maintained by WisDOT
- Length: 10.61 mi (17.08 km)

Major junctions
- South end: US 8 in Catawba
- North end: WIS 13 in Phillips

Location
- Country: United States
- State: Wisconsin
- Counties: Price

Highway system
- Wisconsin State Trunk Highway System; Interstate; US; State; Scenic; Rustic
← WIS 110	→ WIS 112

State Trunk Highway 111 (often called Highway 111, STH-111 or WIS 111) is a state highway in the U.S. state of Wisconsin. It runs from U.S. Route 8 (US 8) near Catawba north to Highway 13 south of Phillips. The highway is located entirely within Price County. Highway 111 is maintained by the Wisconsin Department of Transportation.

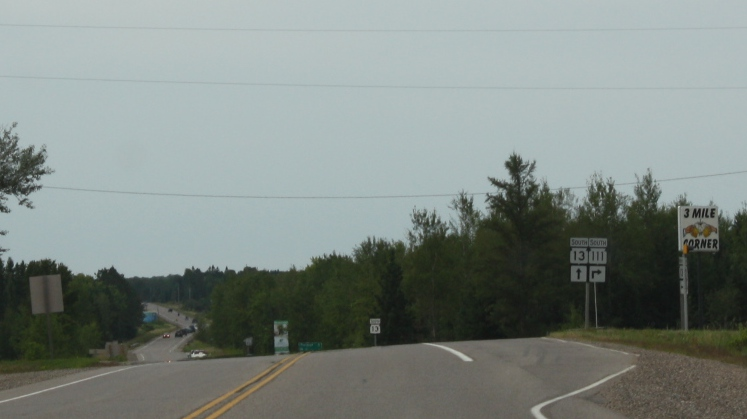
Northeast terminus from WIS13

== Route description ==
Highway 111 begins at a junction with US 8 in the Town of Catawba, east of the village of the same name. The highway heads north through a rural area, crossing into the Town of Harmony. It runs through a mixture of forest and farmland, passing to the east of Lake Sixteen. Past a junction with County Highway J, the highway curves to the northeast. After it intersects several local roads, the route turns west into the Town of Worcester and terminates at Highway 13. The road continues east as the unmarked Little Chicago Road.

== Major intersections ==
The entire route is in Price County.

Location	mi	km	Destinations	Notes
Town of Catawba	0.0	0.0	US 8 – Ladysmith, Prentice	
Town of Worcester	10.6	17.1	WIS 13 – Phillips, Prentice	
1.000 mi = 1.609 km; 1.000 km = 0.621 mi
