= U.S. Route 8 =

East-west U.S. Highway from Minnesota to Michigan

U.S. Route 8
- US 8 highlighted in red

Route information
- Maintained by MnDOT, WisDOT, MDOT
- Length: 280.00 mi (Note: Total mileage is a summation of the state mileages.) (450.62 km) 22.13 mi (35.61 km) in Minnesota, 255.55 mi (411.27 km) in Wisconsin, and 2.32 mi (3.73 km) in Michigan
- Existed: November 11, 1926–present

Major junctions
- West end: I-35 in Forest Lake, Minnesota
- US 61 in Forest Lake, Minnesota; US 63 at Turtle Lake, Wisconsin; US 53 near Cameron, Wisconsin; US 51 near Bradley, Wisconsin; US 45 in Monico, Wisconsin; US 141 near Pembine, Wisconsin
- East end: US 2 in Norway, Michigan

Location
- Country: United States
- States: Minnesota, Wisconsin, Michigan
- Counties: Minnesota: Washington, Chisago; Wisconsin: Polk, Barron, Rusk, Price, Lincoln, Oneida, Forest, Marinette; Michigan: Dickinson

Highway system
- United States Numbered Highway System; List; Special; Divided
- Minnesota Trunk Highway System; Interstate; US; State; Legislative; Scenic
- Wisconsin State Trunk Highway System; Interstate; US; State; Scenic; Rustic
- Michigan State Trunkline Highway System; Interstate; US; State; Byways
← US 7	US	→ US 9
← MN 7	Minnesota	→ MN 9
← US 2	Wisconsin	→ US 10
← M-7	Michigan	→ M-8

U.S. Highway 8 (US 8) is a United States Numbered Highway that runs primarily east–west for 280 miles (451 km), mostly within the state of Wisconsin. It connects Interstate 35 (I-35) in Forest Lake, Minnesota, to US 2 at Norway, Michigan. Except for the short freeway segment near Forest Lake, a section near the St. Croix River bridge, the interchange with US 51, and a three-mile (4.8 km) stretch west of Rhinelander, Wisconsin, it is mostly an undivided surface road. As a state highway in the three states, US 8 is maintained by the Minnesota, Wisconsin and Michigan departments of transportation (MnDOT, WisDOT, and MDOT, respectively).

The highway was originally commissioned on November 11, 1926, with the rest of the original U.S. Highway System. At the time, it ran between Forest Lake, Minnesota, and Pembine, Wisconsin, with a planned continuation to Powers, Michigan. Several changes have been made to the routing of the highway since then. The western end was extended south to Minneapolis before it was truncated back to Forest Lake. Other changes on the east end have moved that terminus from the originally planned end location at Powers to the current location in Norway. Internal WisDOT and MDOT map files at various times have shown plans to reroute the highway to connect to the original planned 1926 terminus. US 8's course through the three states has also been shifted to follow different alignments over the years.

WisDOT built a bypass around the city of Rhinelander in the 1990s and created a business loop along the old highway through the town. This loop was a locally maintained route through the central business district in Rhinelander. The signage for the loop was removed in 2005.

== Route description ==
=== Forest Lake to St. Croix Falls ===
US 8 begins at an interchange with I-35 in Forest Lake. This interchange is incomplete: traffic can only access US 8 directly from northbound I-35, and westbound traffic on US 8 merges onto southbound I-35. The first one-mile (1.6 km) segment of roadway to Forest Lake is a freeway, with an interchange at US 61. East of this junction, the highway follows Lake Boulevard North around Forest Lake and continues northeasterly through the community to cross the Washington–Chisago county line. The highway continues to the northeast along farmland and the shore of Green Lake to Chisago City, where it meets up with County State-Aid Highway 22 (CSAH 22). US 8 follows Lake Boulevard through Chisago City along the isthmus between the larger Chisago Lake and the smaller Wallmark Lake on the eastern side of town. The highway turns along a more easterly path in Lindström between North and South Lindström lakes. East of those lakes, US 8 crosses into the town of Center City.

In Center City, US 8 runs between North and South Center lakes, curving around the north shore of South Center Lake. On the eastern edge of town, it turns due east for several miles and runs through Shafer. US 8 merges with Minnesota State Highway 95 (MN 95) at a roundabout about two miles (3.2 km) southwest of Taylors Falls. The two highways concurrently turn northeast along the St. Croix River, entering town. At this point, MN 95 continues north along the river while US 8 turns east to cross the St. Croix River, exiting the state of Minnesota into Wisconsin.

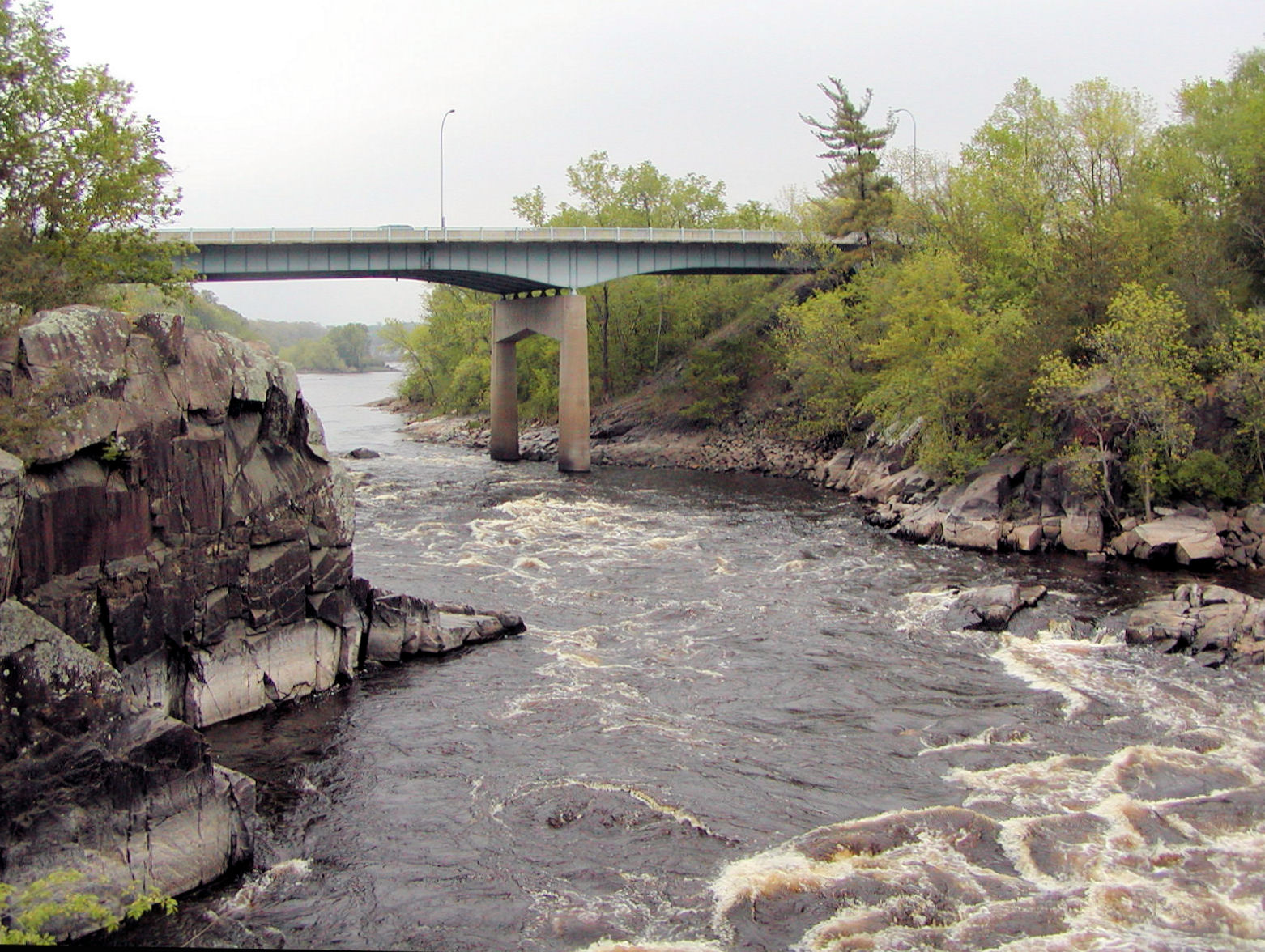
Bridge carrying US 8 across the St. Croix River

Legally, the Minnesota section of US 8 is defined as Constitutional Route 46 and Legislative Route 98 in the Minnesota Statutes §§161.114(2) and 161.115(29); the roadway is not marked with those numbers. The section of US 8 in Chisago County was officially designated the Moberg Trail in 1990.

=== St. Croix Falls to Rhinelander ===
US 8 enters Polk County at St. Croix Falls as a multilane roadway. It joins State Trunk Highway 35 (WIS 35) at a diamond interchange located approximately one mile (1.6 km) from the state line. The two highways run concurrently for four miles (6.4 km) before WIS 35 turns off to the north at a location in the Town of St. Croix Falls west of Deer Lake. US 8 continues eastward through forest lands, and WIS 46 joins from the north for a four-mile (6.4 km) concurrency before splitting off to the south. Continuing eastward, US 8 passes through Range and crosses into Barron County at Turtle Lake. US 63 merges from the south near Turtle Lake and departs to the north in the downtown area. The roadway passes through Poskin and intersects WIS 25 in Barron. East of Barron, US 8 meets US 53 at a mixed diamond/cloverleaf interchange and turns north into Cameron, then turns east in downtown to leave the latter community. After a nine-mile (14 km) straightaway, the highway crosses into Rusk County, and then it continues due east for an additional five miles (8.0 km) before turning northeast and passing through Weyerhaeuser. Continuing northeasterly, the roadway crosses WIS 40 in Bruce. East of town, the highway continues through rural Rusk County, and US 8 meets WIS 27 in downtown Ladysmith.

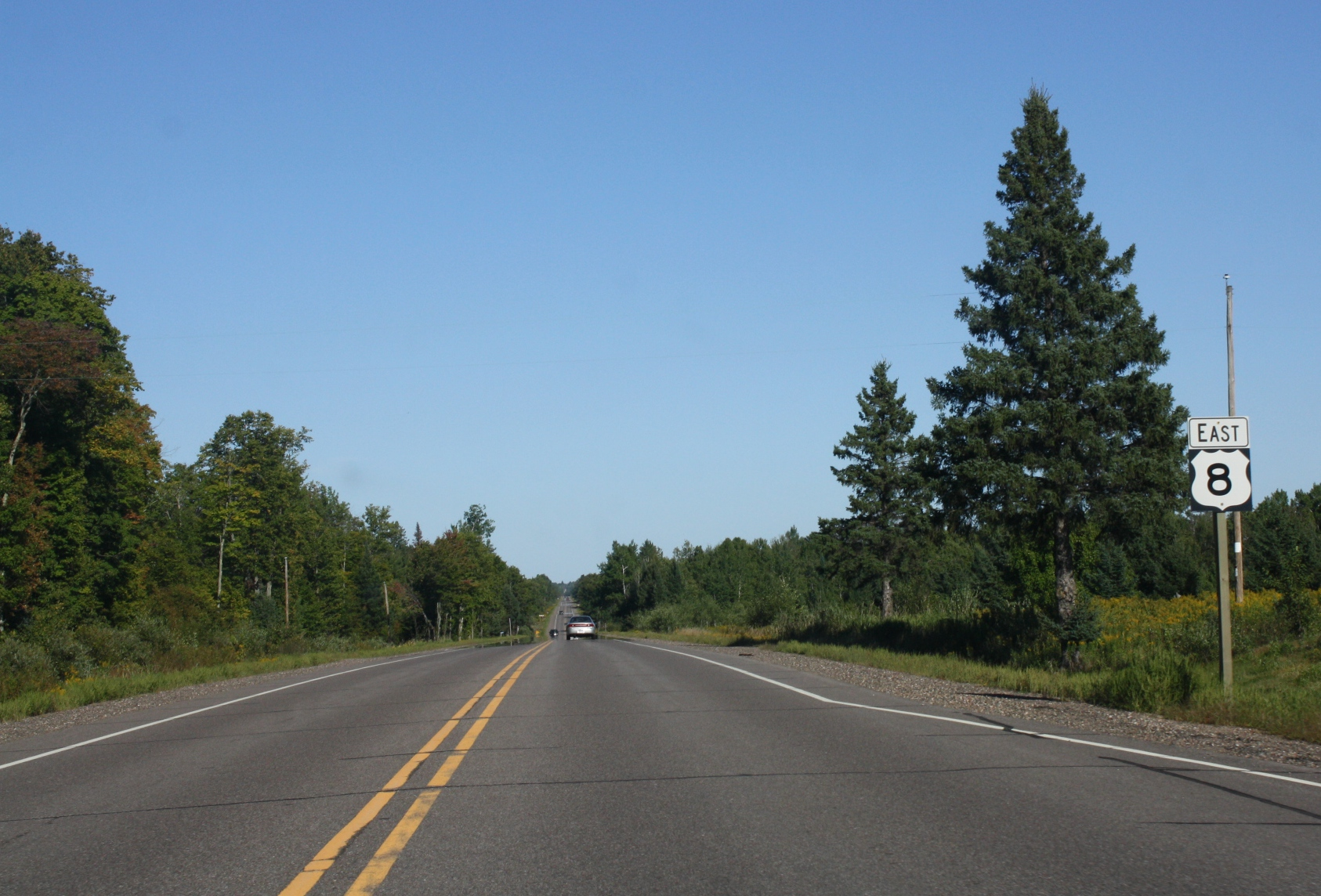
US 8 in Lincoln County, Wisconsin, near Tripoli

Upon leaving Ladysmith, US 8 passes through the communities of Tony, Glen Flora, Ingram (where it meets the northern terminus of WIS 73) and Hawkins on its way out of Rusk County. In Price County, US 8 passes through Kennan and Catawba. WIS 111 terminates at its south end on US 8 just east of Catawba. US 8 meets WIS 13 at a diamond interchange northwest of Prentice and passes north of the city. The highway passes through Brantwood and enters Lincoln County at Clifford. Further east, US 8 crosses Tripoli and McCord and runs north of Tomahawk as it passes through the Lake Nokomis area. US 51 crosses US 8 northeast of Tomahawk. US 8 turns northeast into Oneida County and onto a forested twisting northeasterly alignment. For much of this segment the highway follows the Soo Line Railroad. The highway passes through Woodboro and passes several lakes. A few miles before Rhinelander, the highway expands to a divided highway into Rhinelander. During this stretch, the highway has an exempt railroad crossing with only crossbucks. It merges with WIS 47 at a roundabout on the southwest side of Rhinelander. WIS 17 north joins the highways one-half mile (0.80 km) to the southeast, creating a wrong-way concurrency with WIS 47; along this section of highway, eastbound US 8 is also southbound WIS 47 and northbound WIS 17 and vice versa. WIS 17 turns to the north two miles (3.2 km) southeast of there, and US 8 and WIS 47 head eastbound out of the Rhinelander area.

=== Rhinelander to Norway ===
US 8 intersects US 45 south in Monico, and WIS 47 splits from US 8 to follow US 45 south. Immediately east of the same intersection, US 45 north follows US 8 for one mile (1.6 km) before splitting to the north. US 8 enters Forest County five miles (8.0 km) east of Monico. Seven miles (11 km) into the county, the highway merges with WIS 32 from the north in Crandon and the two highways head east to Laona where US 8 turns north and WIS 32 turns south. US 8 turns east again at Cavour and passes through the community of Armstrong Creek one mile (1.6 km) from the Marinette County line. The highway passes through Goodman and Dunbar as it meanders through the county and joins US 141 at Pembine. The two routes split 10 miles (16 km) further north near Niagara; after the split, US 8 heads east. The highway takes a northward turn and heads across the Menominee River into Michigan near Pier's Gorge Park.

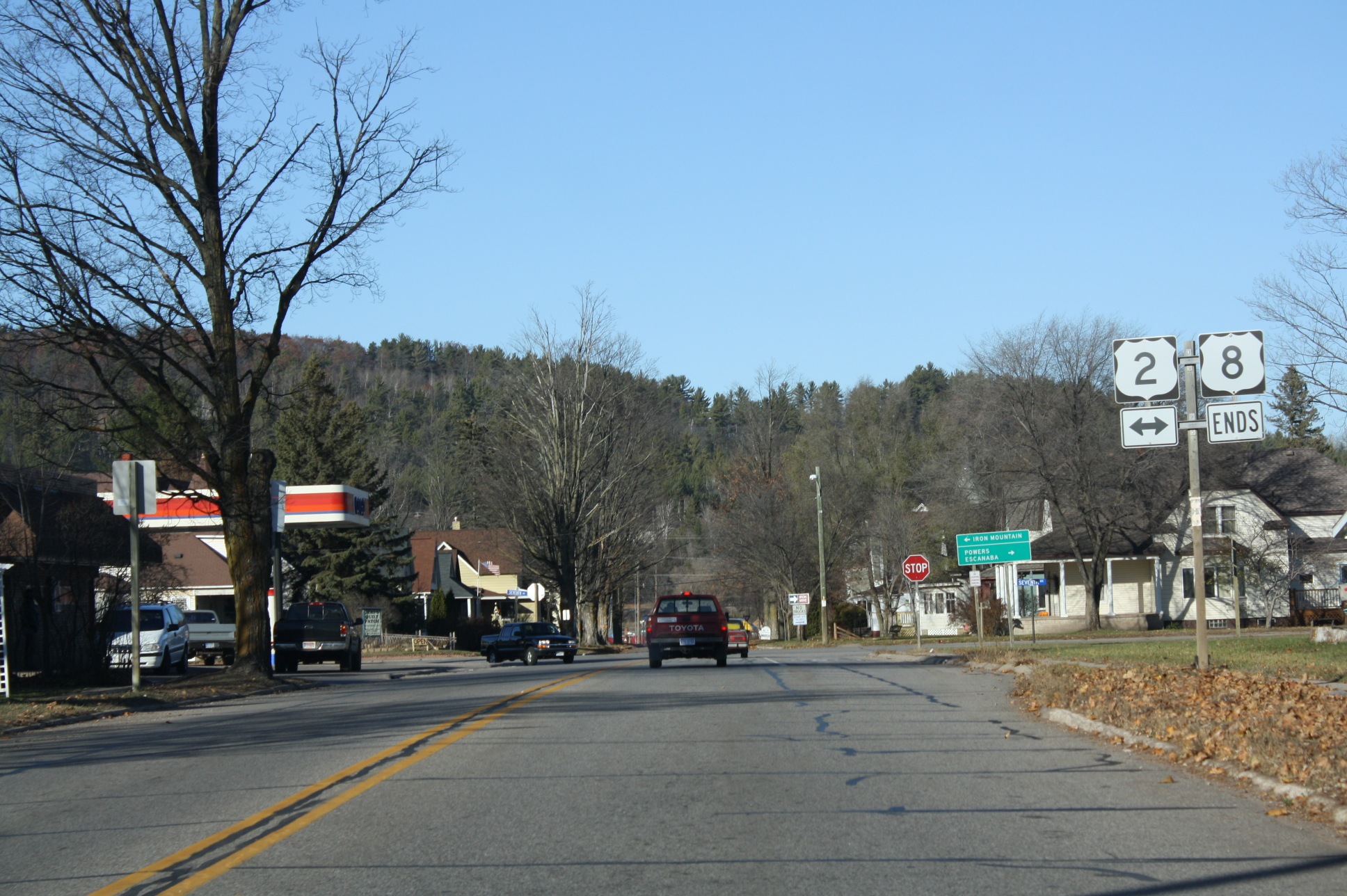
Eastern terminus in Norway

Entering Michigan south of Norway at the Menominee River crossing in Norway Township, US 8 proceeds north into the city where it ends at US 2. US 8 in Michigan is 2.322 miles (3.737 km) long; in this segment, the road passes by the Dickinson County fairgrounds and Norway Speedway.

== History ==
=== 20th century ===
Starting in 1918, the Wisconsin Highway Commission erected highway numbers along state-maintained roadways. The highway across the state from St. Croix Falls to Armstrong Creek was numbered WIS 14 at that time. The remainder of what is now US 8 was unnumbered secondary highways, and WIS 14 continued north of Armstrong Creek to Florence. When Michigan numbered its highway system the following year, the future US 8 was not included in the system. In Minnesota, US 8 would follow what was Constitutional Route 46, which was designated in a state constitutional amendment adopted on November 2, 1920; that roadway originally ran between Forest Lake and Chisago City through Wyoming.

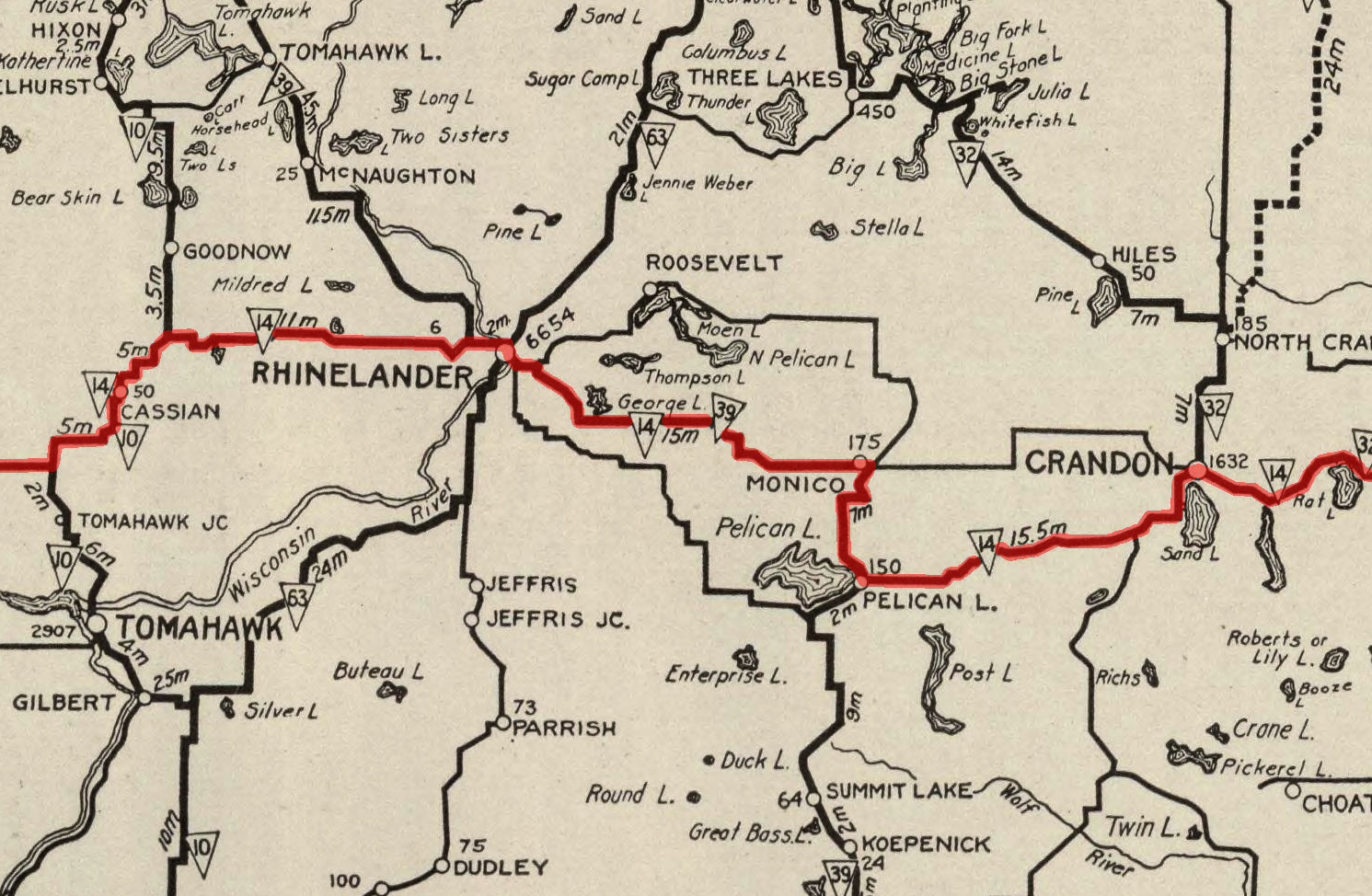
Rhinelander area, 1924, with WIS 14 highlighted in red

The first changes to the routings of the predecessor highways were made by Wisconsin by 1920. A series of curves were added between Turtle Lake and Barron adding "stair steps" to the routing while similar jogs were removed near Cameron, Weyerhauser, Hawkins and Prentice. WIS 14 was rerouted between Rhinelander and Pelican Lake to run via Monico, and WIS 38 (the future US 141) was extended northward from Wausaukee to terminate at the state line near Niagara. The realignment between Rhinelander and Pelican Lake was shown as reversed by 1922. By 1925, the highway in that area was again rerouted to run directly from Rhinelander to Monico, but instead of turning south to Pelican Lake, it was run directly to Crandon. That same year, WIS 14 was extended eastward from Armstrong Creek to Pembine and northward to Niagara. The north–south section, previously numbered WIS 38, was also redesignated as part of WIS 57.

US 8 was created with the beginnings of the United States Numbered Highway System on November 11, 1926. The highway was originally shown on maps running between Forest Lake, Minnesota and Powers, Michigan. At the time, its planned routing was not previously designated as part of the State Trunkline Highway System in Michigan. The trunkline connection from Quinnesec south into Wisconsin was part of M-57, which met WIS 57 at the state line. US 8 ended at WIS 57 in Pembine at the time, with no connection into Michigan shown on official maps. A map by the American Automobile Association does show the highway continuing east through Faithorn and Hermansville in Michigan to end at US 2. The Wisconsin Highway Commission previously indicated an unnumbered state highway on their 1925 state map that connected Pembine with the Menominee River near Hermansville. A later extension in 1927 moved US 8 to run along US 141, which had replaced WIS 57 and M-57, ending in Quinnesec at US 2. By the next year, the highway was shifted to end in Norway, utilizing a separate crossing of the Menominee River to enter Michigan.

In 1931, US 8 was extended south from Forest Lake into downtown Minneapolis. West of the Rhinelander area, US 8 and US 51 overlapped for about eight miles (13 km) as US 8 jogged northward along US 51. This concurrency was altered in 1934, and two years later the short east–west section of US 8/US 51 was removed when changes to US 51's routing were finished in the area. A jog in the routing near Almena was removed in 1937 when Wisconsin rerouted the highway to a more direct alignment in the area.

The last segment of US 8 in Wisconsin was paved in 1937 between Cavour and Armstrong Creek; the highway in Minnesota was paved in its entirety by 1940. Near Hawkins, a pair of sharp curves near the Rusk–Price county line were removed as the State Highway Commission realigned the highway to follow a straighter course. The US 8/US 51 concurrency was altered the next year to a shorter overlap running southward near Heafford Junction. The former routing of US 8 was redesignated County Trunk Highway K (CTH-K) after it was transferred back to county control.

Starting around the year 1955, US 8 was moved to a more direct routing between Forest Lake and Chisago City; US 8 replaced MN 98 along Legislative Route 98. The former routing between Wyoming and Chisago City along Constitutional Route 46 was then redesignated MN 98 until it was decommissioned in the late 1990s.

As late as 1959, the Michigan State Highway Department still had plans to build the section of US 8 west of Hermansville to the Menominee River. The control section atlas published on January 1, 1959, showed this segment of highway on the Menominee County map, complete with a control section number. The section of highway is shown as "proposed" or "under construction". However, a new bridge was built over the Menominee River to carry the highway across the Michigan–Wisconsin state line near Norway in 1966. WisDOT still shows the section of highway needed in their state to extend US 8 to the original eastern terminus in Michigan on internal maps. The December 31, 2004, edition of their Official State Trunk Highway System Maps shows this section as a "mapped corridor".

In the late 1970s, with ongoing construction and completion of the I-35W freeway in Minnesota, US 8 was routed along I-35W; US 8 was truncated again by 1981 to its current terminus in Forest Lake. The section in New Brighton is currently known as Old Highway 8.

WisDOT built a bypass of the city of Rhinelander during the early 1990s; the new highway was constructed south of town as a new two-lane highway that opened to traffic by 1993. The former route through downtown Rhinelander and near Clear and George lakes was redesignated as Business US 8 (Bus. US 8).

=== 21st century ===
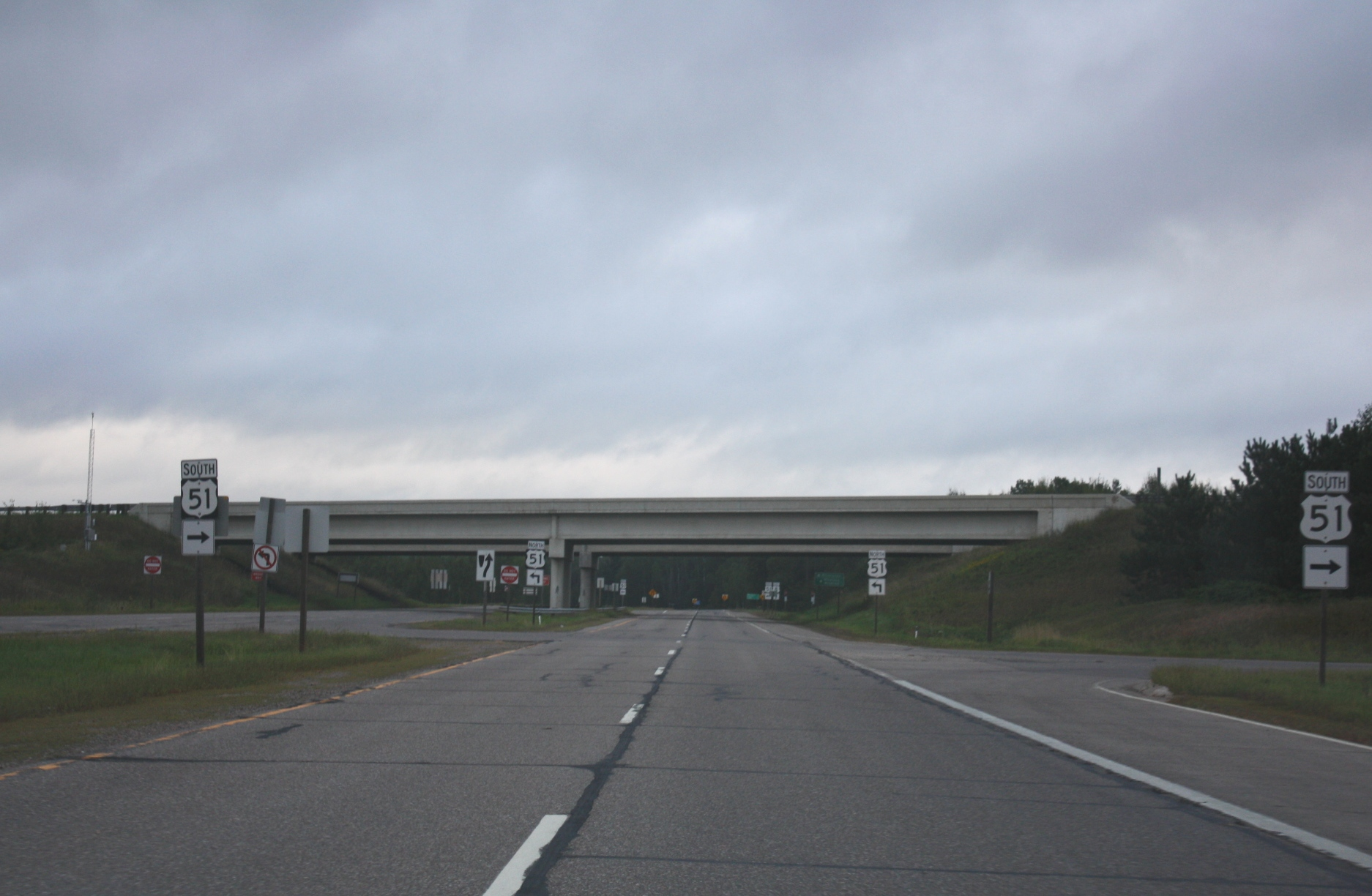
Junction with US 51, September 2011

In 2002, US 8 was widened from two lanes to four lanes with a grass median between North Rifle Road and WIS 47 near Rhinelander, Wisconsin. At the time, officials with WisDOT had plans to extend the four-lane divided highway as far west as US 51 near Tomahawk. Problems related to wetlands in the construction area and bad weather pushed completion of the project back almost a year. Contractors had to install metal sheeting to stabilize the marshy ground. Originally scheduled to end in late 2002, the project did not finish until August 2003. The delays and additional work increased the price tag of the project from the original $4.5 million (equivalent to $7.3 million in 2024) to $6.0 million (equivalent to $9.8 million in 2024). A section of the project was only designed for 45-mile-per-hour (72 km/h) speeds for safety reasons. The design also allowed planners to limit the amount of land needed for the expansion.

Bill and Jerri Osberg sued the state and seven other parties in April 2003 over runoff from the construction, claiming that it killed hundreds of trees and polluted ponds on their property. Later investigation uncovered damage to wildlife habitat in the Wisconsin River. Included in the original lawsuit were six individual WisDOT employees, the primary contractor and a local pet supply company. The court of appeals partially upheld a ruling by the district court dismissing the employees and the contractor from the lawsuit in March 2006. The pet supply company was reinstated in the case by the appeals court. The couple settled their claims, and the state pursued the matter against Pagel Construction in a related lawsuit. WisDOT alleged that the contractor did not follow proper erosion controls and failed to remediate the erosion damage to the Osbergs' property. The state wanted the construction company to forfeit their $70,000 retainer (equivalent to $114,000 in 2024) and pay damages of $150,000 (equivalent to $218,000 in 2024). Pagel Construction faulted WisDOT's erosion control plan and said that the state's engineers controlled the project and was seeking the return of its retainer. In September 2007, a jury ruled in favor of Pagel Construction and awarded them $70,898.13 in damages (equivalent to $103,026 in 2024).

In the 2020s, the entire US 8 corridor through Wisconsin was designated as an Alternative Fuel Corridor for electric vehicles.

== Future ==
WisDOT has completed the environmental studies of bypasses of Barron and Cameron in Barron County. These bypasses would form a continuous expressway through the area. No funding has been identified to complete the projects. The entire length of US 8 in the state has been classified as a North Country Corridor in the Connections 2030 Plan by the department. This designation marks the highway as a priority in "continued safety, enhanced mobility and efficiency" as well as "modernization to correct outdated infrastructure design".

== Major intersections ==
State	County	Location	mi (Note: Mileposts reset at state line crossings.)	km	Destinations	Notes
Minnesota	Washington	Forest Lake	0.000	0.000	I-35 south – St. Paul, Minneapolis	Exit 132 on I-35; northbound exit to US 8 only
Minnesota	Washington	Forest Lake	1.054	1.696	US 61 (Forest Boulevard) to I-35 north – St. Paul, Wyoming	
Minnesota	Chisago	Chisago City	7.313	11.769	CSAH 36 / CSAH 22 – Wyoming	Former MN 98
Minnesota	Chisago	Franconia–Shafer township line	18.745	30.167	MN 95 south (Tern Avenue) / St. Croix Scenic Byway – Stillwater	Western end of MN 95 concurrency
Minnesota	Chisago	Taylors Falls	22.029	35.452	MN 95 north / St. Croix Scenic Byway – North Branch, Taylors Falls	Eastern end of MN 95 concurrency; North Branch only signed eastbound, Taylors Falls only signed westbound
St. Croix River			22.129 0.00	35.613 0.00	Minnesota–Wisconsin state line	
Wisconsin	Polk	St. Croix Falls	0.27	0.43	WIS 87 north – Grantsburg	Access to St. Croix Health
Wisconsin	Polk	St. Croix Falls	0.77	1.24	WIS 35 south – Osceola	Western end of WIS 35 concurrency; diamond interchange; access to St. Croix Health, Interstate Park, and Gandy Dancer State Trail
Wisconsin	Polk	Town of St. Croix Falls	4.72	7.60	WIS 35 north – Centuria, Frederic, Superior	Eastern end of WIS 35 concurrency; Centuria only signed eastbound, Frederic and Superior only signed westbound
Wisconsin	Polk	Town of Balsam Lake	7.92	12.75	WIS 65 south (160th Street) – New Richmond	
Wisconsin	Polk	Town of Balsam Lake	10.02	16.13	WIS 46 north – Balsam Lake	Western end of WIS 46 concurrency
Wisconsin	Polk	Town of Apple River	14.40	23.17	WIS 46 south (131st Avenue) – Amery	Eastern end of WIS 46 concurrency; access to Amery Hospital and Clinic
Wisconsin	Polk	Town of Beaver	23.63	38.03	US 63 south / CTH-T – Baldwin	Western end of US 63 concurrency
Wisconsin	Barron	Turtle Lake	24.90	40.07	US 63 north (Maple Street) – Cumberland, Spooner	Eastern end of US 63 concurrency
Wisconsin	Barron	Barron	38.89	62.59	WIS 25 south – Menomonie	Western end of WIS 25 concurrency
Wisconsin	Barron	Barron	39.28	63.22	WIS 25 north – Rice Lake	Eastern end of WIS 25 concurrency
Wisconsin	Barron	Town of Stanley	43.94	70.71	US 53 – Eau Claire, Rice Lake, Superior	
Wisconsin	Rusk	Bruce	68.43	110.13	WIS 40 north – Radisson	Western end of WIS 40 concurrency
Wisconsin	Rusk	Bruce	69.04	111.11	WIS 40 south / Bus. WIS 40 – Bloomer	Eastern end of WIS 40 concurrency
Wisconsin	Rusk	Ladysmith	77.33	124.45	WIS 27 – Cornell, Ojibwa	Access to Marshfield Medical Center - Ladysmith Rusk County
Wisconsin	Rusk	Town of Richland	92.80	149.35	WIS 73 south – Ingram, Thorp, Jump River	
Wisconsin	Price	Town of Catawba	109.00	175.42	WIS 111 north – Phillips	
Wisconsin	Price	Town of Prentice	117.76	189.52	WIS 13 – Medford, Phillips, Park Falls	
Wisconsin	Lincoln	Town of Bradley	149.94	241.31	US 51 – Merrill, Wausau, Minocqua, Woodruff	Diamond interchange; exit 234 on US 51
Wisconsin	Oneida	Rhinelander	164.13	264.14	WIS 47 north (Kemp Street) – Woodruff	Western end of WIS 47 concurrency; Kemp Street is former Bus. US 8
Wisconsin	Oneida	Rhinelander	164.31	264.43	WIS 17 south – Merrill	Western end of WIS 17 concurrency
Wisconsin	Oneida	Rhinelander	164.42	264.61	WIS 17 north – Rhinelander, Eagle River	Eastern end of WIS 17 concurrency; access to Ascension St. Mary's Hospital
Wisconsin	Oneida	Town of Pelican	170.19	273.89	CTH-P west	Former Bus. US 8
Wisconsin	Oneida	Town of Monico	178.34	287.01	US 45 south / WIS 47 south – Antigo	Eastern end of WIS 47 concurrency; western end of US 45 concurrency
Wisconsin	Oneida	Town of Monico	179.12	288.27	US 45 north – Three Lakes, Eagle River	Eastern end of US 45 concurrency
Wisconsin	Forest	Crandon	191.11	307.56	WIS 32 north / WIS 55 north – Three Lakes, Iron River	Northern end of WIS 32 / WIS 55 concurrency
Wisconsin	Forest	Crandon	191.61	308.37	WIS 55 south – Mole Lake, Shawano	Southern end of WIS 55 concurrency
Wisconsin	Forest	Town of Laona	202.98	326.66	WIS 32 south – Wabeno	Eastern end of WIS 32 concurrency
Wisconsin	Forest	Town of Caswell	210.51	338.78	WIS 139 north – Long Lake, Iron River	Southern terminus of WIS 139
Wisconsin	Forest	Town of Armstrong Creek	220.28	354.51	WIS 101 north – Florence	
Wisconsin	Marinette	Town of Pembine	243.89	392.50	US 141 south – Green Bay	Southern end of US 141 concurrency
Wisconsin	Marinette	Town of Niagara	253.41	407.82	US 141 north – Niagara, Iron Mountain	Northern end of US 141 concurrency
Menominee River			255.55 0.000	411.27 0.000	Wisconsin–Michigan state line	
Michigan	Dickinson	Norway	2.322	3.737	US 2 – Iron Mountain, Powers, Escanaba	
1.000 mi = 1.609 km; 1.000 km = 0.621 mi: Concurrency terminus; Incomplete access

== Business route ==
Business U.S. Highway 8
- Location: Rhinelander, Wisconsin
- Length: 7.1 mi (11.4 km)
- Existed: October 3, 1992–July 1, 2005

Business U.S. Highway 8 (Bus. US 8) in Rhinelander, Wisconsin, was a locally maintained business loop highway routing through the central business district of the city. The route was designated when US 8 was shifted to a bypass of downtown in 1992. The former routing of US 8 through the area was designated as a business loop, and it was turned over to the city and county for maintenance. The local authorities erected signs along this route to designate it as a business loop of the main highway south of town. The signs along the road were scheduled to be removed on July 1, 2005, when the business loop was to be redesignated CTH-P.

Before the signage was removed, Bus. US 8 started at the western junction of US 8 and WIS 47. The business loop ran east from this intersection along Kemp Street, crossing the Wisconsin River north of the convergence with the Pelican River. The loop jogged north along Oneida Street for three blocks and turned east again on Lincoln Street. East of town, Bus. US 8 intersected WIS 17 and turned to the southeast. Outside of town, the business loop ran through wooded terrain and turned south near Clear Lake. Near the larger George Lake, the roadway curved back east along the lake's southern shore, running parallel to the main highway before turning south to connect to the main highway. At this intersection with US 8/WIS 47, the business loop ended after a total run of 7.1 miles (11.4 km).

== See also ==
- U.S. Highway 208
