= Catawba =

Catawba may refer to:

- Catawba people, a Native American tribe in the Carolinas
- Catawba language, a language in the Catawban languages family
- Catawban languages

== Botany ==
- Catalpa, a genus of trees, based on the name used by the Catawba and other Native American tribes
- Catawba (grape), a variety of grape
- Catawba rhododendron (Rhododendron catawbiense), a flowering shrub plant

== Places in the United States ==
- Catawba, Missouri
- Catawba, North Carolina
- Catawba, Ohio
- Catawba Island Township, Ottawa County, Ohio
- Catawba Island State Park, part of Lake Erie Islands State Park, Ohio
- Catawba, South Carolina
- Catawba, Virginia
- Catawba, West Virginia
- Catawba, Wisconsin
- Catawba (town), Wisconsin
- Catawba County, North Carolina
- Catawba Mountain, see Catawba, Virginia
- Catawba River
- Catawba Valley, see Catawba, Virginia

== Other ==
- USS Catawba, the name of an ironclad and several United States Navy tugs
- Catawba College, Salisbury, North Carolina
- Catawba Nuclear Station, near Rock Hill, South Carolina
- Catawba Two Kings Casino, Kings Mountain, North Carolina
- Camp Catawba, a former boys' camp in the Blue Ridge Mountains of North Carolina
- Catawba worm, the larval stage of the Ceratomia catalpae moth
- Catawba Hospital, a mental health facility in Catawba, Virginia
- Catawba, a fictional state in Thomas Wolfe's Look Homeward, Angel
