= Prentice (town), Wisconsin =

Town in Price County, Wisconsin

Prentice, Wisconsin
- Town
- Town of Prentice
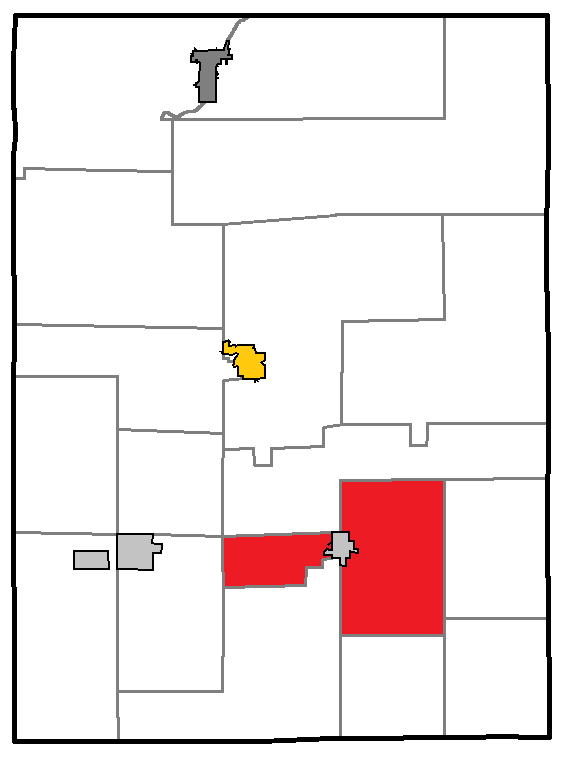
- Location of Prentice, within Price County
- Coordinates: 45°31′50″N 90°14′00″W
- Country: United States
- State: Wisconsin
- County: Price

Area
  - Total: 69.25 sq mi (179.4 km^{2})
  - Land: 69.11 sq mi (179.0 km^{2})
  - Water: 0.15 sq mi (0.39 km^{2})

Population (2020)
  - Total: 440
  - Density: 6.4/sq mi (2.5/km^{2})
- Time zone: UTC-6 (Central (CST))
  - Summer (DST): UTC-5 (CDT)
- Area code(s): 715 & 534
- GNIS feature ID: 1583979

Prentice is a town in Price County, Wisconsin, United States. The population was 440 at the 2020 census. The village of Prentice and the unincorporated community of Pennington are located within the town.

== Geography ==
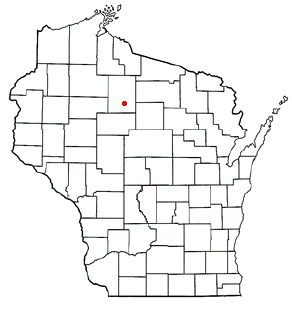
Location of Prentice (town), Wisconsin

The town is irregularly shaped, consisting of a typically rectangular shape to the east of the Village of Prentice adjoined to an irregular rectangular slab west of the village, north of the Town of Ogema, east of the Town of Catawba, and south of the Town of Hackett.

According to the United States Census Bureau, the town has a total area of 69.5 square miles (180.1 km^{2}), of which 69.3 square miles (179.6 km^{2}) is land and 0.2 square mile (0.5 km^{2}) (0.26%) is water.

The northern trailhead of Wisconsin's Pine Line Trail, an unpaved, multiuse rail-trail extending just over 26 miles to Medford in the south, lies just outside Prentice.

=== Airport ===
Prentice is served by the Prentice Airport (5N2). Located one mile east of the village, the airport handles approximately 1,500 operations per year, with roughly 99% general aviation and 1% air taxi. The airport has a 3,250 foot asphalt runway (Runway 9-27).

== Demographics ==
As of the census of 2000, there were 479 people, 196 households, and 137 families residing in the town. The population density was 6.9 people per square mile (2.7/km^{2}). There were 263 housing units at an average density of 3.8 per square mile (1.5/km^{2}). The racial makeup of the town was 98.75% White, 0.21% Native American, 0.21% Asian, and 0.84% from two or more races. 0.63% of the population were Hispanic or Latino of any race.

There were 196 households, out of which 28.1% had children under the age of 18 living with them, 63.3% were married couples living together, 5.1% had a female householder with no husband present, and 29.6% were non-families. 25.0% of all households were made up of individuals, and 10.2% had someone living alone who was 65 years of age or older. The average household size was 2.44 and the average family size was 2.92.

In the town, the population was spread out, with 24.6% under the age of 18, 6.3% from 18 to 24, 26.7% from 25 to 44, 27.8% from 45 to 64, and 14.6% who were 65 years of age or older. The median age was 40 years. For every 100 females, there were 110.1 males. For every 100 females age 18 and over, there were 107.5 males.

The median income for a household in the town was $41,875, and the median income for a family was $47,206. Males had a median income of $30,972 versus $23,333 for females. The per capita income for the town was $17,587. About 2.1% of families and 5.5% of the population were below the poverty line, including 3.4% of those under age 18 and 13.3% of those age 65 or over.
