= Georgetown, Wisconsin =

Georgetown is the name of some places in the U.S. state of Wisconsin:

- Georgetown, Grant County, Wisconsin, an unincorporated community
- Georgetown, Polk County, Wisconsin, a town
- Georgetown, Price County, Wisconsin, a town
