= Eisenstein, Wisconsin =

- Town
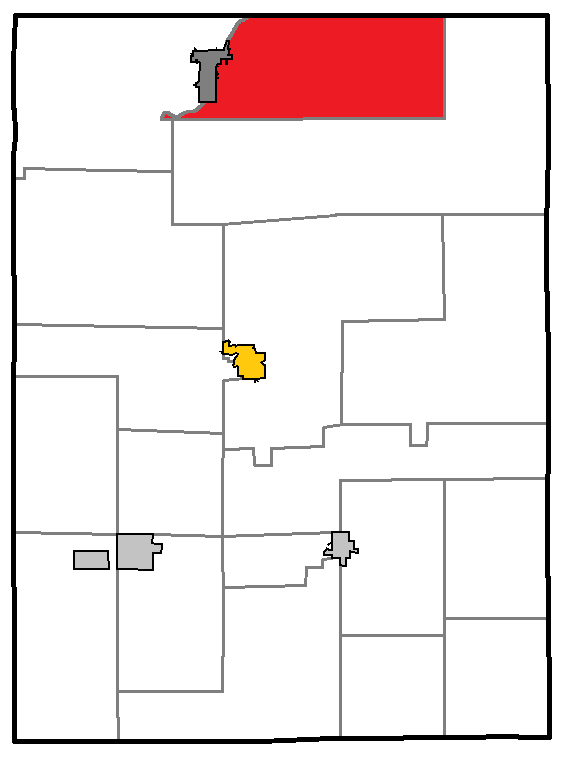
- Location of Eisenstein, within Price County
- Coordinates: 45°56′16″N 90°17′58″W
- Country: United States
- State: Wisconsin
- County: Price

Area
  - Total: 76.3 sq mi (197.7 km^{2})
  - Land: 74.9 sq mi (194.0 km^{2})
  - Water: 1.4 sq mi (3.7 km^{2})
- Elevation: 1,516 ft (462 m)

Population (2020)
  - Total: 625
  - Density: 8.34/sq mi (3.22/km^{2})
- Time zone: UTC-6 (Central (CST))
  - Summer (DST): UTC-5 (CDT)
- Area codes: 715 & 534
- FIPS code: 55-22950
- GNIS feature ID: 1583139

Eisenstein is a town in Price County, Wisconsin, United States. The population was 625 at the 2020 census.

== Geography ==
According to the United States Census Bureau, the town has a total area of 76.3 square miles (197.7 km^{2}), of which 74.9 square miles (194.0 km^{2}) is land and 1.4 square miles (3.7 km^{2}) (1.85%) is water.

== Demographics ==
As of the census of 2000, there were 669 people, 272 households, and 201 families residing in the town. The population density was 8.9 people per square mile (3.4/km^{2}). There were 469 housing units at an average density of 6.3 per square mile (2.4/km^{2}). The racial makeup of the town was 96.56% White, 0.45% African American, 1.49% Native American, 0.15% from other races, and 1.35% from two or more races. Hispanic or Latino people of any race were 0.60% of the population.

There were 272 households, out of which 27.9% had children under the age of 18 living with them, 65.1% were married couples living together, 4.0% had a female householder with no husband present, and 26.1% were non-families. 22.1% of all households were made up of individuals, and 9.6% had someone living alone who was 65 years of age or older. The average household size was 2.46 and the average family size was 2.84.

In the town, the population was spread out, with 22.6% under the age of 18, 3.7% from 18 to 24, 27.2% from 25 to 44, 28.4% from 45 to 64, and 18.1% who were 65 years of age or older. The median age was 43 years. For every 100 females, there were 118.6 males. For every 100 females age 18 and over, there were 113.2 males.

The median income for a household in the town was $38,026, and the median income for a family was $43,906. Males had a median income of $32,188 versus $21,250 for females. The per capita income for the town was $18,414. About 7.3% of families and 7.8% of the population were below the poverty line, including 8.2% of those under age 18 and 11.4% of those age 65 or over.

== History ==
The town of Eisenstein gets its name from the village of the same name located on the border of Bavaria and Bohemia, from which several of the original families immigrated. (See Bayerisch Eisenstein and Železná Ruda.)
