= Kennan (town), Wisconsin =

Town in Price County, Wisconsin

Kennan, Wisconsin
- Town
- Town of Kennan
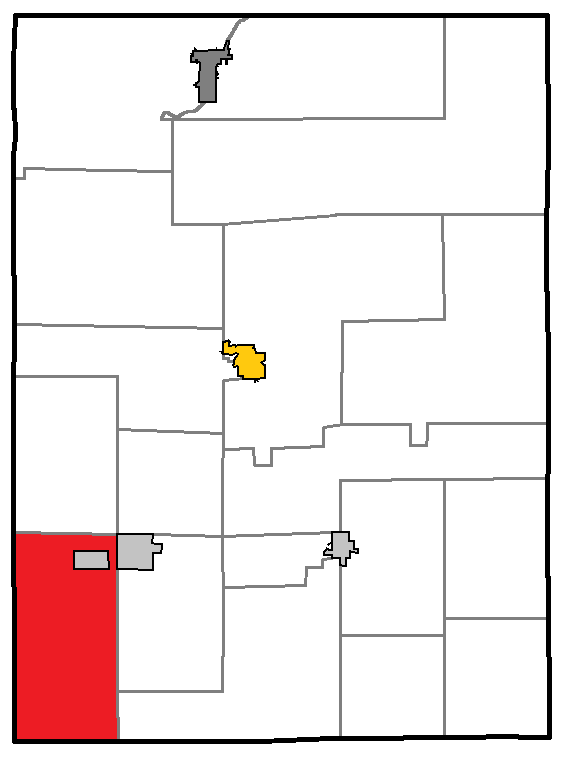
- Location of Kennan, within Price County
- Coordinates: 45°29′16″N 90°36′57″W
- Country: United States
- State: Wisconsin
- County: Price

Area
  - Total: 69.98 sq mi (181.2 km^{2})
  - Land: 69.93 sq mi (181.1 km^{2})
  - Water: 0.04 sq mi (0.10 km^{2})

Population (2020)
  - Total: 365
  - Density: 5.22/sq mi (2.02/km^{2})
- Time zone: UTC-6 (Central (CST))
  - Summer (DST): UTC-5 (CDT)
- Area code(s): 715 & 534
- GNIS feature ID: 1583471

Kennan is a town in Price County, Wisconsin, United States. The population was 365 at the 2020 census. The Village of Kennan is located within the town.

== Geography ==
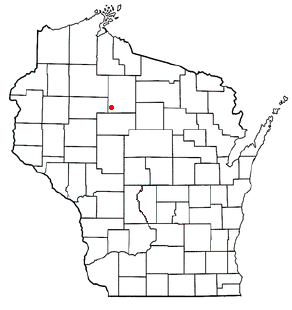
Location of Kennan (town), Wisconsin

According to the United States Census Bureau, the town has a total area of 70.0 square miles (181.2 km^{2}), of which 69.9 square miles (181.1 km^{2}) is land and 0.1 square mile (0.1 km^{2}) (0.07%) is water.

== Demographics ==
As of the census of 2000, there were 378 people, 129 households, and 110 families residing in the town. The population density was 5.4 people per square mile (2.1/km^{2}). There were 182 housing units at an average density of 2.6 per square mile (1.0/km^{2}). The racial makeup of the town was 99.47% White, 0.53% from other races. 0.53% of the population were Hispanic or Latino of any race.

There were 129 households, out of which 44.2% had children under the age of 18 living with them, 73.6% were married couples living together, 6.2% had a female householder with no husband present, and 14.0% were non-families. 13.2% of all households were made up of individuals, and 3.1% had someone living alone who was 65 years of age or older. The average household size was 2.93 and the average family size was 3.22.

In the town, the population was spread out, with 30.7% under the age of 18, 5.0% from 18 to 24, 29.1% from 25 to 44, 19.6% from 45 to 64, and 15.6% who were 65 years of age or older. The median age was 37 years. For every 100 females, there were 106.6 males. For every 100 females age 18 and over, there were 120.2 males.

The median income for a household in the town was $33,571, and the median income for a family was $33,393. Males had a median income of $26,625 versus $17,000 for females. The per capita income for the town was $12,546. About 7.3% of families and 10.9% of the population were below the poverty line, including 15.7% of those under age 18 and 18.0% of those age 65 or over.
