= Elk, Wisconsin =

- Town
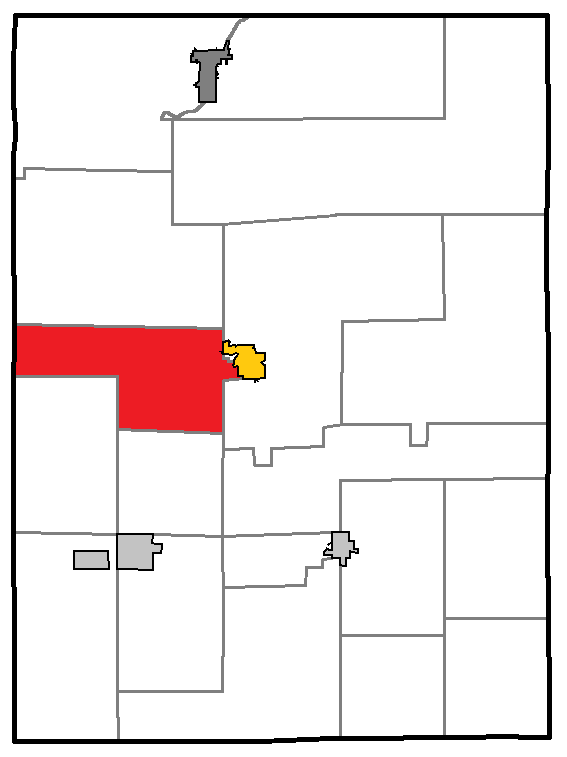
- Location of Elk, within Price County
- Coordinates: 45°41′55″N 90°31′0″W
- Country: United States
- State: Wisconsin
- County: Price

Area
  - Total: 53.6 sq mi (138.7 km^{2})
  - Land: 50.8 sq mi (131.6 km^{2})
  - Water: 2.7 sq mi (7.1 km^{2})
- Elevation: 1,437 ft (438 m)

Population (2020)
  - Total: 960
  - Density: 19/sq mi (7.3/km^{2})
- Time zone: UTC-6 (Central (CST))
  - Summer (DST): UTC-5 (CDT)
- Area codes: 715 & 534
- FIPS code: 55-23200
- GNIS feature ID: 1583147
- Website: https://townofelk.com/

Elk is a town in Price County, Wisconsin, United States. The population was 960 at the 2020 census.

== Geography ==
According to the United States Census Bureau (USCB), the town has a total area of 53.5 square miles (138.7 km^{2}), of which 50.8 square miles (131.6 km^{2}) is land and 2.7 square miles (7.1 km^{2}) (5.10%) is water.

== Demographics ==
As of the census of 2000, there were 1,183 people, 502 households, and 365 families residing in the town. The population density was 23.3 people per square mile (9.0/km^{2}). There were 933 housing units at an average density of 18.4 per square mile (7.1/km^{2}). The racial makeup of the town was 98.73% White, 0.51% Native American, 0.08% from other races, and 0.68% from two or more races. Hispanic or Latino people of any race were 0.59% of the population.

There were 502 households, out of which 27.7% had children under the age of 18 living with them, 66.9% were married couples living together, 5.4% had a female householder with no husband present, and 27.1% were non-families. 23.3% of all households were made up of individuals, and 11.4% had someone living alone who was 65 years of age or older. The average household size was 2.36 and the average family size was 2.78.

In the town, the population was spread out, with 21.5% under the age of 18, 5.4% from 18 to 24, 24.3% from 25 to 44, 30.2% from 45 to 64, and 18.6% who were 65 years of age or older. The median age was 44 years. For every 100 females, there were 98.5 males. For every 100 females age 18 and over, there were 96.8 males.

The median income for a household in the town was $41,953, and the median income for a family was $50,769. Males had a median income of $37,266 versus $21,607 for females. The per capita income for the town was $22,310. About 3.4% of families and 5.7% of the population were below the poverty line, including 2.7% of those under age 18 and 9.3% of those age 65 or over.

== Notable people ==
- Willis J. Hutnik, politician, educator, and businessman; born in the town
