= Price County, Wisconsin =

County in Wisconsin, United States

- County
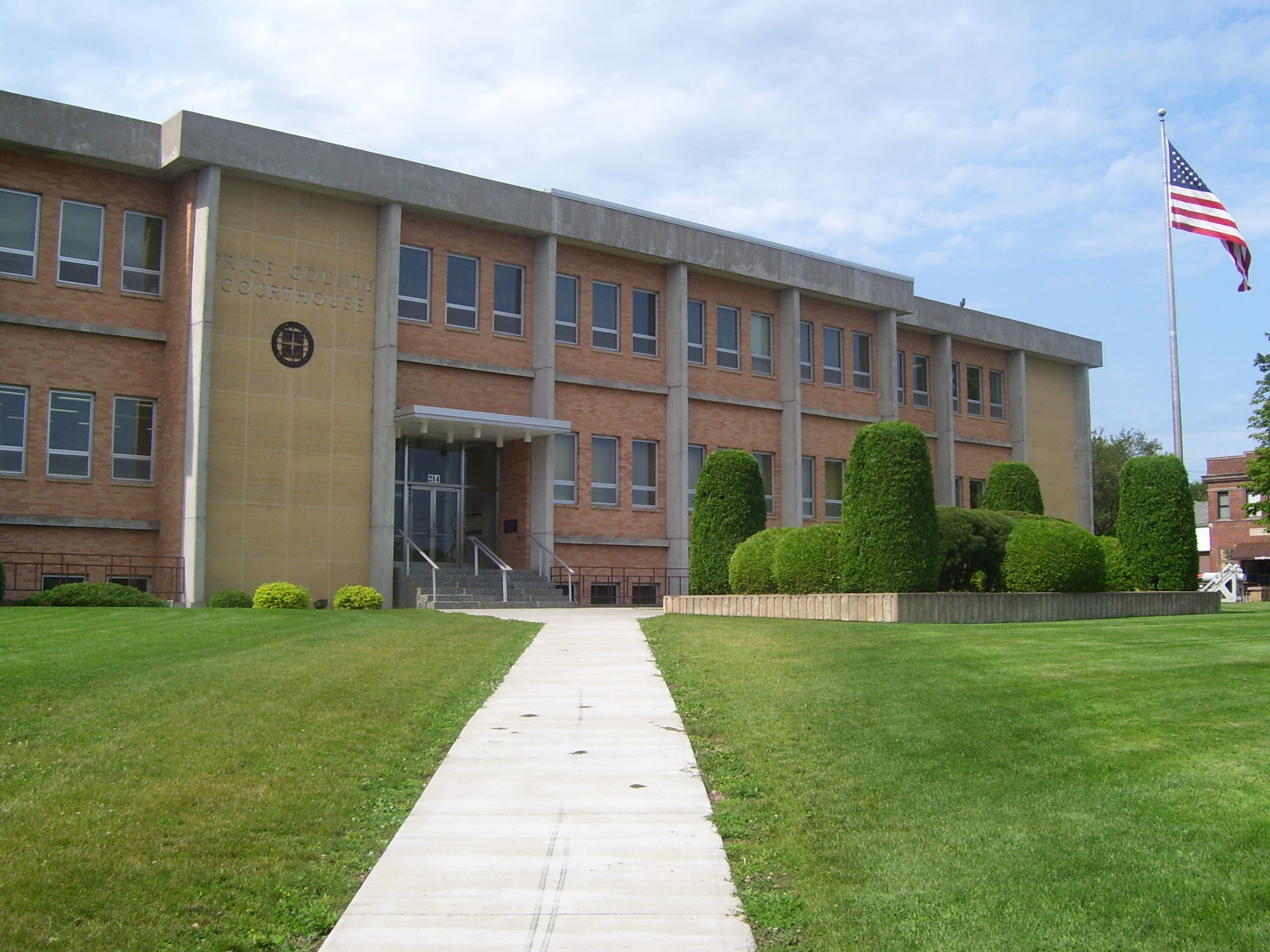
- Price County Courthouse

- Location within the U.S. state of Wisconsin
- Coordinates: 45°41′N 90°22′W
- Country: United States
- State: Wisconsin
- Founded: 1882
- Named for: William T. Price
- Seat: Phillips
- Largest city: Park Falls

Area
  - Total: 1,278 sq mi (3,310 km^{2})
  - Land: 1,254 sq mi (3,250 km^{2})
  - Water: 24 sq mi (62 km^{2}) 1.9%

Population (2020)
  - Total: 14,054
  - Estimate (2025): 13,988 ▼
  - Density: 11.2/sq mi (4.3/km^{2})
- Time zone: UTC−6 (Central)
  - Summer (DST): UTC−5 (CDT)
- Congressional district: 7th
- Website: www.co.price.wi.us

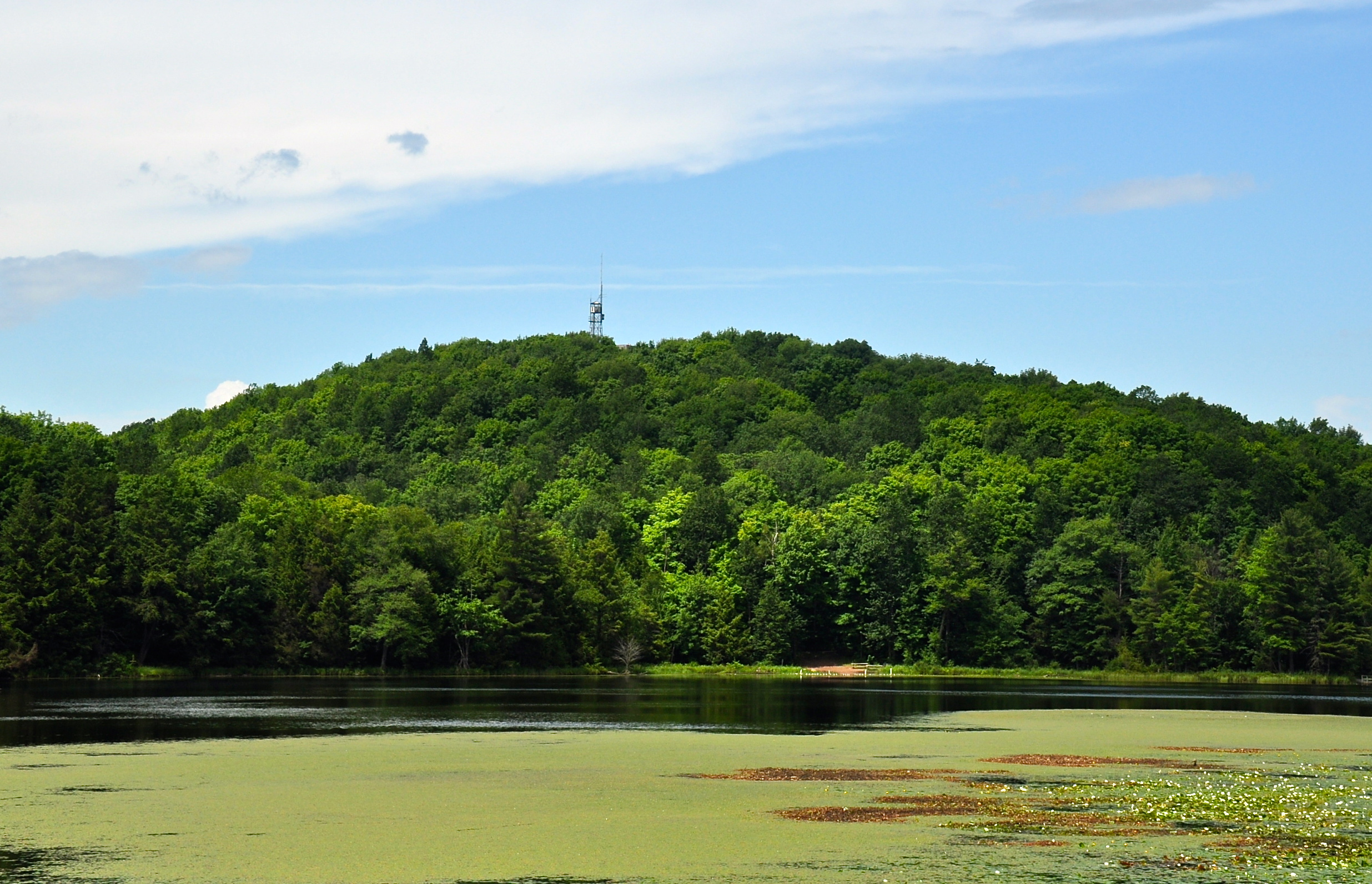
Timms Hill, the highest natural point in Wisconsin, at 1951.5 feet, is located in the Town of Hill, Price County.

Price County is a county in the U.S. state of Wisconsin. As of the 2020 census, the population was 14,054. Its county seat is Phillips.

== History ==
Price County was created on March 3, 1879, when Wisconsin Governor William E. Smith signed legislation creating the county. The county was later organized in 1882. William T. Price (1824–1886), for whom Price County was named, was President of the Wisconsin Senate and an early logger in Price County; he later was elected to the U.S. Congress. The county was formed from portions of Chippewa and Lincoln counties.

The first white settler in what is now Price County was Major Isaac Stone, who located on the Spirit River in 1860 to engage in lumbering. Price County continues today to be a large producer of raw timber.

== Geography ==
According to the U.S. Census Bureau, the county has a total area of 1,278 square miles (3,310 km^{2}), of which 1,254 square miles (3,250 km^{2}) is land and 24 square miles (62 km^{2}) (1.9%) is water. The highest natural point in Wisconsin, Timms Hill at 1,951 feet (595 m), is located in Price County.

=== Adjacent counties ===
- Ashland – northwest
- Iron – northeast
- Lincoln – southeast
- Oneida – east
- Rusk – west
- Sawyer – west
- Taylor – south
- Vilas – northeast

=== Major highways ===
- U.S. Highway 8
- Highway 13 (Wisconsin)
- Highway 70 (Wisconsin)
- Highway 86 (Wisconsin)
- Highway 102 (Wisconsin)
- Highway 111 (Wisconsin)
- Highway 182 (Wisconsin)

=== Railroads ===
- Watco

=== Buses ===
- Bay Area Rural Transit

=== Airports ===
- KPBH – Price County Airport
- KPKF – Park Falls Municipal Airport
- 5N2 – Prentice Airport

=== National protected area ===
- Chequamegon National Forest (part)

== Demographics ==
Historical population
Census	Pop.	Note	%±
1880	785		—
1890	5,258		569.8%
1900	9,106		73.2%
1910	13,795		51.5%
1920	18,517		34.2%
1930	17,284		−6.7%
1940	18,467		6.8%
1950	16,344		−11.5%
1960	14,370		−12.1%
1970	14,520		1.0%
1980	15,788		8.7%
1990	15,600		−1.2%
2000	15,822		1.4%
2010	14,159		−10.5%
2020	14,054		−0.7%
2025 (est.)	13,988	▼	−0.5%
U.S. Decennial Census; 1790–1960 1900–1990; 1990–2000 2010 2020

=== Racial and ethnic composition ===
Price County, Wisconsin – Racial and ethnic composition Note: the US Census treats Hispanic/Latino as an ethnic category. This table excludes Latinos from the racial categories and assigns them to a separate category. Hispanics/Latinos may be of any race.
Race / ethnicity (NH = Non-Hispanic)	Pop 1980	Pop 1990	Pop 2000	Pop 2010	Pop 2020	% 1980	% 1990	% 2000	% 2010	% 2020
White alone (NH)	15,680	15,434	15,462	13,661	13,157	99.32%	98.94%	97.72%	96.48%	93.62%
Black or African American alone (NH)	7	7	16	34	31	0.04%	0.04%	0.10%	0.24%	0.22%
Native American or Alaska Native alone (NH)	51	77	87	50	83	0.32%	0.49%	0.55%	0.35%	0.59%
Asian alone (NH)	7	22	47	58	67	0.04%	0.14%	0.30%	0.41%	0.48%
Native Hawaiian or Pacific Islander alone (NH)	x	x	4	64	124	x	x	0.03%	0.45%	0.88%
Other race alone (NH)	11	1	3	7	38	0.07%	0.01%	0.02%	0.05%	0.27%
Mixed race or Multiracial (NH)	x	x	87	132	374	x	x	0.55%	0.93%	2.66%
Hispanic or Latino (any race)	32	59	116	153	180	0.20%	0.38%	0.73%	1.08%	1.28%
Total	15,788	15,600	15,822	14,159	14,054	100.00%	100.00%	100.00%	100.00%	100.00%

=== 2020 census ===
As of the 2020 census, the county had a population of 14,054, which yielded a population density of 11.2 people per square mile (4.3 people/km^{2}). There were 10,735 housing units at an average density of 8.6 units per square mile (3.3 units/km^{2}).

The median age was 52.8 years, 17.7% of residents were under the age of 18, and 27.9% were 65 years of age or older. For every 100 females there were 103.8 males, and for every 100 females age 18 and over there were 103.7 males age 18 and over.

The racial makeup of the county was 94.2% White, 0.2% Black or African American, 0.6% American Indian and Alaska Native, 0.5% Asian, 0.9% Native Hawaiian and Pacific Islander, 0.5% from some other race, and 3.1% from two or more races. Hispanic or Latino residents of any race comprised 1.3% of the population.

Less than 0.1% of residents lived in urban areas, while 100.0% lived in rural areas.

There were 6,446 households in the county, of which 19.1% had children under the age of 18 living in them. Of all households, 50.0% were married-couple households, 21.4% were households with a male householder and no spouse or partner present, and 21.2% were households with a female householder and no spouse or partner present. About 33.3% of all households were made up of individuals and 16.7% had someone living alone who was 65 years of age or older.

There were 10,735 housing units, of which 40.0% were vacant. Among occupied housing units, 79.6% were owner-occupied and 20.4% were renter-occupied. The homeowner vacancy rate was 2.5% and the rental vacancy rate was 13.5%.

=== 2000 census ===
2000 Census age pyramid for Price County

As of the census of 2000, there were 15,822 people, 6,564 households, and 4,417 families residing in the county. The population density was 13 people per square mile (5.0 people/km^{2}). There were 9,574 housing units at an average density of 8 units per square mile (3.1 units/km^{2}). The racial makeup of the county was 98.22% White, 0.1% Black or African American, 0.6% Native American, 0.3% Asian, 0.03% Pacific Islander, 0.15% from other races, and 0.6% from two or more races. 0.73% of the population were Hispanic or Latino of any race. 44.4% were of German, 6.5% Norwegian, 5.9% Swedish, 5.4% Polish, 5.2% Irish and 5% Czech ancestry.

There were 6,564 households, out of which 28.9% had children under the age of 18 living with them, 56.5% were married couples living together, 6.6% had a female householder with no husband present, and 32.7% were non-families. 28.5% of all households were made up of individuals, and 14.5% had someone living alone who was 65 years of age or older. The average household size was 2.37 and the average family size was 2.91.

In the county, the population was spread out, with 23.8% under the age of 18, 5.8% from 18 to 24, 25.8% from 25 to 44, 25.7% from 45 to 64, and 18.8% who were 65 years of age or older. The median age was 42 years. For every 100 females, there were 101.00 males. For every 100 females age 18 and over, there were 99 males.

In 2017, there were 127 births, giving a general fertility rate of 71.4 births per 1000 women aged 15–44, the 13th highest rate out of all 72 Wisconsin counties.

== Communities ==
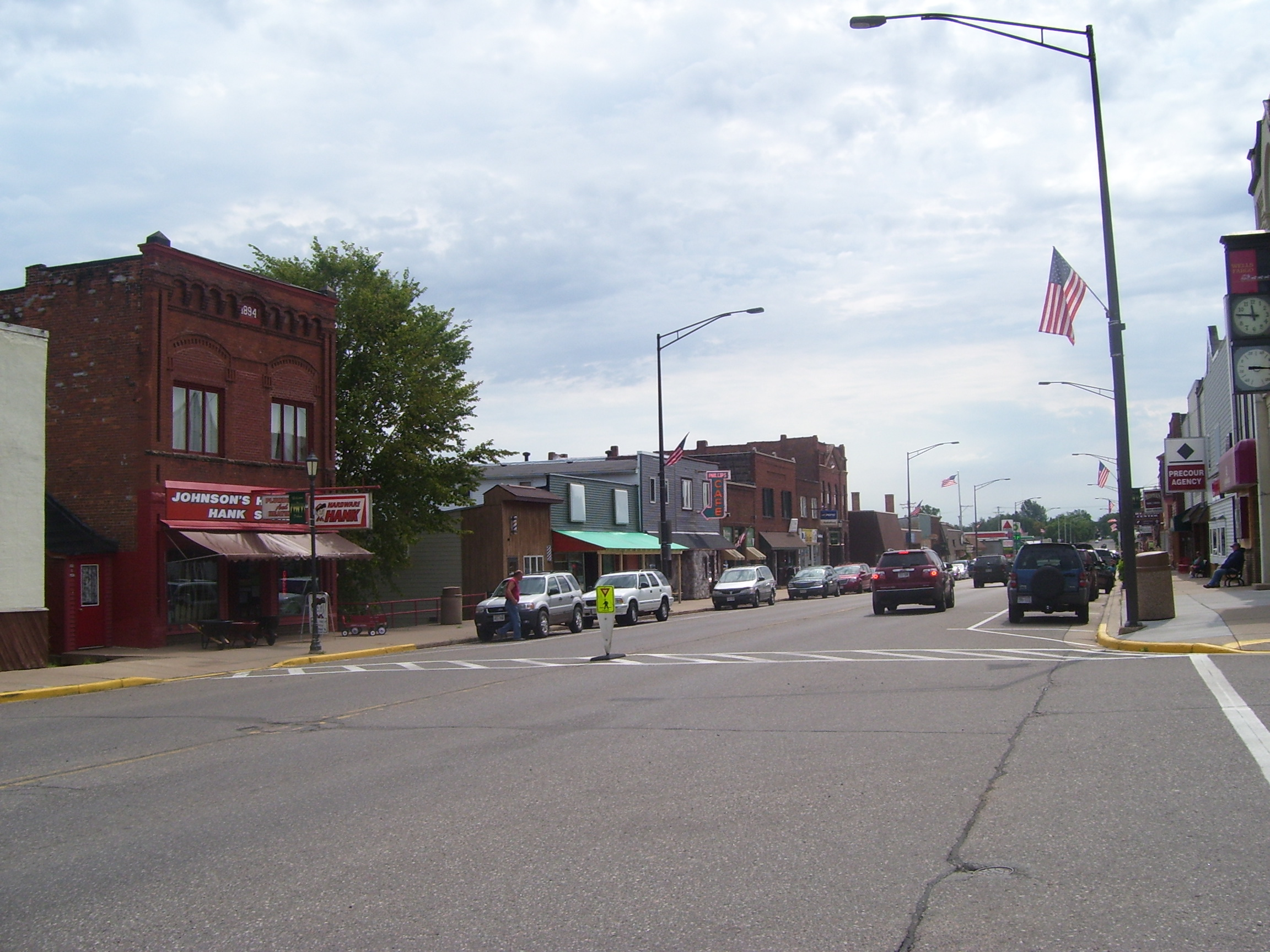
Phillips, Wisconsin is located in Price County.

=== Cities ===
- Park Falls
- Phillips (county seat)

=== Villages ===
- Catawba
- Kennan
- Prentice

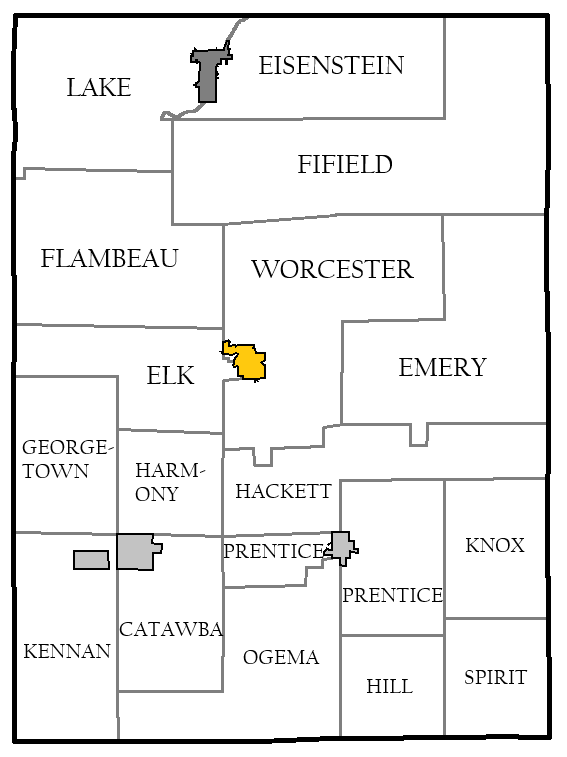
Towns of Price County

=== Towns ===
- Catawba
- Eisenstein
- Elk
- Emery
- Fifield
- Flambeau
- Georgetown
- Hackett
- Harmony
- Hill
- Kennan
- Knox
- Lake
- Ogema
- Prentice
- Spirit
- Worcester

=== Census-designated place ===
- Ogema

=== Unincorporated communities ===
- Cranberry Lake
- Clifford (partial)
- Brantwood
- Dover
- Fifield
- Lugerville
- Pennington
- Spirit
- Worcester

=== Ghost towns/neighborhoods ===
- Coolidge
- Kaiser
- Kennedy
- Knox Mills
- Sassen

== Politics ==
Price County was originally a Republican stronghold which became a swing county and bellwether beginning in the Depression years, voting for the nationwide winner in every election from 1928 to 1984 except for the very closely contested 1960 election. Recently, starting in 1988 it saw a Democratic trend through 2012 (with the exception of 2000). Several of these elections were particularly close; in 2004, Democrat John Kerry won the county by a narrow plurality of 37 votes. While the county swung strongly Democratic in 2008 to support Barack Obama, the best such performance since 1964, in 2012 Obama lost ground and only carried the county by 3 votes. In 2016 the county swung hard to the right in support of Donald Trump, who became the first Republican to carry it by over 60% since Warren G. Harding in 1920. Trump improved his margins in both 2020 and 2024.

United States presidential election results for Price County, Wisconsin
Year	Republican		Democratic		Third party(ies)	
Year	No.	%	No.	%	No.	%
1892	1,099	52.53%	876	41.87%	117	5.59%
1896	1,448	70.22%	550	26.67%	64	3.10%
1900	1,725	74.16%	529	22.74%	72	3.10%
1904	2,202	80.10%	401	14.59%	146	5.31%
1908	1,735	65.23%	609	22.89%	316	11.88%
1912	708	29.50%	662	27.58%	1,030	42.92%
1916	1,620	56.39%	1,049	36.51%	204	7.10%
1920	2,990	74.23%	551	13.68%	487	12.09%
1924	1,754	32.81%	323	6.04%	3,269	61.15%
1928	3,210	57.92%	2,223	40.11%	109	1.97%
1932	2,023	31.32%	4,114	63.69%	322	4.99%
1936	2,215	28.95%	5,098	66.62%	339	4.43%
1940	3,879	47.93%	4,042	49.94%	172	2.13%
1944	3,258	47.78%	3,515	51.55%	46	0.67%
1948	2,952	43.51%	3,373	49.71%	460	6.78%
1952	4,376	58.42%	3,048	40.69%	67	0.89%
1956	4,028	58.82%	2,778	40.57%	42	0.61%
1960	3,555	51.10%	3,382	48.61%	20	0.29%
1964	2,406	35.88%	4,289	63.97%	10	0.15%
1968	3,096	47.44%	2,794	42.81%	636	9.75%
1972	3,694	54.39%	2,831	41.68%	267	3.93%
1976	3,204	43.30%	4,028	54.44%	167	2.26%
1980	4,028	49.30%	3,595	44.00%	548	6.71%
1984	4,289	54.62%	3,479	44.31%	84	1.07%
1988	3,450	46.02%	3,987	53.18%	60	0.80%
1992	2,654	31.04%	3,575	41.81%	2,321	27.15%
1996	2,545	34.44%	3,523	47.67%	1,322	17.89%
2000	4,136	52.16%	3,413	43.04%	381	4.80%
2004	4,312	49.21%	4,349	49.63%	102	1.16%
2008	3,461	42.24%	4,559	55.64%	174	2.12%
2012	3,884	49.16%	3,887	49.20%	130	1.65%
2016	4,559	60.24%	2,667	35.24%	342	4.52%
2020	5,394	63.12%	3,032	35.48%	120	1.40%
2024	5,763	65.07%	3,005	33.93%	88	0.99%

== See also ==
- National Register of Historic Places listings in Price County, Wisconsin
