= Emery, Wisconsin =

- Town
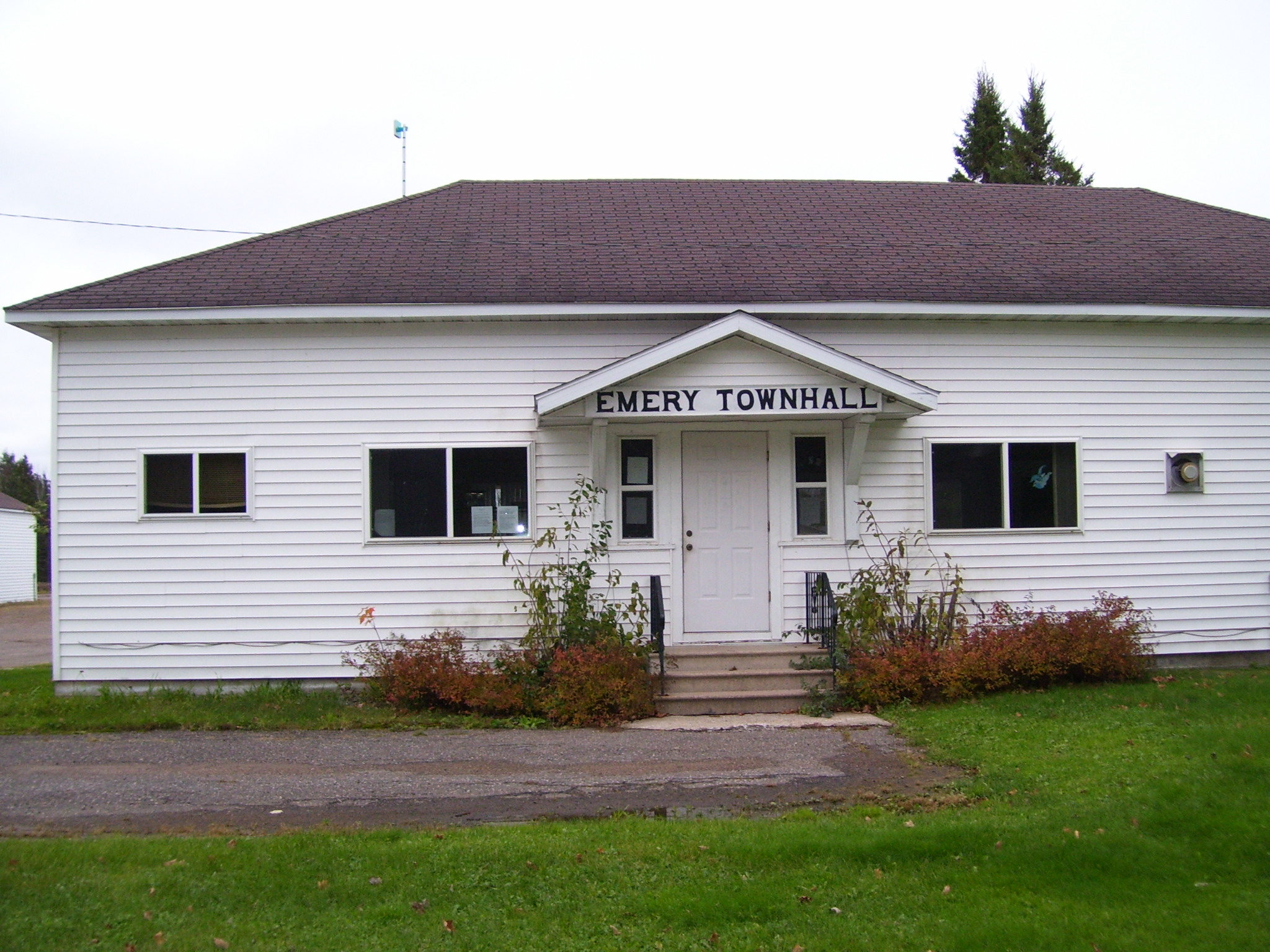
- The Emery Town Hall

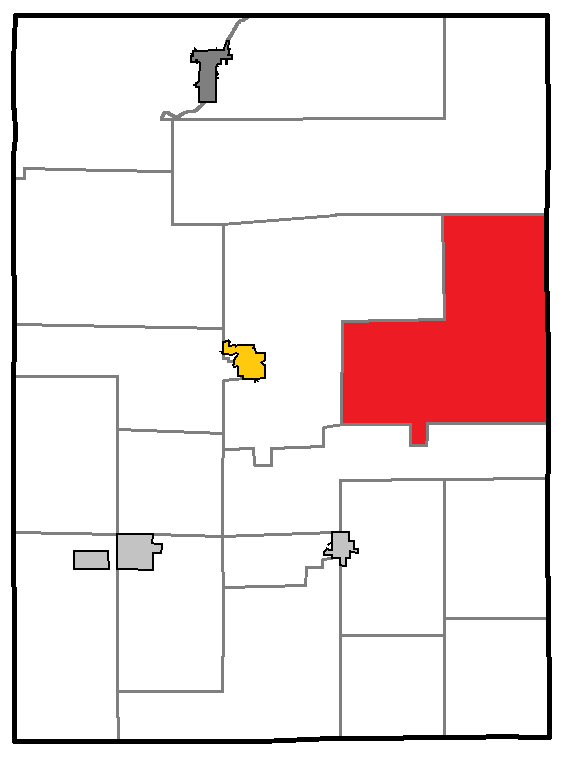
- Location of Emery, within Price County
- Coordinates: 45°42′0″N 90°10′38″W
- Country: United States
- State: Wisconsin
- County: Price

Area
  - Total: 108.2 sq mi (280.3 km^{2})
  - Land: 108.1 sq mi (280.0 km^{2})
  - Water: 0.077 sq mi (0.2 km^{2})
- Elevation: 1,650 ft (503 m)

Population (2020)
  - Total: 308
  - Density: 2.85/sq mi (1.10/km^{2})
- Time zone: UTC-6 (Central (CST))
  - Summer (DST): UTC-5 (CDT)
- Area codes: 715 & 534
- FIPS code: 55-23975
- GNIS feature ID: 1583164

Emery is a town in Price County, Wisconsin, United States. The population was 308 at the 2020 census. The unincorporated community of Dover is located in the town.

== Geography ==
According to the United States Census Bureau, the town has a total area of 108.2 square miles (280.3 km^{2}), of which 108.1 square miles (280.0 km^{2}) is land and 0.1 square miles (0.3 km^{2}) (0.09%) is water.

== Demographics ==
As of the census of 2000, there were 325 people, 125 households, and 93 families residing in the town. The population density was 3.0 people per square mile (1.2/km^{2}). There were 206 housing units at an average density of 1.9 per square mile (0.7/km^{2}). The racial makeup of the town was 98.46% White, 0.31% Native American, 0.62% from other races, and 0.62% from two or more races. Hispanic or Latino people of any race were 1.54% of the population.

There were 125 households, out of which 30.4% had children under the age of 18 living with them, 61.6% were married couples living together, 5.6% had a female householder with no husband present, and 25.6% were non-families. 21.6% of all households were made up of individuals, and 9.6% had someone living alone who was 65 years of age or older. The average household size was 2.60 and the average family size was 3.08.

In the town, the population was spread out, with 25.2% under the age of 18, 8.9% from 18 to 24, 24.3% from 25 to 44, 26.5% from 45 to 64, and 15.1% who were 65 years of age or older. The median age was 40 years. For every 100 females, there were 119.6 males. For every 100 females age 18 and over, there were 115.0 males.

The median income for a household in the town was $39,250, and the median income for a family was $43,333. Males had a median income of $30,156 versus $25,833 for females. The per capita income for the town was $17,100. About 2.1% of families and 5.1% of the population were below the poverty line, including 5.2% of those under age 18 and 10.4% of those age 65 or over.
