= Worcester, Wisconsin =

- Town
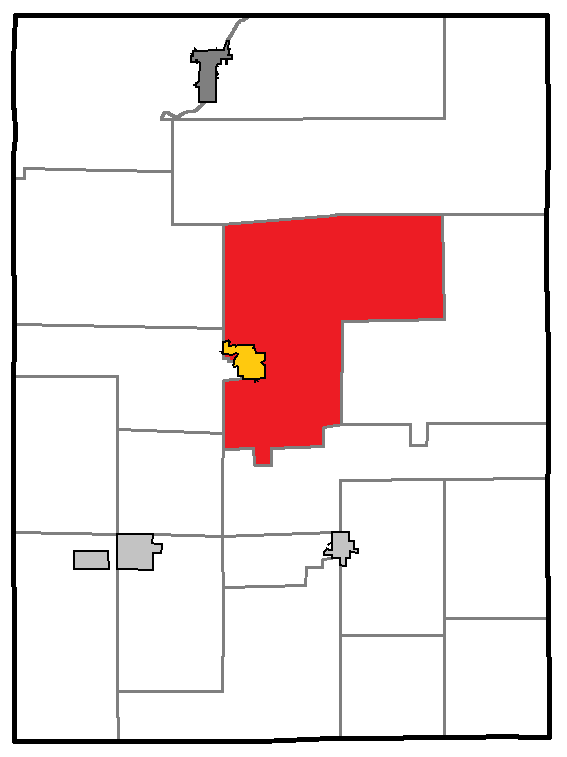
- Location of Worcester, within Price County
- Coordinates: 45°43′55″N 90°20′2″W
- Country: United States
- State: Wisconsin
- County: Price

Area
  - Total: 121.0 sq mi (313.4 km^{2})
  - Land: 117.3 sq mi (303.8 km^{2})
  - Water: 3.7 sq mi (9.6 km^{2})
- Elevation: 1,483 ft (452 m)

Population (2020)
  - Total: 1,543
  - Density: 13.15/sq mi (5.079/km^{2})
- Time zone: UTC-6 (Central (CST))
  - Summer (DST): UTC-5 (CDT)
- Area codes: 715 & 534
- FIPS code: 55-89100
- GNIS feature ID: 1584482
- Website: https://www.townofworcester.com/

Worcester is a town in Price County, Wisconsin, United States. The population was 1,543 at the 2020 census. The unincorporated community of Cranberry Lake is located in the town.

== Geography ==
According to the United States Census Bureau, the town has a total area of 121.0 square miles (313.4 km^{2}), of which 117.3 square miles (303.8 km^{2}) is land and 3.7 square miles (9.6 km^{2}) (3.06%) is water.

== Demographics ==
As of the census of 2000, there were 1,711 people, 699 households, and 499 families residing in the town. The population density was 14.6 people per square mile (5.6/km^{2}). There were 1,220 housing units at an average density of 10.4 per square mile (4.0/km^{2}). The racial makeup of the town was 98.60% White, 0.06% African American, 0.64% Native American, 0.06% Asian, 0.23% from other races, and 0.41% from two or more races. Hispanic or Latino people of any race were 0.88% of the population.

There were 699 households, out of which 30.5% had children under the age of 18 living with them, 62.5% were married couples living together, 5.0% had a female householder with no husband present, and 28.5% were non-families. 24.9% of all households were made up of individuals, and 10.7% had someone living alone who was 65 years of age or older. The average household size was 2.45 and the average family size was 2.94.

In the town, the population was spread out, with 24.8% under the age of 18, 4.6% from 18 to 24, 28.6% from 25 to 44, 25.0% from 45 to 64, and 16.9% who were 65 years of age or older. The median age was 40 years. For every 100 females, there were 110.7 males. For every 100 females age 18 and over, there were 108.6 males.

The median income for a household in the town was $38,750, and the median income for a family was $43,833. Males had a median income of $32,454 versus $21,064 for females. The per capita income for the town was $17,982. About 2.8% of families and 4.3% of the population were below the poverty line, including 3.7% of those under age 18 and 8.1% of those age 65 or over.
