= Catawba, Wisconsin =

Catawba
- Village
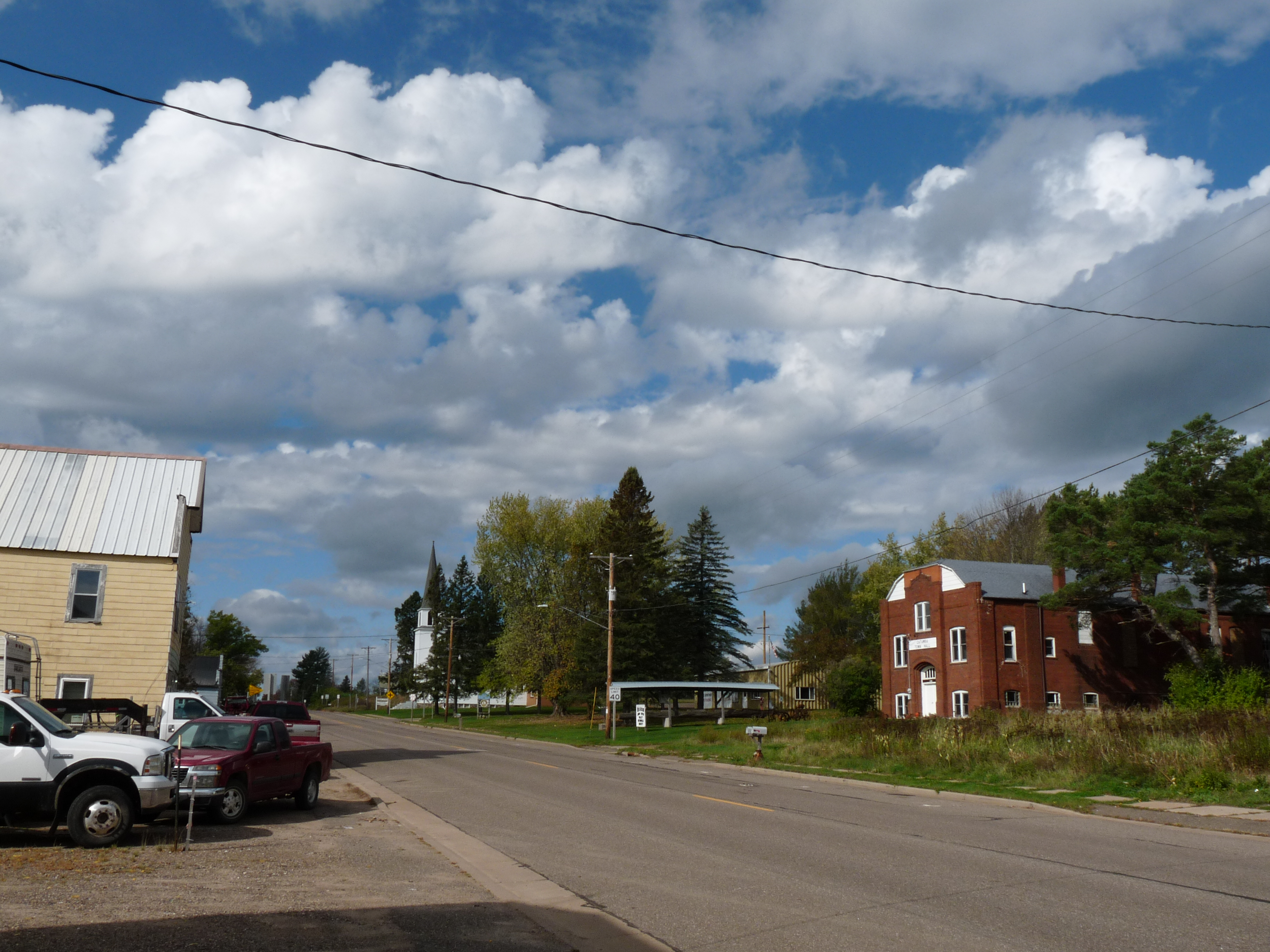
- Facing west on 8, with town hall/museum on right

- Location of Catawba in Price County, Wisconsin

- Location within the state of Wisconsin
- Coordinates: 45°32′9″N 90°31′50″W
- Country: United States
- State: Wisconsin
- County: Price

Area
  - Total: 4.44 sq mi (11.49 km^{2})
  - Land: 4.44 sq mi (11.49 km^{2})
  - Water: 0 sq mi (0.00 km^{2})

Population (2020)
  - Total: 141
  - Density: 31.8/sq mi (12.3/km^{2})
- Time zone: UTC-6 (Central (CST))
  - Summer (DST): UTC-5 (CDT)
- Area codes: 715 & 534
- FIPS code: 55-13175

Catawba is a village in Price County, Wisconsin, United States. The population was 141 at the 2020 census. The village is located within the Town of Catawba.

== Geography ==
Catawba is located at 45°32′9″N 90°31′49″W (45.535969, -90.530445).

According to the United States Census Bureau, the village has a total area of 4.46 square miles (11.55 km^{2}), all land.

== History ==
Before the railroad was built circa 1884, the area that would become Catawba was a forested wilderness cut only by rivers and Indian trails. The federal government surveyed that wilderness in 1847 and 1855. In the final years before the railroad, a little pine was logged along the river and some Swedish immigrants settled near where highway 86 crosses the south fork of the Jump River.

The name Catawba is said to come from the wine - perhaps from a crew of railroad gandy dancers who overindulged on the stuff, or perhaps from local lumberjacks who partook at a saloon in Kennan.

With the railroad came more lumber camps, more settlers, and a sawmill. The first school was operating by 1892, expanded to two rooms in 1902. By 1902 Peter Hammer's Red Birch Lumber Company had a sawmill running. He and his wife Isabelle also operated the Commercial Hotel, which largely served men working in the lumber business. Hammer also operated a company store called the ACA store. Other early businesses included a lath mill, the Bendixon butcher shop, the Hamm's Brewing Company saloon and pool hall, Stevens' barber shop, Swanson's soda fountain, and Gruber's store and opera house. A Lutheran congregation was organized in 1903 - the cemetery around 1909. The Catholic church was built around 1908. The Catawba State Bank started in 1916.

The town hall was built in 1921 and the village incorporated in 1922. At some point Wisconsin Highway 14 joined the railroad passing through town. It was eventually upgraded to U.S. Route 8, and paved in 1949.

== Demographics ==
Historical population
Census	Pop.	Note	%±
1930	282		—
1940	290		2.8%
1950	233		−19.7%
1960	230		−1.3%
1970	215		−6.5%
1980	205		−4.7%
1990	178		−13.2%
2000	149		−16.3%
2010	110		−26.2%
2020	141		28.2%
U.S. Decennial Census

=== 2010 census ===
As of the census of 2010, there were 110 people, 60 households, and 31 families living in the village. The population density was 24.7 inhabitants per square mile (9.5/km^{2}). There were 78 housing units at an average density of 17.5 per square mile (6.8/km^{2}). The racial makeup of the village was 100.0% White. Hispanic or Latino people of any race were 0.9% of the population.

There were 60 households, of which 13.3% had children under the age of 18 living with them, 41.7% were married couples living together, 5.0% had a female householder with no husband present, 5.0% had a male householder with no wife present, and 48.3% were non-families. 41.7% of all households were made up of individuals, and 16.7% had someone living alone who was 65 years of age or older. The average household size was 1.83 and the average family size was 2.45.

The median age in the village was 52 years. 13.6% of residents were under the age of 18; 2.7% were between the ages of 18 and 24; 21% were from 25 to 44; 45.5% were from 45 to 64; and 17.3% were 65 years of age or older. The gender makeup of the village was 51.8% male and 48.2% female.

=== 2000 census ===
As of the census of 2000, there were 149 people, 68 households, and 48 families living in the village. The population density was 33.4 people per square mile (12.9/km^{2}). There were 79 housing units at an average density of 17.7 per square mile (6.8/km^{2}). The racial makeup of the village was 99.33% White, and 0.67% from two or more races. 38.1% were of German, 15.9% Irish, 7.1% Czech, 6.2% Norwegian and 5.3% Polish ancestry according to Census 2000.

There were 68 households, out of which 26.5% had children under the age of 18 living with them, 48.5% were married couples living together, 10.3% had a female householder with no husband present, and 29.4% were non-families. 26.5% of all households were made up of individuals, and 13.2% had someone living alone who was 65 years of age or older. The average household size was 2.19 and the average family size was 2.58.

In the village, the population was spread out, with 18.1% under the age of 18, 6.7% from 18 to 24, 28.9% from 25 to 44, 25.5% from 45 to 64, and 20.8% who were 65 years of age or older. The median age was 44 years. For every 100 females, there were 109.9 males. For every 100 females age 18 and over, there were 117.9 males.

The median income for a household in the village was $26,250, and the median income for a family was $28,125. Males had a median income of $29,063 versus $22,361 for females. The per capita income for the village was $18,319. There were 4.3% of families and 6.0% of the population living below the poverty line, including 12.0% of under eighteens and 5.4% of those over 64.
