= Georgetown, Price County, Wisconsin =

Georgetown, Wisconsin
- Town
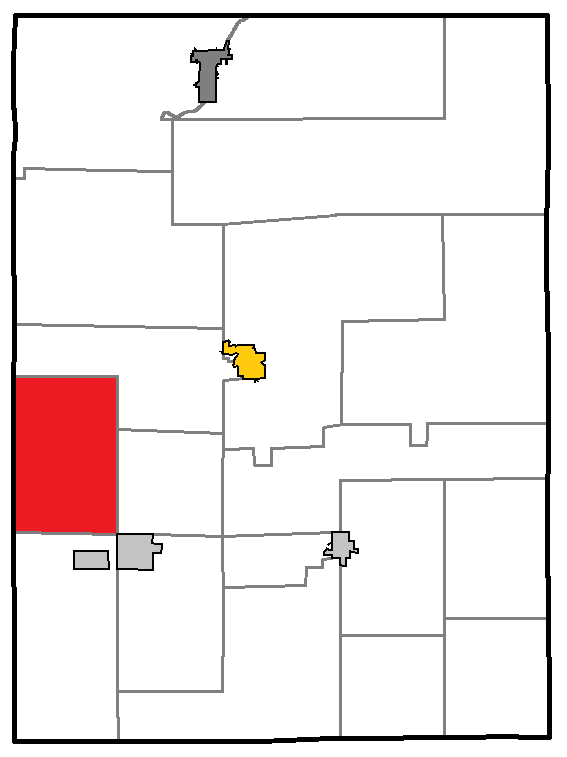
- Location of Georgetown, within Price County, Wisconsin
- Coordinates: 45°35′54″N 90°37′40″W
- Country: United States
- State: Wisconsin
- County: Price

Area
  - Total: 53.7 sq mi (139.2 km^{2})
  - Land: 53.6 sq mi (138.8 km^{2})
  - Water: 0.12 sq mi (0.3 km^{2})
- Elevation: 1,437 ft (438 m)

Population (2020)
  - Total: 172
  - Density: 3.21/sq mi (1.24/km^{2})
- Time zone: UTC-6 (Central (CST))
  - Summer (DST): UTC-5 (CDT)
- Area codes: 715 & 534
- FIPS code: 55-28750
- GNIS feature ID: 1583266

Georgetown is a town in Price County, Wisconsin, United States. The population was 172 at the 2020 census.

== Geography ==
According to the United States Census Bureau, the town has a total area of 53.7 square miles (139.2 km^{2}), of which 53.6 square miles (138.8 km^{2}) is land and 0.1 square miles (0.3 km^{2}) (0.24%) is water.

== Demographics ==
As of the census of 2000, there were 164 people, 65 households, and 44 families residing in the town. The population density was 3.1 people per square mile (1.2/km^{2}). There were 117 housing units at an average density of 2.2 per square mile (0.8/km^{2}). The racial makeup of the town was 98.17% White, 0.61% Asian, and 1.22% from two or more races.

There were 65 households, out of which 27.7% had children under the age of 18 living with them, 60.0% were married couples living together, 3.1% had a female householder with no husband present, and 32.3% were non-families. 23.1% of all households were made up of individuals, and 13.8% had someone living alone who was 65 years of age or older. The average household size was 2.52 and the average family size was 3.05.

In the town, the population was spread out, with 22.0% under the age of 18, 7.9% from 18 to 24, 20.7% from 25 to 44, 30.5% from 45 to 64, and 18.9% who were 65 years of age or older. The median age was 45 years. For every 100 females, there were 105.0 males. For every 100 females age 18 and over, there were 120.7 males.

The median income for a household in the town was $37,500, and the median income for a family was $47,083. Males had a median income of $31,667 versus $22,031 for females. The per capita income for the town was $14,222. About 17.9% of families and 23.3% of the population were below the poverty line, including 38.1% of those under the age of eighteen and 33.3% of those 65 or over.
