= Kennan, Wisconsin =

- Village
- Location of Kennan in Price County, Wisconsin
- Coordinates: 45°27′35″N 90°36′38″W
- Country: United States
- State: Wisconsin
- County: Price

Government
  - Village President: Jill Arndt

Area
  - Total: 1.98 sq mi (5.14 km^{2})
  - Land: 1.98 sq mi (5.14 km^{2})
  - Water: 0 sq mi (0.00 km^{2})
- Elevation: 1,332 ft (406 m)

Population (2020)
  - Total: 143
  - Density: 72.1/sq mi (27.8/km^{2})
- Time zone: UTC-6 (Central (CST))
  - Summer (DST): UTC-5 (CDT)
- Area codes: 715 & 534
- FIPS code: 55-39200
- GNIS feature ID: 1567405

Kennan is a village in Price County, Wisconsin, United States. The population was 143 at the 2020 census. The village is located within the Town of Kennan.

== Geography ==
Kennan is located at 45°31′50″N 90°35′17″W (45.53067, -90.588056).

According to the United States Census Bureau, the village has a total area of 1.99 square miles (5.15 km^{2}), all land.

== Demographics ==
Historical population
Census	Pop.	Note	%±
1910	184		—
1920	319		73.4%
1930	194		−39.2%
1940	256		32.0%
1950	194		−24.2%
1960	162		−16.5%
1970	167		3.1%
1980	194		16.2%
1990	169		−12.9%
2000	171		1.2%
2010	135		−21.1%
2020	143		5.9%
U.S. Decennial Census

=== 2010 census ===
As of the census of 2010, there were 135 people, 61 households, and 44 families living in the village. The population density was 67.8 inhabitants per square mile (26.2/km^{2}). There were 81 housing units at an average density of 40.7 per square mile (15.7/km^{2}). The racial makeup of the village was 100.0% White. Hispanic or Latino people of any race were 0.7% of the population.

There were 61 households, of which 16.4% had children under the age of 18 living with them, 54.1% were married couples living together, 8.2% had a female householder with no husband present, 9.8% had a male householder with no wife present, and 27.9% were non-families. 26.2% of all households were made up of individuals, and 13.1% had someone living alone who was 65 years of age or older. The average household size was 2.21 and the average family size was 2.64.

The median age in the village was 51.5 years. 14.1% of residents were under the age of 18; 8.1% were between the ages of 18 and 24; 18.5% were from 25 to 44; 37.8% were from 45 to 64; and 21.5% were 65 years of age or older. The gender makeup of the village was 50.4% male and 49.6% female.

=== 2000 census ===
As of the census of 2000, there were 171 people, 67 households, and 54 families living in the village. The population density was 86.7 people per square mile (33.5/km^{2}). There were 75 housing units at an average density of 38.0 per square mile (14.7/km^{2}). The racial makeup of the village was 100.00% White. 1.75% of the population were Hispanic or Latino of any race.

There were 67 households, out of which 31.3% had children under the age of 18 living with them, 64.2% were married couples living together, 7.5% had a female householder with no husband present, and 19.4% were non-families. 19.4% of all households were made up of individuals, and 9.0% had someone living alone who was 65 years of age or older. The average household size was 2.55 and the average family size was 2.93.

In the village, the population was spread out, with 24.0% under the age of 18, 7.0% from 18 to 24, 26.9% from 25 to 44, 25.1% from 45 to 64, and 17.0% who were 65 years of age or older. The median age was 38 years. For every 100 females, there were 111.1 males. For every 100 females age 18 and over, there were 124.1 males.

The median income for a household in the village was $41,786, and the median income for a family was $44,250. Males had a median income of $26,250 versus $23,000 for females. The per capita income for the village was $18,701. About 5.4% of families and 8.0% of the population were below the poverty line, including 16.7% of those under the age of eighteen and none of those 65 or over.
