= Harmony, Price County, Wisconsin =

Harmony, Wisconsin
- Town
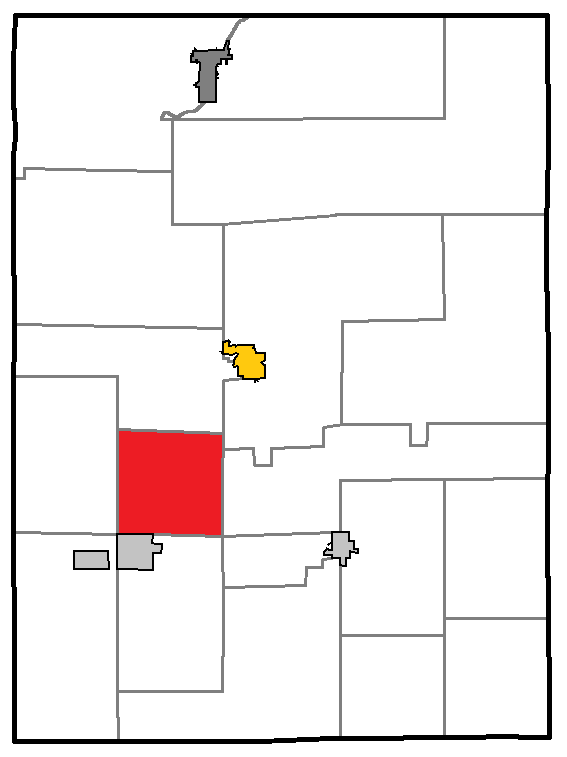
- Location of Harmony, within Price County, Wisconsin
- Coordinates: 45°35′17″N 90°28′40″W
- Country: United States
- State: Wisconsin
- County: Price

Area
  - Total: 35.6 sq mi (92.2 km^{2})
  - Land: 34.9 sq mi (90.5 km^{2})
  - Water: 0.66 sq mi (1.7 km^{2})
- Elevation: 1,506 ft (459 m)

Population (2020)
  - Total: 220
  - Density: 6.3/sq mi (2.4/km^{2})
- Time zone: UTC-6 (Central (CST))
  - Summer (DST): UTC-5 (CDT)
- Area codes: 715 & 534
- FIPS code: 55-32675
- GNIS feature ID: 1583350

Harmony is a town in Price County, Wisconsin, United States. The population was 220 at the 2020 census.

== Geography ==
According to the United States Census Bureau, the town has a total area of 35.6 square miles (92.2 km^{2}), of which 35.0 square miles (90.5 km^{2}) is land and 0.6 square miles (1.7 km^{2}) (1.80%) is water.

== Demographics ==
As of the census of 2000, there were 211 people, 96 households, and 67 families residing in the town. The population density was 6.0 people per square mile (2.3/km^{2}). There were 140 housing units at an average density of 4.0 per square mile (1.5/km^{2}). The racial makeup of the town was 99.05% White, 0.47% Native American, and 0.47% from two or more races.

There were 96 households, out of which 24.0% had children under the age of 18 living with them, 63.5% were married couples living together, 2.1% had a female householder with no husband present, and 30.2% were non-families. 26.0% of all households were made up of individuals, and 16.7% had someone living alone who was 65 years of age or older. The average household size was 2.20 and the average family size was 2.66.

In the town, the population was spread out, with 18.5% under the age of 18, 5.2% from 18 to 24, 21.8% from 25 to 44, 32.7% from 45 to 64, and 21.8% who were 65 years of age or older. The median age was 48 years. For every 100 females, there were 119.8 males. For every 100 females age 18 and over, there were 120.5 males.

The median income for a household in the town was $38,281, and the median income for a family was $39,219. Males had a median income of $36,250 versus $25,833 for females. The per capita income for the town was $20,953. None of the families and 2.8% of the population were living below the poverty line.
