= Wisconsin Highway 86 =

State highway in Wisconsin, United States

State Trunk Highway 86
- WIS 86 highlighted in red

Route information
- Maintained by WisDOT
- Length: 32.32 mi (52.01 km)

Major junctions
- West end: WIS 13 in Ogema
- East end: US 51 / CTH-D in Tomahawk

Location
- Country: United States
- State: Wisconsin
- Counties: Price, Lincoln

Highway system
- Wisconsin State Trunk Highway System; Interstate; US; State; Scenic; Rustic
← WIS 85	→ WIS 87

State Trunk Highway 86 (often called Highway 86, STH-86 or WIS 86) is a state highway in the U.S. state of Wisconsin. It runs east–west in north central Wisconsin from Ogema to Tomahawk.

== Route description ==
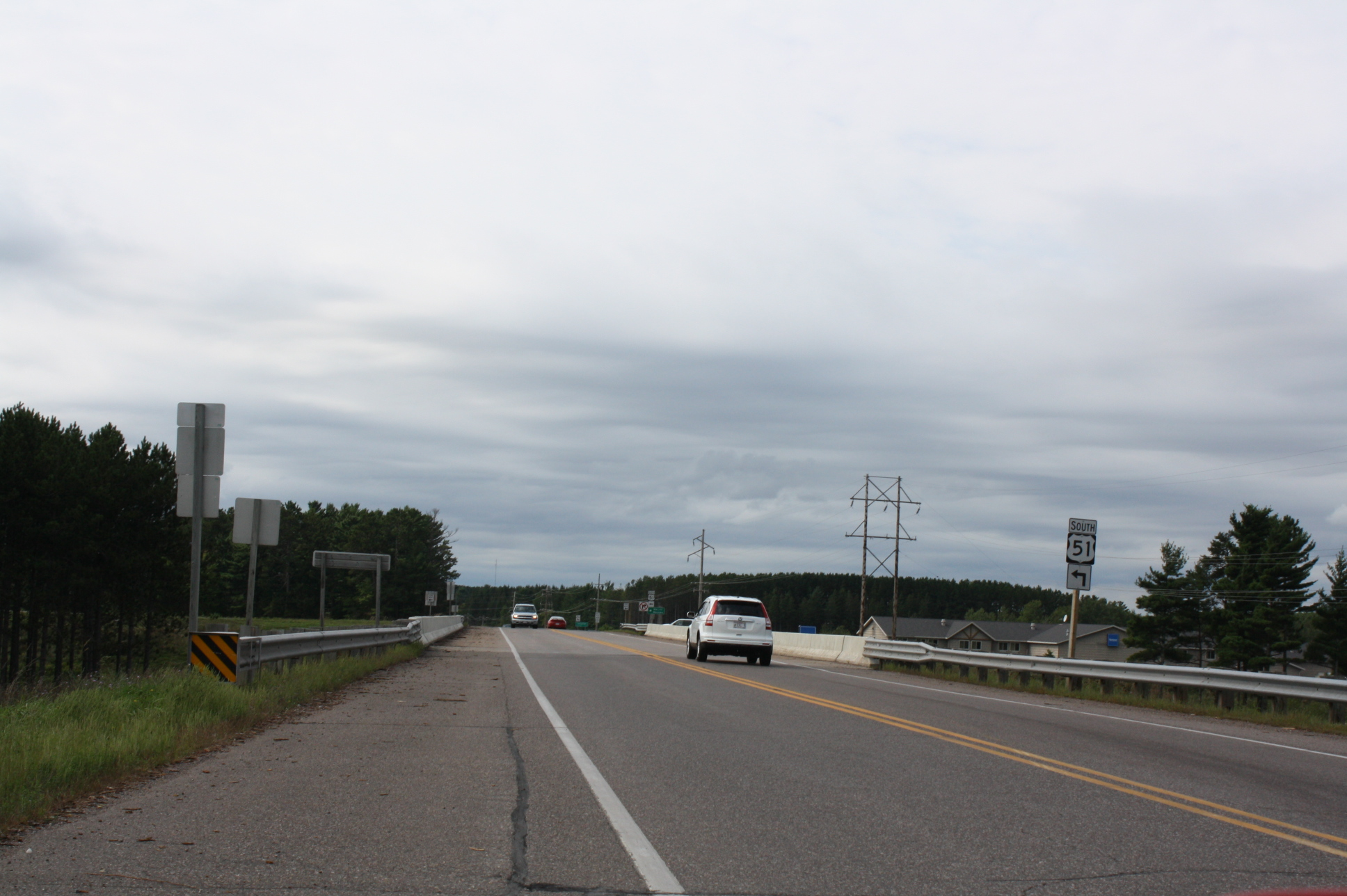
Looking west from the eastern terminus

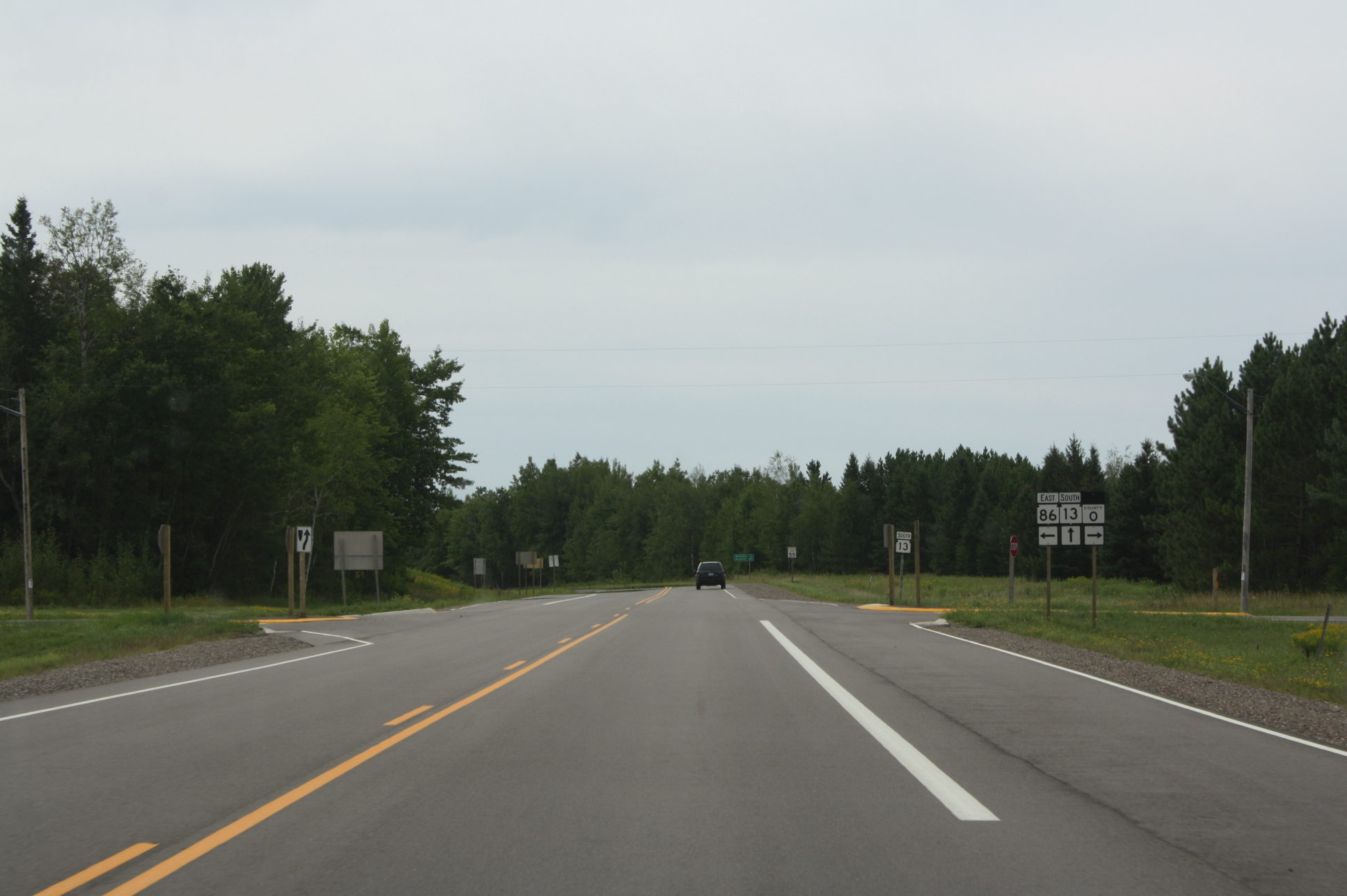
West terminus

The roadway transitions from County Trunk Highway O (CTH-O) to WIS 86 at the WIS 13 intersection west of Ogema. After crossing the Pine Line Trail in Ogema, WIS 86 then turns north and then east again. Continuing east, WIS 86 intersects WIS 102. Continuing further east, WIS 86 then crosses above the Wisconsin River. After the crossing, it then turns north towards downtown Tomahawk. In downtown, it first intersects CTH-S (former WIS 107) and then turns east once again. Further east, it then meets US Highway 51 (US 51) at a diamond interchange. At this point, WIS 86 ends there, and the roadway continues east as CTH-D.

== History ==
Initially, in 1919, WIS 86 was formed to travel along present-day WIS 73 from WIS 18 (now US 10) in Neillsville to WIS 16 (later WIS 29, now CTH-X) in Withee. This routing was eventually relocated in 1924 after WIS 73 extended northwestward, superseding the old route in the process. On the new route, WIS 56 traveled from WIS 13 (now CTH-G) in Ogema to WIS 10 (now CTH-S) in Tomahawk.

In 1956, WIS 86 extended northwest along former CTH-A (now CTH-O) to US 8 east of Catawba. In the fall of 1983, WIS 86 extended eastward towards the newly built US 51 Tomahawk bypass. By 1993, most of the 1956 northwestern extension was reverted to its county maintenance, replacing with CTH-O in the process. As a result, WIS 86 was truncated back to WIS 13, this time at the Ogema bypass.

== Major intersections ==
County	Location	mi	km	Destinations	Notes
Price	Ogema	0.00	0.00	WIS 13 – Prentice, Medford	
Price	Ogema	6.93	11.15	CTH-RR south – Rib Lake	Rustic Road; to Timm's Hill County Park
Price	Spirit	10.00	16.09	WIS 102 south – Rib Lake	
Lincoln	Tomahawk	29.38	47.28	CTH-S – Merrill	Formerly WIS 107
Lincoln	Tomahawk	32.32	52.01	US 51 – Merrill, Minocqua, Wausau; CTH-D	Roadway continues as CTH-D
1.000 mi = 1.609 km; 1.000 km = 0.621 mi
