= Hackett, Wisconsin =

- Town
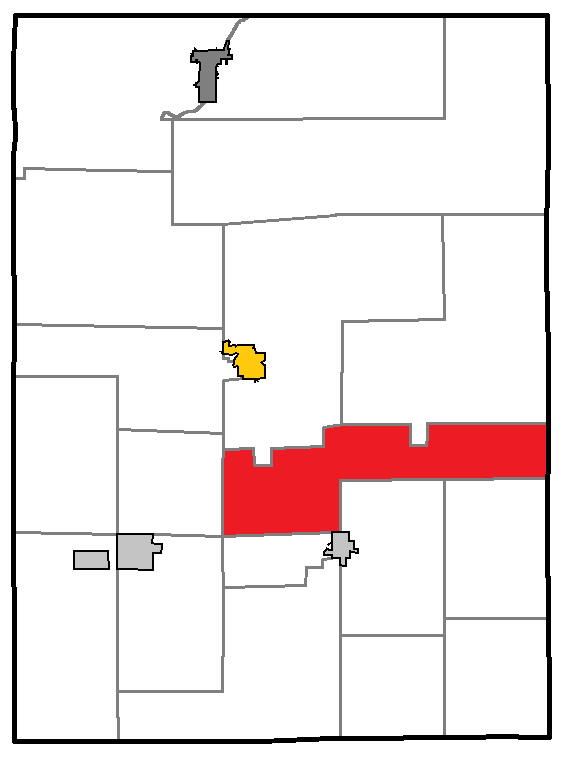
- Location of Hackett, within Price County
- Coordinates: 45°36′14″N 90°18′7″W
- Country: United States
- State: Wisconsin
- County: Price

Area
  - Total: 70.9 sq mi (183.6 km^{2})
  - Land: 69.5 sq mi (180.1 km^{2})
  - Water: 1.4 sq mi (3.6 km^{2})
- Elevation: 1,568 ft (478 m)

Population (2020)
  - Total: 189
  - Density: 2.72/sq mi (1.05/km^{2})
- Time zone: UTC-6 (Central (CST))
  - Summer (DST): UTC-5 (CDT)
- Area codes: 715 & 534
- FIPS code: 55-31925
- GNIS feature ID: 1583333

Hackett is a town in Price County, Wisconsin, United States. The population was 189 at the 2020 census. The unincorporated community of Worcester is located in the town. The town was named for Ephraim L. Hackett, who owned lumber interests in the area.

== Geography ==
According to the United States Census Bureau, the town has a total area of 70.9 square miles (183.6 km^{2}), of which 69.5 square miles (180.1 km^{2}) is land and 1.4 square miles (3.6 km^{2}) (1.95%) is water.

== Demographics ==
As of the census of 2000, there were 202 people, 78 households, and 52 families residing in the town. The population density was 2.9 people per square mile (1.1/km^{2}). There were 110 housing units at an average density of 1.6 per square mile (0.6/km^{2}). The racial makeup of the town was 98.51% White, 0.99% Asian, and 0.50% from two or more races.

There were 78 households, out of which 30.8% had children under the age of 18 living with them, 59.0% were married couples living together, 3.8% had a female householder with no husband present, and 32.1% were non-families. 28.2% of all households were made up of individuals, and 17.9% had someone living alone who was 65 years of age or older. The average household size was 2.59 and the average family size was 3.25.

In the town, the population was spread out, with 27.2% under the age of 18, 5.4% from 18 to 24, 29.2% from 25 to 44, 17.8% from 45 to 64, and 20.3% who were 65 years of age or older. The median age was 41 years. For every 100 females, there were 106.1 males. For every 100 females age 18 and over, there were 104.2 males.

The median income for a household in the town was $30,625, and the median income for a family was $36,250. Males had a median income of $28,750 versus $25,938 for females. The per capita income for the town was $16,283. About 3.8% of families and 3.8% of the population were below the poverty line, including 7.7% of those under the age of eighteen and none of those 65 or over.
