= Catawba (town), Wisconsin =

Town in Price County, Wisconsin, US

Catawba, Wisconsin
- Town
- Town of Catawba
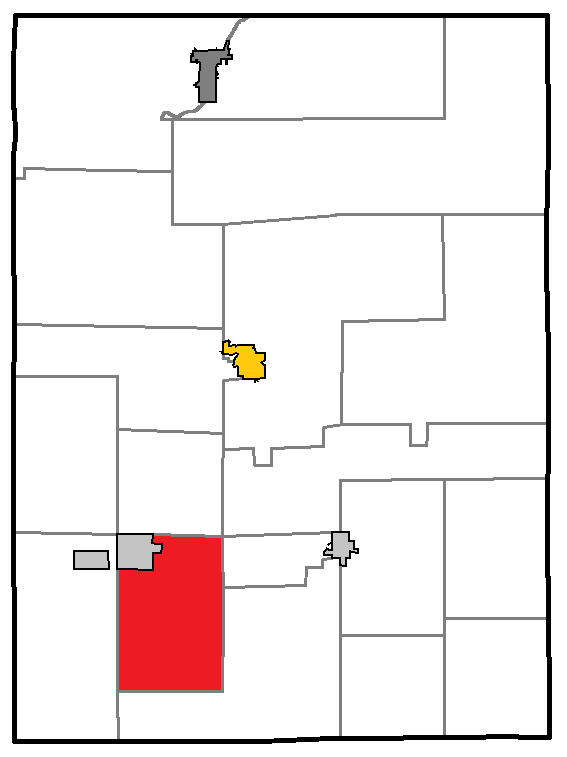
- Location of Catawba, within Price County
- Coordinates: 45°28′23″N 90°28′20″W
- Country: United States
- State: Wisconsin
- County: Price

Area
  - Total: 50.44 sq mi (130.6 km^{2})
  - Land: 50.42 sq mi (130.6 km^{2})
  - Water: 0.02 sq mi (0.052 km^{2})

Population (2020)
  - Total: 247
  - Density: 4.90/sq mi (1.89/km^{2})
- Time zone: UTC-6 (Central (CST))
  - Summer (DST): UTC-5 (CDT)
- Area code(s): 715 & 534
- GNIS feature ID: 1582932

Catawba is a town in Price County, Wisconsin, United States. The population was 247 at the 2020 census. The Village of Catawba is located within the town.

== Geography ==
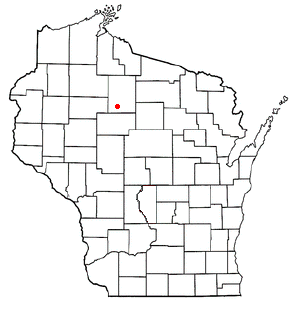
Location of Catawba (town), Wisconsin

According to the United States Census Bureau, the town has a total area of 50.0 square miles (129.5 km^{2}), of which 50.0 square miles (129.4 km^{2}) is land and 0.04 square miles (0.1 km^{2}) (0.04%) is water.

== History ==
Some of the earliest European Americans to walk the land that would become Catawba were the U.S. government's surveyors. In 1847 they surveyed the outlines of the 6-mile blocks on foot with chain and compass. Others came back in 1855 to survey all the section lines. When done, the deputy surveyor filed this general description of the northern six miles of what would become Catawba:

This Township contains numerous Tamarack W. Cedar and Alder Swamps all of which are unfit for cultivation. The Surface is generally level and the soil poor 2d rate. Timber is chiefly Birch Hemlock Sugar Lind and Elm also some Pine.

In 1858 another team of surveyors surveyed the section lines of the 6-mile square that is part of the south end of Catawba, and filed this general description:

This Township contains Several Swamp of conisderable extent. Tamarac Cedar and Spruce are the principal ones. These Swamps are generally unfit for cultivation or for Timber it being to Small for any purpose(?). The Surface is generally level some parts stony especially along the River; Soil mostly 2nd rate except on some of the maple Ridge, it is first rate. Timber Chiefly Hemlock, Birch, Maple, Pine, Tamarac and Cedar. There an extensive Windfall the Southern Portion of this Township. Timber mostly rotted away and grown up to second growth Poplar and Fir. There is a Stream of considerable extent flows through this Township entering near the North East corner and runs in a South Westerly and Westerly direction. It is a narrow Deep Stream and very rapid not very good for forming motive powers for mills in this Township. There are numerous Small stream running into this from swamps (?).

== Demographics ==
As of the census of 2000, there were 283 people, 109 households, and 75 families residing in the town. The population density was 5.7 people per square mile (2.2/km^{2}). There were 162 housing units at an average density of 3.2 per square mile (1.3/km^{2}). The racial makeup of the town was 98.59% White, 0.35% Black or African American, 0.35% Native American, 0.35% Pacific Islander, and 0.35% from two or more races. 0.35% of the population were Hispanic or Latino of any race. 48.9% were of German, 10.3% Polish, 9.4% Norwegian, 7.3% Dutch, 5.6% American and 5.2% Czech ancestry.

There were 109 households, out of which 32.1% had children under the age of 18 living with them, 57.8% were married couples living together, 3.7% had a female householder with no husband present, and 30.3% were non-families. 28.4% of all households were made up of individuals, and 9.2% had someone living alone who was 65 years of age or older. The average household size was 2.60 and the average family size was 3.14.

In the town, the population was spread out, with 29.0% under the age of 18, 4.6% from 18 to 24, 31.1% from 25 to 44, 22.3% from 45 to 64, and 13.1% who were 65 years of age or older. The median age was 36 years. For every 100 females, there were 109.6 males. For every 100 females age 18 and over, there were 109.4 males.

The median income for a household in the town was $33,571, and the median income for a family was $35,938. Males had a median income of $33,750 versus $18,906 for females. The per capita income for the town was $14,235. About 1.3% of families and 4.5% of the population were below the poverty line, including 4.8% of those under the age of 18 and 10.0% of those 65 or over.
