= National Register of Historic Places listings in Price County, Wisconsin =

Location of Price County in Wisconsin

This is a list of the National Register of Historic Places listings in Price County, Wisconsin. It is intended to provide a comprehensive listing of entries in the National Register of Historic Places that are located in Price County, Wisconsin. The locations of National Register properties for which the latitude and longitude coordinates are included below may be seen in a map.

There are 13 properties and districts listed on the National Register in the county. Another property was once listed but has been removed.

This National Park Service list is complete through NPS recent listings posted September 4, 2026.

== Current listings ==
	Name on the Register	Image	Date listed	Location	City or town	Description
1	Deadman Slough	Deadman Slough	August 20, 1993 (#93000750)	Address Restricted	Flambeau	Late Paleo-Indian campsite and workshop near the Flambeau River. Artifacts include points of Hixton quartzite, adzes and scrapers. Animal remains include deer and porcupine bones, turtle shells, and probable waterfowl bones. Site also contains middle Woodland remains.
2	Fifield Fire Lookout Tower	Fifield Fire Lookout Tower	July 3, 2007 (#07000668)	5 mi (8.0 km). E of Fifield, WI 70; 45°53′12″N 90°19′28″W	Fifield	100-foot galvanized steel fire tower built by the Wisconsin Conservation Commission in 1932, when wildfires scorched the cut-over. Lookouts from CCC Camp Riley Creek staffed the tower from around 1935 to 1941 and then the Forest Service until 1957.
3	Fifield Town Hall	Fifield Town Hall	February 17, 1978 (#78000339)	Pine St. and Flambeau Ave. 45°52′38″N 90°25′16″W	Fifield	This town hall was built in 1894 on the site of the previous hall, which burned in the Fifield fire of 1893. It was the center of community life, with offices, jail, courtroom, meeting room, social hall, and a balcony for speeches and public announcements. Now a museum.
4	Flambeau Paper Company Office Building	Flambeau Paper Company Office Building	September 12, 1985 (#85002331)	200 N. First Ave. 45°56′11″N 90°26′50″W	Park Falls	Neoclassical 2-story brick office building with 3-story clock tower, designed by Richard Philipp and built in 1925 and 1929. The building represents Park Falls' major industry for many years.
5	Albin Johnson Log House	Albin Johnson Log House	January 20, 1978 (#78000127)	W1316 State Hwy. 86; 45°27′17″N 90°06′16″W	Spirit	Typical Swedish-style log cabin built of pine, tamarack and hemlock in 1885 by immigrant Albin and his future uncle Amandus. Logs are cupped on top and bottom, with squared sides and dovetailed corner notches. Two rooms downstairs and a sleeping room up. Moved in 2003.
6	Matt Johnson Log House	Matt Johnson Log House	December 8, 1978 (#78000128)	S of Brantwood off U.S. 8; 45°31′45″N 90°07′20″W	Brantwood	Finnish-style log cabin with full dovetail joints, built in 1898 of hemlock, with two rooms downstairs and one up. Built by Finnish immigrants Matt Johnson and John Kivekoa, who worked at the Knox Brothers sawmill. A.k.a. Knox House.
7	Lidice Memorial	Lidice Memorial	April 19, 2006 (#06000301)	Sokol Park, Ash and Fifield Sts. 45°41′44″N 90°24′27″W	Phillips	This 1944 Modernist sculpture in a city with a large Czech-Slovak population commemorates the Nazis' 1942 destruction of Lidice, Czechoslovakia.
8	Park Falls Post Office	Park Falls Post Office	October 24, 2000 (#00001238)	109 First St. N 45°56′09″N 90°26′53″W	Park Falls	3-story Neoclassical red-brick-and-limestone office built by the PWA in 1936 to house the post office and the headquarters of the Chequamegon National Forest. The lobby contains a WPA mural by John Watrous entitled "Lumberjack Fight on the Flambeau River."
9	Phillips High School	Phillips High School	February 24, 1995 (#95000156)	300 Cherry St. 45°41′22″N 90°24′01″W	Phillips	Romanesque and eclectic-styled brick school designed by Henry Wildhagen and built in 1909 and expanded by the PWA in 1937.
10	Prentice Boy Scout Cabin		November 24, 2017 (#100001857)	1600 blk. of Washington St. 45°32′58″N 90°17′23″W	Prentice	Rustic-styled meeting hall with walls of small vertical logs, built in 1956.
11	Prentice Co-operative Creamery Company	Prentice Co-operative Creamery Company	September 12, 1985 (#85002329)	700 Main St. 45°32′48″N 90°17′26″W	Prentice	Built in 1906 as a hide house for the U.S. Leather Company, the building housed the Prentice Cooperative Creamery Company from 1915 into the 1940s.
12	Round Lake Logging Dam	Round Lake Logging Dam	September 17, 1981 (#81000055)	NE of Fifield; 45°55′33″N 90°04′45″W	Fifield	Log-sluicing and flushing dam built in 1878, carefully restored.
13	Wisconsin Concrete Park	Wisconsin Concrete Park	October 28, 2005 (#05001195)	WI 13 S. 45°40′15″N 90°23′19″W	Worcester	A garden of rustic sculptures, created between 1950 and 1964 by Fred Smith - lumberjack, barkeep, and self-taught artist.

== Formerly listed properties ==
	Name on the Register	Image	Date listed	Date removed	Location	City or town	Description
1	Bloom's Tavern, Store and House		March 7, 1985 (#85000490)	September 29, 2011	396 S. Avon Ave. 45°41′06″N 90°23′38″W	Phillips	Two buildings connected by boomtown fronts, started in 1895. Burned in May 2009. At that point it was "the oldest known family-operated tavern in northern Wisconsin."

== See also ==
- List of National Historic Landmarks in Wisconsin
- National Register of Historic Places listings in Wisconsin
- Listings in neighboring counties: Ashland, Iron, Lincoln, Oneida, Rusk, Sawyer, Taylor, Vilas
