= Leo Heikkinen =

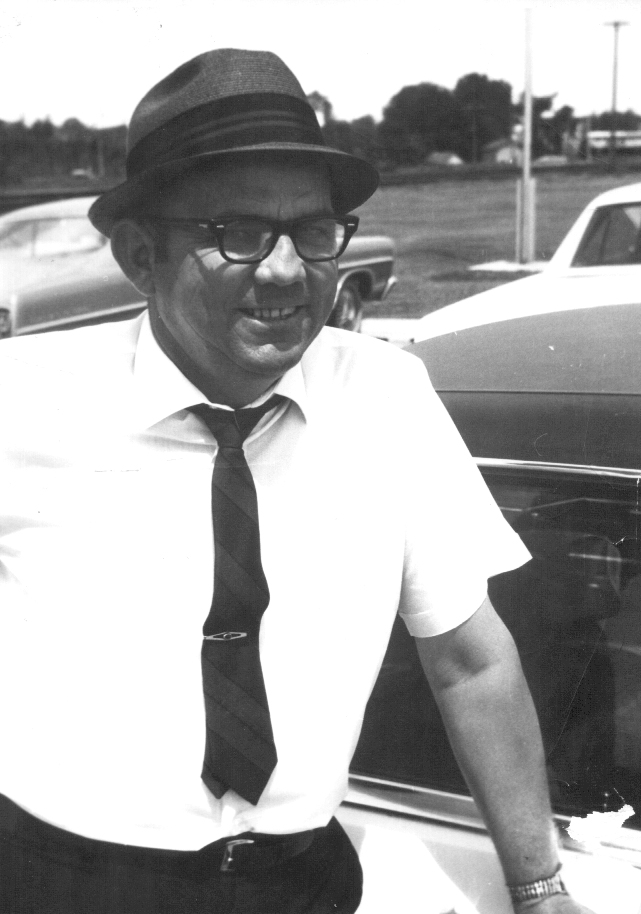
Leo Heikkinen in 1960

Leo Leonard Heikkinen (June 11, 1917 – September 10, 1999) was an American entrepreneur and millionaire who founded and owned numerous forestry production companies in Prentice, Wisconsin, including Prentice Hydraulics, Inc. (now a division of Caterpillar, Inc.) and Multitek North America, LLC. He is credited for inventing the "knuckleboom" hydraulic loader, an invention that propelled the Prentice loader to 51% of the worldwide market.

== Family life and education ==
Heikkinen was born the third child in a family of ten in Brantwood, Wisconsin. He graduated from Tripoli High School in 1935, married his wife Norma in 1941, worked in Milwaukee, Wisconsin for the Koehring Company, and returned to Price County in 1945 where he made the town of Prentice his home. Heikkinen had four children with his wife Norma. He died in September 1999 at the age of 82.

== Prentice Hydraulics, Inc. ==
In 1959, after running Heikkinen Machine Shop with his brothers for over a decade, Heikkinen incorporated Prentice Hydraulics. With Prentice Hydraulics, Heikkinen excelled due to selling his knuckleboom loader, a revolutionary design for pulpwood loaders that allowed a single operator to load a truck through a design that featured essentially a “yo-yo” and “claw” versus manually wrapping logs with a cable or worse, loading the logs by hand. The company began with 35 employees and grew to 340 employees and $9 million in sales prior to its sale to Omark Industries in 1967.

== Multitek North America, LLC ==
In 1970, Heikkinen founded Multitek North America, LLC which focused primarily on machines to process firewood, conveyors, wheel-crusher and attachments for skid steers. Multitek was in the Heikkinen family (first owned and operated by Leo and then by his three sons) until 2006 when it was sold to a Wisconsin-based investment group. Doug Kamps became the first president of Multitek North America, LLC under the new owners.

== Charity ==
Heikkinen was heavily involved in community projects around Prentice, Wisconsin. His donations included a community center, community park and pond, high school athletic fields, lights and equipment, a house for the town’s first doctor, land for the village’s first dental office. He also built and donated the Village of Prentice Municipal Golf Course and the Village of Prentice Airport. Heikkinen served as Village President for approximately 10 years while donating most of his pay back to the community.

== Awards ==
- Distinguished Finnish-American Award
- Admired Senior Citizen Award
- 1979 Wisconsin and Michigan Timber Producers Award
- Northeastern Loggers Association 1996 Outstanding Service to the Forest Industry Award
- Suomi College’s Distinguished Finnish American Award
- 1999 Wisconsin Business Hall of Fame
- Wisconsin Business Hall of Fame Eagle Award
- 2015 Price County Economic Development Association’s Lifetime Achievement Award
