= Barbara Anne Davis =

American baseball player

- Born: October 9, 1930; Fifield, Wisconsin, U.S.
- Died: March 2, 2008 (aged 77); Lihue, Hawaii, U.S.

Teams
- Racine Belles (1949); Rockford Peaches (1949)

Career highlights and awards
- Women in Baseball – AAGPBL Permanent Display at Baseball Hall of Fame and Museum (since 1988)

Barbara Anne Davis (October 9, 1930 – March 2, 2008) was an American baseball player in the All-American Girls Professional Baseball League.

== Life ==
Davis was a member of the Racine Belles and Rockford Peaches clubs during the 1949 season. She played in the Chicago Girls Baseball League for the North Town Co-Eds team before joining the AAGPBL. Davis is also credited with having won an ice skating medal in Chicago and a bowling tournament in Los Angeles.

After baseball, Davis attended Los Angeles State College of Applied Arts and Sciences (now California State University, Los Angeles), where she earned a degree, and later graduated in medical technology from Los Angeles County General Hospital. Following graduation, Davis worked as supervisor in the immunology department of LAC+USC Medical Center, retiring after 25 years of service.

Afterwards, Davis moved to Lihue in Kauaʻi County, Hawaii, where she directed educational travel tours programs for the Kilauea Lighthouse and Wild Life Refuge, the National Tropical Botanical Garden, and Na 'Aina Kai Botanical Gardens and Sculptural Park. At the same time, Davis volunteered for the American Red Cross and was a docent at the Kauaʻi Museum.

The All-American Girls Professional Baseball League folded in 1954, but there is now a permanent display at the Baseball Hall of Fame and Museum at Cooperstown, New York since November 5, 1988 that honors those who were part of the league. Davis, along with the rest of the league's girls and staff, is included at the display/exhibit.

Davis died in 2008 at her home of Lihue, Hawaii at the age of 77, following a long illness.
