= Coolidge, Wisconsin =

- Ghost town
- Location within Wisconsin
- Coordinates: 45°48′42″N 90°24′29″W
- Country: United States
- State: Wisconsin
- County: Price
- Elevation: 1,503 ft (458 m)
- GNIS feature ID: 1840272

Coolidge is a ghost town in Price County, Wisconsin, United States. It was located in the town of Fifield near Coolidge Lake, 8 miles (13 km) north of Phillips. The town was marked on USGS maps as late as 1941 and is still marked on Wisconsin Department of Transportation maps.

== History ==
Coolidge was one of the first settlements in the Town of Fifield along the Wisconsin Central Railroad. The town was set up as a flag station for the railway in November 1886. It consisted of two stores, a boarding house, a post office, and a saw and planing mill. The latter was built by W. H. Coolidge in 1884.

When Boyington and Atwell of Stevens Point built their sawmill at the site known as Fifield, Coolidge had a population of 500. The mill operated until 1891 and had a pine cut of over 80,000,000 board feet.

According to Fifield: A History, by Douglas Severt, all that is left of Coolidge today is a pile of stone in the clearing that was once the company's vault. Near this stone pile stands a huge spreading lilac bush that blossoms every spring, as if in memorial to the past.

William Ehmke was born at Coolidge, and later became section boss on the Wisconsin Central, as was his father before him.
