= Fifield (community), Wisconsin =

Fifield, Wisconsin
- Unincorporated community
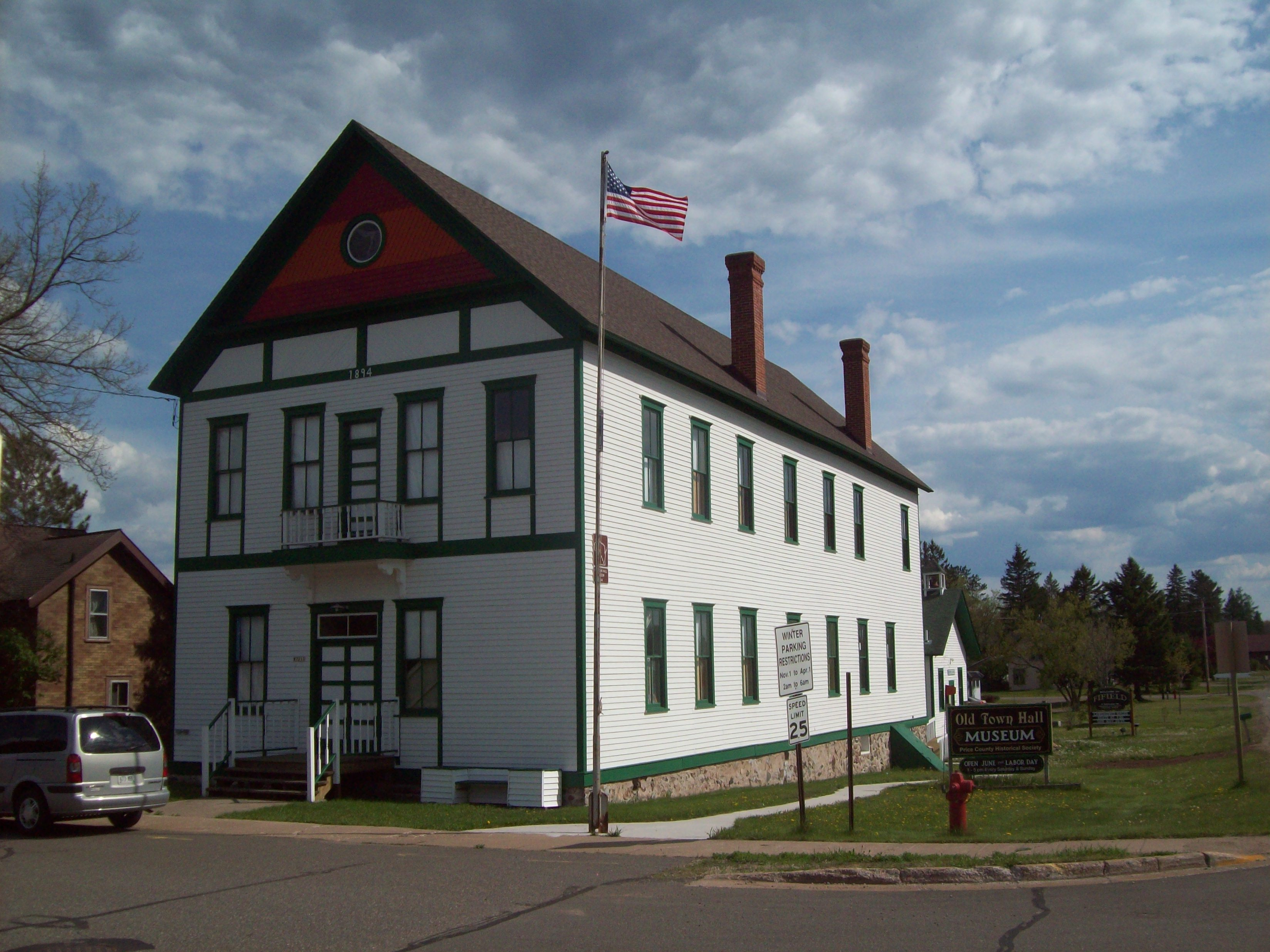
- The old Fifield Town Hall, now the home of the Price County Historical Society Museum

- Location within Wisconsin Location within the United States
- Coordinates: 45°52′47″N 90°25′20″W
- Country: United States
- State: Wisconsin
- County: Price
- Elevation: 1,489 ft (454 m)
- Time zone: UTC-6 (Central (CST))
  - Summer (DST): UTC-5 (CDT)
- ZIP code: 54524
- Area codes: 715 & 534
- GNIS feature ID: 1564931

Fifield is an unincorporated community located in the town of Fifield, Price County, Wisconsin, United States. Fifield is located at the junction of highways 13 and 70, 4 miles (6.4 km) south-southeast of Park Falls. Fifield has a post office with ZIP code 54524.

== Images ==
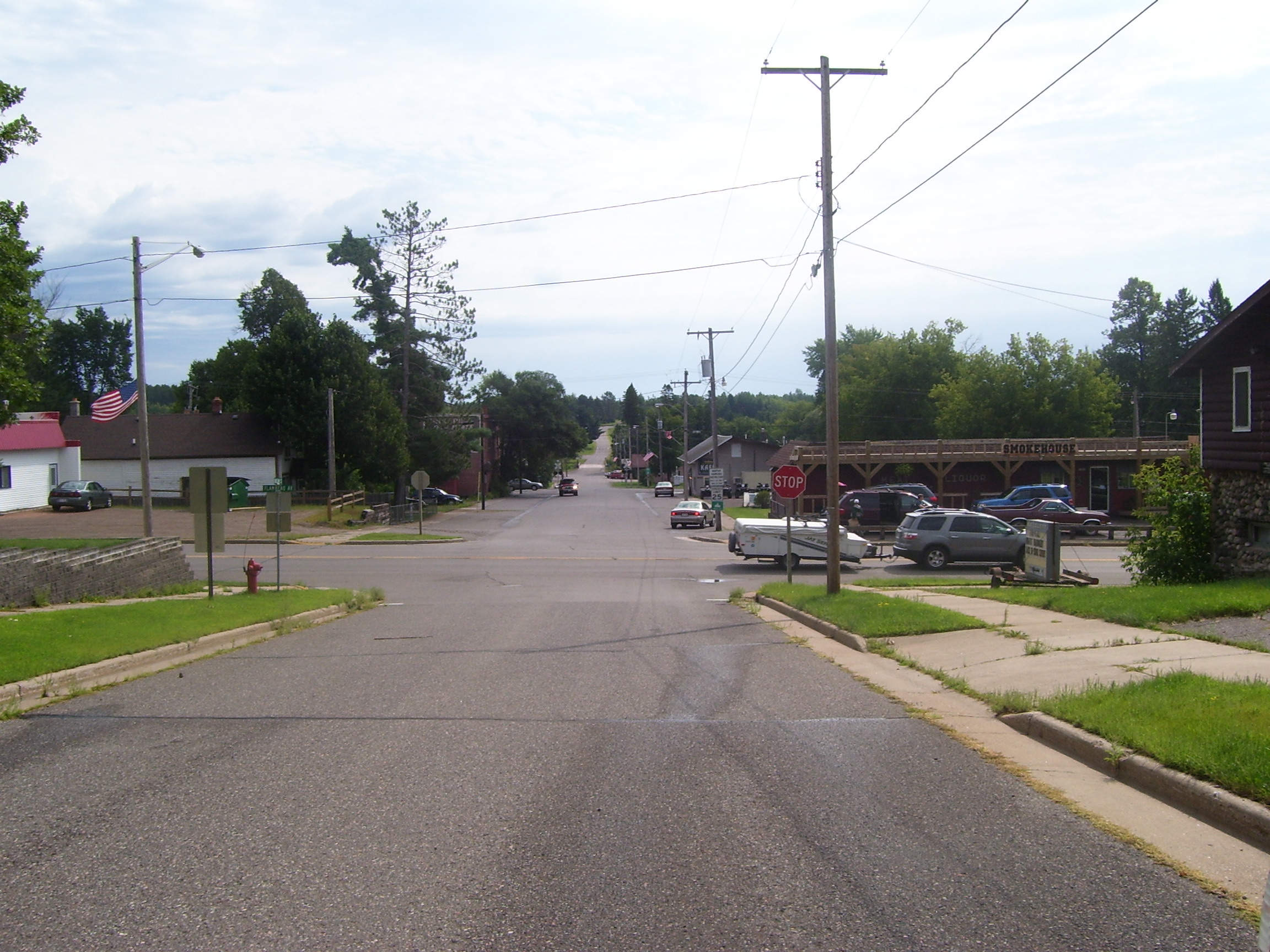
Balsam Street in Fifield, looking east

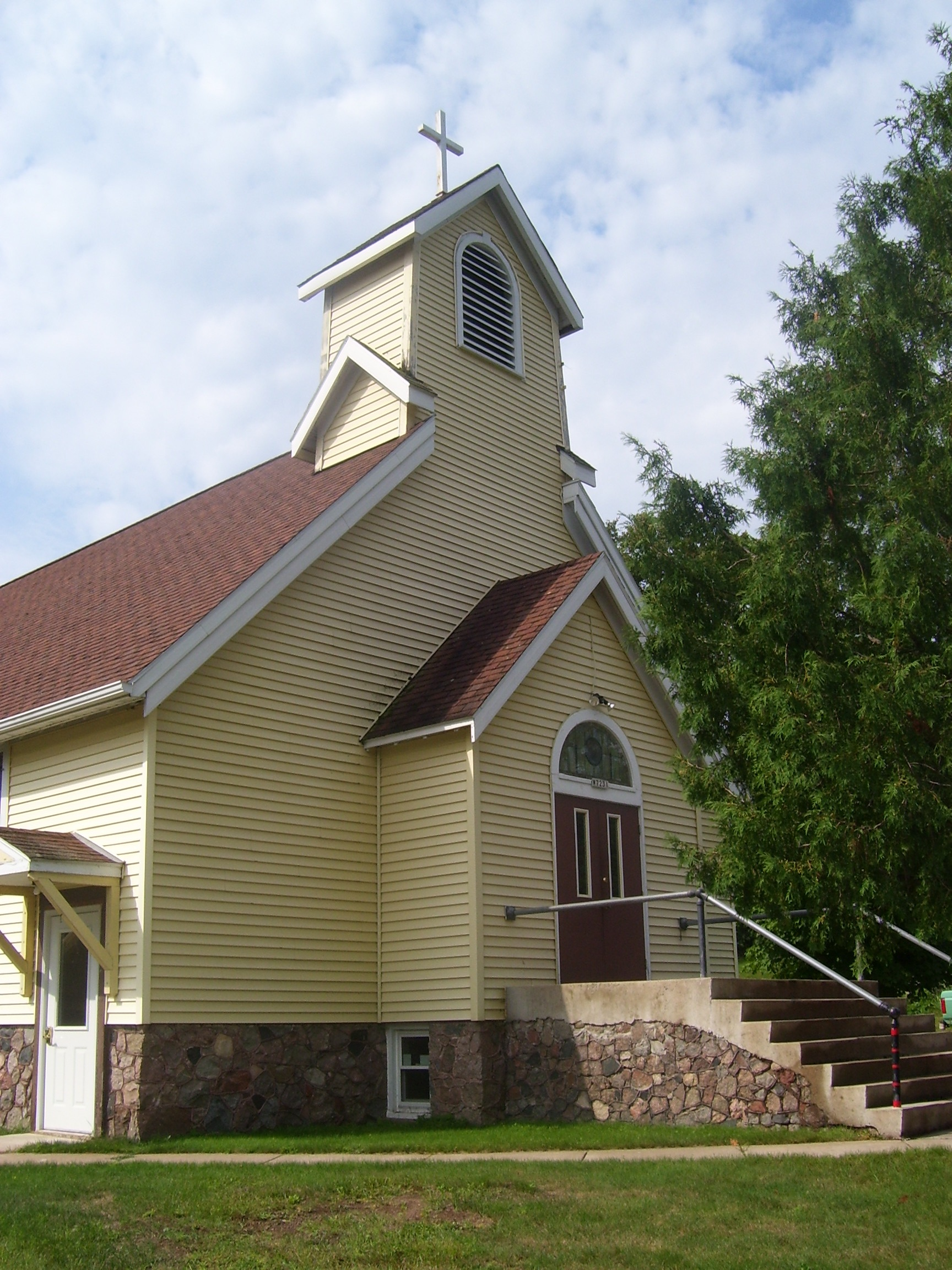
Saint Francis Catholic Church in Fifield

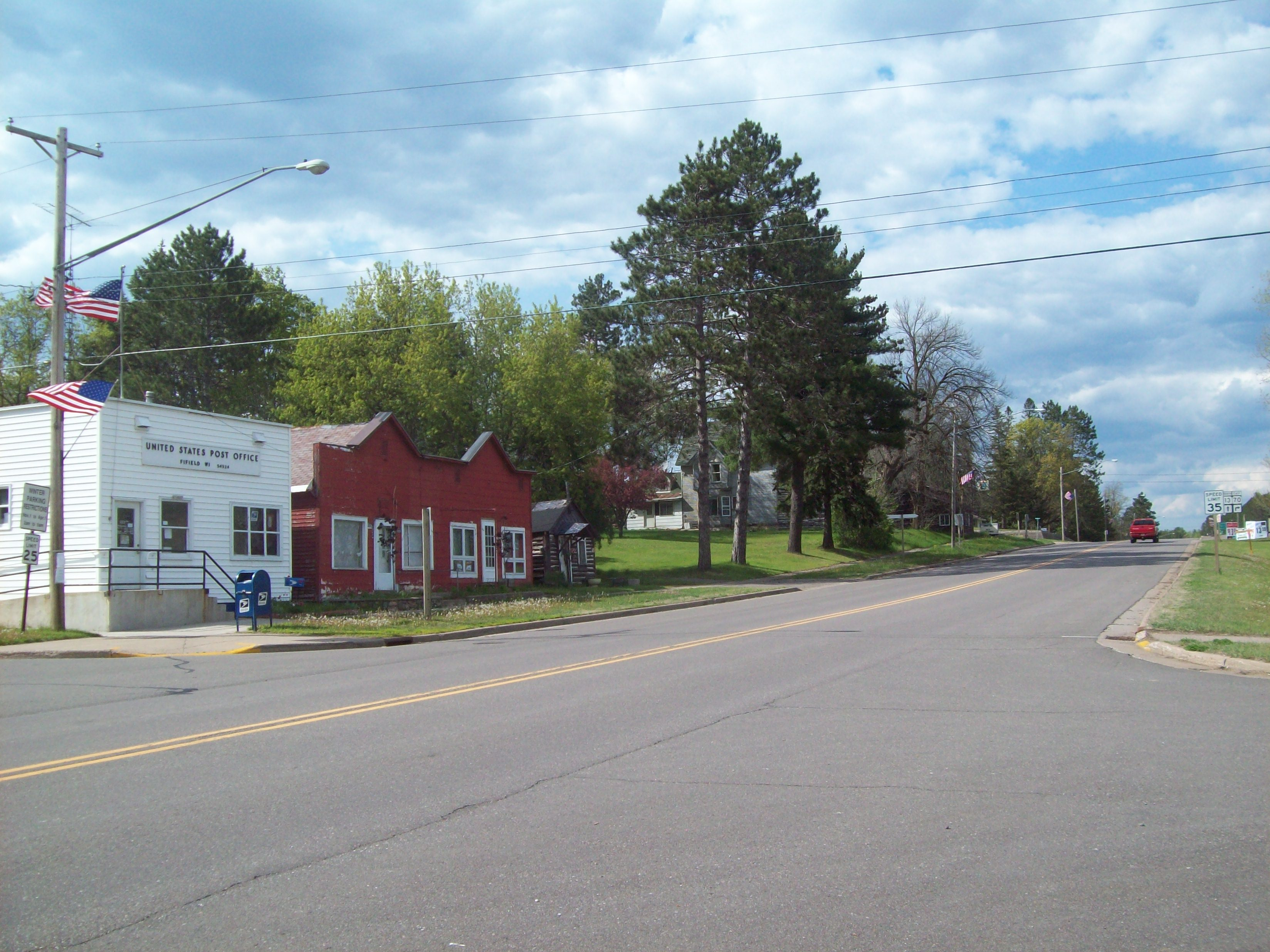
Highway 13 in Fifield

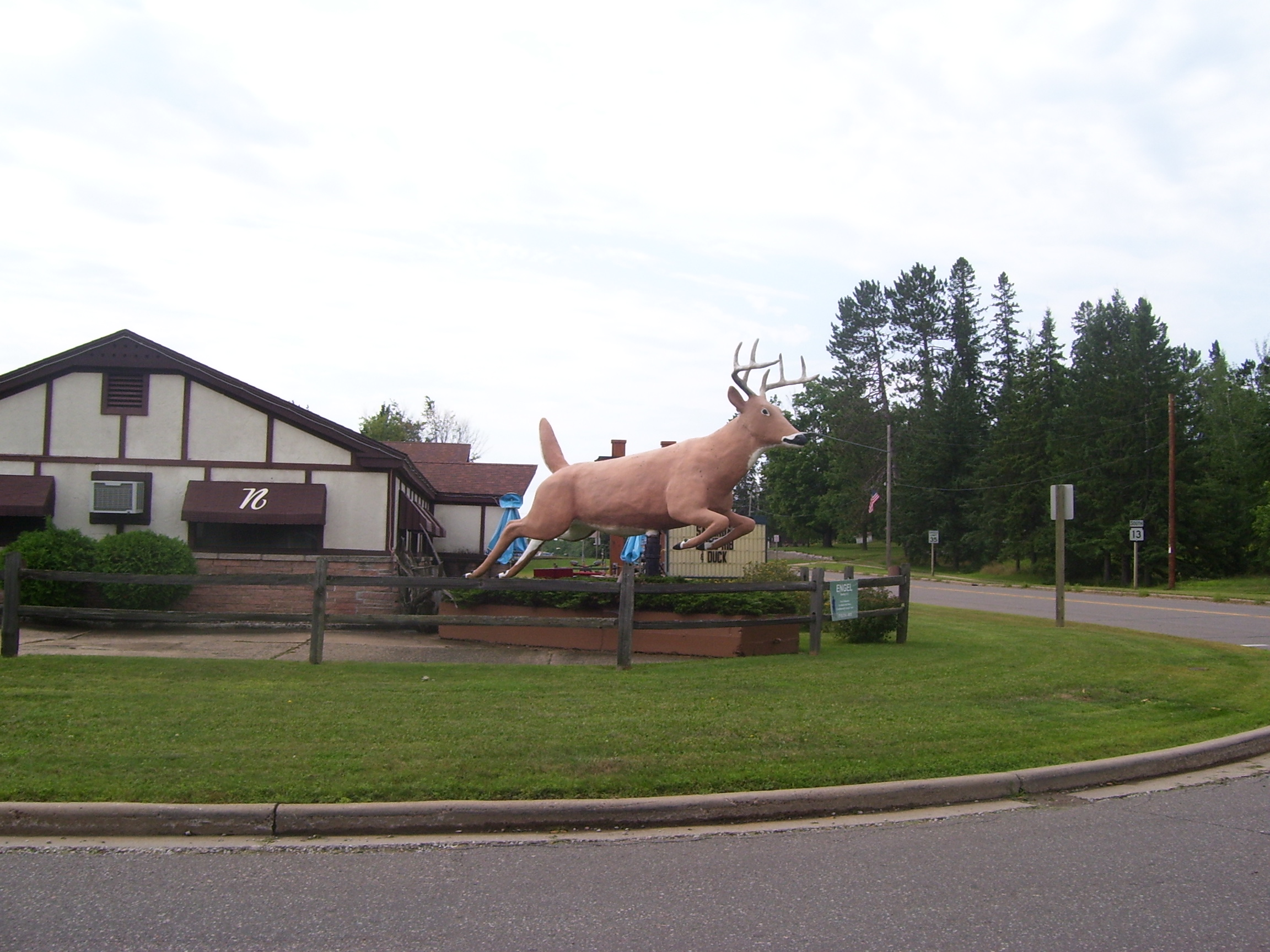
The large deer statue outside of a local restaurant

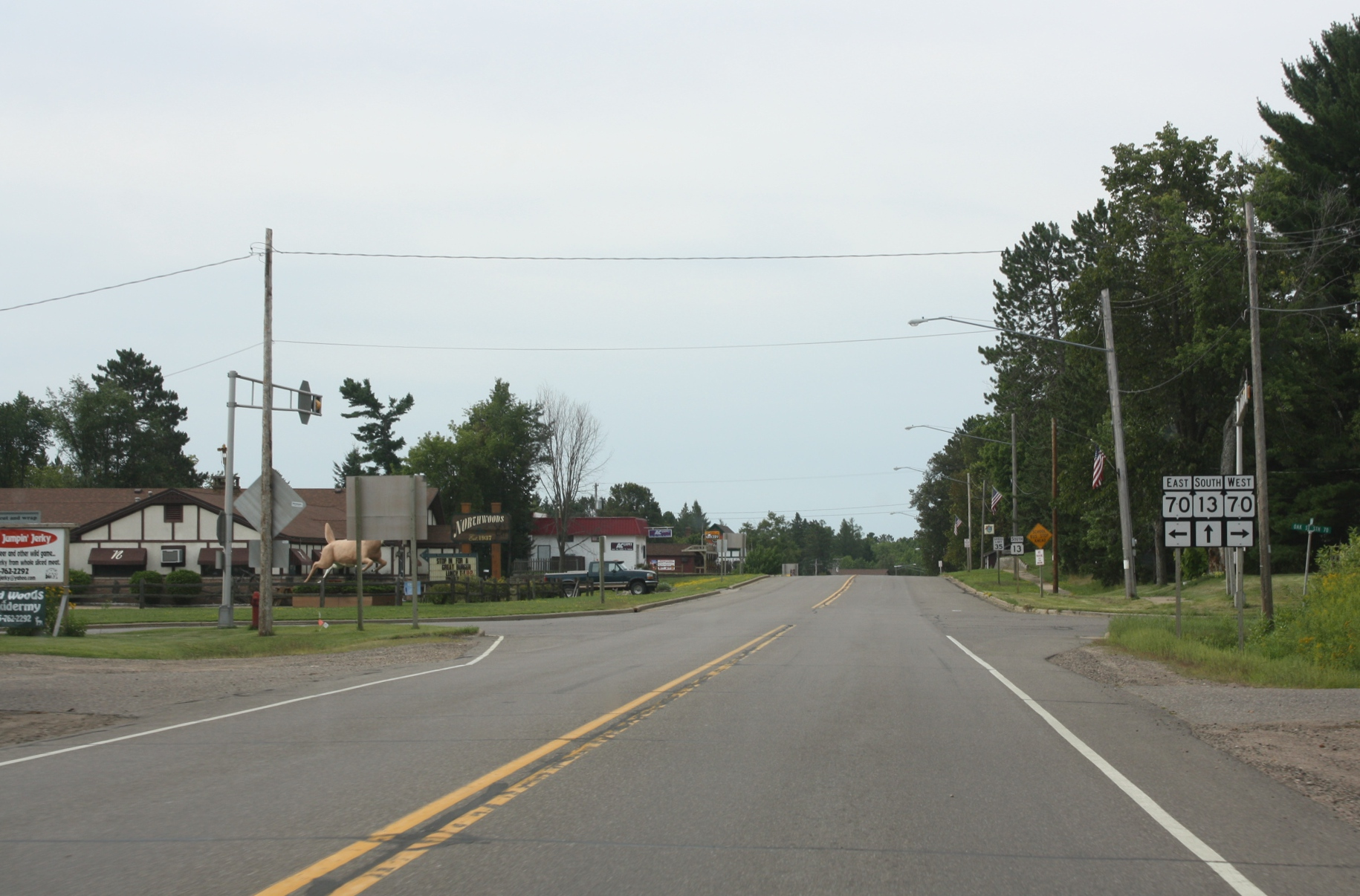
Looking south in Fifield

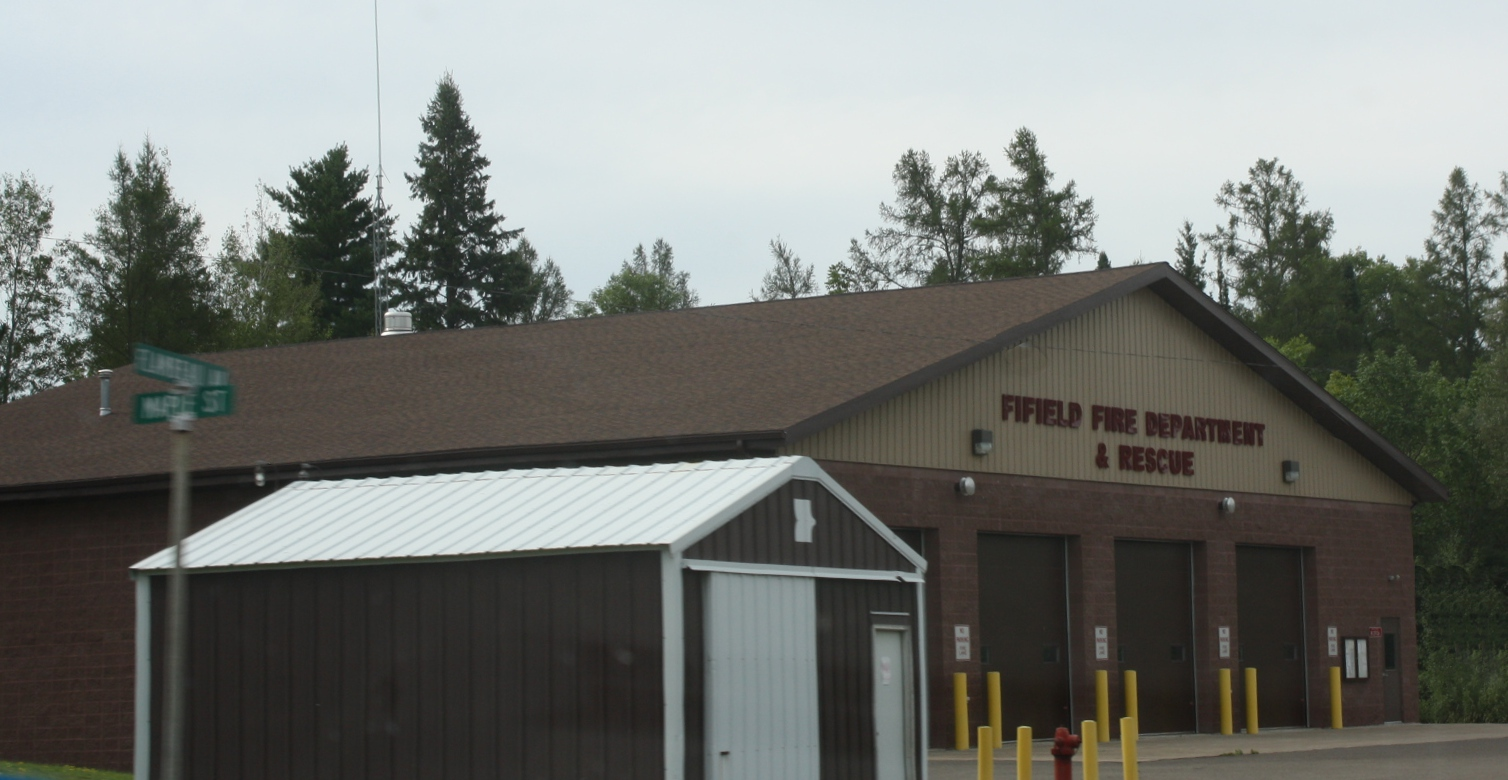
Fire and Rescue

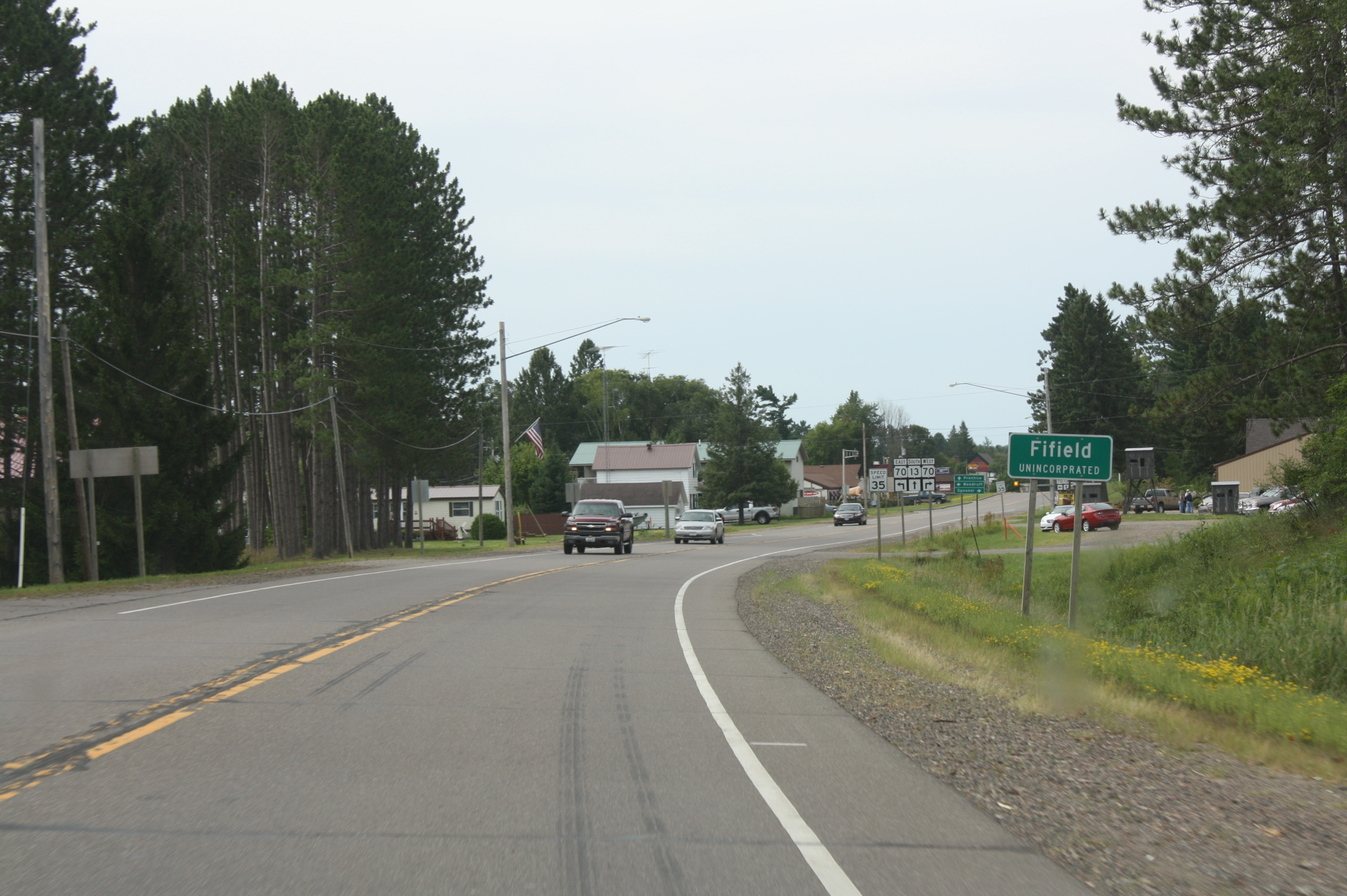
Sign on WIS 13
