= Prentice, Wisconsin =

Prentice
- Village
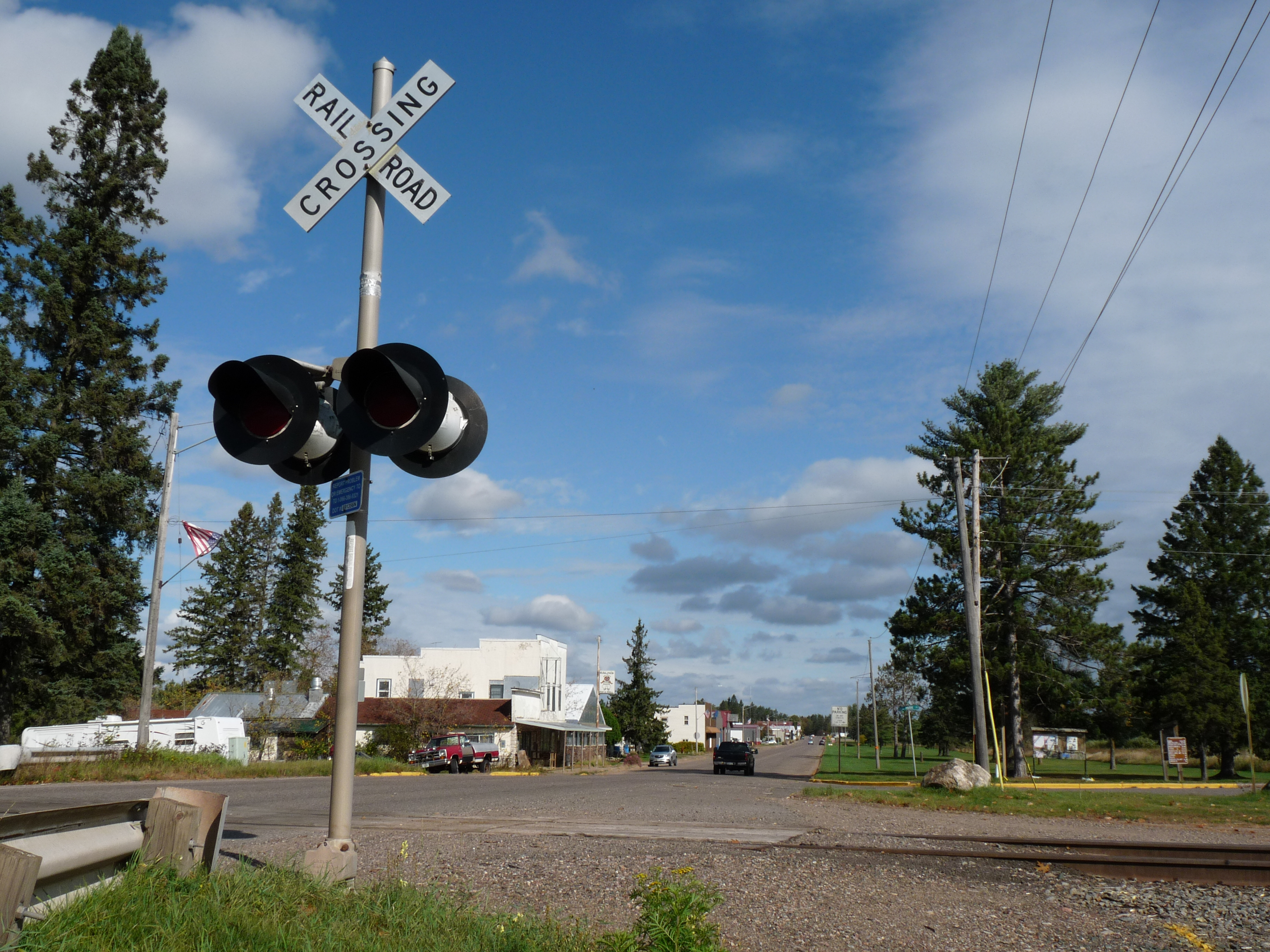
- At the railroad junction, looking north toward the downtown

- Location of Prentice in Price County, Wisconsin

- Location within Wisconsin Prentice (the United States)
- Coordinates: 45°31′20″N 90°16′54″W
- Country: United States
- State: Wisconsin
- County: Price

Area
  - Total: 2.04 sq mi (5.29 km^{2})
  - Land: 2.02 sq mi (5.23 km^{2})
  - Water: 0.023 sq mi (0.06 km^{2})
- Elevation: 1,539 ft (469 m)

Population (2020)
  - Total: 563
  - Density: 279/sq mi (108/km^{2})
- Time zone: UTC-6 (Central (CST))
  - Summer (DST): UTC-5 (CDT)
- Zip Code: 54556
- Area codes: 715 & 534
- FIPS code: 55-65325
- GNIS feature ID: 1571914
- Website: www.vil.prentice.wi.gov

Prentice is a village in Price County, Wisconsin, United States, near where Highway 13 crosses the Jump River. The population was 563 at the 2020 census. The village is located within the Town of Prentice.

== History ==
The area that would become Prentice was big woods until 1873, when the Wisconsin Central Railroad built its rail line up through the forest, heading from Stevens Point for Ashland. The railroad built stations at regular intervals and the crossing of the Jump River was the right distance from the previous station at Ogema. The railroad initially named its station at that crossing Malden.

In 1881 Alexander Prentice and George Greenman came north from Portage, scouting for a good place to build a lumber mill. They found plenty of timber around Malden station, and chose a mill site just south of where the railroad crossed the river. They were soon joined by workers who began building a sawmill and an 8-foot dam across the Jump. In 1882 they incorporated the Jump River Lumber Company and in September began sawing. Soon they were sawing 50,000 feet of lumber per day, which grew to 100,000 feet. The lumber company added a planing mill and drying shed soon after.

The lumber company considered calling their mill-town Jump River, but railroad officials pushed to call it Prentice, to honor the founder of the company. In 1882 the lumber company built the Jump River House - a 50-room hotel mainly for its employees which charged $2 per day. The company also built the Jump River Store, which was touted as the "finest in Price County" at the time, with 12 clerks selling staples, clothes, hats, shoes, furniture and stoves. The store also housed a dance hall for the community.

In 1884 a forest fire approaching from the west threatened the little settlement. The situation was so dire that some people buried their valuables and shuttled women and children to safety on the train to Ogema. That same year a village was platted near the depot and the mill, and a school was started - a two-room grade school. By 1887 the school had 50 students.

By 1889 the closest pine timber was running out, so Jump River Lumber built its own logging railroad spur to some prime timber called the Ward Tract about 5 miles southeast of town. The mill ran its own locomotive with 30 cars to haul logs from that tract. By this time the mill employed 450 men.

The deeds in the original town plat carried a restriction that the buyers could not operate businesses in town until 1890, so they would not compete with Jump River Lumber's store and hotel. In 1890 that restriction expired, and A.P. Morner opened a general store in town. The first newspaper, The Prentice Journal, started in 1891.

In the early 1890s Fayette Shaw opened a tannery on the west side of town. His family ran tanneries in Medford, Perkinstown, Rib Lake, Phillips, and other places. Hemlock bark was then used in the tanning process, and it was cheaper to transport hides to places near hemlock forests, even if remote, than to transport carloads of bark to the hides. With this addition, the population of Prentice swelled to 1,050. The Prentice tannery was considered the second largest of its kind in the U.S. - producing 200,000 hides of sole leather at its peak. It was a good thing it came along because the prime pine timber within reach was running out.

Around 1893 the Minneapolis, St. Paul and Sault Ste. Marie Railroad, heading from Minneapolis to Sault St. Marie, built a line across the south end of Prentice, connecting with the Wisconsin Central.

Prentice incorporated as a village in 1899. At the first meeting of the village board of directors, only one topic was discussed: sidewalks for the village. A volunteer fire department was in place by 1905, with two hose companies and one hook and ladder company.

In 1906 the tannery burned. The United States Leather Company had bought the operation from the Shaws at some point. In February a fire started in the dry loft. The alarm was sounded and the fire department rushed in and saved everything except the dry loft and the hide house. U.S. Leather quickly rebuilt, but four months later on the night before operation was to resume, another fire broke out, destroying more of the complex. U.S. Leather declined to rebuild again and the tannery closed permanently. Some who lost their jobs left, and others turned to farming.

As timber ran out, more and more settlers scratched farms out of the stump-lands left by logging in the surrounding country. Price County had 380 farms in 1890; by 1910 the number had grown to 1352. In 1903 the privately owned Prentice Creamery began buying milk from nearby farmers and selling butter. In 1915 a new Prentice Co-operative Creamery was formed owned by the farmers.

A fire in 1911 destroyed the post office, Kreuger's saloon, Lundberg's store, the Odd Fellows block, the Jump River Hotel, and other buildings. In early days some streets were lit in the evening by kerosene lamps. In 1912 the Ziegler brothers tried lighting with an electric plant powered by the Jump River, but it worked for only one night. In 1915 the Feeleys installed two electric generators, which powered lights - at night only, except when they blinked out.

== Geography ==
Prentice is located at 45°32′43″N 90°17′21″W (45.545499, -90.289413).

According to the United States Census Bureau, the village has a total area of 2.02 square miles (5.23 km^{2}), of which 1.99 square miles (5.15 km^{2}) is land and 0.03 square miles (0.08 km^{2}) is water.

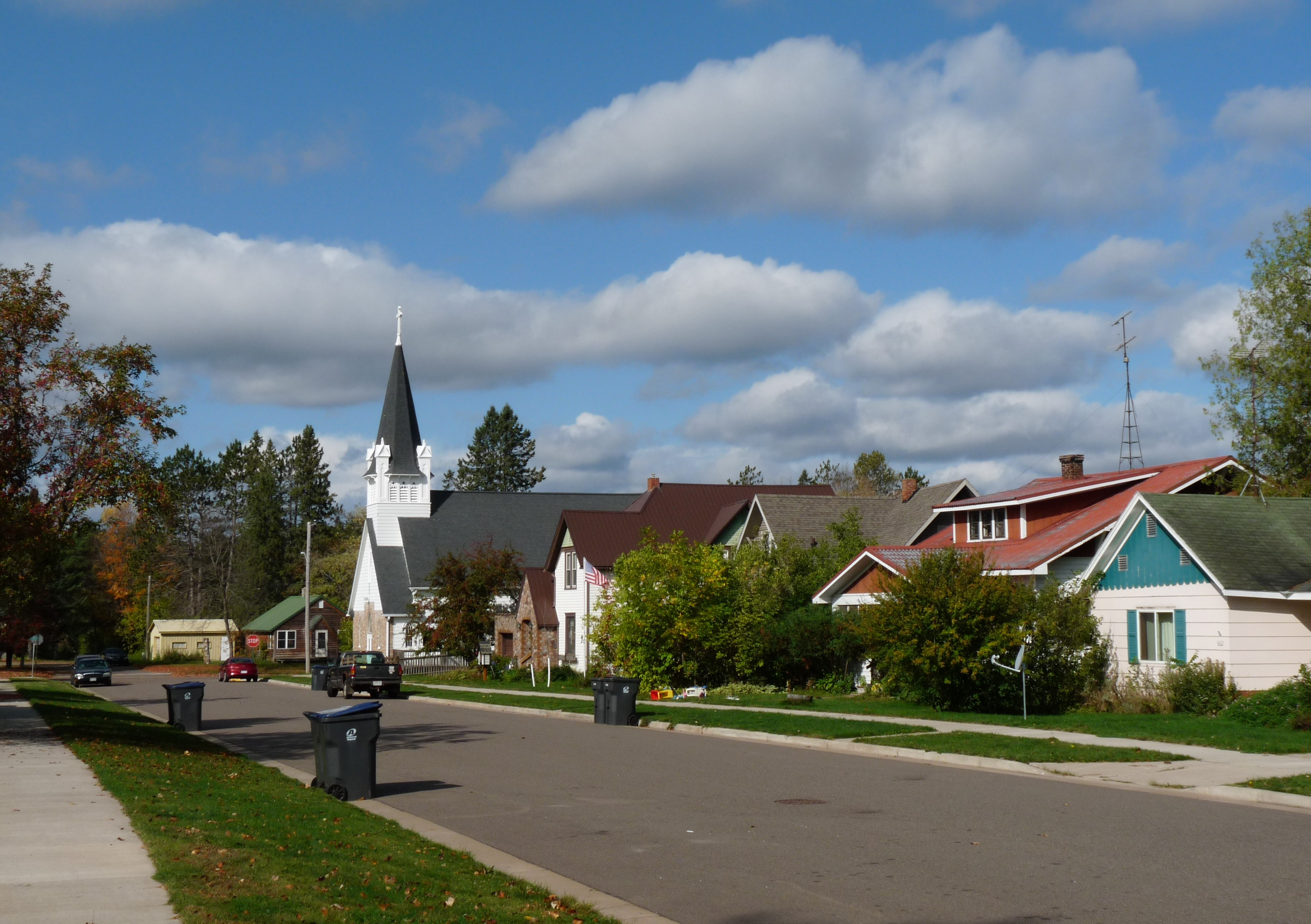
Looking west on Main Street

== Demographics ==
Historical population
Census	Pop.	Note	%±
1890	365		—
1900	939		157.3%
1910	606		−35.5%
1920	588		−3.0%
1930	437		−25.7%
1940	452		3.4%
1950	477		5.5%
1960	427		−10.5%
1970	519		21.5%
1980	605		16.6%
1990	571		−5.6%
2000	626		9.6%
2010	660		5.4%
2020	563		−14.7%
U.S. Decennial Census

=== 2010 census ===
As of the census of 2010, there were 660 people, 293 households, and 180 families living in the village. The population density was 331.7 inhabitants per square mile (128.1/km^{2}). There were 340 housing units at an average density of 170.9 per square mile (66.0/km^{2}). The racial makeup of the village was 97.1% White, 0.9% African American, 0.9% Native American, and 1.1% from two or more races. Hispanic or Latino people of any race were 1.1% of the population.

There were 293 households, of which 31.7% had children under the age of 18 living with them, 42.0% were married couples living together, 14.3% had a female householder with no husband present, 5.1% had a male householder with no wife present, and 38.6% were non-families. 33.8% of all households were made up of individuals, and 14.7% had someone living alone who was 65 years of age or older. The average household size was 2.25 and the average family size was 2.87.

The median age in the village was 39.4 years. 25.6% of residents were under the age of 18; 7.5% were between the ages of 18 and 24; 22.3% were from 25 to 44; 27.9% were from 45 to 64; and 16.8% were 65 years of age or older. The gender makeup of the village was 45.8% male and 54.2% female.

=== 2000 census ===
As of the census of 2000, there were 626 people, 285 households, and 167 families living in the village. The population density was 312.8 people per square mile (120.8/km^{2}). There were 316 housing units at an average density of 157.9 per square mile (61.0/km^{2}). The racial makeup of the village was 97.28% White, 0.48% Black or African American, 1.12% Native American, 0.00% Asian, 0.00% Pacific Islander, 0.48% from other races, and 0.64% from two or more races. 2.08% of the population were Hispanic or Latino of any race.

There were 285 households, out of which 29.8% had children under the age of 18 living with them, 45.6% were married couples living together, 8.8% had a female householder with no husband present, and 41.4% were non-families. 35.8% of all households were made up of individuals, and 19.3% had someone living alone who was 65 years of age or older. The average household size was 2.20 and the average family size was 2.91.

In the village, the population was spread out, with 25.2% under the age of 18, 6.2% from 18 to 24, 27.3% from 25 to 44, 23.6% from 45 to 64, and 17.6% who were 65 years of age or older. The median age was 39 years. For every 100 females, there were 98.7 males. For every 100 females age 18 and over, there were 85.7 males.

The median income for a household in the village was $26,563, and the median income for a family was $46,406. Males had a median income of $31,944 versus $23,750 for females. The per capita income for the village was $16,216. 16.4% of the population and 13.5% of families were below the poverty line. 25.9% of those under the age of 18 and 10.7% of those 65 and older were living below the poverty line.

== Transportation ==
Prentice is served by the Prentice Airport (5N2). Located one mile east of the village, the airport handles approximately 1,500 operations per year, with roughly 99% general aviation and 1% air taxi. The airport has a 3,134-foot (955 m) asphalt runway (Runway 9-27).

== Notable natives ==
- Albin C. Bro, President of Shimer College
- Leo Heikkinen, entrepreneur
- Donal Hord, sculptor
- Dennis Morgan, actor and tenor
- Oscar V. Peterson, Medal of Honor recipient

== See also ==
- List of villages in Wisconsin
- Pine Line Trail
