= Prentice Airport =

- IATA: PRW; ICAO: none; FAA LID: 5N2

Summary
- Airport type: Public
- Owner: Village of Prentice
- Serves: Prentice, Wisconsin
- Opened: April 1968
- Time zone: CST (UTC−06:00)
  - Summer (DST): CDT (UTC−05:00)
- Elevation AMSL: 1,579 ft / 481 m
- Coordinates: 45°32′18″N 090°16′35″W

Map
- Location of airport in Wisconsin 5N2 (the United States)

Runways
Direction	Length		Surface
Direction	ft	m	Surface
9/27	3,134	955	Asphalt

Statistics
- Aircraft operations (2023): 1,520
- Based aircraft (2024): 1
- Source: Federal Aviation Administration

Prentice Airport (IATA: PRW, FAA LID: 5N2) is a public use airport located one nautical mile (2 km) east of the central business district of Prentice, a village in the town of Prentice, Price County, Wisconsin, United States. It is owned by the village of Prentice.

== Facilities and aircraft ==
Prentice Airport covers an area of 28 acres (11 ha) at an elevation of 1,579 feet (481 m) above mean sea level. It has one runway designated 9/27 with an asphalt surface measuring 3,134 by 60 feet (955 x 18 m).

For the 12-month period ending June 22, 2023, the airport had 1,520 aircraft operations, an average of 127 per month: 99% general aviation and 1% air taxi. In August 2024, there was 1 aircraft based at this airport: 1 ultra-light.

== See also ==
- List of airports in Wisconsin
