= Fifield, Wisconsin =

- Town
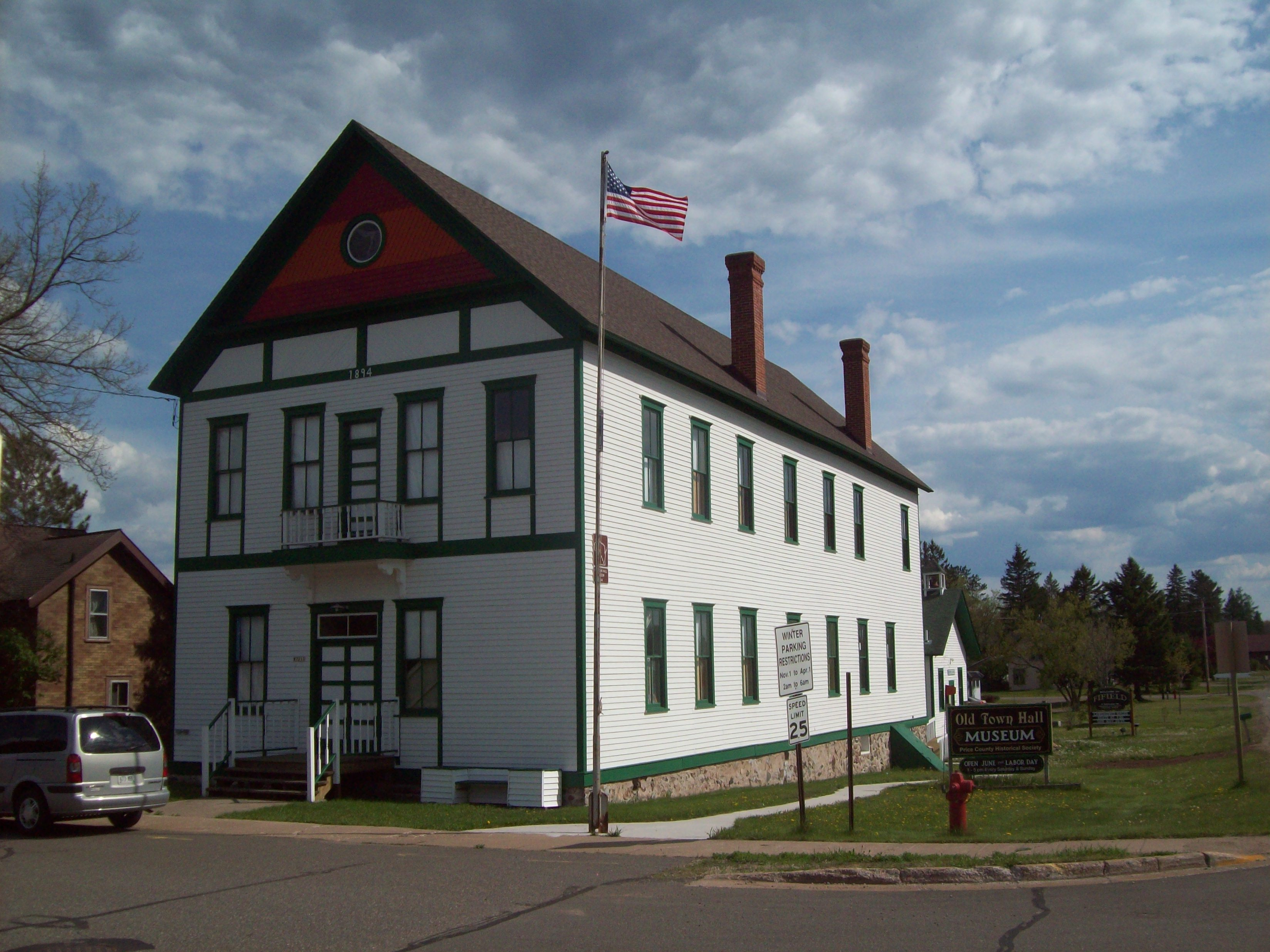
- The old Fifield Town Hall, now the home of the Price County Historical Society Museum

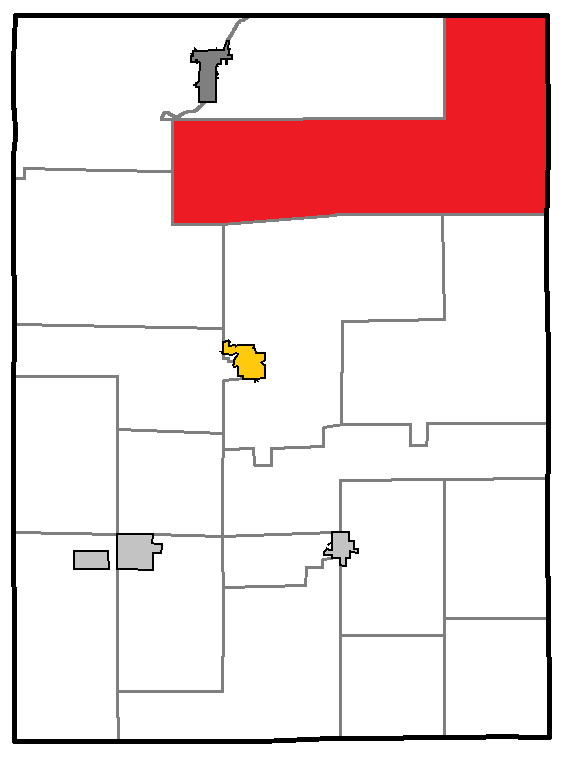
- Location of Fifield, within Price County
- Coordinates: 45°52′55″N 90°16′52″W
- Country: United States
- State: Wisconsin
- County: Price

Area
  - Total: 156.4 sq mi (405.2 km^{2})
  - Land: 149.4 sq mi (386.9 km^{2})
  - Water: 7.1 sq mi (18.4 km^{2})
- Elevation: 1,558 ft (475 m)

Population (2020)
  - Total: 905
  - Density: 6.06/sq mi (2.34/km^{2})
- Time zone: UTC-6 (Central (CST))
  - Summer (DST): UTC-5 (CDT)
- Area codes: 715 & 534
- FIPS code: 55-25775
- GNIS feature ID: 1583202
- Website: http://www.tn.fifield.wi.gov/

Fifield is a town in Price County, Wisconsin, United States. The population was 905 at the 2020 census. The unincorporated community of Fifield is in town, as is the ghost town of Coolidge.

== History ==
Fifield was founded in 1876, where the Wisconsin Central Railroad crossed the Flambeau River's south fork in the big northern forest. The town is named after Sam Fifield, a politician and businessman who was Wisconsin's 14th lieutenant governor.

As logging boomed and the population grew, a town hall was built in 1882, but it burned in the fire of 1893, along with Fifield's business district of 60 buildings. The next spring, the town rebuilt the hall with the same dimensions, headed by carpenter Theodore Ristin.

== Geography ==
According to the United States Census Bureau, the town has an area of 156.5 square miles (405.3 km^{2}), of which 149.4 square miles (386.9 km^{2}) is land and 7.1 square miles (18.4 km^{2}) (4.53%) is water.

== Demographics ==
As of the census of 2020, there was 948 people and 503 households residing in the town. The population density was 6.3 people per square mile (2.4/km^{2}). There were 1,058 housing units, at an average density of 7.06 per square mile (2.73/km^{2}). From the total of 1 058 housing units, 81% were single units, 19% were mobile homes, and 1% was a multi-unit.

The racial makeup of the town was 96.4% White, 0.2% Native American, 1.6% Asian, 0.4% from other races, and 1.4% from two or more races.

The population of 948 consists of: 14% under the age of 18, followed by 49% from ages 20 to 64, and 37% of people were 65 and older. The median age is 57.3 years. The population was recorded as 48% female, and 52% male.

Educational alignment showed that 95.1% of people finished high school grad or higher, while 19.5% had a Bachelor's degree or higher.

Out of 503 households, 58% were married couples living together, 11% had a female householder, 3% had a male householder, and 28% were non-families. On average, the household size was 1.9 people.

The median income for a household in the town was $58,523. The per capita income for the town was $37,464. About 10% of the population were below the poverty line, including 34% of those under age 18, and 3% of those age 65 or over.

== Historic locations ==
- Fifield Fire Lookout Tower
- Fifield Town Hall
- Round Lake Logging Dam

== Notable people ==
- Robert W. Aschenbrener (1920–2009), World War II flying ace.
- Barbara Anne Davis (1930–2008), All-American Girls Professional Baseball League player.
