= Prentice Co-operative Creamery Company =

- U.S. National Register of Historic Places
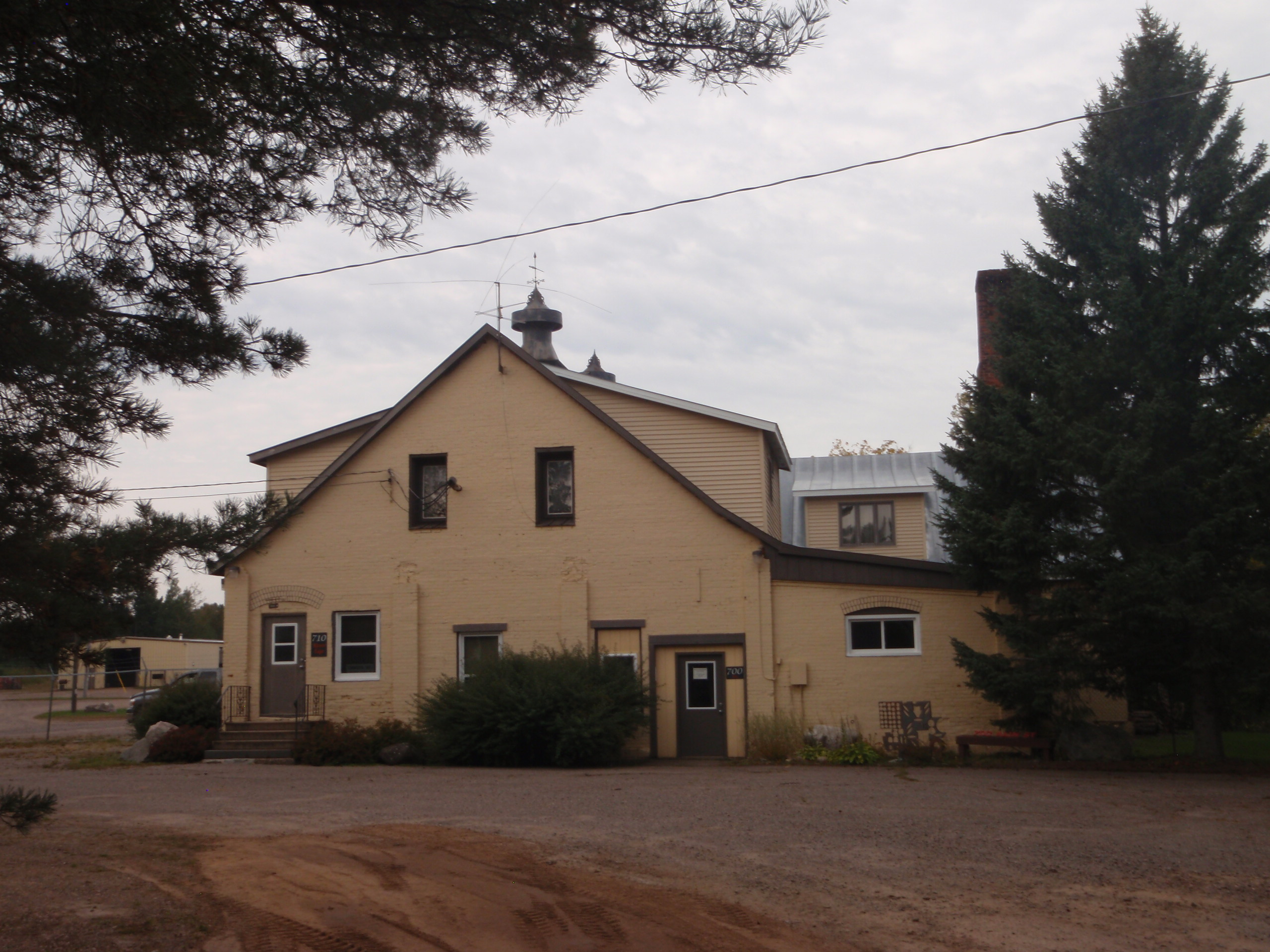
- Location: 700 Main St. Prentice, Wisconsin
- Coordinates: 45.54684°N 90.29173°W
- Built: 1906
- NRHP reference No.: 85002329
- Added to NRHP: September 12, 1985

The Prentice Co-operative Creamery Company in Prentice, Wisconsin was central to the community's transition from lumber to agriculture. It was added to the National Register of Historic Places in 1985.

== History ==
Prentice was founded on the lumber industry when the local sawmill opened in 1882. But the sawmill closed in the 1890s when the best timber ran out. Without that big industry, people wondered how little communities left in the cut-over would survive.

The United States Leather Company had run a tannery in Prentice starting in the late 1800s, using hemlock bark from the surrounding forests in its tanning process. It was the only industry in town after the sawmill closed. When the tannery burned in February 1906, U.S. Leather rebuilt it, with the core of the current creamery building as its hide house. But then the tannery burned again after only a couple weeks of operation. The brick hide house survived the fire.

Meanwhile, more and more farmers had been settling the surrounding cut-over lands left by logging. Around 1903 the private Prentice Creamery started buying milk and selling butter. In 1915, a farmers' co-operative called the Prentice Co-operative Creamery Company was formed, and it converted the old hide house to a dairy plant. It produced 500 pounds of butter in its first day of operation; by July 1917 it produced over 9000 pounds in six days. The local paper gushed: Everyone is urged to boost for the farmers creamery because it is a small industry which will help to do wonders to help develop the farming community, the prosperity of which causes the town to improve.

The co-op closed in 1931 during the Great Depression, but was re-opened by R.J. Peterson as the Price County Dairy. In 1933 this was taken over by the Price County Co-operative Dairy Association, which shifted production to cheese. In its first nine months it produced 100,632 pounds of butter and 153,832 pounds of cheese.

The creamery closed in the 1940s, and the building was used by Heikkinen Machine Company, Prentice Wood Products, La Font Corporation, and the Prentek Corporation.
