= Round Lake Logging Dam =

- U.S. National Register of Historic Places
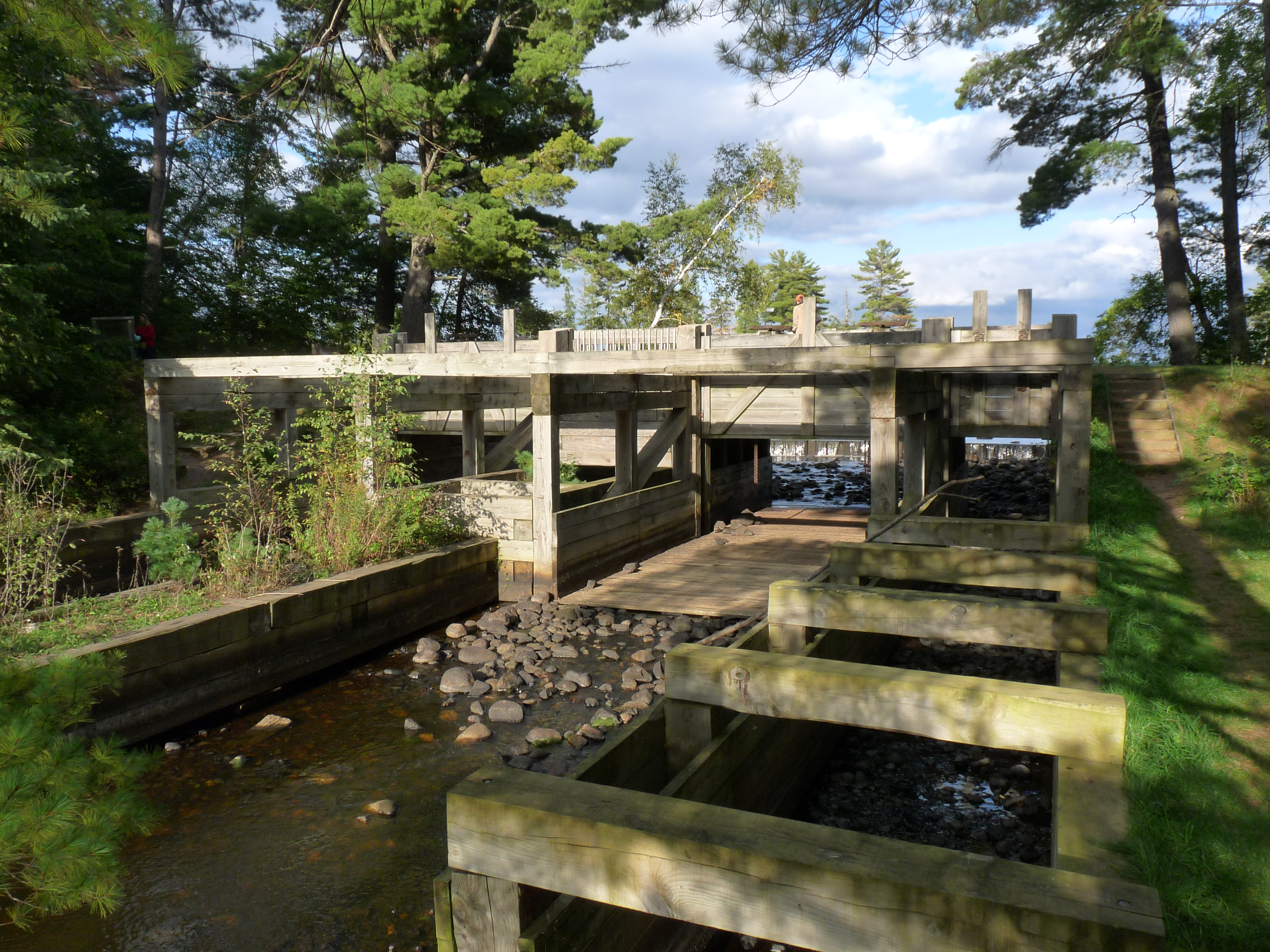
- Round Lake Logging Dam
- Location: Fifield, Wisconsin
- Coordinates: 45.925833°N 90.079167°W
- Built: between 1878 and 1886
- NRHP reference No.: 81000055
- Added to NRHP: September 17, 1981

The Round Lake Logging Dam is a historic dam on the south fork of the Flambeau River eighteen miles east of Fifield, Wisconsin, United States, where the river flows out of Round Lake. This earth and timber dam was originally built around 1880 to help lumber companies drive logs down the Flambeau River to sawmills around Eau Claire and beyond on the Mississippi. The wood parts of the dam were crumbling by the 1930s, so it was rebuilt then and again in 1995. The dam was added to the National Register of Historic Places in 1981 - the only known surviving logging dam in northern Wisconsin, representing backwoods engineering of the 1880s.

== Background ==
In the late 1800s, when the prairie farmers of Iowa and Illinois needed lumber for their houses and barns, and when cities like Dubuque and St. Louis had exhausted their nearby forests, northern Wisconsin was covered with forests and streams, and some parts of those forests were stands of white pine, one of the best woods for carpentry. There were no highways or railways through the forests yet, but the streams and rivers generally ran in the direction of markets for the lumber.

Seeing money to be made, lumber companies and speculators began buying up the forested land. Generally, lumber companies sent crews up the rivers and tote roads to build logging camps in their timber stands. In winter their crews felled trees, sawed them into 16-foot lengths, and sledded the logs over icy trails through the woods to riverbanks, where they stacked the logs on rollways until spring. Then in the spring when the water was up, they rolled the logs into the river and floated them downstream to sawmills. After the logs were sawed into boards, some were used locally, while others were bound into rafts and floated further down the river to markets like St. Louis.

The first sawmill in the Chippewa Valley was built around 1840 at what would become Chippewa Falls. Over the years as the closest timber was cut, logging operations moved up the Chippewa and its tributaries, with various lumber companies driving logs down the river each spring. After some winters with little snow, the spring floods weren't enough to move logs down the river, which could be a disaster for lumber companies heavily invested in timber, logging crews and sawmills. Individual companies built dams to somewhat control water levels, but they impeded the logs of other companies, and disputes arose regularly.

In 1876 Friedrich Weyerhäuser established the Chippewa River Improvement and Log Driving Company - a separate entity to serve the interests of many lumber companies. This company cleared troublesome rocks and snags from the river, built booms for sorting logs, and built dams to manage the water levels. These "flooding" dams (a.k.a. "flash" or "splash" dams) could be opened at just the right time to raise the water to push logs downstream. The huge Little Falls Dam at Holcombe, when fully opened, could raise the level of the Chippewa River three feet one hundred miles downstream. The Log Driving Company managed over a hundred dams in the Chippewa watershed.

== Round Lake dam ==

Because the south fork of the Flambeau River could carry logs, it was considered a navigable waterway, open to public use. As a result, building a dam on it required authorization from the state. In 1878 the state granted that authorization, for a dam "of sufficient height to flow said streams and lakes, and secure a sufficient depth of water for the easy running of logs." In 1880 Cornell University sold the land that the dam is on to Joseph Viles, who had built other dams, so it's likely that Viles built the Round Lake dam. He must have built it between 1878 and 1886, when it was mentioned in a legal document. An 1880 map of the area shows a dam at the outlet of Round Lake, along with a "winter road" threading its way up to it from Phillips.

Whoever built the dam, they used mostly local materials - timber, rock and dirt. No concrete was shipped in, no pile-drivers, no bulldozers. They probably moved heavy materials with oxen or with men's strong backs. Local timbers were squared with axes and adzes. Only the iron mechanism to raise and lower the gates was brought in from outside.

The Round Lake dam consists of a central wooden structure which contains the gates and sluiceways, flanked by an earthen embankment on each side, with the south embankment much longer than the north. Since the river beneath is not rocky to anchor the structure, the foundation of the wooden structure is long timbers which reach across the river bottom, with their ends buried in the embankments on each side. On this foundation three sluiceways were built, each with a gate to control its flow independent of the other sluiceways. The northern sluiceway is fifteen feet wide, the middle "waste gate" is fifteen feet, and the southern sluiceway ten feet wide. Between the two fifteen-foot gates is a ten-foot wide log crib filled with rock and earth. Below the gates, the chutes are clad with a 24-foot-long floor of wooden planks to prevent the plunging logs and water from gouging out a hole which could undermine the dam. The gate structure is topped with a 19-foot wide deck from which workers could operate the gates and direct logs from the lake through the sluice gates.

The earthen embankments flanking the central wooden structure stop the lake from flowing across the low ground around the wooden dam. The lake-facing sides of the embankments were protected from erosion by timber abutments, which were secured by chains connected to logs buried in the embankment.

The Round Lake dam was one step in moving timber out of the wilderness. Logs from logging camps in the surrounding area were sledded to the shores of Round Lake and the adjoining lakes. Unlike the Flambeau River, these lakes had no current even in springtime, so the logs had to be towed across the lakes to the dam by a steam tugboat pulling floating logs in booms.

Exactly how the dam was used is not recorded - there are no photos or accounts from that time. All three gates could be closed to build up a "head" of water - i.e. raise the level of Round Lake in prep for driving logs down the Flambeau. Then one or both of the two outer "sluice gates" could be opened so workers could use pike poles to feed logs through to the pond below the dam. When a thousand had accumulated in the pond, the central "waste gate" of the dam could be opened to raise the level of the pond and flush the logs downstream. One crew of log drivers tried to stay ahead of the logs, watching for jams and breaking them up before they grew into major problems. Another crew followed the last logs, untangling stragglers from brush along the banks. The gates were left open for a while to keep the river up, lifting the logs over rapids and obstacles.

Weyerhaueser's Chippewa River Improvement and Log Driving Company managed the dam through the 1880s, the peak of pine logging on the Chippewa watershed. In those years, most of the logs from Round Lake went to sawmills around Eau Claire and on the Mississippi. In the 1890s timber on the Chippewa watershed was beginning to run out, and the big mills probably stopped receiving logs from Round Lake around 1901. That's when the last log raft left Eau Claire and the dam's ownership went to Price County for back taxes.

But the dam continued operation for some years. Some smaller sawmills had started at Fifield, twenty miles down the Flambeau from Round Lake. First of those was the Van Dusen mill/Fifield Manufacturing in 1891. The Liebelt and Landgraf/Patterson Mill started in 1899, and the Central Lumber Company and Shingle Mill in 1902. After 1901, most of the timber cut around Round Lake probably went down the Flambeau to these mills in Fifield, to be sawed and used locally or shipped out on the Wisconsin Central Railway. The last log drive from the Round Lake dam started in spring of 1909 - 5,000 logs headed down the Flambeau for the Patterson Brothers' sawmill in Fifield.

== Preservation ==
Otto Doering, a vice-president of Sears, Roebuck and Company bought parcels adjacent to the dam in 1911 and 1912, and received title to the dam itself in 1915. In following years, he bought up 2,876 acres in the area, including all lakefront on Tucker and Jupa lakes, half the frontage on Round Lake, and the land for a few miles downstream along the Flambeau. Doering amassed this estate as his "wilderness camp" - a getaway from city life fashionable among the wealthy in that period. Doering's estate included several lodges, a kitchen and dining hall, a caretaker's house, and barns. By the 1930s the wooden parts of the 50-year-old dam were rotting. Doering cared about the old structure, and he and his caretakers rebuilt it "just as the original dam was," according to one of the caretakers.

After Doering died, his family was less interested and in 1968 sold the land that the dam is on to the Forest Service, which incorporated it into the Chequamegon National Forest. By the 1980s (another 50 years) the wooden part of the dam was again failing, and the dam was again renovated from 1992 to 1995 by the Forest Service, Price County Historical Society, and the Friends of the Round Lake Logging Dam.

== Photos from 1980 ==
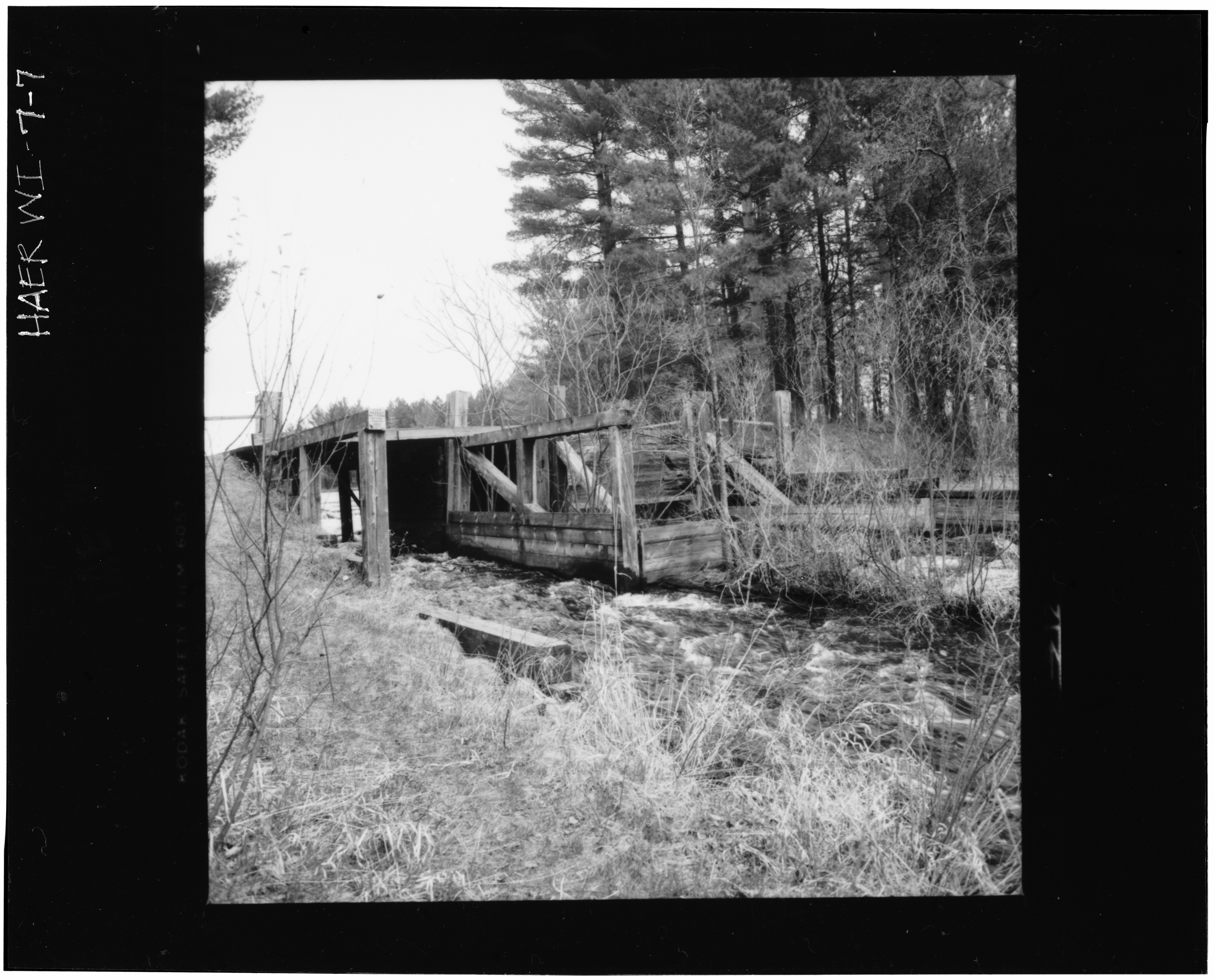
Middle and southern sluicegates from downstream, north bank

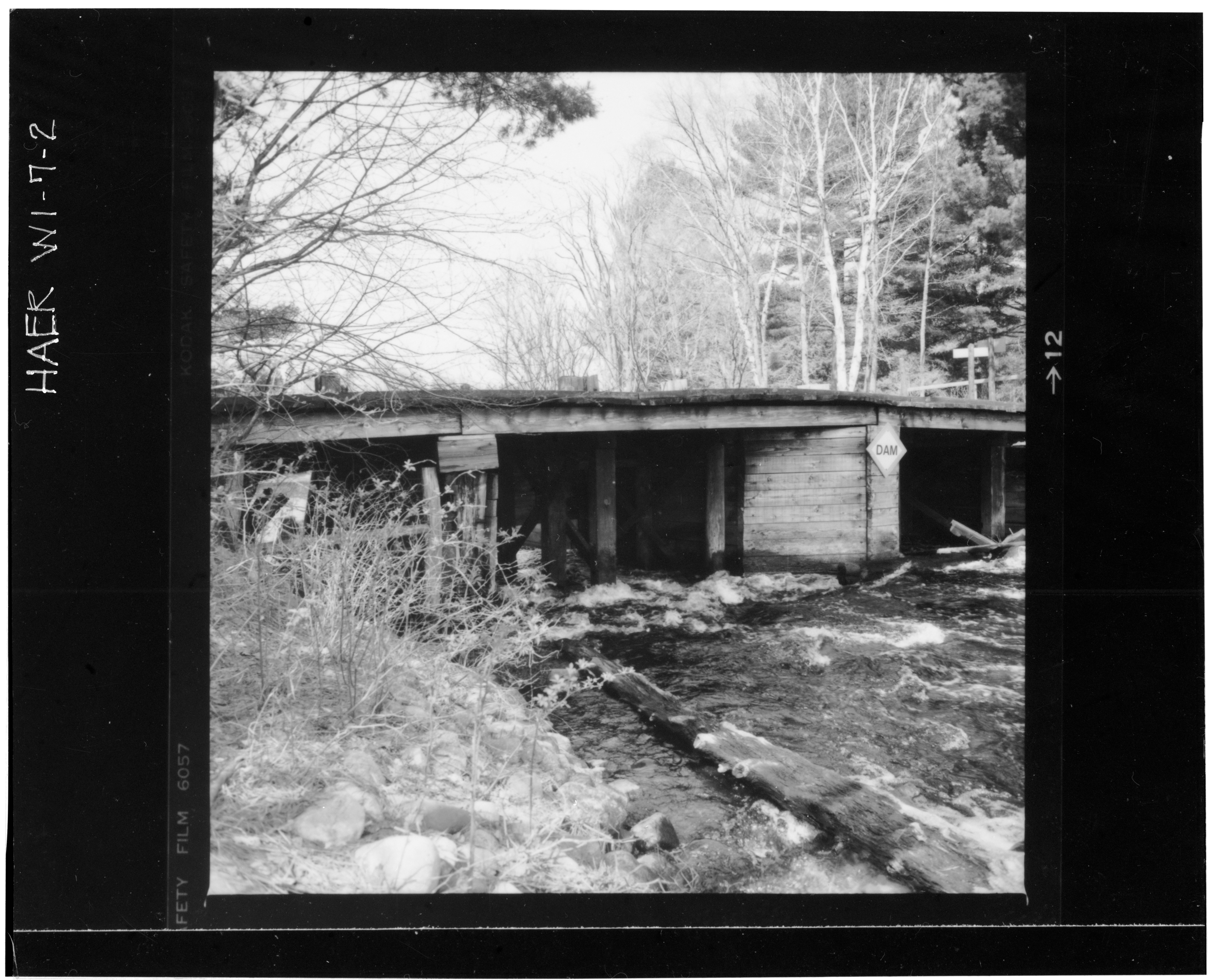
Northern sluice gate and crib structure from below the dam, north bank

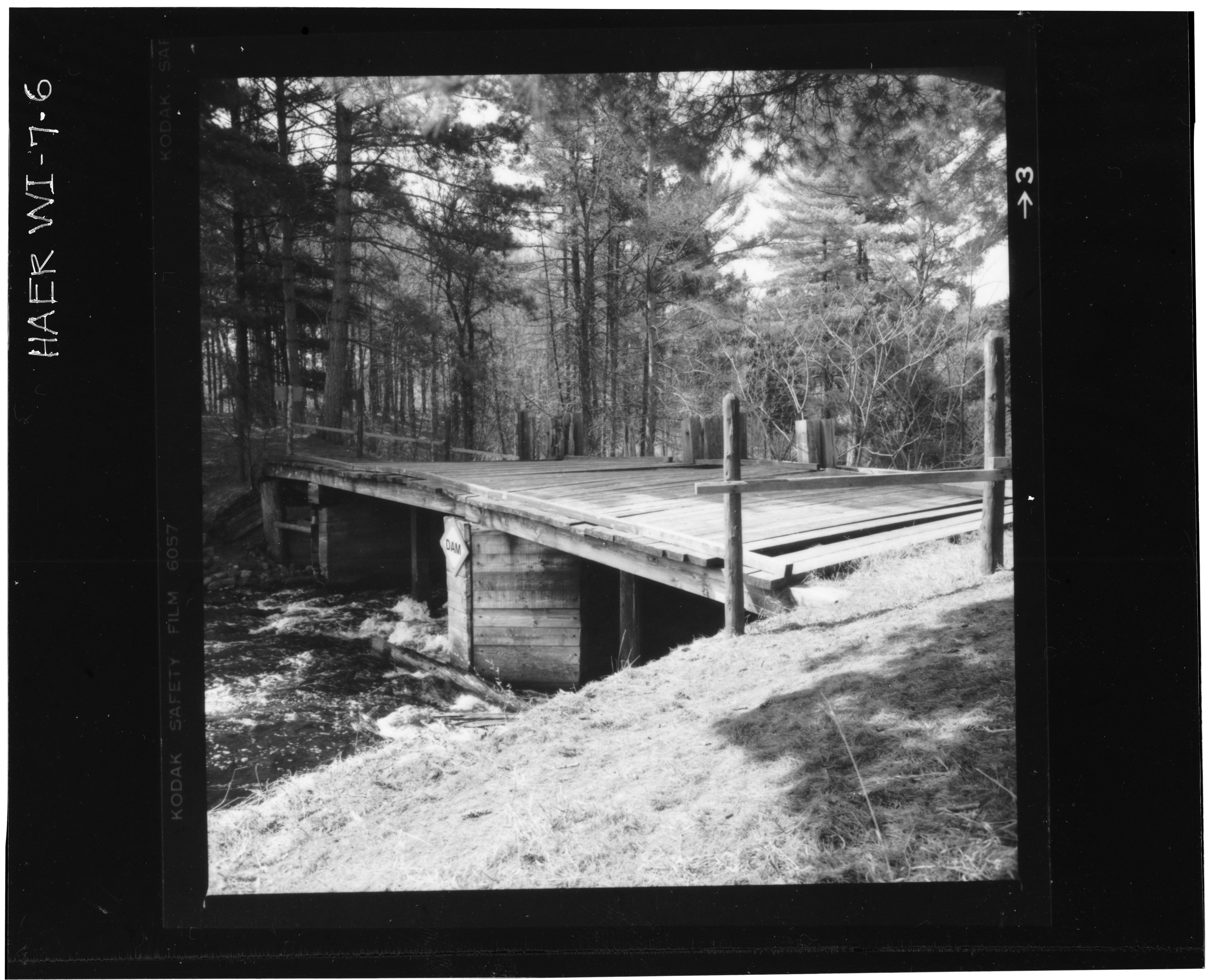
From north embankment above the dam

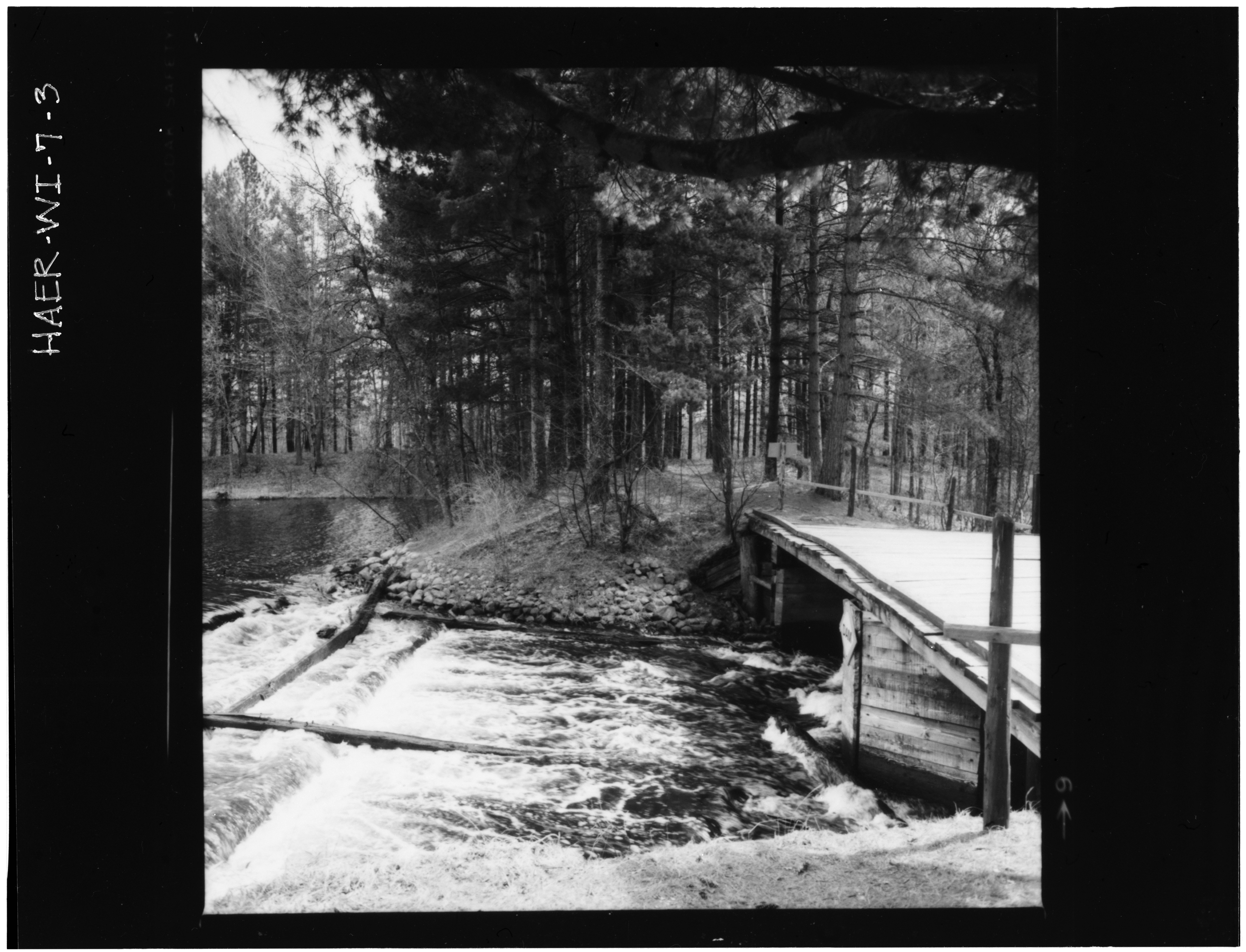
Looking from north embankment above the dam toward south embankment and dam

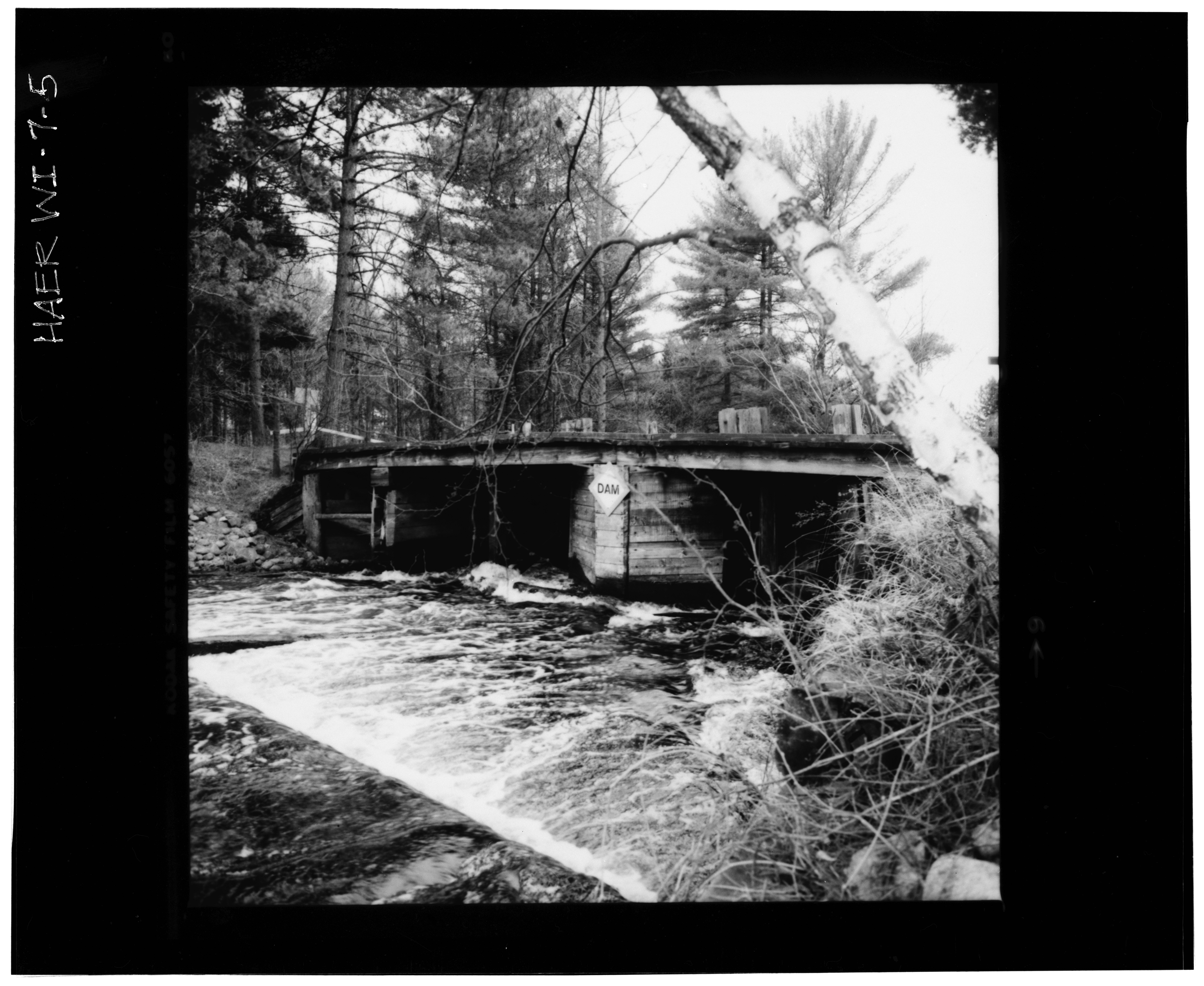
From north shore above the dam

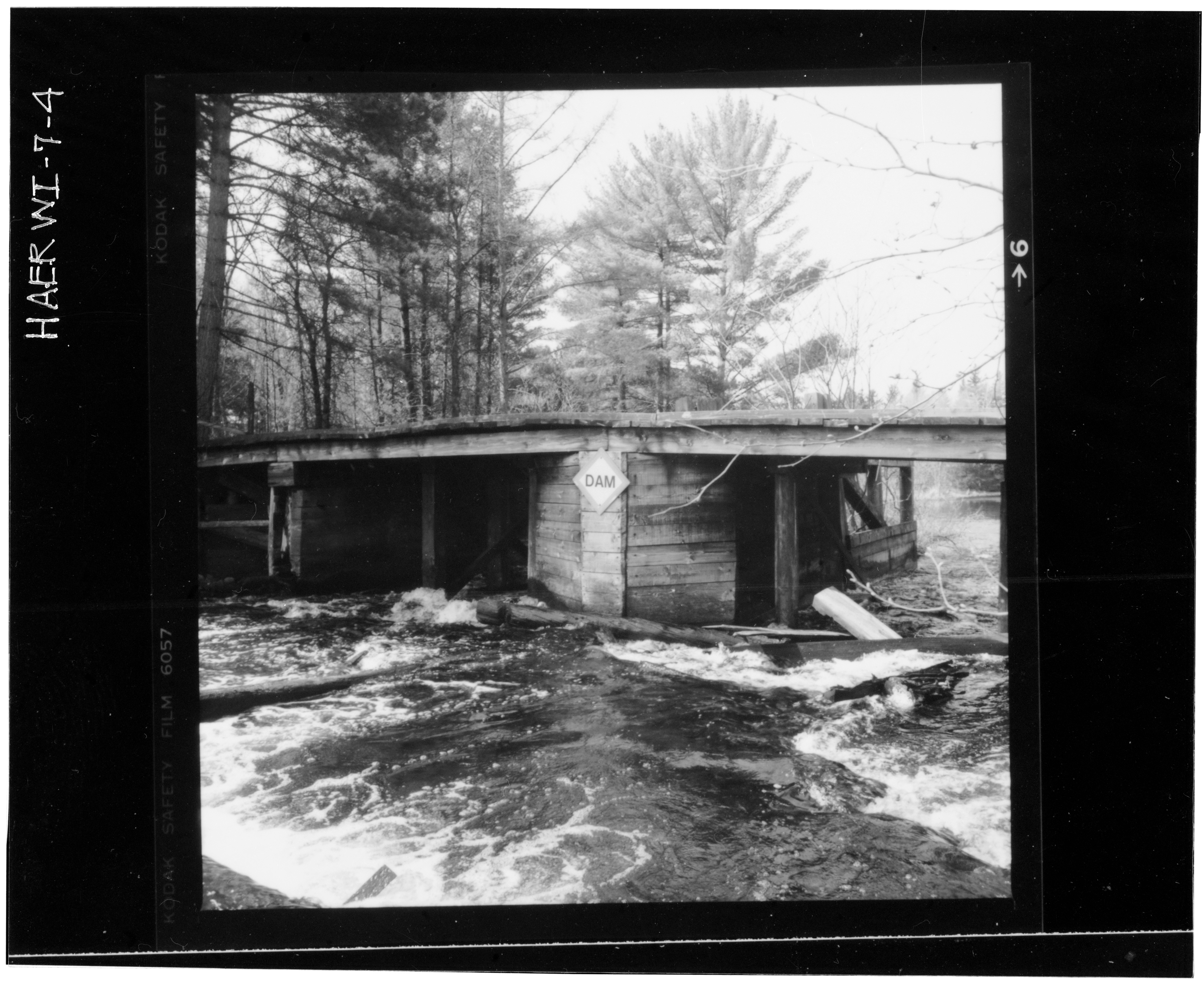
Dam from upstream/lake side

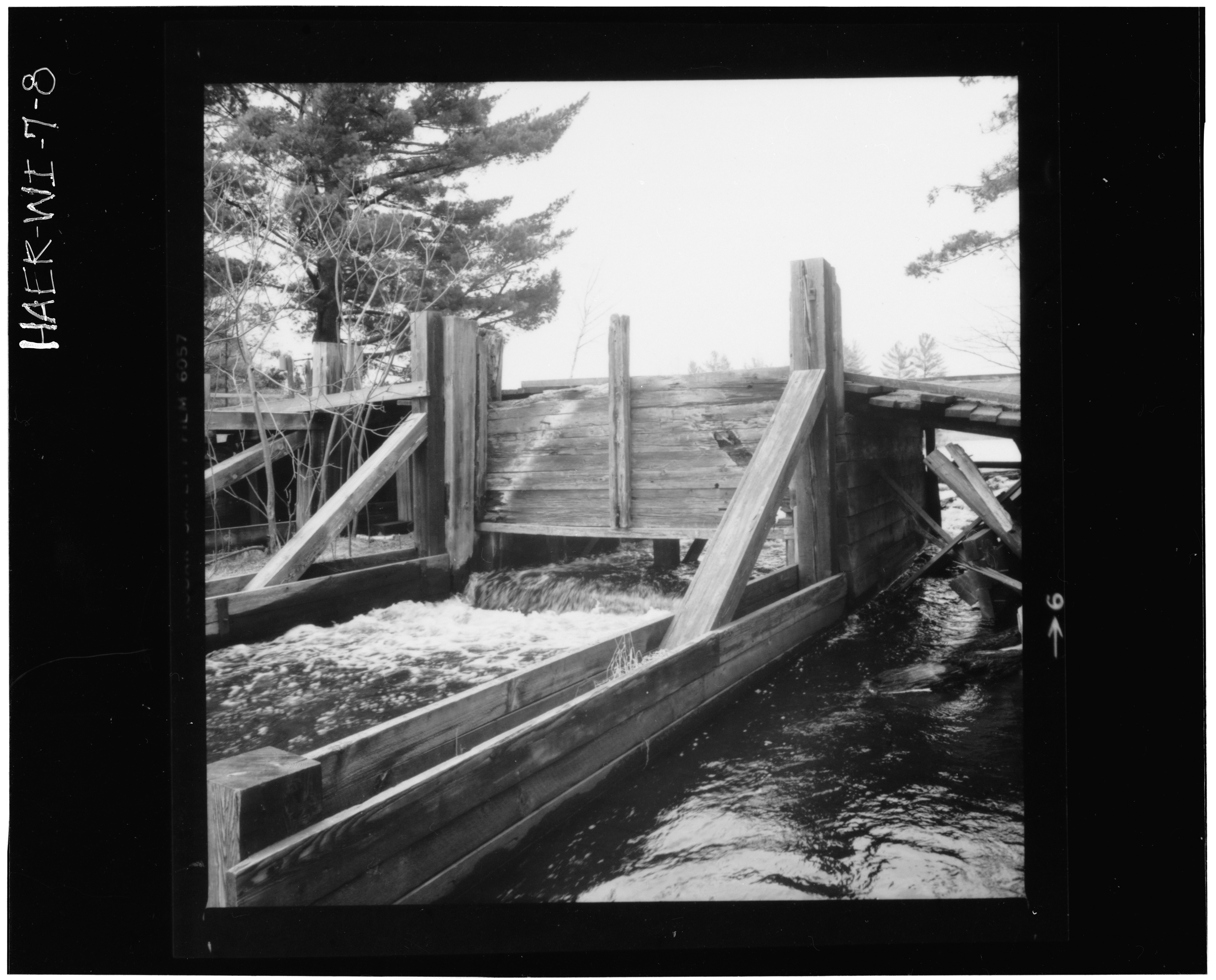
Middle sluicegate from downstream, south bank

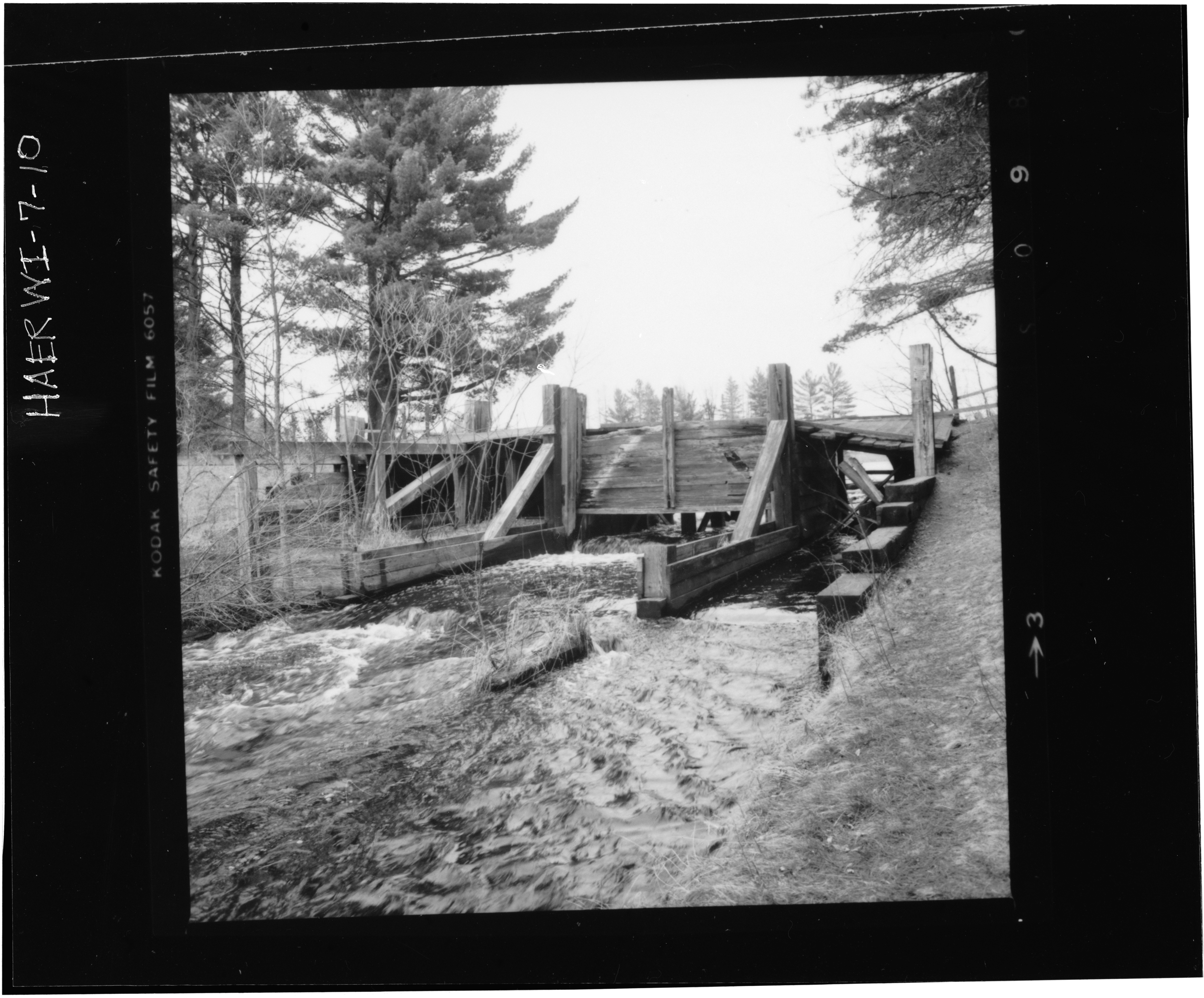
Middle and southern sluicegate from downstream, south bank

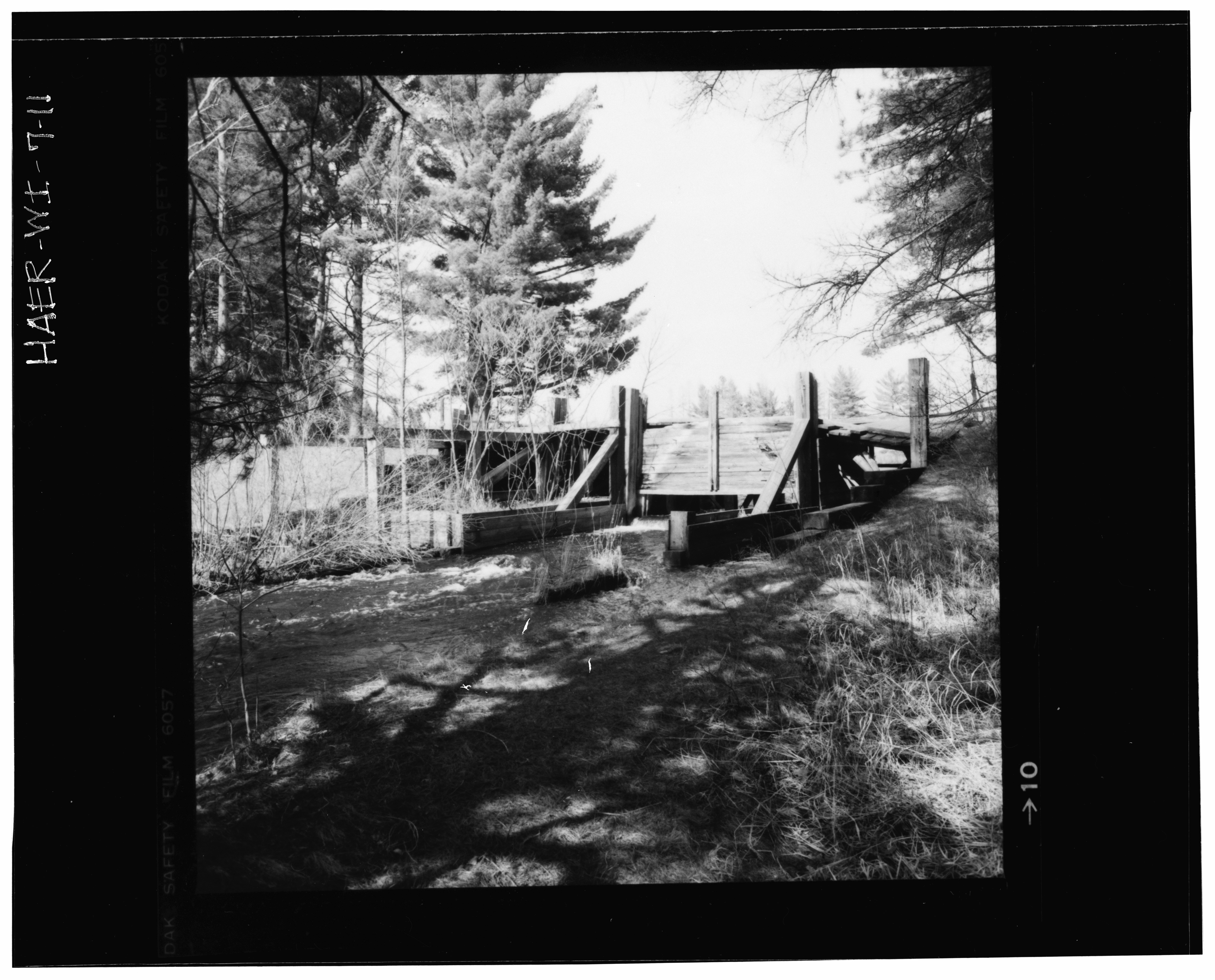
All gates, crib, and retaining wall from downstream, south bank

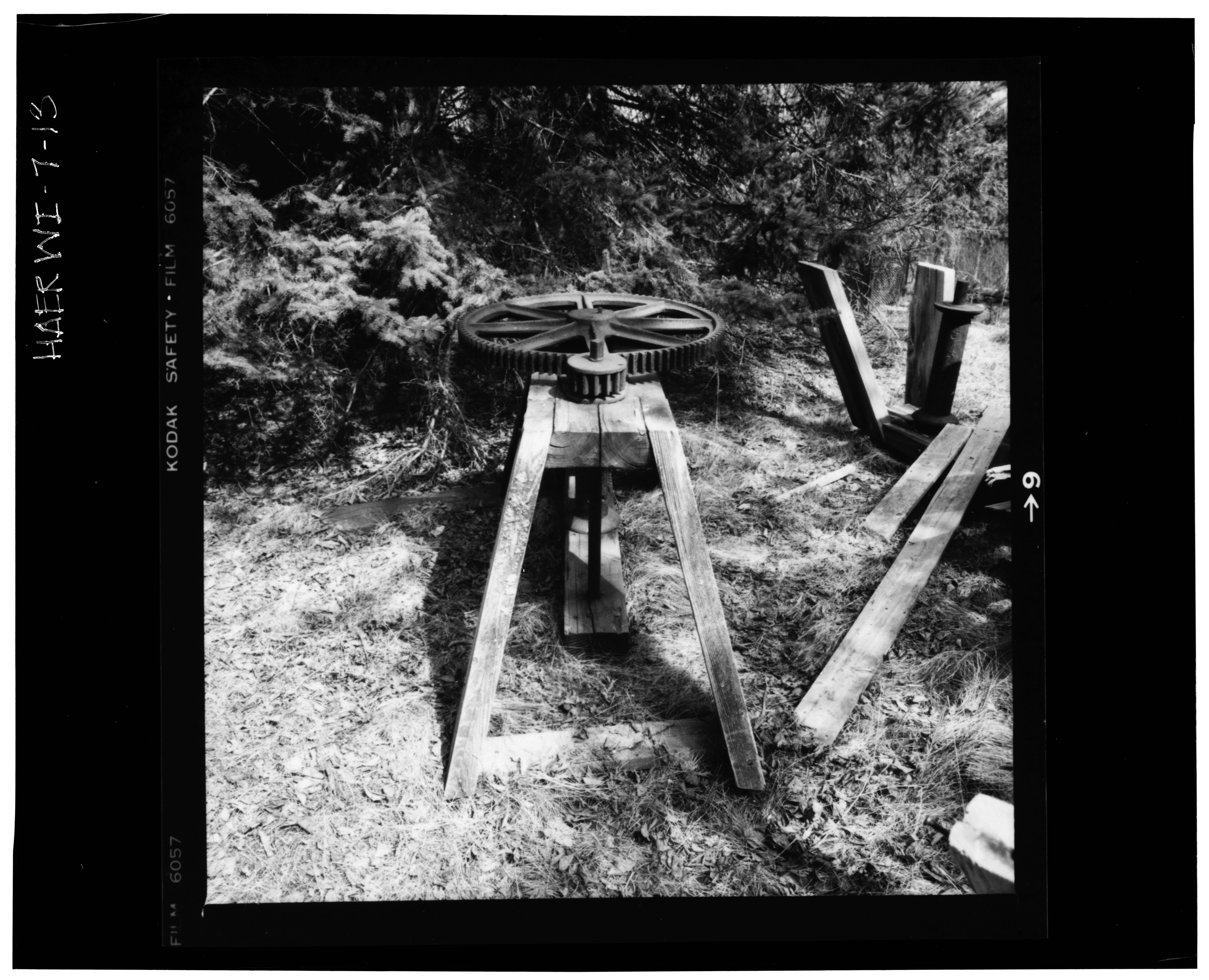
Gate-raising mechanism, while disassembled from dam
