= Fifield Fire Lookout Tower =

- U.S. National Register of Historic Places
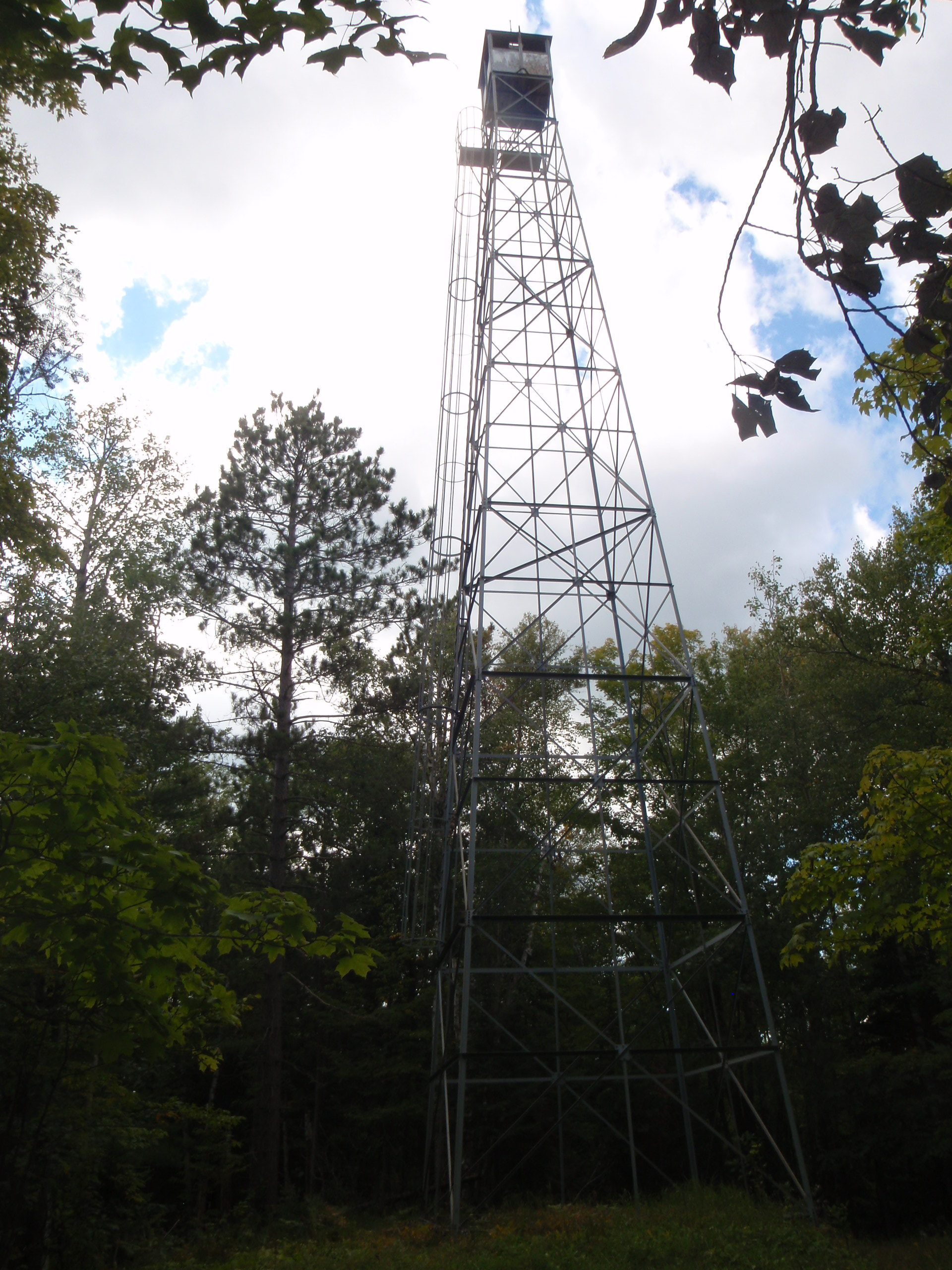
- Location: Fifield, Wisconsin
- Coordinates: 45.8868°N 90.32429°W
- Built: 1932
- NRHP reference No.: 07000668
- Added to NRHP: July 3, 2007

The Fifield Fire Lookout Tower is located in the Chequamegon-Nicolet National Forest in Fifield, Wisconsin. It was added to the National Register of Historic Places in 2007.

== History ==
The tower was constructed and originally used by the Wisconsin Conservation Commission. In 1935, the United States Forest Service assumed control and operations of it. The tower remained in use until 1973.
