= Fifield Town Hall =

- U.S. National Register of Historic Places
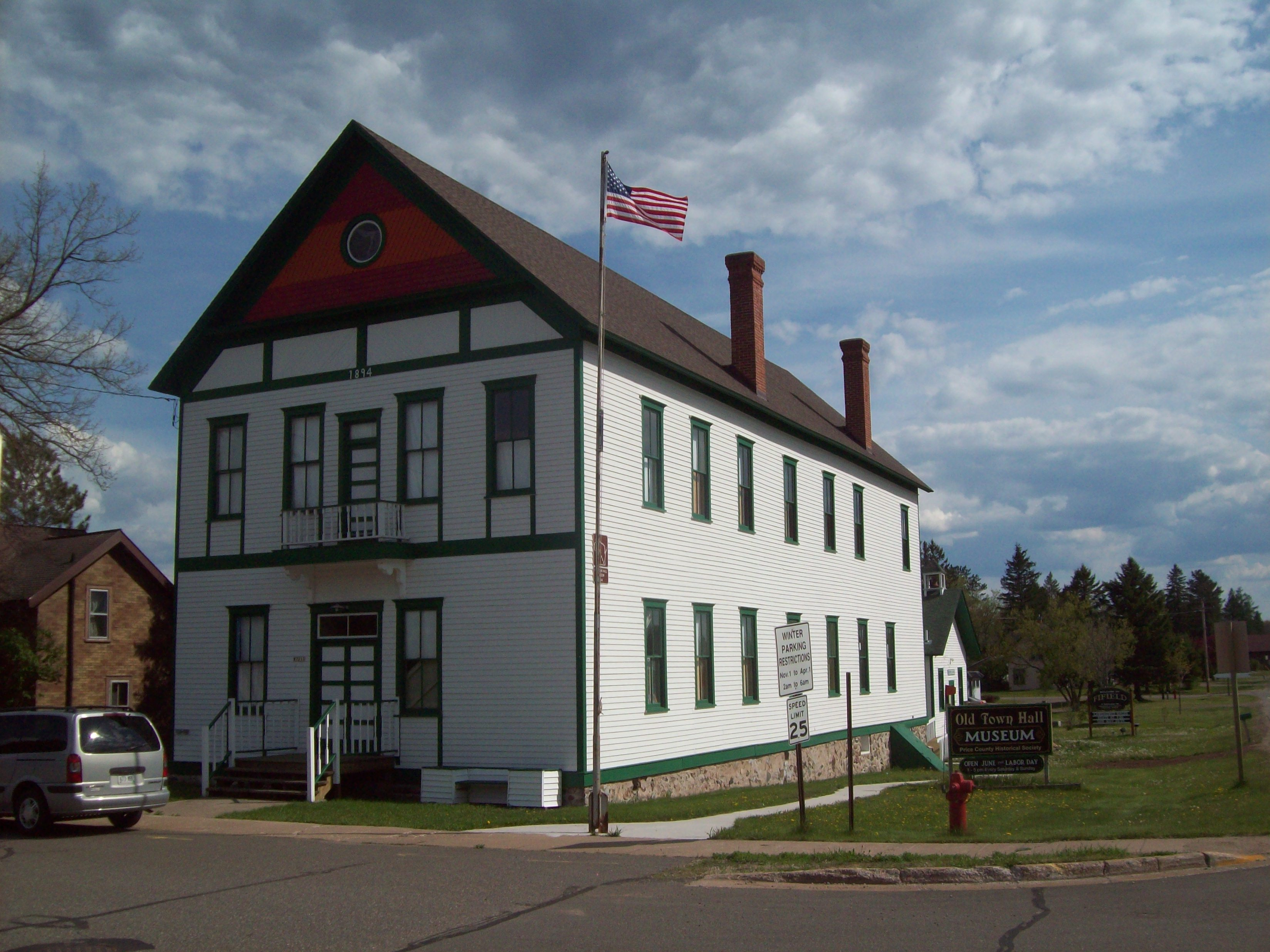
- Fifield Town Hall
- Location: Fifield, Wisconsin
- Coordinates: 45.87734°N 90.42123°W
- Built: 1894
- Architect: Theodore Ristin
- NRHP reference No.: 78000339
- Added to NRHP: February 17, 1978

The Fifield Town Hall is a civic building in Fifield, Wisconsin, built in 1894. It was added to the National Register of Historic Places in 1978.

Fifield was founded in 1876, where the Wisconsin Central Railroad crossed the south fork of the Flambeau River in the big northern forest. Logging boomed and the population grew. A town hall was built in 1882, but burned in the fire of 1893, along with Fifield's whole business district of 60 buildings. The following spring, the town rebuilt the current hall with the same dimensions, headed by carpenter Theodore Ristin.

The hall initially housed all functions of local government, with a clerk's room with a vault, and a two-celled jail. It also hosted meetings of community organizations like the VFW and the Red Cross, and social functions like local plays, graduations, lectures, traveling shows, medicine shows, and dances in the "opera house" upstairs. Elections were held here, and public announcements like the closing of the polls were made from the front balcony.

In 1966 a new town hall was built and the old hall was considered for demolition, but instead it was restored and now serves as the Price County Historical Society Museum, operated by the historical society of Price County, Wisconsin.
