= Flambeau River =

River in Wisconsin, United States

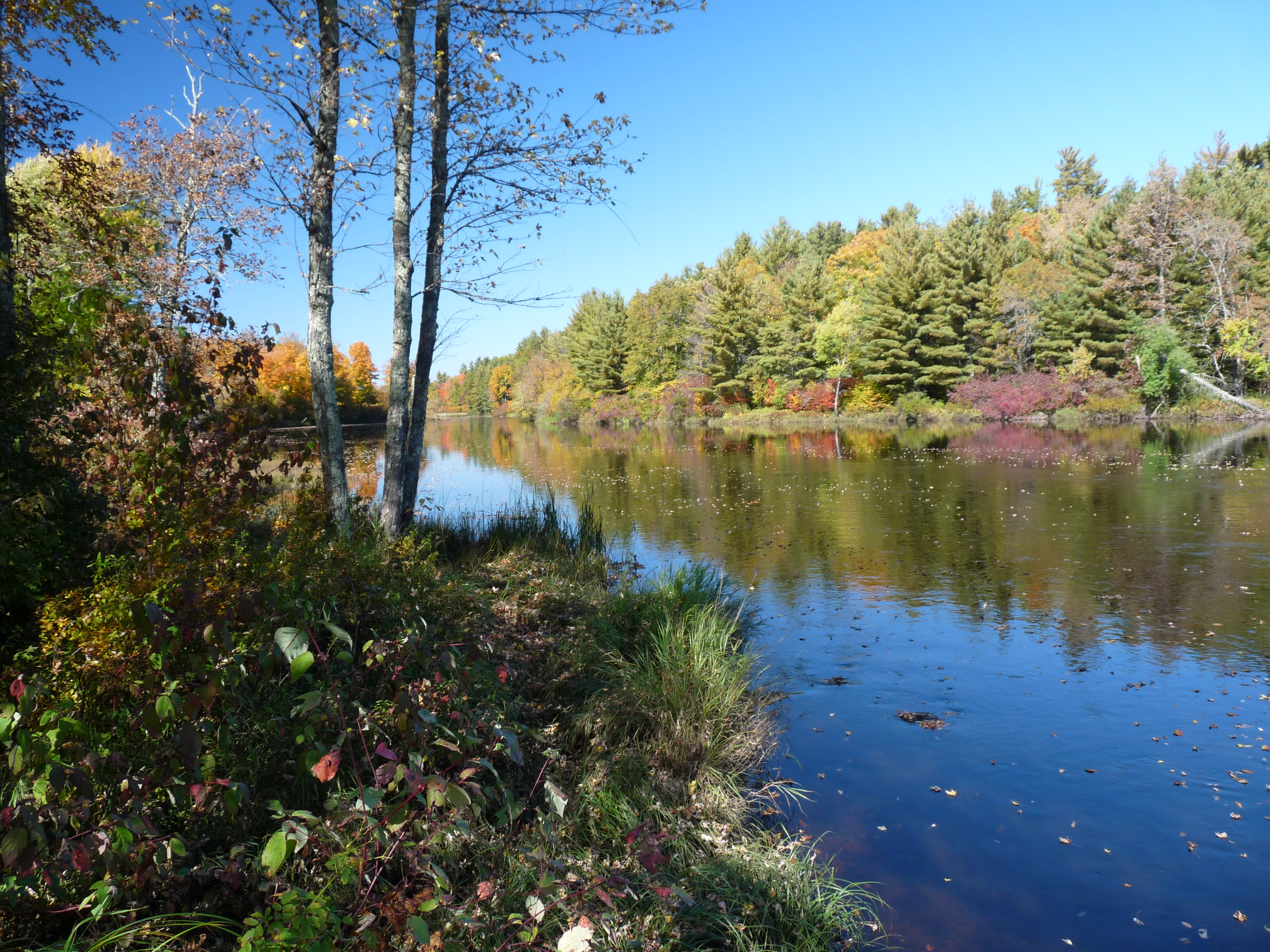
- The North Fork, between Park Falls and Oxbo

Location
- Country: United States
- State: Wisconsin

Physical characteristics
- Source: Turtle-Flambeau Flowage
  - location: Iron County, Wisconsin
  - coordinates: 46.076°N 90.030°W
  - elevation: 1,060 feet (320 m)
- 2nd source: Round Lake
  - location: Price County, Wisconsin
  - coordinates: 45.93°N 90.08°W
  - elevation: 1,549 feet (472 m)
- Mouth
  - location: Rusk County, Wisconsin
  - coordinates: 45.30°N 91.23°W
- Basin size: 1,860 square miles (4,800 km^{2})

The Flambeau River is a tributary of the Chippewa River in northern Wisconsin, United States. Naturalist Aldo Leopold wrote that his father deemed all good camp spots, fishing spots, and woods "nearly as good as the Flambeau." The river remains notable among canoeists in the Midwest for outstanding canoe camping, including excellent scenery, fishing and whitewater.

In the 1800s, before railroads and highways, loggers drove masses of pine logs from the forests of northern Wisconsin down the Flambeau to sawmills at Chippewa Falls, Eau Claire and other places. Since then, segments of the river have been dammed to generate electricity, offering different recreation opportunities than the free-flowing segments.

== Geography ==
The Flambeau River rises in two major forks—the North Fork and the South Fork. Both originate in north-central Wisconsin and flow generally southwest to their confluence, then continue as the main Flambeau, also southwesterly, to the mouth at the Chippewa River near Holcombe, Wisconsin. The North Fork is formed by the confluence of the Manitowish and Bear rivers just above Turtle-Flambeau Flowage (reservoir). The South Fork's source is Round Lake in northeastern Price County, Wisconsin.

Major tributaries of the Flambeau include the Turtle River, flowing into the North Fork in the Turtle-Flambeau Flowage, and the Elk River, which flows into the South Fork. Swamp Creek is the largest of 23 streams flowing into the Flambeau River.

The communities of Park Falls and Oxbo are located along the North Fork. Fifield and Lugerville lie on the South Fork. Ladysmith is the only city on the main Flambeau. Generally the river flows through remote areas dominated by second-growth forest, with few road crossings or approaches.

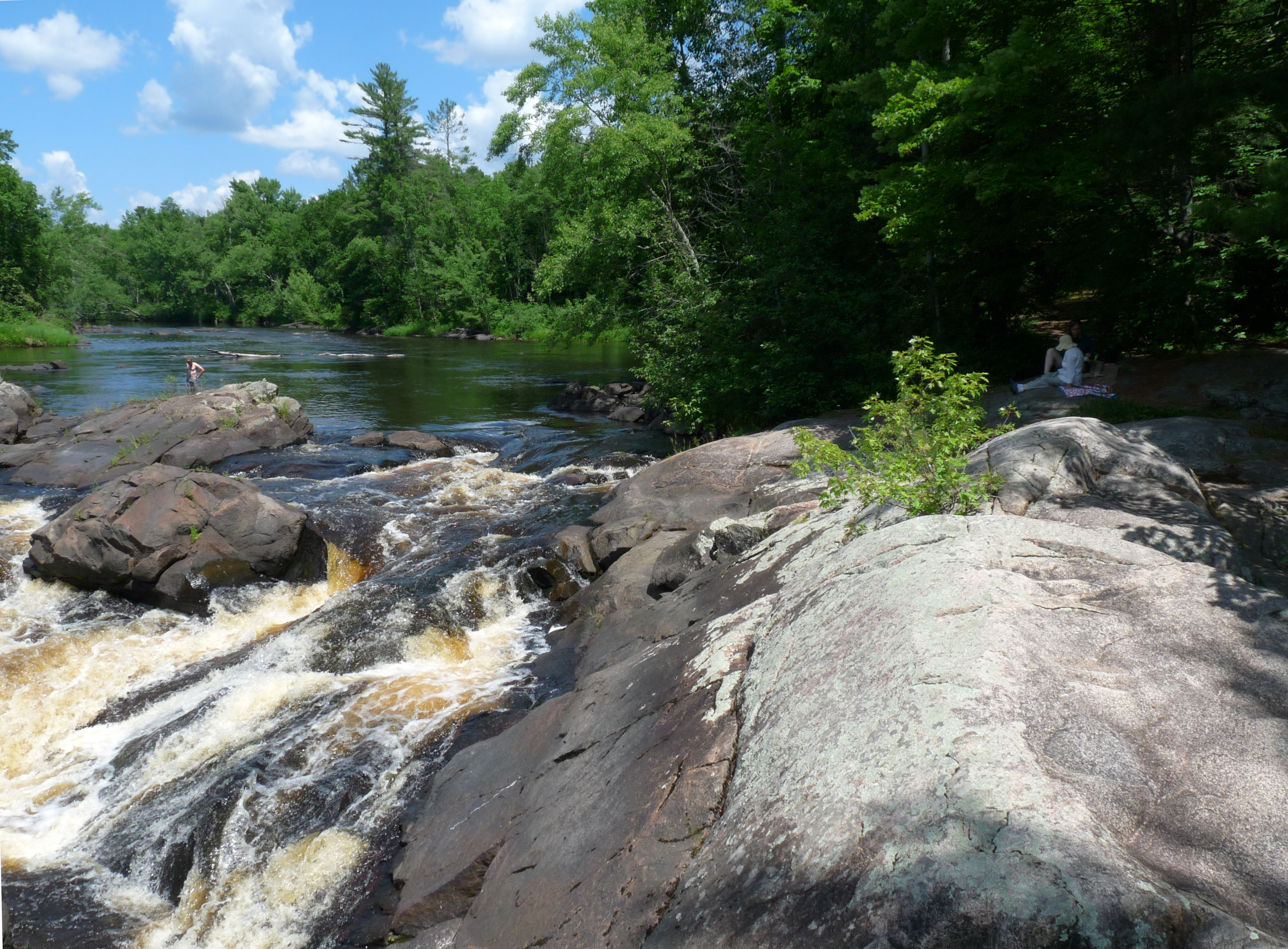
Little Falls on the south fork

While the South Fork is free-flowing below a small dam at the outlet of Round Lake, the North Fork and the main river have several dams that impound small reservoirs, known locally as flowages. Below the dam impounding the Turtle-Flambeau Flowage, the North Fork has three dams between Park Falls and Oxbo. On the main Flambeau below the Forks, there are four more dams: Big Falls Dam, Rural Electric Agency Dam (Dairyland Reservoir), Ladysmith (Papermill Dam), (the Port Arthur Dam until it was removed), and the Thornapple Dam.

== History ==
=== Indians, traders and names ===
Indians traveled up and down the Flambeau before there were roads through the forests of northern Wisconsin, hunting and fishing along it. An archeological dig at Deadman Slough shows that Paleo-Indians camped along the North Fork shortly after the last glacier receded, about 11,000 years ago. Ojibwe dominated the area when white fur traders arrived in the 1600s, until the US forced them to cede most of their land rights in the White Pine Treaty of 1837.

The name flambeau means "torch" in French. Many place names in Wisconsin have French origins due to the early French explorers, trappers and traders in the region in the colonial era. A common interpretation is that early explorers saw the local Ojibwe (Chippewa) people fishing at night by torchlight.

In Ojibwe the North Fork of the Flambeau River is called Waaswaagani-ziibi (Torch-light River), as it flows from Lac du Flambeau, known in Ojibwe as Waaswaagani-zaaga'igan (Lake of the Torch Light). The South Fork is known in Ojibwe as the Omashkoozo-ziibi (Elk River or "he that runs in a waddling type of way" River). After the North Fork and the South Fork join, the river is known in Ojibwe as Manidoowiish-ziibi (Little Spirit [small animals] River).

=== Early logging ===
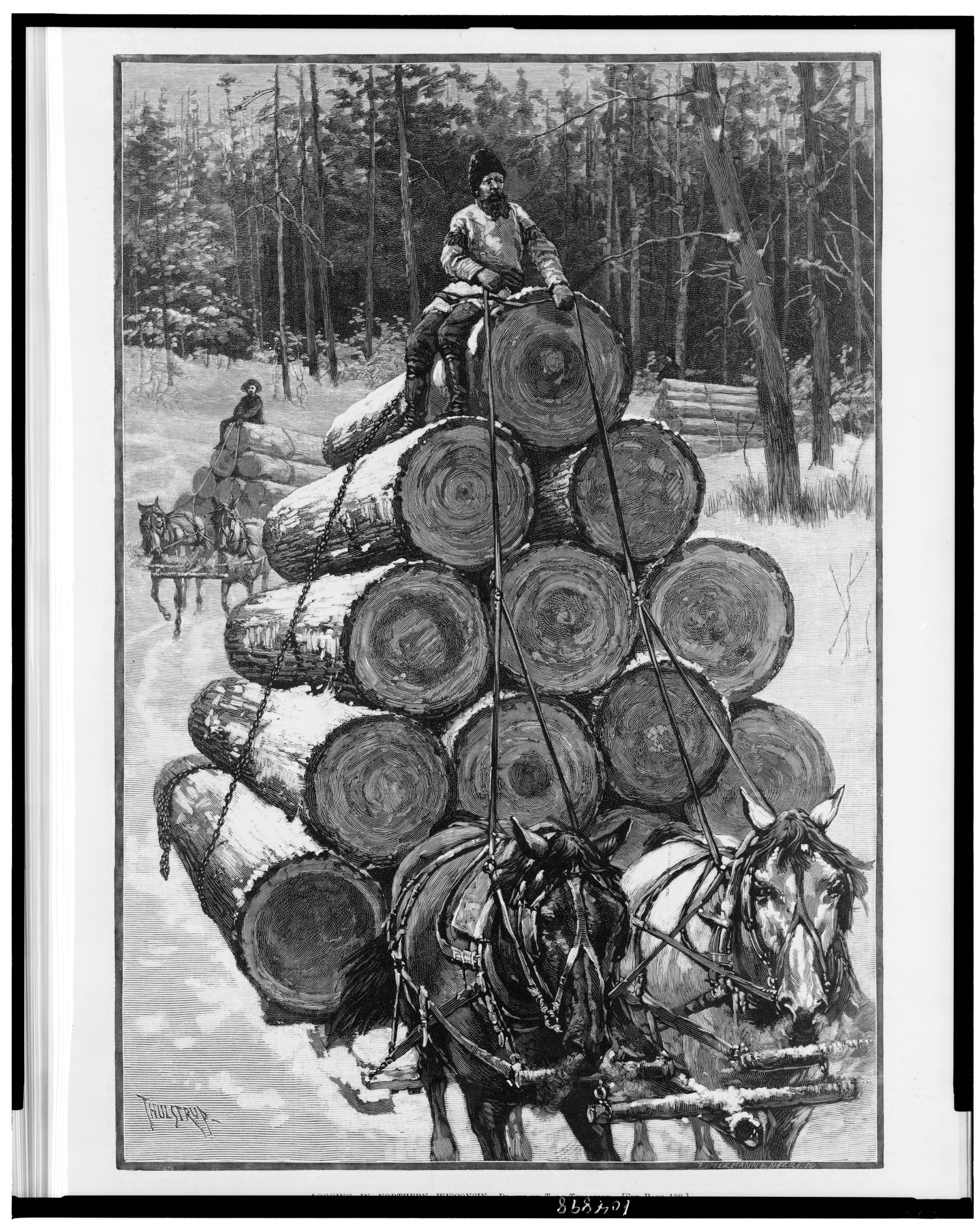

Large-scale logging operations began on the Flambeau around the 1860s. About 1864 the Daniel Shaw Company of Eau Claire built a permanent staging area called Flambeau Farm where the Flambeau meets the Chippewa above modern Holcombe. Crews toiled from there up the river to cut out logging camps in the wilderness - sometimes poling supplies up in keelboats - sometimes carting them on a tote-road that followed the river. Then, mostly in winter, lumberjacks living in the camps walked out into nearby forests and chopped down pine trees, sawed them into logs generally 16-feet long, and sledded them to the banks of any river or stream large enough to float logs. There they were stacked until spring. When the water rose, they rolled the logs into the river and log-driving crews followed them down with the current, racing to break up log jams before they grew. At the end of the drive, the logs were generally caught in booms near sawmills.

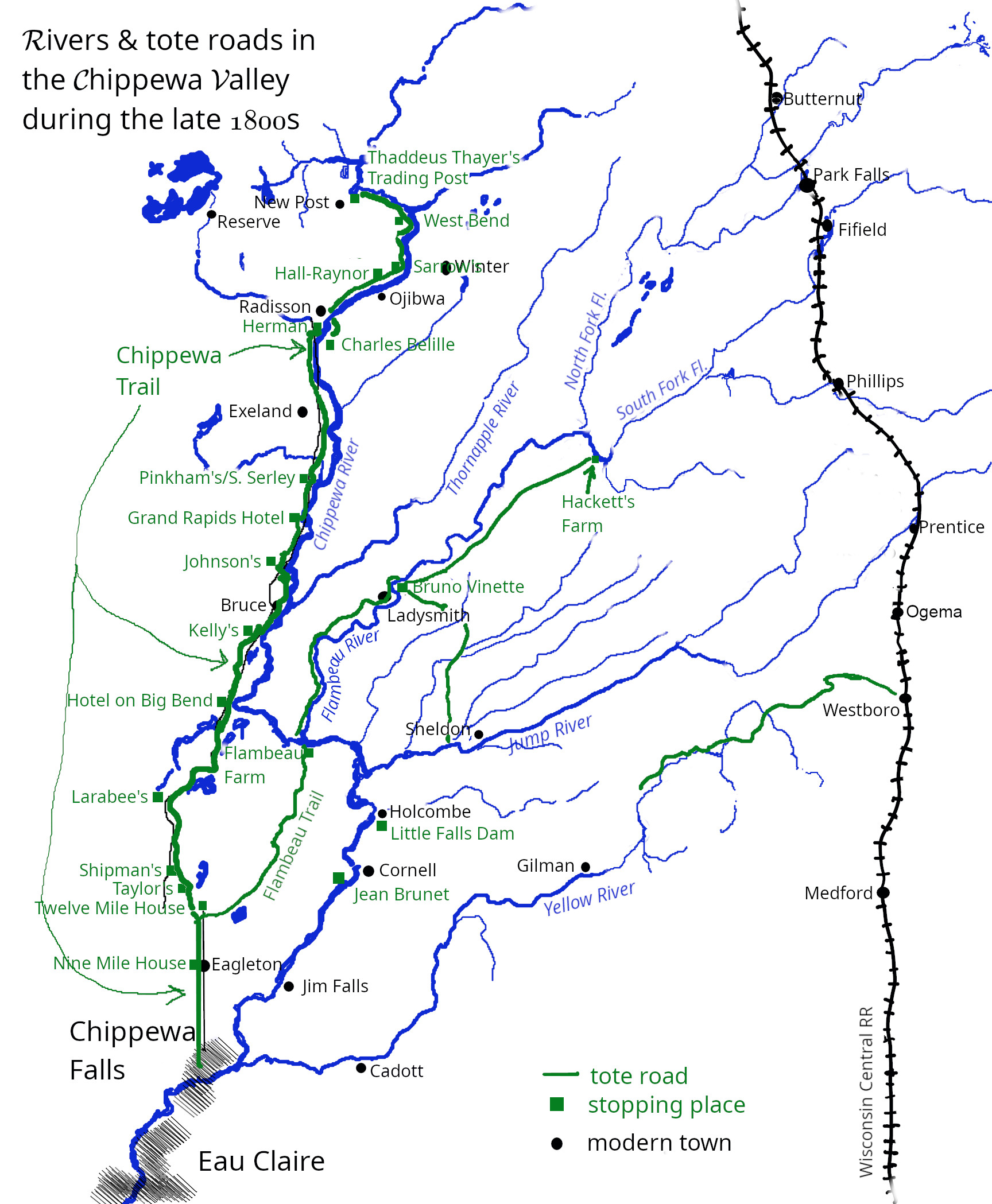
Tote roads and stopping places

As mentioned above, many of the logging operations were supplied via Flambeau Farm at the mouth of the Flambeau. That outpost provided sleeping quarters for the Shaw company's own men, a hotel for river travelers, a wanigan where necessities could be bought, and a mixed community of whites and Indians who did the work. From there a ferry crossed the Chippewa to a tote road heading up the west bank - the Flambeau Road.

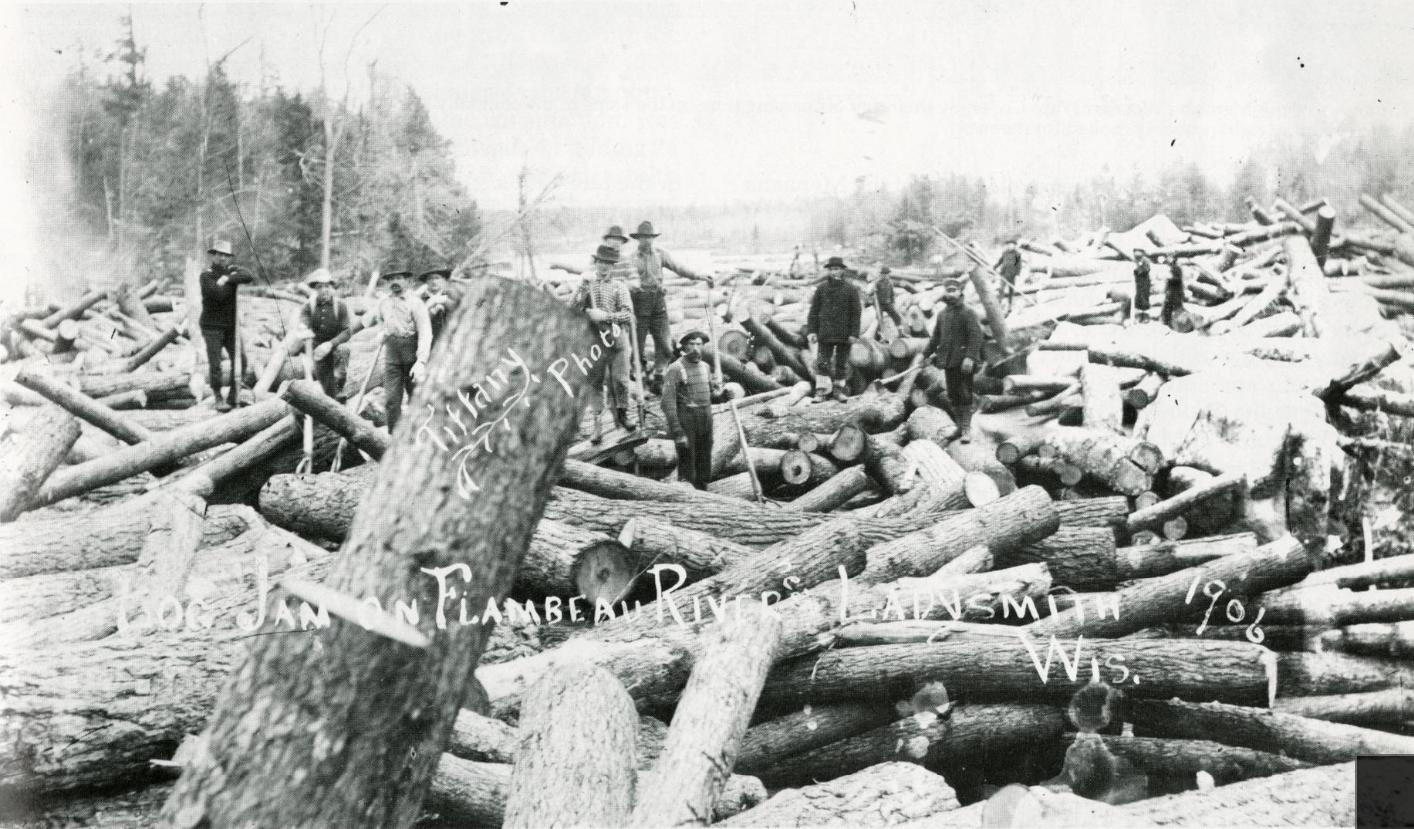
Log jam on the Flambeau - probably at Little Falls on the South Fork in April 1906

By 1872 the frontier had moved 20 miles up the Flambeau. Bruno Vinette had a farm on the river above what would become Ladysmith, where he grew food to supply his logging camps and where he kept his oxen and horses in summer. Later he added a ferry, a hotel for river-men, and a small jail for those made unruly by the liquor he sold. In 1872 a new logging camp was built 20 miles above Vinette's at Hackett's Farm, on the Flambeau's South Fork. Most of the lumberjacks on the lower Flambeau and its tributaries came upstream through Flambeau Farm. After the Wisconsin Central Railroad reached the upper Flambeau in the 1870s, many lumberjacks on the South Fork came down from Fifield and those on the North Fork from Park Falls. The Flambeau Road tote road eventually connected to Park Falls and was also called the 101 Trail.

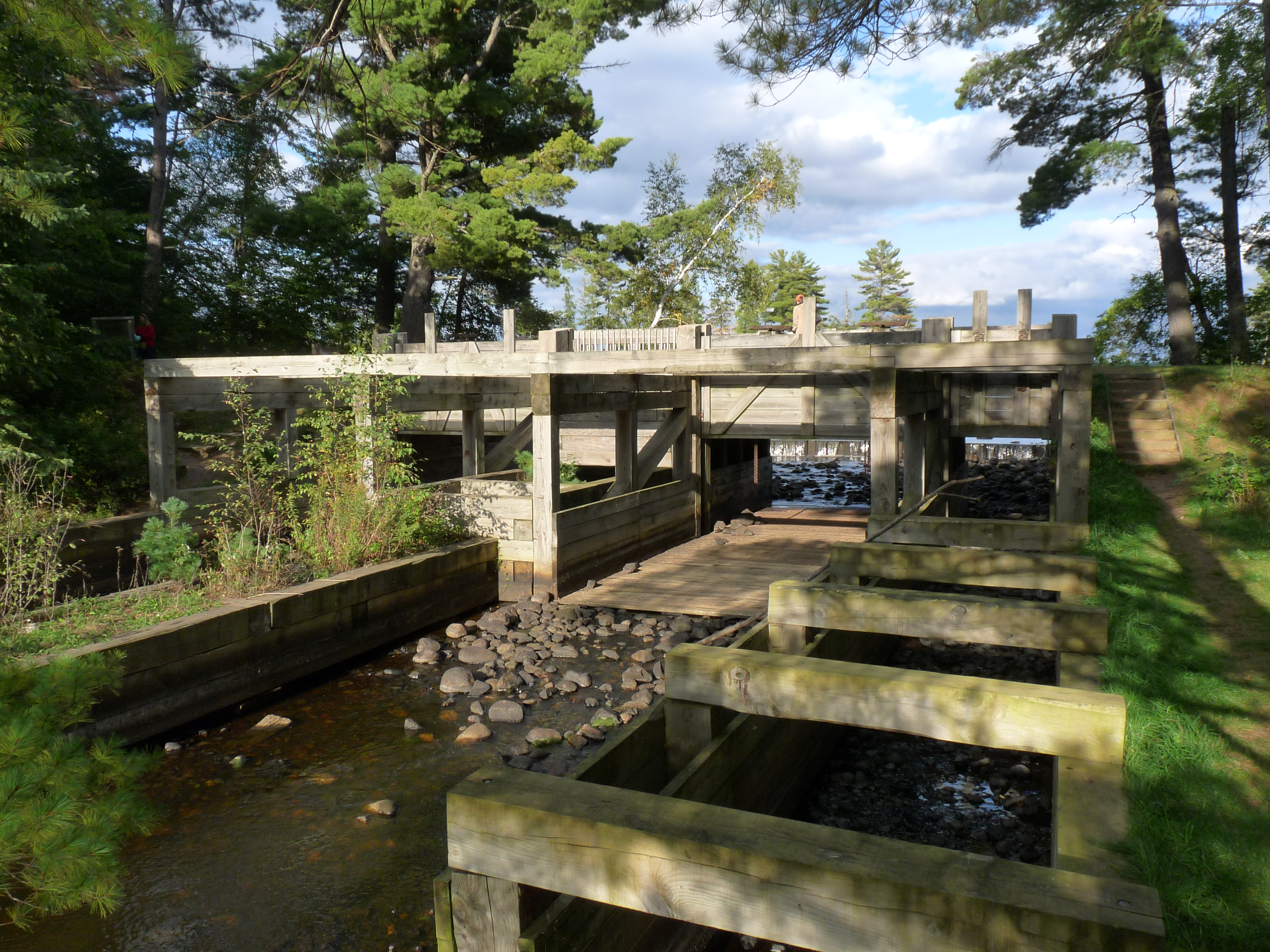
The Round Lake Logging Dam was built in 1878 at the head of the South Fork to support log drives on the river. It has been reconstructed as close as possible to the original, and is the only remaining log-driving dam in Wisconsin.

Tributaries of the Flambeau also carried logs out of the forest. For example on the South Fork, Skinner Creek, Price Creek, Sailor Creek, Hay Creek, Squaw Creek, and the Elk River and its tributaries were logged. To drive logs on these smaller streams and even the rivers, loggers cleared overhanging trees, blasted boulders, fortified stream banks, and built driving dams. These driving dams were opened as needed to raise water levels downstream and push logs to the sawmills even when there was no natural flood. The south fork, for example, had log-driving dams at Sugarbush, the outlet of Round Lake, the lower Elk River, and the upper Elk.

Pine logging in the Chippewa Valley peaked around 1890 and the big mills in Chippewa and Eau Claire stopped huge-scale sawing around 1900, but log drives continued to smaller sawmills at places like Fifield and Ladysmith. They continued sawing for local use and to ship lumber out on the railroad until around 1910, at least. Driving logs on the rivers ended with depletion of white pine. Logging of hardwood has continued ever since, but the denser wood doesn't float well, so it is hauled out with trains and trucks.

=== Industrialization beyond river-logging ===
Around 1890 Henry Sherry built a dam and pulp (paper) mill on the North Fork at what would become Park Falls. In 1901 Menasha Wooden Ware built a dam at Ladysmith to generate electricity for their mill. Menasha Paper built a pulp and paper mill there shortly after. The dam that created the Turtle-Flambeau Flowage on the north fork was built in 1926, aiming to protect against floods and provide a steady flow of water to the dams downstream. The Big Falls hydro dam was built above Ladysmith in 1922 and the Dairyland dam in 1950, both generating electricity and creating flowages, but also submerging beautiful stretches of the river.

In his A Sand County Almanac, Aldo Leopold mourned the loss of a scenic section of the Flambeau to the Dairyland Power Dam above Ladysmith. He feared that the state legislature's approval had set a precedent which would sacrifice much of the wild Flambeau for hydro-electric dams, but much of the wild river remains.

=== Flambeau River State Forest ===
In the 1920s, after the virgin forest was cut and farming the northern cutover was proving difficult, a group led by Judge A.K. Owens of Phillips pushed to preserve wild land along the Flambeau River. In 1929 the Wisconsin Conservation Department bought 3,112 acres, and more in the years that followed. In 1930 it was named Flambeau River State Forest. Canoe campsites and a headquarters were developed in the early years; then in the 1950s and 1960s larger campgrounds Lake of the Pines and Connors Lake and a larger headquarters were added. Today the forest totals 90,000 acres.

== Modern recreation ==
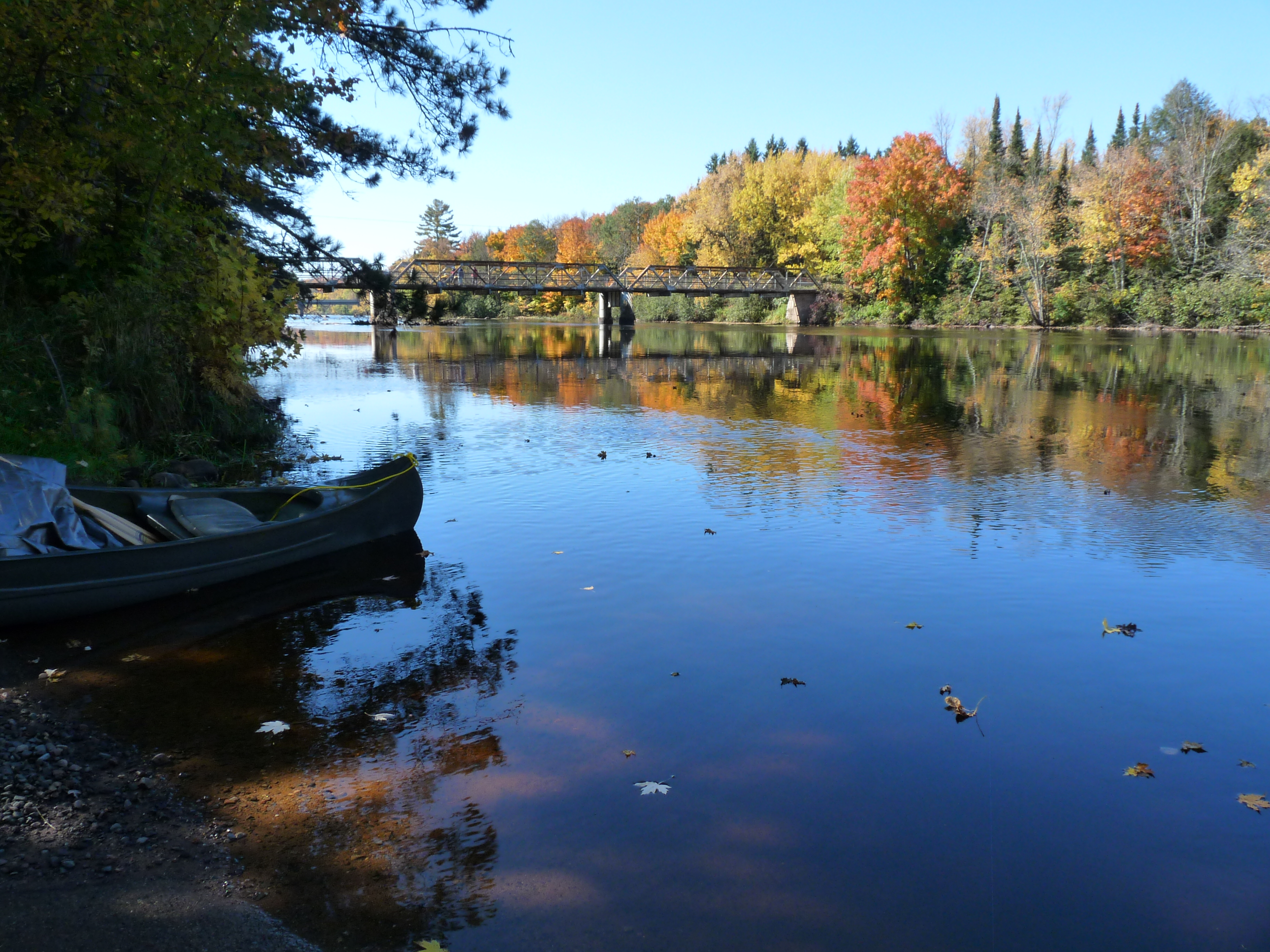
Looking downstream from Dix-Dox landing at Oxbo

Anglers fish both the flowages and the river sections of the Flambeau, fishing for northern pike, smallmouth bass, muskellunge, walleye, Black crappie, bluegill, lake sturgeon, channel catfish, suckers, redhorse, and other species. Lake sturgeon are considered a "species of concern," and greater redhorse are "threatened."

Canoeists find the Flambeau to be one of the best rivers in northern Wisconsin, with whitewater rapids alternating with calm pools, a reliable current, rustic campsites, and miles of wild scenery. The river and its forks offer a variety of possible trip lengths from short day outings, to overnight camping, to voyages of a week or more. The river offers a variety of experiences, ranging from totally flat flowages, to stretches with easy rapids for beginners, to stretches with Class 3 rapids like Cedar Rapids and Beaver Dam Rapids. Little Falls on the South Fork should be portaged around by everyone except daredevils. Some sections of the river are protected from development, flowing through the Flambeau River State Forest.

Hiking, biking, skiing and snowshoeing can be done in the Flambeau River State Forest at the Flambeau Hills trails along the river south of Oxbo and at Lake of the Pines. At Little Falls and Slough Gundy north of Hawkins you can hike the trails and in low water, scramble across the rocks in the river.

== See also ==
- See Logging on the Chippewa for an overview of 19th century logging in the Chippewa watershed.
- List of rivers in Wisconsin
