= Swamp Creek (Wisconsin) =

River in Wisconsin, United States

Coordinates: 46°03′12″N 90°17′16″W

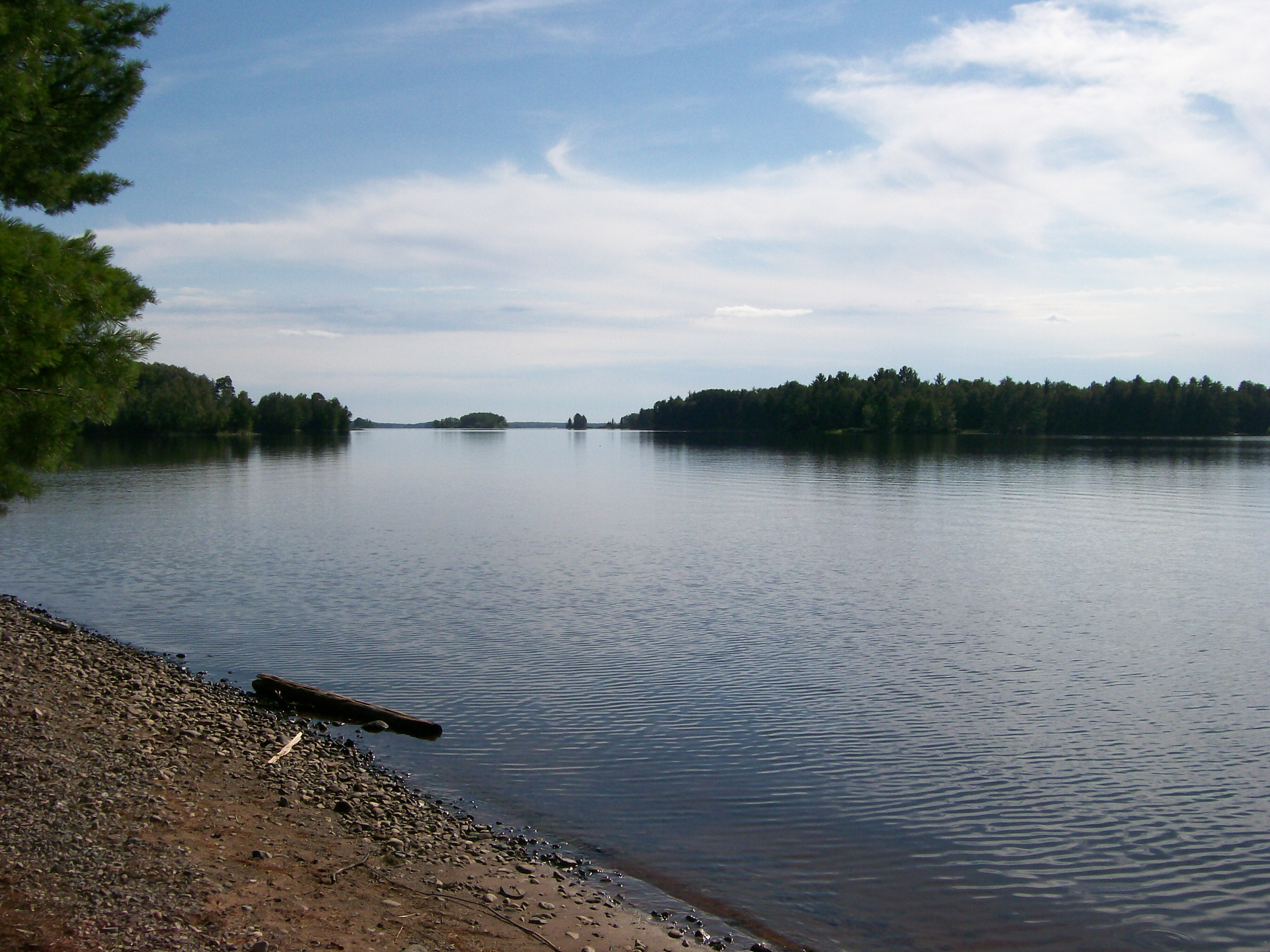
The Turtle-Flambeau Flowage, pictured here, is located near Swamp Creek in the Flambeau River's northern watershed.

Swamp Creek is a tributary of the Flambeau River in northern Wisconsin, United States. The Flambeau is in turn a tributary of the Chippewa River.

Swamp Creek is the largest of 23 streams which flow into the Flambeau River, and one of a few which have a dam. The other remaining tributaries of the Flambeau River are fairly small, but many support trout populations.

The Flambeau River rises in two major forks—the North Fork and the South Fork. Swamp Creek is located in the watershed of the North Fork, which is near the Turtle-Flambeau Flowage in Iron County. Swamp Creek is one of four other named creeks in the watershed of the North Fork, the others being Bosner Creek, Smith Creek, and Sixmile Creek.

Forest Wander Lake 17 is a 39-acre impoundment of Swamp Creek in Iron County.

Most of Swamp Creek is classified as a Class II Trout Stream. Streams in this classification may have some natural reproduction, but not enough to utilize available food and space. Therefore, stocking is required to maintain a desirable sport fishery. These streams have good survival and carryover of adult trout, often producing some fish larger than average size. There are 5,911.6 miles of Class 2 trout streams in Wisconsin and they comprise 45% of Wisconsin's total trout stream mileage.
