= Oxbo, Wisconsin =

- Unincorporated community
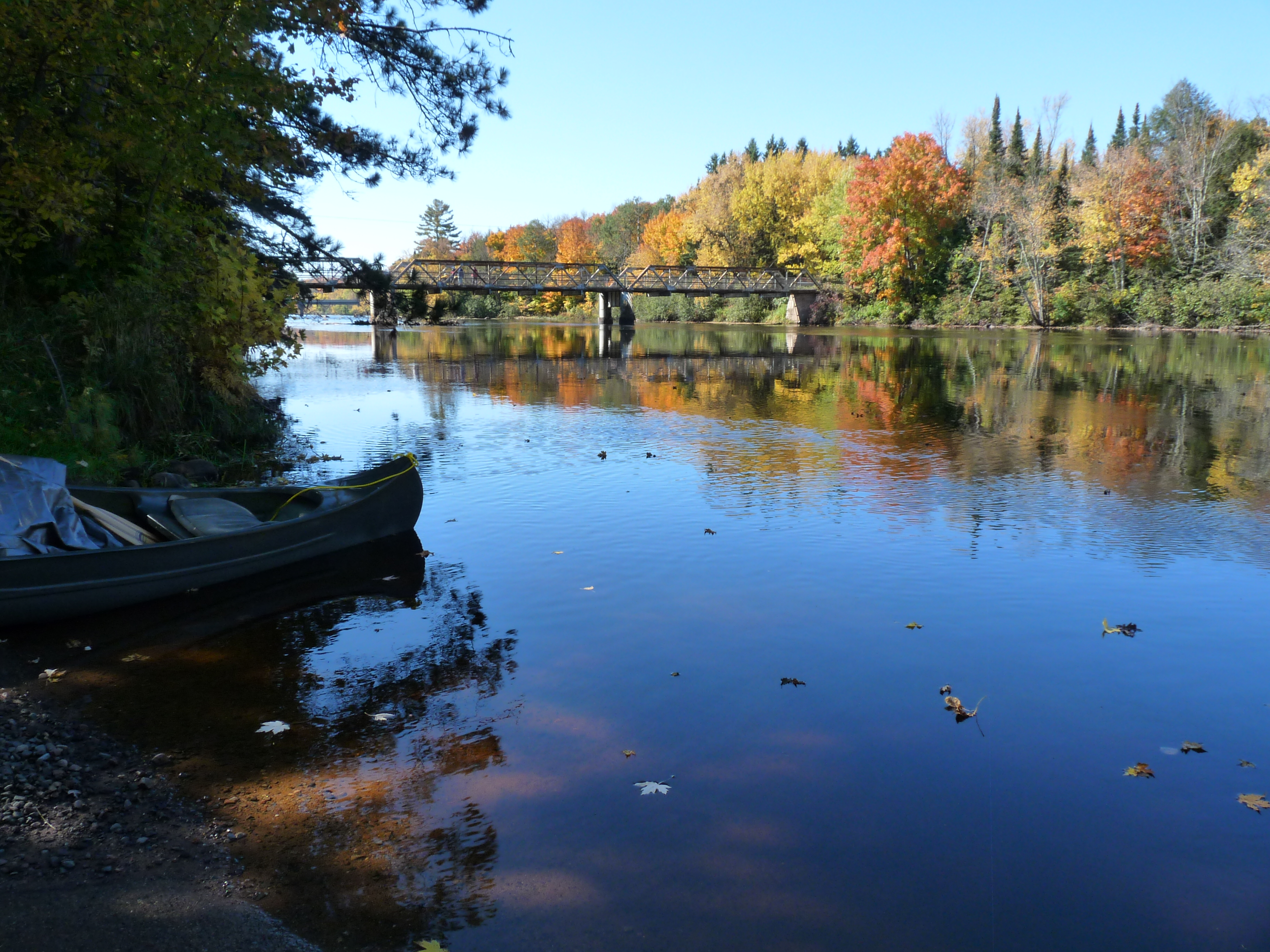

- Location within Wisconsin Location within the United States
- Coordinates: 45°51′46″N 90°42′16″W
- Country: United States
- State: Wisconsin
- County: Sawyer
- Elevation: 1,371 ft (418 m)
- Time zone: UTC-6 (Central (CST))
  - Summer (DST): UTC-5 (CDT)
- Area codes: 715 & 534
- GNIS feature ID: 1570973

Oxbo is an unincorporated community in the town of Draper, Sawyer County, Wisconsin, United States. Oxbo is located on the Flambeau River and Wisconsin Highway 70, 13.5 miles (21.7 km) west-southwest of Park Falls.
