= Connors Lake =

- Location within Wisconsin Location within the United States
- Location: Sawyer County, Wisconsin
- Coordinates: 45.751351°N 90.737377°W
- Type: Drainage lake
- Basin countries: United States
- Surface area: 3,585 acres (14.51 km^{2})
- Max. depth: 82 ft (25 m)
- Surface elevation: 1,390 ft (420 m)

Connors Lake is a lake in Sawyer County, Wisconsin, United States. It is located in the Flambeau River State Forest. The lake covers an area of 429 acres (1.74 km^{2}) and reaches a maximum depth of 82 ft (25 m). Fish species enzootic to Connors Lake include bluegill, largemouth bass, muskellunge, smallmouth bass, and walleye.
