= Forest History Center =

Forestry museum in Grand Rapids, Minnesota

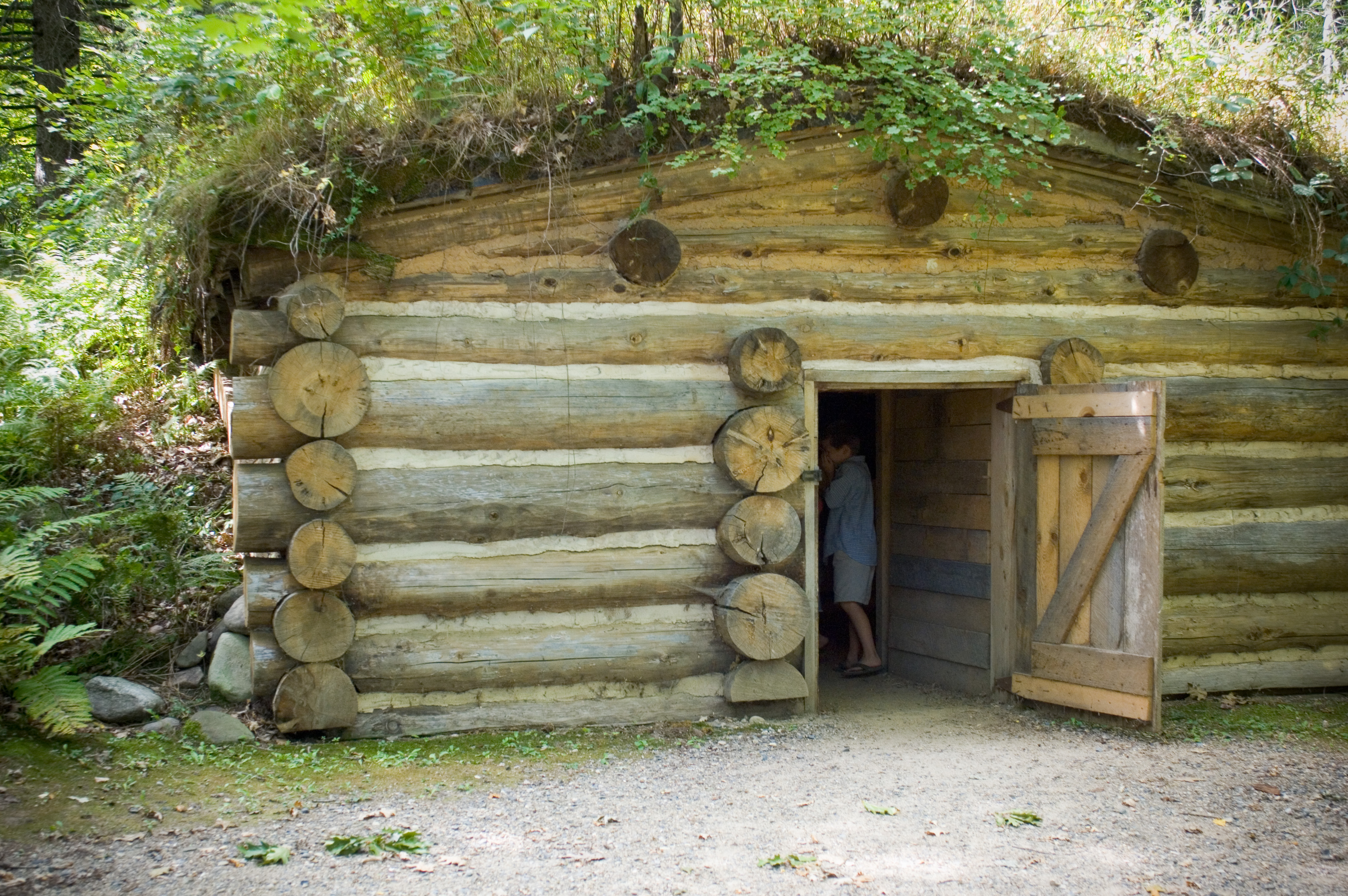
- Sod-roofed cabin at the Forest History Center

- Location of Forest History Center
- Location: Near U.S. Hwys 169 and 2 Grand Rapids, Minnesota
- Coordinates: 47.2300°N 93.5662°W
- Type: Open-air
- Website: www.mnhs.org/foresthistory

The Forest History Center is part of the Minnesota Historical Society's network of historic sites and museums. Located in Grand Rapids, Itasca County, Minnesota, on wooded acreage adjoining the Mississippi River, the Forest History Center provides learning experiences about the forests, logging industry, and forest conservation. The historical and changing relationship between the people and the forest is displayed through exhibits and films, demonstrations, a living history lumber camp, an original 1934 fire tower, and nature trails. The Forest History Center has regular special events, and offers various programs for school field trips.

== Features ==
=== Visitor Center ===
The Visitor Center is the entrances to the site. The building includes multimedia forestry exhibits of the earliest recorded history to modern times, has sensory displays for children, a small theater showing "Fire in the Forest" (a film about the 1918 Cloquet and Moose Lake fire), and a museum store.

=== Logging Camp ===
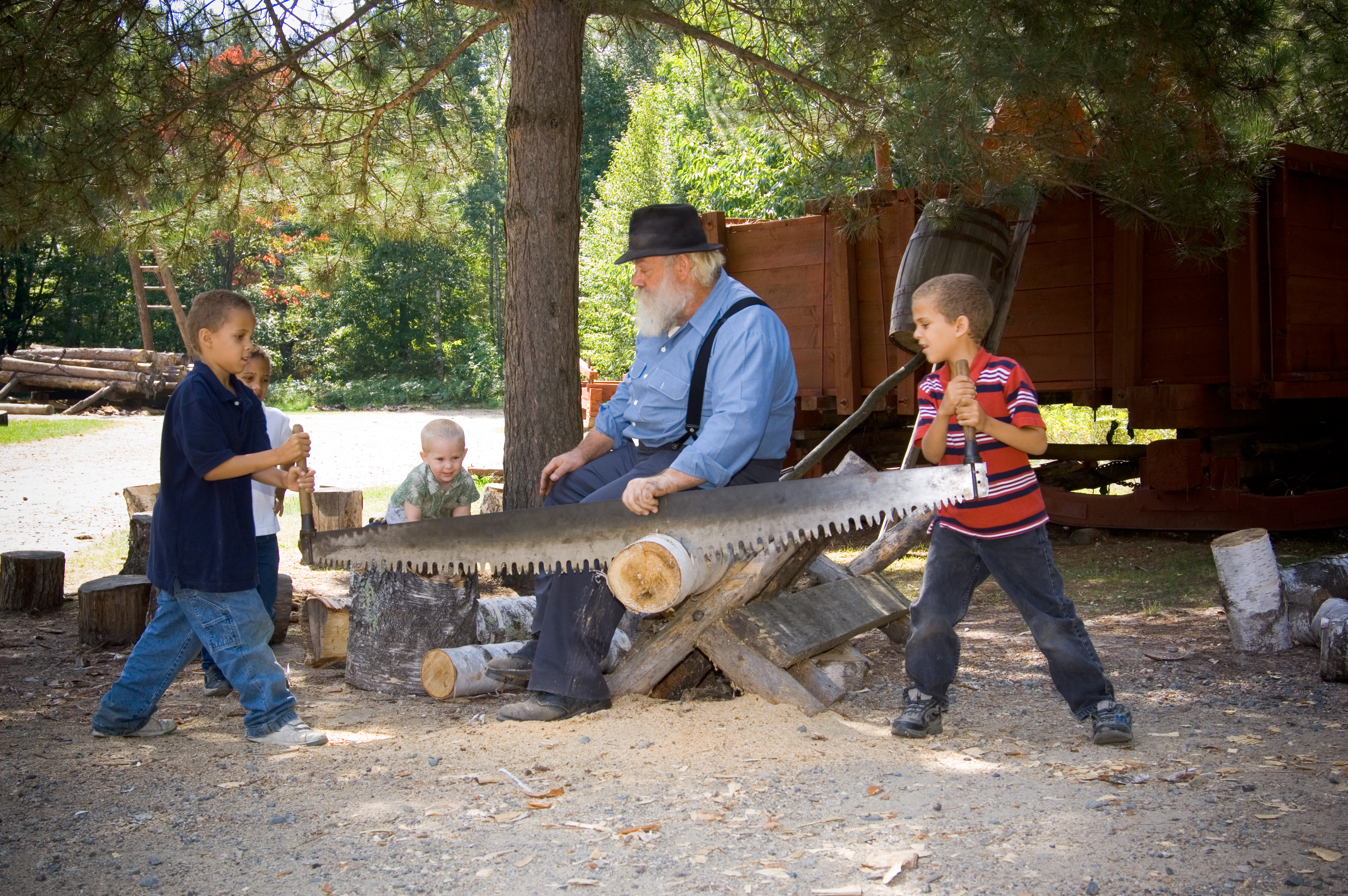
Saw

The Logging Camp is a re-creation of a typical logging camp of 1900. Buildings include a bunkhouse, cook house, blacksmith shop, horse barn, and outhouse. Costumed interpreters reenact logging camp processes as well as interact with visitors and tell stories. Visitors may choose to follow a tour, or use a self-guided brochure.

=== River Wanigan ===
The river wanigan is a 1901 replica of a floating cook shack and bunkhouse once used by river drivers when moving logs down river to the mills. Visitors may walk a short distance from the camp to the river where it is moored.

=== Fire Tower and Forest Service Cabin ===
Forest Lookout Tower is an original structure built in 1934 by the Civilian Conservation Corps, and moved on location. It is 100 feet high, and visitors over the age of six are allowed to climb it. The forest service cabin and tool shed are reproductions of what were used to house patrolmen and by fire fighting crews during the 1930s.

=== Trails ===
Surrounding the Forest History Center are three hiking trails, totaling five miles, that provide opportunities for wildlife watching. The Swamp Trail is an elevated gravel trail and boardwalk through a cedar and black spruce swamp and a tamarack bog. The River Trail has informational signposts for tree identification. The Forest of Today Trail leads through aspen stands, hardwoods, old-growth and red pine, and a plantation of genetically improved tree stands. During the winter, Northern Lights Nordic Ski Club maintains a 4 km cross-county ski trail through the logging camp and virgin timber.
