= Flambeau River State Forest =

State Forest in Sawyer, Price and Rusk counties Wisconsin

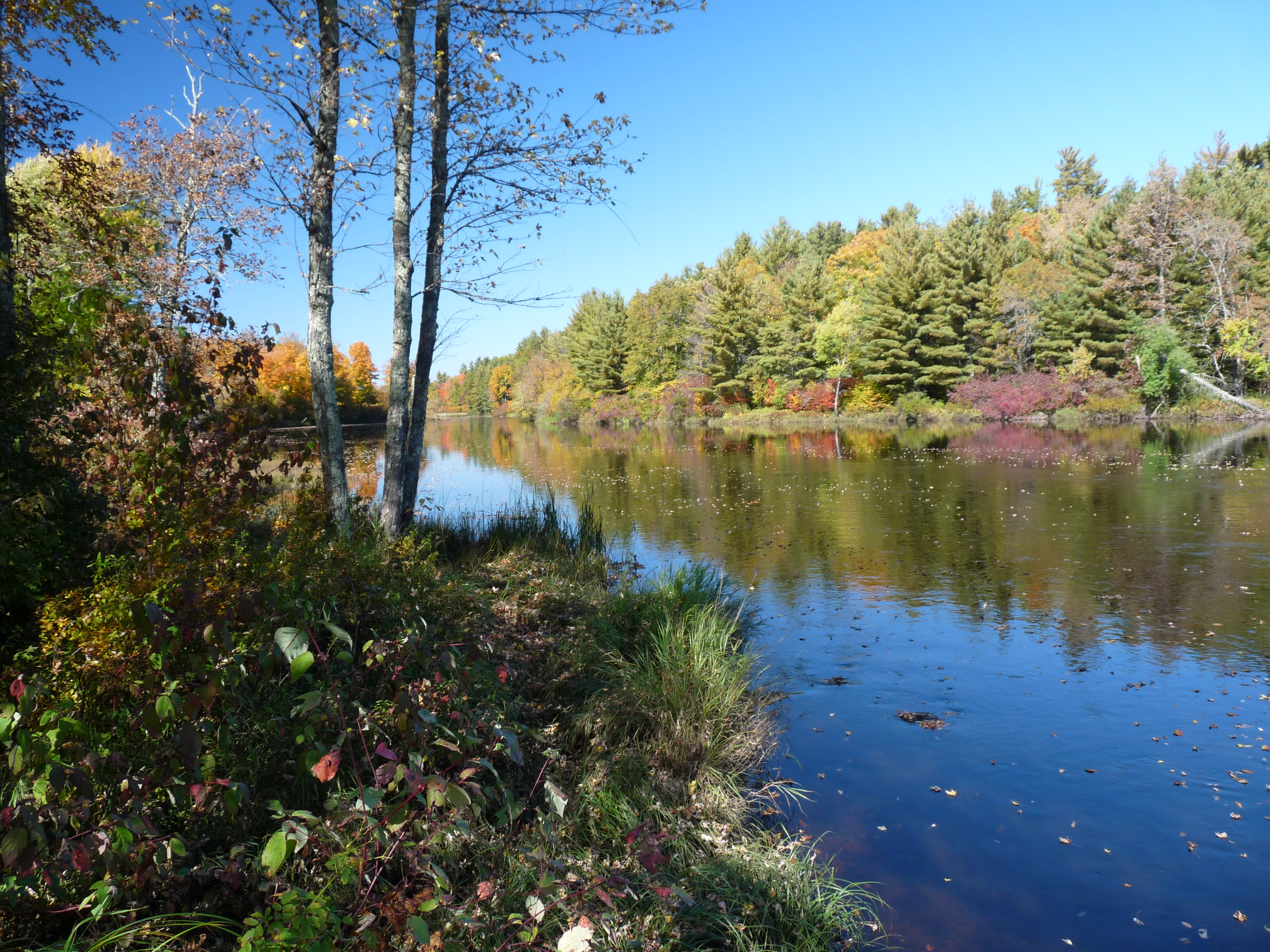

- Location within Wisconsin Location within the United States
- Interactive map of Flambeau River State Forest
- Location: Sawyer, Price, and Rusk counties, Wisconsin, United States
- Coordinates: 45°46′53″N 90°42′36″W
- Area: 90,147 acres (36,481 ha)
- Elevation: 1,391 ft (424 m)
- Established: 1931
- Administrator: Wisconsin Department of Natural Resources
- Website: Official website
- Wisconsin State Forests

U.S. National Natural Landmark
- Designated: 1973

Flambeau River State Forest is a 90,147 acre (364 km^{2}) unit of the Wisconsin state park system. The North and South Forks of the Flambeau River join within the park, providing over 75 miles (121 km) of mostly undeveloped river. The state forest is generally northern mesic, but includes a variety of river, lakes, bogs and various plant communities.

In 1973 a section of old-growth conifers and hardwoods - the Flambeau River Hemlock-Hardwood Forest - was designated as a National Natural Landmark by the National Park Service.

== History ==
Before logging and settlement, the Flambeau flowed mostly through an ancient forest of mixed hardwood and pine that covered much of north central Wisconsin. Indians and fur traders paddled its waters. In 1877 F.L. King surveyed the lower Flambeau river valley and found the dominant trees to be white pine, hemlock and yellow birch, with patches of spruce and balsam. He wrote, "Black alder and kinnickinnic (Cornus stolonifera) fringe the streams, and upon some of the flats, small black ash, elm, and soft maple grow." Of those species, the white pine was the most prized. After growing for 250 or 400 years, the largest white pines in northern Wisconsin stood 250 feet tall with diameters of 5 to 8.5 feet.

Logging had begun on the middle Flambeau River by 1872, with pine timber cut in the lands along the river and its tributaries, sawed into 16-foot logs, then floated down the river on spring floods to sawmills - mostly in Chippewa Falls and Eau Claire. When the pine was exhausted, hardwoods were logged. After repeated rounds of logging, lumber companies and land speculators hoped that farmers would take over the remaining brush as happened to the south, but many of the farms this far north failed. Wildfires ripped through the treetops left by loggers, threatening the remaining settlers and timber.

In the 1920s a group of locals led by Judge A.K. Owens of Phillips began pushing to preserve a block of land along the Flambeau River. The Wisconsin Conservation Department bought an initial 3,112-acre tract in 1929 and the Flambeau River State Forest was established in 1930. In subsequent years the Conservation Department bought more cutover land from lumber companies. Until the 1950s, the development in the forest amounted to some river campsites and a picnic area. Then in the 1950s the headquarters building on County W was built from blown-down hemlock. Soon after, the campgrounds at Connors Lake and Lake of the Pines were developed.

The DNR manages the state forest to preserve a wilderness experience along the Flambeau River, including big trees of the different species, but it manages other parts of the forest for timber. About 1500 acres of timber are cut most years - mostly selection cuts, and mostly in winter when logging equipment disturbs the frozen ground less. The DNR revises the FRSF's management plan every 20 years, taking public input into consideration.

== Big block ==
The Big Block was a section of old-growth forest south of Connors Lake and east of the Flambeau, including large hardwoods and a few very large pines - one of only a few remnants of virgin forest left in Wisconsin. On July 4, 1977 an unusual windstorm swept through the area and flattened most of the trees in the Big Block. Some of the blown-down timber was salvaged, but the area is now largely left unmanaged, to study how an old-growth forest grows back after a blowdown. A few big trees survived the windstorm, including a stand of hemlock and yellow birch on the east-central shore of Lake of the Pines.

"The Big White Pine" was the ambassador for old growth forest in the FRSF - 130 feet tall, with a base diameter of four feet two inches, and over 300 years old. It was a short stroll in from a good road. It survived the 1977 windstorm, but had become hollow and unstable due to "lightning strikes, insect infestations, and disease." It was cut in 2000 and a 16-foot log from it can now be seen at the state forest headquarters on County W.

== State Natural Areas ==
Several diverse Wisconsin SNAs lie within Flambeau River State Forest:

- Bass Lake Peatlands: an open peatland around Bass Lake, with hummocks of sphagnum moss and scattered black spruce and tamarack.

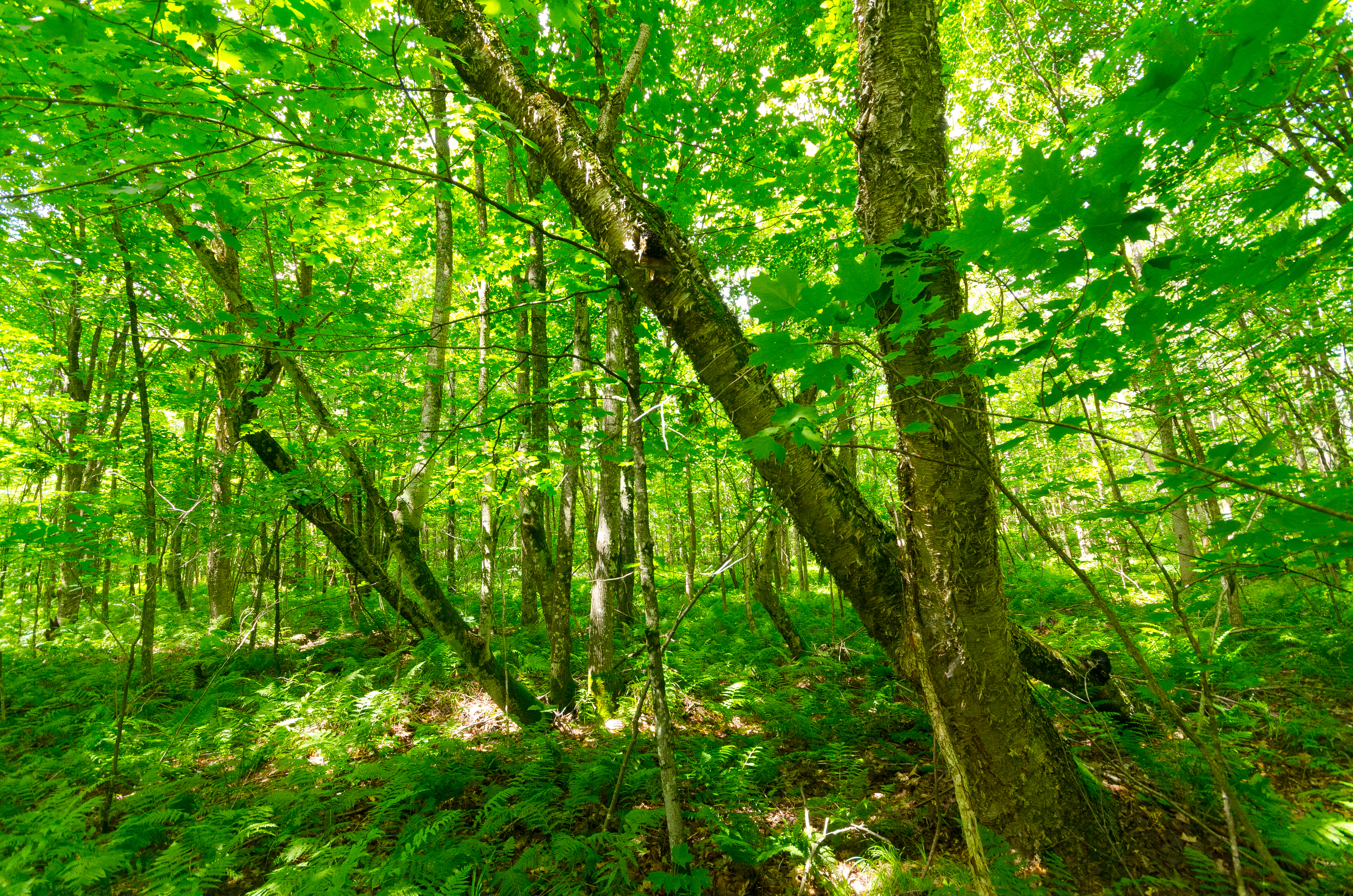
Flambeau River Hardwood Forest

- Flambeau River Hardwood Forest: a northern mesic forest between Big Block Road and the Flambeau River. It was old-growth until it was mostly felled by the 1977 windstorm.
- Hanson Lake Wetlands: a mosaic of wetland communities around undeveloped Hanson Lake, between Payne Farm Road and the Flambeau's north fork, including various bogs and spruce swamps, hosting creatures like bog rosemary, pitcher plants, black-throated green warbler, ovenbirds and gray jays.

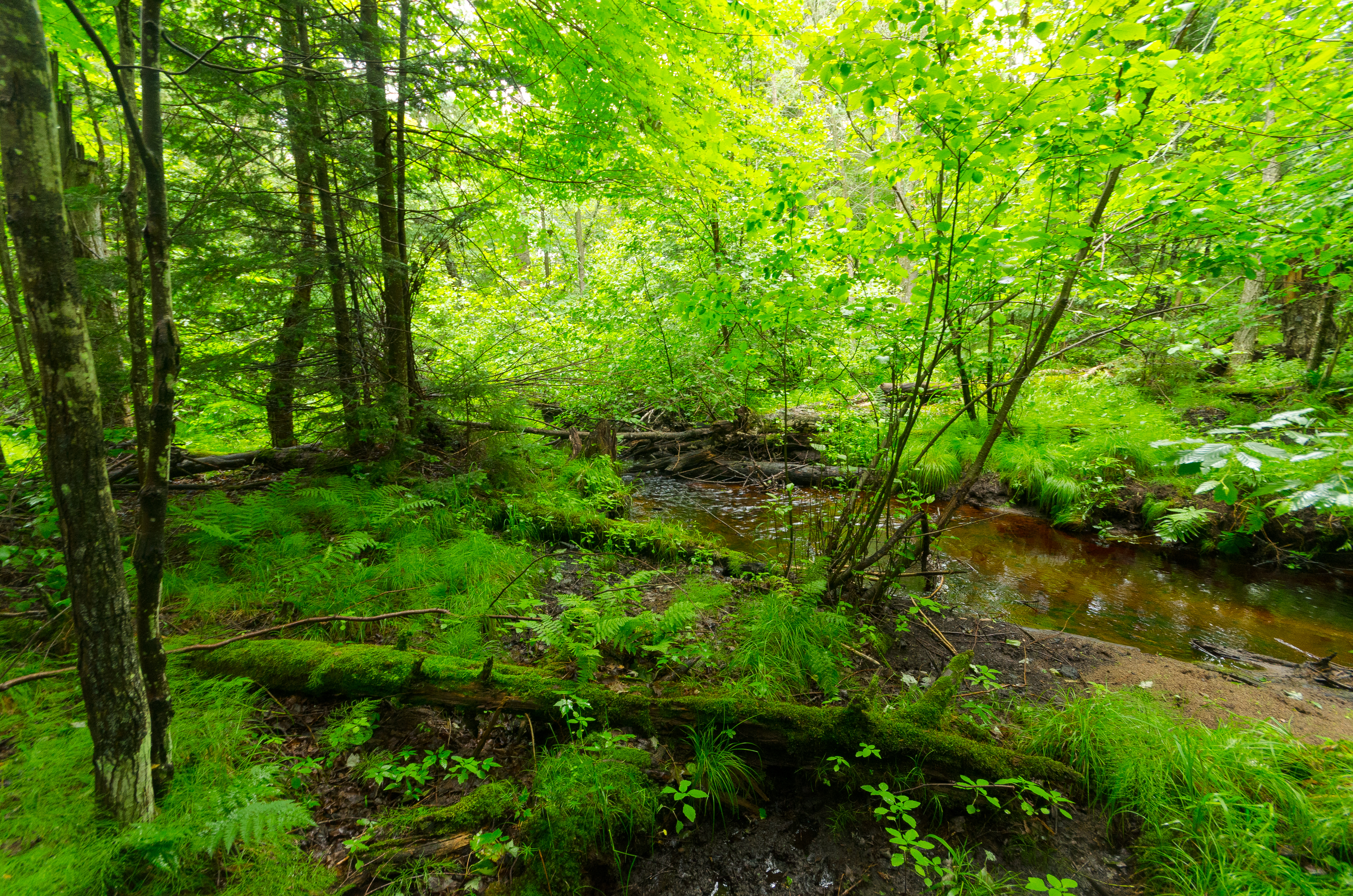
Lake of the Pines Conifer-Hardwoods

- Lake of the Pines Conifer-Hardwoods: Northern mesic forest on the peninsula on the east side of Lake of the Pines. It was old-growth until the 1977 windstorm toppled most of the trees. Now a band of old timber remains, and the damaged section is being monitored to understand natural regeneration of old-growth forests.
- North Fork Pines: A dry-mesic to mesic forest dominated by 15-30-inch white pine with yellow birch, sugar maple and paper birch. North of the north fork, near Rock Creek Road.
- Oxbo Pines: a stand of natural dry mesic forest on hilly slopes, dominated by 24-30 inch white and red pines. Northeast of Oxbo off Harz Road.

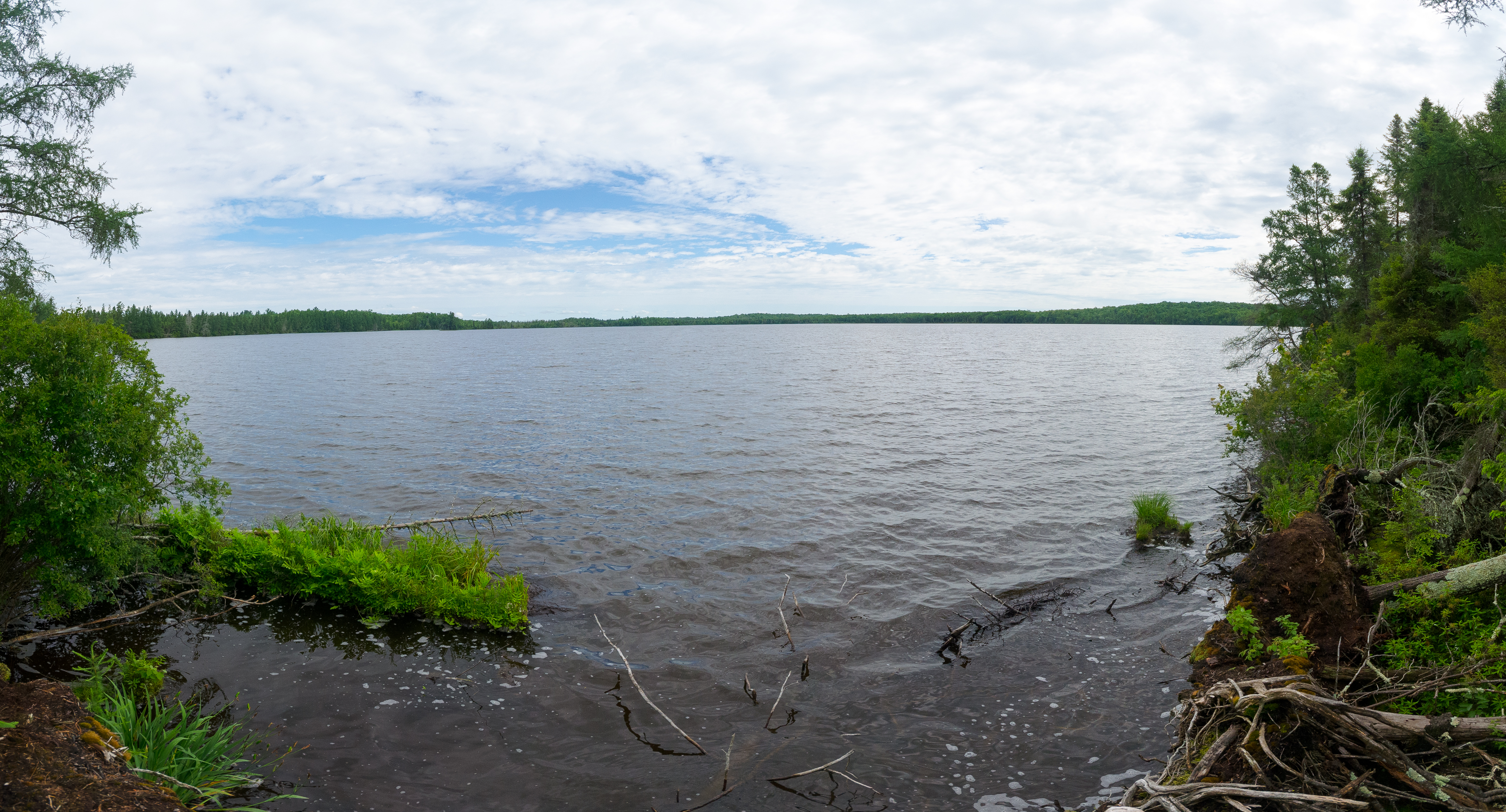
Swamp Lake

- Swamp Lake: Wilderness lake surrounded by black spruce and black ash swamps. Off Tower Hill Road and Bass Lake Road.
