= Wanigan =

Floating shack used during log drives

A wanigan or wannigan was a floating cook shack used during log drives in the Upper Midwest. Occasionally, a wanigan also served as a bunk house.

== History ==
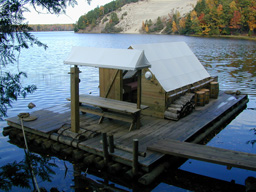
Wanigan at the Lumberman's Monument Visitor Center in Michigan.

A wanigan was a floating cook shack used by river drivers when moving logs down river to be milled. The word may be derived from the Ojibwe word "waanikaan", meaning an excavated hole or pit.

After spending the winter cutting pine, the logs would then be floated down the river in the spring, taking advantage of high water from snow melt. The wanigan was the headquarters for the log drive and provided food to the log drivers guiding the logs down the river. It also served as the camp store and post office. The clerk, who kept track of the men's work and purchases from the camp store, worked in the wanigan.

== Other meanings ==
A wanigan can also refer to a wooden box used to store kitchen supplies on a canoe trip, or a portable shelter on wheels or track.

== Legacy ==
Wannigan Days in St. Croix Falls, Wisconsin and Taylors Falls, Minnesota is named after the wanigan.

A replica wanigan is available to visit at the Forest History Center in Grand Rapids, Minnesota.
