= Turtle-Flambeau Flowage =

Lake In Wisconsin, U.S.

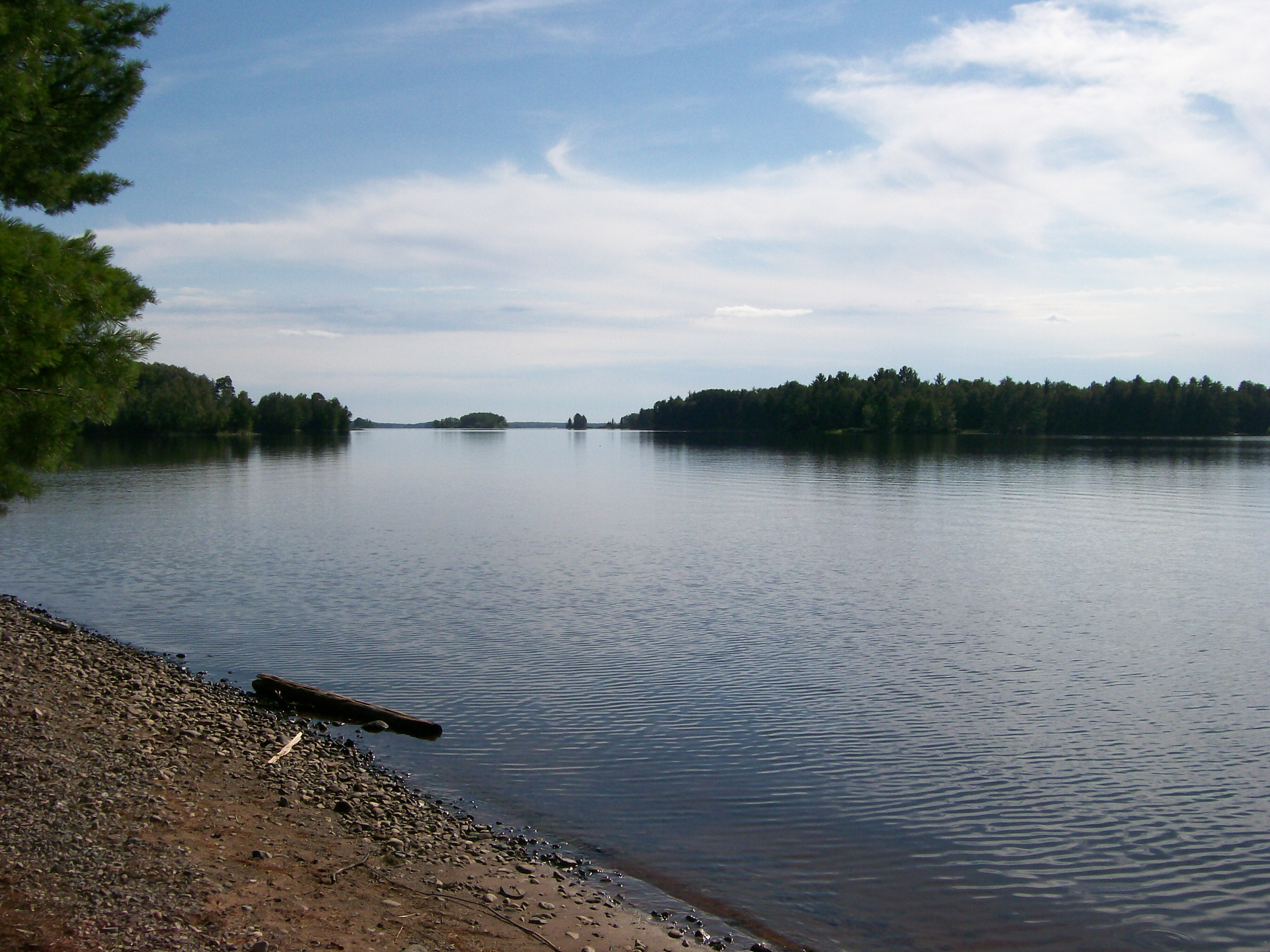
- View of the Turtle-Flambeau Flowage, looking southeast from Fisherman's Landing

- Location within Wisconsin Location within the United States

- Location: Iron County, Wisconsin, United States
- Coordinates: 46°5′N 90°13′W
- Type: Drainage
- Primary inflows: Flambeau River, Turtle River
- Primary outflows: Flambeau River
- Catchment area: 639.727 km^{2} (247.000 sq mi)
- Basin countries: United States
- Max. length: 15.4 km (9.6 mi)
- Max. width: 15.3 km (9.5 mi)
- Surface area: 52.37 km^{2} (20.22 sq mi)
- Max. depth: 15 m (49 ft)
- Shore length^{1}: 368.54 km (229.00 mi)
- Surface elevation: 519.4 m (1,704 ft)
- Frozen: Ice melts in late April – early May
- Islands: Big Island, plus many others
- Settlements: Mercer, Butternut
- ^{1} Shore length is not a well-defined measure.

The Turtle-Flambeau Flowage is a 12,942 acres (52.37 km^{2}) lake in Iron County, Wisconsin. It has a maximum depth of 15 meters and is the seventh largest lake in the state of Wisconsin by surface area. The flowage is home to unique wetland patterns and plant species as well as several species of sport and game fish, including musky, panfish, largemouth bass, smallmouth bass, northern pike, walleye and sturgeon. The lake's water clarity is low, but can vary in different locations. Fishing, camping, boating, and hunting are popular activities on the flowage, and Ojibwe people traditionally harvest fish and game on the lake. Environmental concerns on the flowage include mercury contamination, algal blooms, and several types of invasive species.

== Origins and history ==
The region which became the Turtle-Flambeau Flowage was originally a mix of forest, glades, kettle lakes, and rivers. The area was originally part of the drainage system for the Flambeau River.

The Turtle-Flambeau Flowage was created in 1926 when the Chippewa and Flambeau Improvement Company built a dam on the Flambeau River downstream from its confluence with the Turtle River. The dam flooded 16 natural lakes and formed an impoundment of approximately 14,000 acres (57 km^{2}).

The flowage was constructed as a reservoir to augment river flows and sustain hydroelectric plants operated downstream by electric utilities and paper mills. The dam also provided flood protection and created a unique recreational resource.

== Characteristics ==
=== Geography ===
The flowage's watershed covers nearly 640 square kilometers in Iron and Vilas Counties. 47% of the basin is forested, with another 33% covered by wetlands (including the Turtle-Flambeau Patterned Bog State Natural Area) and 19% covered by open water. Human land use is relatively sparse; agriculture, urban, and suburban areas combined make up less than 1% of the land use in the watershed.

=== Geology ===
The Turtle-Flambeau Flowage, like much of Iron County lies on top of a large granite formation from the Archean eon. Soils are generally sandy, due to the presence of post-glaciation old growth coniferous forests. The majority of exposed rock formations in the area were either gouged, carved, or deposited by receding glaciers. The flowage's basin is made up of approximately 45% sand, 30% gravel, 15% muck, and 10% rock.

=== Hydrology ===
The Turtle-Flambeau Flowage is a drainage lake (a lake where the majority of discharge is to outgoing rivers). It is fed by several rivers including the Flambeau River and Turtle River. The flowage discharges at the Turtle Dam into the Flambeau River. Discharge from the dam is monitored by Xcel Energy, which operates several power stations on the Flambeau River downstream of the flowage. The dam's average discharge is 20 cubic meters per second; however, it varies greatly based on lake water levels and the energy company's hydroelectric needs.

While the flowage's irregular nature makes it difficult to determine an average depth or volume, these determinations can be made for some of the old lake basins flooded by the dam. Former lakes that were inundated during the flowage's formation include:

Former lakes of the Turtle-Flambeau Flowage
Former lake^{a}	Former surface area (km^{2}) (approx.)^{b}	Basin volume (m^{3}) (approx.)^{b}
Blair Lake	0.7455	2,272,000
Sweeney Lake	0.2455	1,122,000
Mud Lake	0.2273	692,700
Merkle Lake	1.559	3,198,000
Turtle Lake	1.455	3,547,000
Rat Lake	0.4091	845,100
Lake Ten	1.327	4,046,000
Bastian Lake	2.045	5,812,000
Baraboo Lake	1.595	5,757,000
Townline Lake	1.309	3,000,000
Horseshoe Lake	2.741	4,177,000
Total	13.658	34,468,800
a: Landing Lake basin was also inundated but volume could not be calculated b: Area and volume calculated from bathymetry using weight of excised depth intervals.

The inundation of these lakes gives the flowage its irregular shape, with a shoreline development index of 12.91. Roughly 35% of the reservoir's surface area is made up of former lake basins; the rest is made up of shallow riverine and transition zones.

=== Water quality ===
Water quality varies among the flowage's several basins (former lake beds), with Baraboo having the best overall water quality and Townline the worst. While some basins (including Townline) resemble eutrophic lakes, others such as Baraboo are more accurately defined as mesotrophic. The reservoir is a productive and healthy lake with a water visibility going down approx. 1.5 m (5 feet) in the summer. The flowage is a holomictic lake which develops a single thermocline of productive with productive water above and depleted water below.

Comparison of Secchi depth, chlorophyll a, total phosphorus, temperature, and dissolved oxygen in Baraboo and Townline basins of the Turtle-Flambeau Flowage

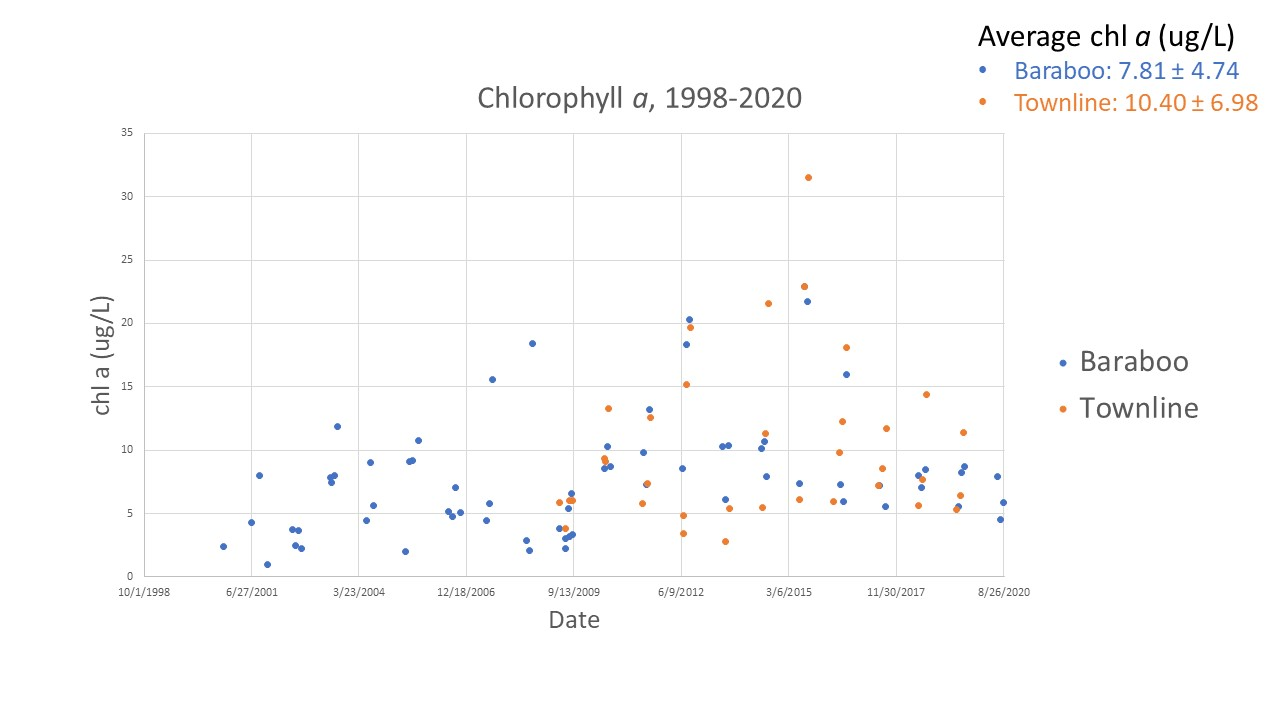
Comparison of chlorophyll a levels in Baraboo and Townline basins of the Turtle-Flambeau Flowage

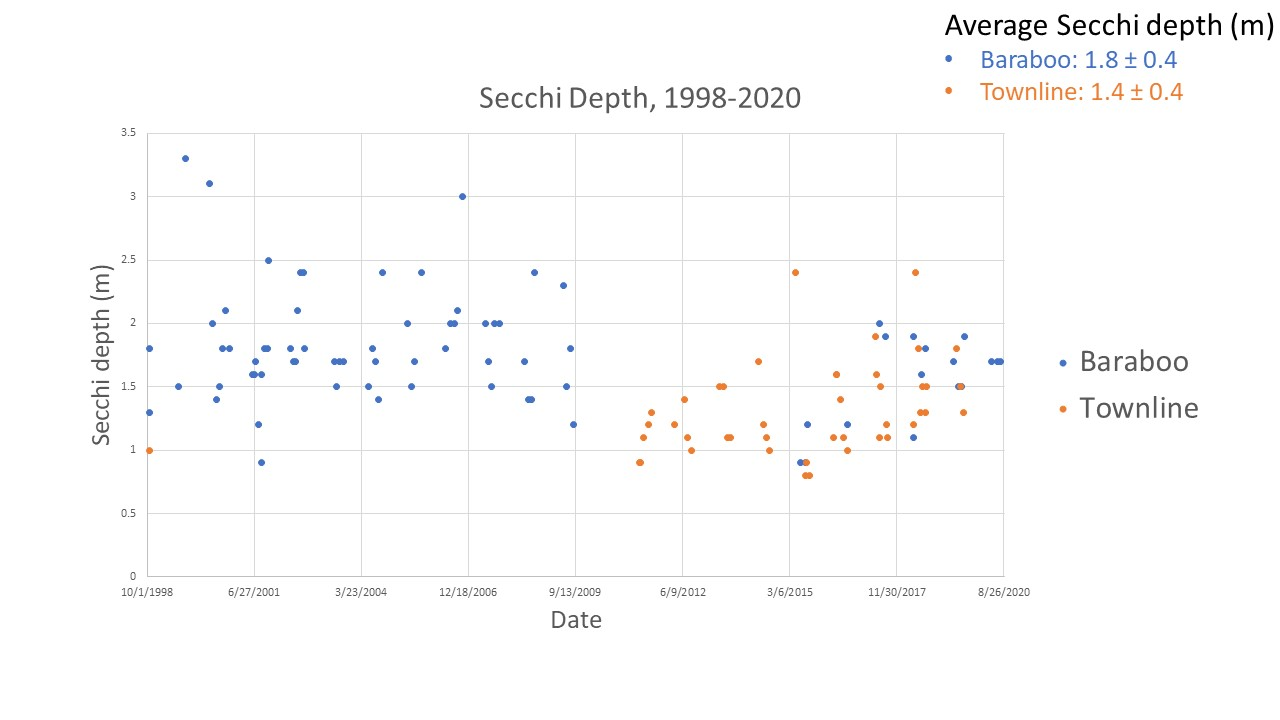
Comparison of Secchi depth in Baraboo and Townline basins of the Turtle-Flambeau Flowage

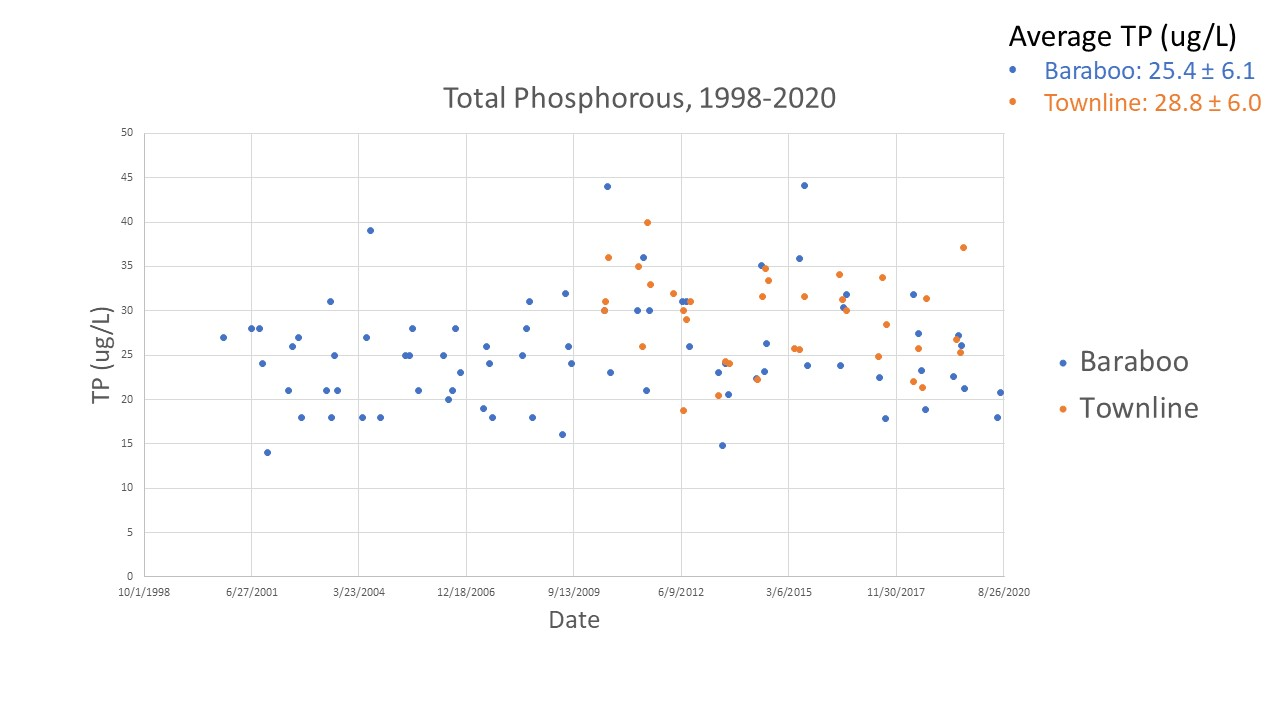
Comparison of total phosphorus levels in Baraboo and Townline basins of the Turtle-Flambeau Flowage

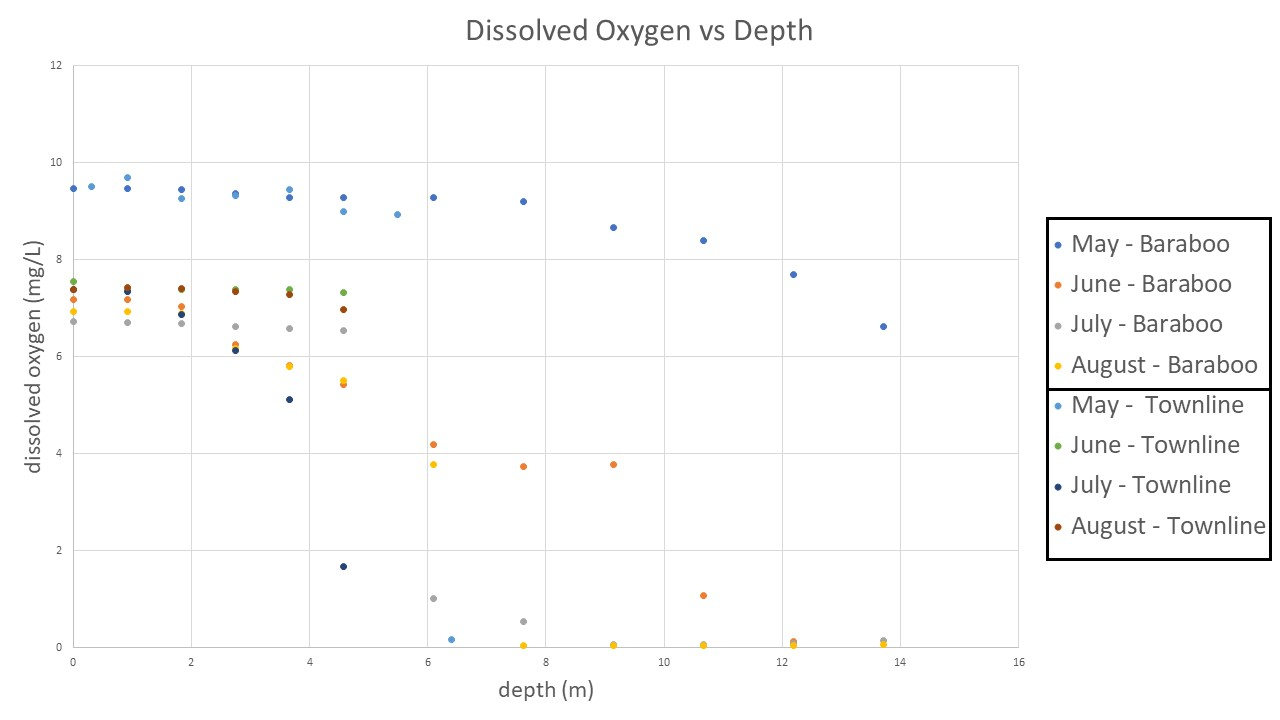
Comparison of dissolved oxygen vs depth measurements in Baraboo and Townline basins of the Turtle-Flambeau flowage

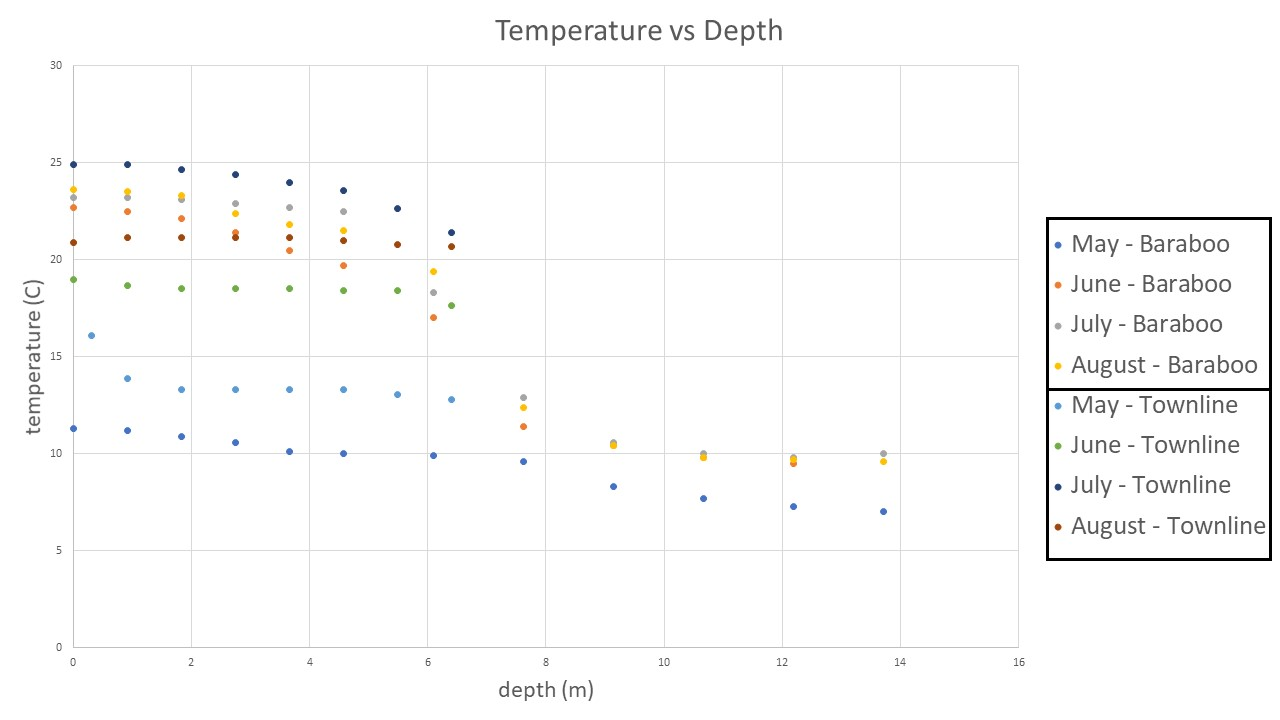
Comparison of temperature vs depth measurements in Baraboo and Townline basins of the Turtle-Flambeau flowage

== Wildlife ==
=== Flora ===
While trees surrounding a body of water may not live in the lake: they may still affect lake levels. Through the process of transpiration, tree roots pull water found in moist shoreline: lowering the amount of water available in lake. This rate of water collection is not even across all Wisconsin species. Trees endemic to wetlands such as the white cedar are more efficient at transporting water in their sap than upland trees such as the red pine or sugar maple.

The patterned bog in the southeast of the lake is a minerotrophic peatland with peat ridges separating water-filled hollows. This type of string bog is rare in Wisconsin. Rare plant species present in the bog include sparse-flowered sedge (C. tenuiflora), dragon's mouth orchid (A. bulbosa), and white bog orchid (P. dilatata).

=== Fauna ===
The lake is home to a wide variety of animals. Native fish include musky, panfish, largemouth bass, smallmouth bass, northern pike, walleye and sturgeon. Four water access points on the flowage also serve as fish stocking sites, with a fifth at the nearby Lake of the Falls impoundment. Reptiles include snapping turtles and painted turtles. The Turtle-Flambeau Flowage is also prime habitat for loons and features the largest concentration of eagle and osprey breeding pairs in Wisconsin. Mammal species found living in and around the flowage include river otter, beaver, black bear, and white-tailed deer. Deer grazing in the area is heavy enough to threaten the regeneration of the area's conifers.

== Environmental concerns ==
=== Mercury ===
Significant levels of methylmercury have been found in walleye tissue in both the Turtle-Flambeau Flowage and other reservoirs in Oneida, Sawyer, and Vilas counties. Walleye are harvested as a traditional food source for the Lake Superior Chippewa, and the bioaccumulation of mercury in these fish increases the risk of harmful exposure to humans. Wetlands are a major source of methylmercury in boreal forest environments, and the variable discharge from flowage dams can increase methylmercury exposures in reservoirs. The Turtle-Flambeau Flowage was declared impaired due to mercury contamination by the Wisconsin Department of Natural Resources in 2002, and a fish consumption warning has been in effect since 2009.

=== Algae ===
Additional impairments include high levels of phosphorus and chlorophyll a, indicators of elevated algal growth. The Mercer wastewater treatment plant, which discharges into the Little Turtle River, may provide some of the phosphorus input; nearby Mercer Lake suffers from algal blooms during periods of high discharge from the plant. However, tannin-stained runoff from surrounding wetlands decreases light penetration in the flowage, reducing the potential impact of harmful algal blooms in comparison to other area lakes.

=== Invasive species ===
==== Faucet snail ====
The faucet snail (Bithynia tentaculata) is an invasive aquatic snail from Europe. It outcompetes local species of snail throughout the Great Lakes region. This snail has been observed in Spider Lake, a tributary of the Turtle-Flambeau Flowage.

==== Purple loosestrife ====
Purple loosestrife, native to Asia, Europe, northwest Africa, and southeastern Australia, is an invasive species in Wisconsin. It has been observed in 445 lakes and rivers in Wisconsin, including the Turtle-Flambeau Flowage. The Turtle-Flambeau Flowage & Trude Lake Property Owners Association monitors purple loosestrife around the flowage. They conduct annual surveys and maintain a map displaying locations where the plant has been spotted.

==== Spiny waterflea ====
The spiny waterflea (Bythotrephes longimanus) is a prodigious arthropod predator that is a concern in much of the Great Lakes region. The spiny waterflea eats many native zooplankton, competing with native fish larvae; however, due to their large spined tails they are less often consumed by larger fish. Although it has not been identified in the Turtle-Flambeau Flowage, the waterflea has been observed in nearby lakes such as Butternut Lake (Forest County) and the Gile Flowage (Iron County). This species could be unintentionally spread to the Turtle-Flambeau Flowage by way of contaminated hulls or bilge tanks from boats, or on contaminated fishing line.

=== Monitoring ===
Some lake management activities are undertaken by the Turtle-Flambeau Flowage & Trude Lake Property Owners Association, Inc.; in 2010, this group sponsored a grant to assess flowage water quality. Additionally, the Iron County Land and Water Conservation Department monitors, reports, and takes action against invasive species. At the flowage, the department has performed biological control of purple loosestrife with Galerucella calmariensis beetles and conducted surveys of boating practices at landings.

== Cultural significance ==
=== Indigenous history ===
The lakes that would make up the Turtle-Flambeau Flowage all originally fell with in the territory of the Ojibwe. The band now living in Lac du Flambeau settled the area in 1745 under the leadership of Azhedewish (Bad Pelican).

It is most likely the first Europeans in the region were French fur traders and trappers otherwise known as Coureur de Bois.

In the Treaty of 1854 the Ojibwe officially ceded several territories in modern day Minnesota and Wisconsin including Iron County. The Wisconsin State Constitution holds that all navigable waters in the state are considered public highways. In this case the Flambeau River (and any land it floods) remain a matter of public trust. Businesses and property owners such as the Chippewa and Flambeau Improvement Company: the company responsible for the damming of the Turtle-Flambeau Flowage, do retain riparian rights.

While the Turtle-Flambeau flowage post-dates the ceding of Ojibwe lands to the state of Wisconsin, it and the surrounding waterways have been the source of many treaty disputes. While the 1854 treaty allowed the Ojibwe to hunt and fish on ceded territory, the state of Wisconsin attempted to regulate these activities both on and off reservations. In 1983, the U.S 7th Circuit Court of Appeals affirmed the tribes' right to fish and hunt in all ceded territories, not just reservations, in the Lac Court Oreilles v. Voigt, et al. case. This led to a backlash from white residents; rocks were thrown at Ojibwe spearfishers on the flowage, and groups such as Stop Treaty Abuse-Wisconsin confronted Ojibwe at boat landings across the area. Additionally, then-governor Tommy Thompson attempted to roll back the Ojibwe treaty rights, first through the court system and then by offering payments to different bands to suspend their harvest. Rep. Jim Sensenbrenner also introduced (unsuccessful) legislation in the U.S. House of representatives to ban tribal hunting and fishing on non-reservation lands. Tribal walleye spearfishing on the Turtle-Flambeau flowage accounts for 25% of the total harvest in ceded territory, and overall impact on the fishery is minimal (3.6% of total walleye harvest on the flowage).

=== Fishing ===
Many of the species of fish endemic to the Turtle-Flambeau Flowage are popular with anglers. Species including Walleye, Northern pike, and Muskellunge are popular trophy fish and therefore have an annual season to protect these species. Other fish commonly found on the flowage include smallmouth bass, rock bass, bluegill, black crappie, and bullhead catfish. The walleye population is especially robust, although estimated numbers declined from 72,967 fish ≥ 38 cm in 1989 to 54,208 fish ≥ 38 cm in 2009.

While most individuals are only allowed to use rod and reel for fishing, members of Ojibwe people have the right to spearfish walleye (see above) and 2025 reports estimate that over 38,000 walleye were speared or taken.

=== Tourism and recreation ===
The Turtle-Flambeau Flowage is a major destination of summer tourism. Visitors have access to the lake from four public boat landings. Camping, hunting, and fishing are also popular activities. The Turtle-Flambeau Scenic Waters Area offers 60 remote campsites accessible by water only. These sites are available year-round on a first-come, first-served basis. There is no camping fee, but camping on the flowage is restricted to designated sites.

Historically, many lakeside resorts have existed in the vicinity of the flowage. However, today much of the shoreline remains sparsely developed.

== See also ==
- List of lakes in Wisconsin
