= Turtle River (Wisconsin) =

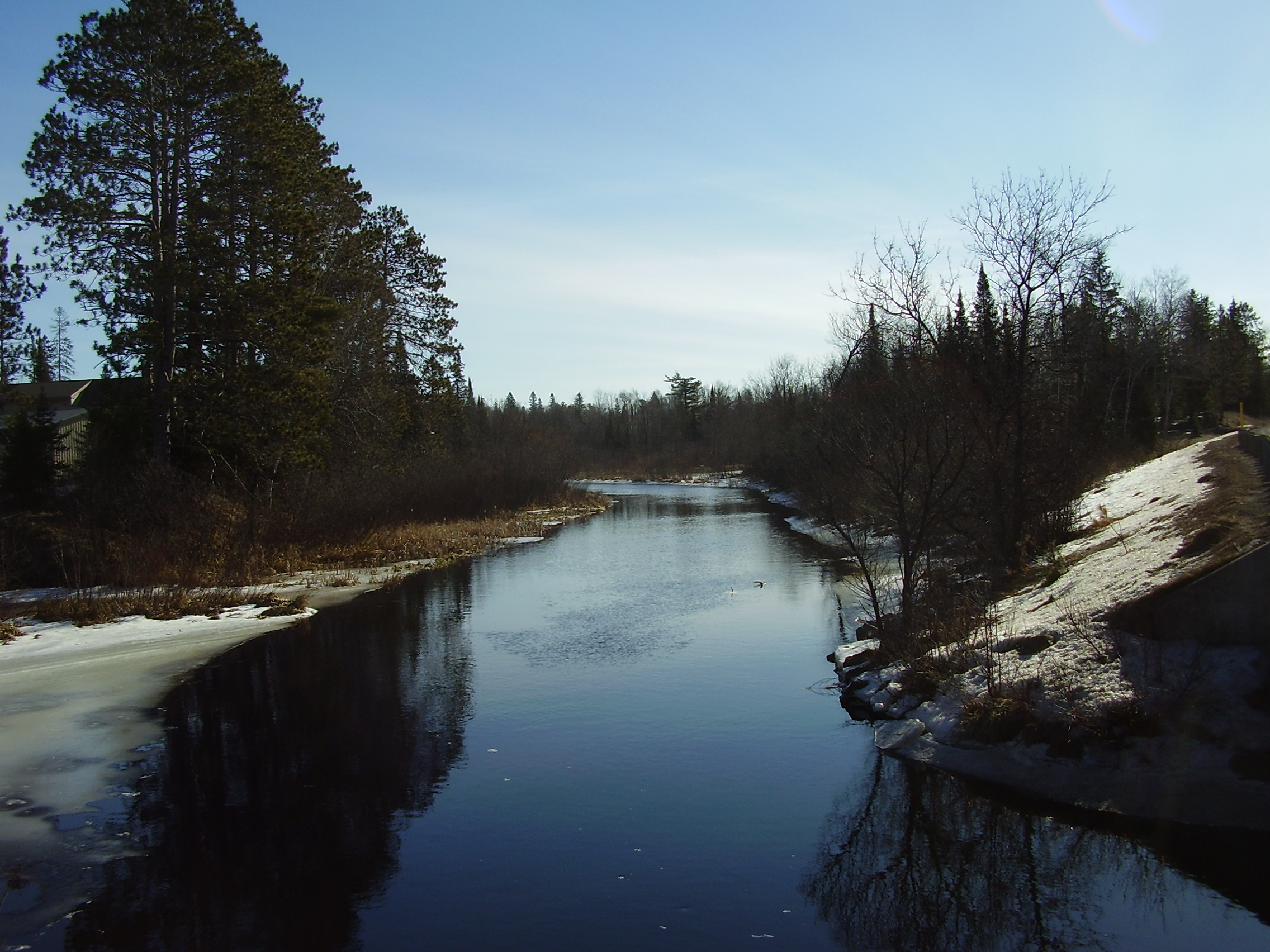
- Turtle River near the Highway 51 bridge.

Physical characteristics
- Source
  - coordinates: 46.2280045°N 89.8968275°W
- Mouth
  - coordinates: 46.1221705°N 90.1907234°W
  - elevation: 1,572 feet (479 m)

Basin features
- Tributaries
  - right: Little Turtle River, Long Lake Creek

The Turtle River is a river in Vilas County and Iron County in the state of Wisconsin in the United States. Its source is South Turtle Lake near Winchester. It flows into the Turtle-Flambeau Flowage.Little Turtle River Flowage is a 30 acre lake located in Iron County. It has a maximum depth of 4 feet.

Historically the Turtle River was an important part of an extensive network of canoe routes linked by short land portages, used by the Ojibwe and fur traders. In modern times the river and the lakes it connects are popular recreational waterways.
