= List of unincorporated communities in Eau Claire County, Wisconsin =

There are a number of unincorporated communities in Eau Claire County, Wisconsin. These fall into four basic types:

- Historical communities (no longer in existence) (†), some remain as ghost towns (‡)
- Former communities since annexed into larger municipalities (*)
- Modern-day small communities, too small to consider incorporation (§)
- Modern-day areas recognized as census-designated places by the United States Census Bureau (°)

Arranged here as they fall within present-day divisions of Eau Claire County, these are:

- City of Altoona
  none, although the original settlement was named East Eau Claire
- City of Augusta
  none
- Town of Bridge Creek
  - Hay Creek
  - Kempton
- Town of Brunswick
  - Candy Corners
  - Lufkin
  - Mount Hope Corners
  - Porter's Mills‡
- Town of Clear Creek
  - Allen§
  - Foster§
  - Nix Corner
  - Norseville
  - Otter Creek
- Town of Drammen
  - Anthony
  - Nelsonville‡
  - Oak Grove‡
- City of Eau Claire
  - Half Moon* (This was a town)
  - Magenta*
  - Pinehurst*
  - Putnam Heights*
  - Shawtown*
  - Truax*
  - Union*
  - West Eau Claire*
- Village of Fairchild
  none
- Town of Fairchild
  none
- Village of Fall Creek
  none
- Town of Lincoln
  - Rodell
  - Rosedale (Some sources claim this is an older name for Rodell, but maps such as this seem to indicate it was actually about 3 miles northwest of Rodell)
- Town of Ludington
  - Ludington§
- Town of Otter Creek
  - Hale Corner
- Town of Pleasant Valley
  - Cleghorn§
  - Hadleyville†
  - Shaw (Not to be confused with Shawtown, now within the city of Eau Claire)
- Town of Seymour
  - Seymour°
- Town of Union
  - Truax
  - Union
- Town of Washington
  - Brackett§
- Town of Wilson
  - Wilson§

== Maps ==
- LiveGen map from 1895 atlas]
- KinQuest map from 1901 atlas]
- Census info]

== See also ==
- List of unincorporated communities in Wisconsin
