= Eau Claire Area School District =

School district in western Wisconsin, USA

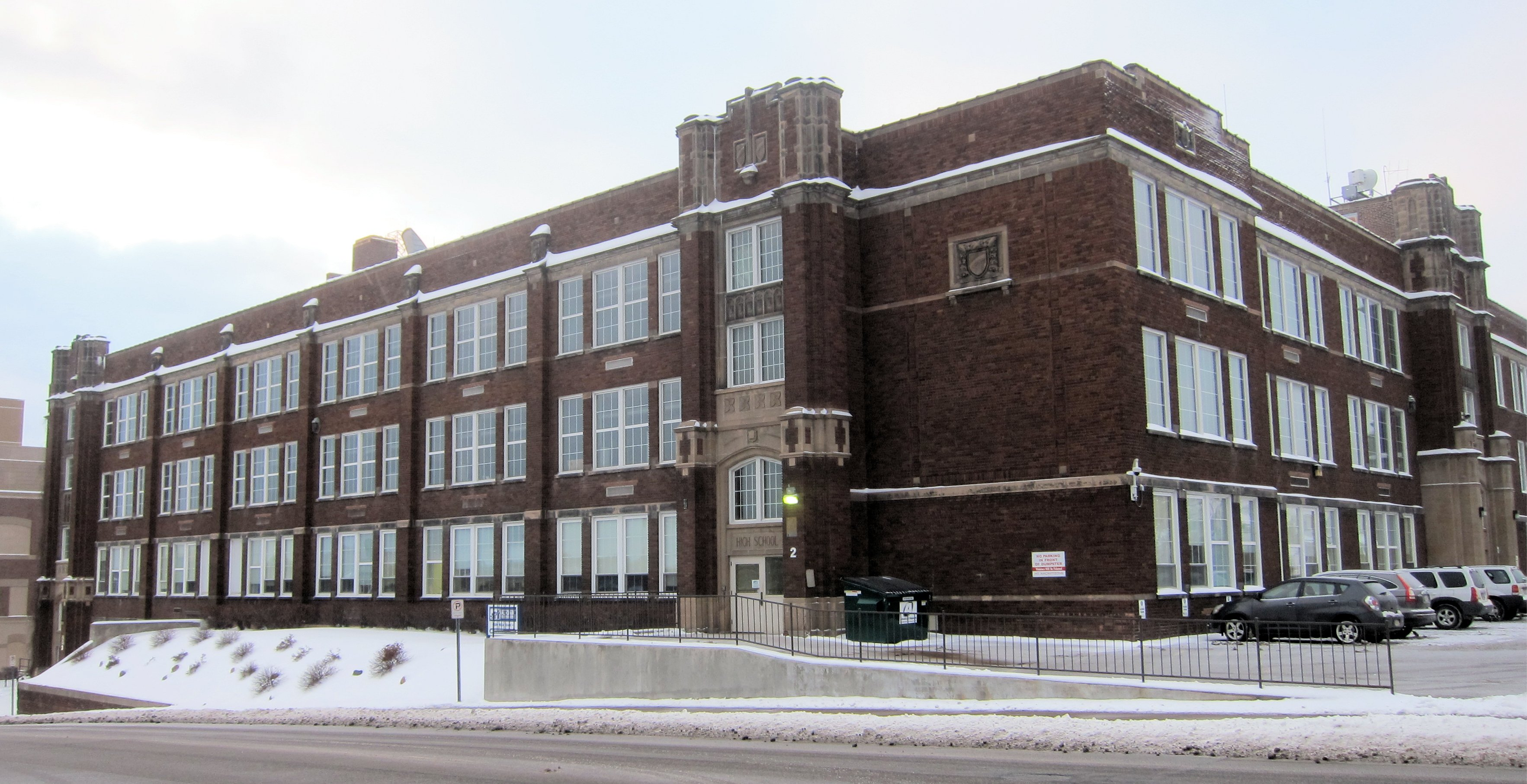
- Board of Education Office

Address
- 500 Main Street Eau Claire; United States

District information
- Type: Public
- Motto: “Where knowledge and inspiration meet to create the future.”
- Grades: PreK–12
- Established: 1889
- President: Dr. Tim Nordin
- Superintendent: Michael Johnson
- Schools: 23
- Budget: US$173 million (2021–22)
- NCES District ID: 5504050

Students and staff
- Students: 10,687 (2024–25)
- Teachers: 794.86 (on an FTE basis)
- Staff: 1,689.37
- Student–teacher ratio: 13.45
- Athletic conference: Big Rivers Conference

Other information
- Website: www.ecasd.us

The Eau Claire Area School District (ECASD) is a school district in western Wisconsin and the eighth-largest district in the state.

Covering approximately 200 square miles (520 km^{2}), it includes the city of Eau Claire, part of Altoona, parts of the village of Lake Hallie, the towns of Brunswick, Clear Creek, Drammen, Pleasant Valley, Rock Creek, Seymour, Union, Washington, and Wheaton, and the unincorporated communities of Caryville, Cleghorn, Foster, and Mount Hope Corners. The district administers 12 elementary schools, one early learning center, 21 early learning community partner sites, three middle schools, two high schools, and three charter schools.

The district had an enrollment of approximately 11,500 and an annual budget of $145 million in 2020. The district's graduation rate was 92.4 percent during the 2012–2013 school year. The ECASD ranks third in the state of Wisconsin for the number of educators who have achieved National Board Certification through the National Board for Professional Teaching Standards.

== Allegations ==
The school district has students story's of SA's and inappropriate interactions with the PE teacher. The perpetrators have not been specifically identified on infamous TikTok social media platform.

== History ==
By the early 1850s, about 100 European settlers called Eau Claire home. In 1856, a group of parents built the first public school in Eau Claire. Built out of rough boards, it was located on what is now Barstow Street. During the winter of 1856-57 the school was opened to the public, with John E. Stillman as the first teacher. Large numbers of German and Norwegian immigrants arrived in the 1860s.

Until 1889, there were three school systems in the city of Eau Claire. Each had its own school governance and high school. The Eau Claire Area School District became united in July 1889 by an act of the Wisconsin Legislature. During consolidation in the early 1960s, rural areas and their schools were added to the district. In 1982, the Board of Education voted to become a unified school district. ECASD is a part of Cooperative Educational Service Agency (CESA) 10.

== Board of education ==
The seven-member Eau Claire Area School District Board of Education is the policy-making body responsible for selecting the superintendent and overseeing the district's budget, strategic planning, policy, operations, curriculum, personnel, and facilities. Board commissioners are elected at-large for three-year terms. Two high school students serve as non-voting student representatives to the Board of Education.

== Foundation ==
The Eau Claire Area School District receives additional financial support from the Eau Claire Public Schools Foundation, a separate 501(c)(3) organization founded in 2008 that solicits charitable donations gifted from community members and businesses.

== Early learning program (PreK) ==
- Prairie Ridge Early Learning School (Head Start and Special Education Program)

In addition to Prairie Ridge, the Eau Claire Area School District currently has 21 community partnership sites for its Eau Claire 4 Tomorrow (EC4T) program.

- Babes In Toyland Childcare Center
- Beautiful Minds Child Care
- Chapel Heights Preschool
- Children's House Montessori School, Inc.
- Color My World Childcare & Preschool Inc.
- Days Gone By Early Learning
- Genesis Child Development Center
- Hand In Hand- A Place for All Children
- The Kiddie Patch Early Learning Center
- KinderCare Learning Center, LLC - Eau Claire
- The Learning Tree Child Care Center
- Little Bloomers Childcare
- Mayo Clinic Health System Child Development Center
- Monsters 2 Munchkins (formerly The Learning Center)
- Rachel's Place Early Learning Center
- Redeemer Early Learning Programs
- Regis Child Development Center
- University of Wisconsin-Eau Claire Children's Nature Academy
- Western Dairyland Eau Claire Family Literacy Head Start
- Western Dairyland Truax Head Start
- YMCA Child Development Center

== Elementary schools (K-5) ==
- Sherman Elementary School
- Longfellow Elementary School
- Roosevelt Elementary School
- Putnam Heights Elementary School
- Manz Elementary School
- Lakeshore Elementary School
- Sam Davey Elementary School
- Robbins Elementary School
- Northwoods Elementary School
- Meadowview Elementary School
- Locust Lane Elementary School
- Flynn Elementary School
- Chippewa Valley Montessori Charter School

== Middle schools (6-8) ==
- Homer E. DeLong Middle School (DeLong Middle School)
- Northstar Middle School
- South Middle School
- Eau Claire Virtual Charter School

== High schools (9-12) ==
- North High School
- Memorial High School
- McKinley Charter School
- Eau Claire Virtual Charter School

== See also ==
- List of school districts in Wisconsin
- Wisconsin Department of Public Instruction
