= Wisconsin Highway 312 =

Highway in Wisconsin

State Trunk Highway 312
- North Crossing

Route information
- Maintained by WisDOT
- Length: 7.9 mi (12.7 km)
- Existed: 2005–present

Major junctions
- West end: I-94 in Eau Claire
- US 12 in Eau Claire
- East end: US 53 in Eau Claire

Location
- Country: United States
- State: Wisconsin
- Counties: Eau Claire

Highway system
- Wisconsin State Trunk Highway System; Interstate; US; State; Scenic; Rustic
← WIS 311	→ WIS 318

State Trunk Highway 312 (often called Highway 312, STH-312 or WIS 312) is a 7.9-mile (12.7 km) long Wisconsin state highway running along the north side of Eau Claire, from the Town of Union in the west to the Town of Seymour in the east. The entire length of WIS 312 is an expressway with a few grade crossings.

The highway is a major transit route, bypassing the north side of Eau Claire by connecting Interstate 94 (I-94) with U.S. Highway 53 (US 53). The route number is derived as a spur route of US 12. WIS 312 is called the North Crossing in the Chippewa Valley.

== Route description ==
WIS 312 begins at an interchange with I-94 (exit 59) in the town of Union. It heads east for about 0.4 miles (0.64 km) to an intersection with US 12. East of this junction, US 12 and WIS 312 overlap for 2.6 miles (4.2 km) past the Wild Ridge and Mill Run golf courses to the northwestern limits of the city of Eau Claire. The two routes split at a diamond interchange; US 12 heads south on North Clairemont Avenue, and WIS 312 continues east as the North Crossing. WIS 312 travels another 2.4 miles (3.9 km) through the northern edge of Eau Claire, crossing over the Union Pacific, Altoona subdivision railroad tracks, before reaching the bridge over the Chippewa River. After crossing the river, WIS 312 passes under the Union Pacific, Chippewa Falls subdivision railroad tracks and comes to an interchange with North Hastings Way, a former alignment of US 53. About 1.3 miles (2.1 km) east of the North Hastings Way junction, WIS 312 comes to an end at an interchange with US 53 at exit 90 just outside Eau Claire in the town of Seymour.

== History ==
The North Crossing highway, serving as an alternative to I-94 bypassing downtown Eau Claire, was opened to traffic in 1994. The project was identified in 1983 when then State Rep. Mark Lewis (D Eau Claire) placed it as State Highway 124 on the official WI highway map in an amendment to the WI State Budget. In 1985 Lewis amended the Budget to provide the funds to identify, secure, and design the project. The City of Eau Claire donated land to the State and Northern States Power Company rerouted a transmission line to allow for the route. The name "North Crossing" developed during the planning stages of the project that culminated in the creation of the highway—the highway was designed to divert traffic crossing the Chippewa River that, before its creation, had to pass either through downtown Eau Claire, via the Madison St. bridge, or just west of Chippewa Falls on US 53. The distance between these two bridges is approximately eight miles (13 km). The North Crossing name specifically referred to a more northerly river crossing than any other point in Eau Claire. When it came time to decide upon a name for the highway, the term North Crossing had already become well established in the vocabulary of the area, and so it was decided that that was the most natural name for the new roadway. The Wisconsin Department of Transportation (WisDOT) extended WIS 124 from Chippewa Falls using an overlap with North Hastings Way (then US 53) to the North Crossing highway and then west along the highway to I-94.

In June 2005, the northern half of the Eau Claire Bypass (current US 53 freeway) was completed and signed as Bypass US 53. The North Crossing highway was extended about a mile east of North Hastings Way to meet the new freeway. This extension was also designated as part of Bypass US 53. WIS 312 was first established by legislation in 2005 as a new route number for the stretch of then WIS 124 running from I-94 to US 53. This resulted in the shortening of WIS 124 to a length and routing nearly identical to that it had in 1992 before it was extended to cover the then-new North Crossing in Eau Claire. While the legislation establishing WIS 312 was intended to only take effect once the new US 53 bypass of Eau Claire was completed, local authorities jumped the gun, posting new WIS 312 signs as early as November 2005. The southern half of the bypass opened in August 2006 and the US 53 designation was relocated from North Hastings Way to the new freeway. This resulted in the retiring of the Bypass US 53 designation. North Hastings Way was also turned back to local control.

== Junction list ==
The entire route is in Eau Claire County.

Location	mi	km	Destinations	Notes
Union	0.0	0.0	I-94 – Madison, St. Paul CTH-EE west	Exit 59 on I-94; roadway continues as CTH-EE
Eau Claire	0.4	0.64	US 12 west – Elk Mound	Western end of US 12 concurrency
Eau Claire	3.0	4.8	US 12 east / CTH-T north (Clairemont Avenue)	Eastern end of US 12 concurrency; interchange
Eau Claire	5.4	8.7	Chippewa River crossing	
Eau Claire	6.6	10.6	Bus. US 53 (North Hastings Way)	Former alignment of US 53; interchange
Seymour	7.9	12.7	US 53 to WIS 29 / CTH-Q east (Olson Drive)	Exit 90 on US 53
1.000 mi = 1.609 km; 1.000 km = 0.621 mi: Concurrency terminus
