= William A. Cernahan =

American politician

William Archibald "W.A." Cerhanan (January 30, 1866 – April 16, 1908) was an American politician and farmer.

Born in the town of Union, Eau Claire County, Wisconsin, Cernahan went to public school. He was a farmer. Cernanhan served in various town and county offices. In 1907, Cernahan served in the Wisconsin State Assembly and was a Democrat. Cernahan died in Eau Claire, Wisconsin from tetanus, while still serving in the Wisconsin State Assembly.
