= Seymour (CDP), Eau Claire County, Wisconsin =

Census-designated place in Wisconsin, United States

Seymour, Wisconsin
- Census-designated place
- Location within the state of Wisconsin
- Coordinates: 44°49′37″N 91°26′26″W
- Country: United States
- State: Wisconsin
- County: Eau Claire

Area
  - Total: 2.961 sq mi (7.67 km^{2})
  - Land: 2.283 sq mi (5.91 km^{2})
  - Water: 0.678 sq mi (1.76 km^{2})

Population (2020)
  - Total: 1,501
  - Density: 657.5/sq mi (253.8/km^{2})
- Time zone: UTC-6 (Central (CST))
  - Summer (DST): UTC-5 (CDT)
- ZIP code: 54703
- Area codes: 715 & 534

Seymour is a census-designated place (CDP) in Eau Claire County, Wisconsin, United States. The population was 1,501 at the 2020 census, up from 1,418 at the 2010 census. It is located within the town of Seymour and is part of the Eau Claire urban area.

== Geography ==
Seymour is located at 44°49′37″N 91°26′25″W (44.82706, -91.440459).

According to the United States Census Bureau, the CDP has a total area of 7.7 km^{2} (3.0 sq mi), of which 5.9 km^{2} (2.3 sq mi) is land and 1.8 km^{2} (0.69 sq mi) (22.52%) is water.

== Demographics ==
Historical population
Census	Pop.	Note	%±
1990	1,557		—
2000	1,474		−5.3%
2010	1,418		−3.8%
2020	1,501		5.9%

As of the census of 2000, there were 1,474 people, 591 households, and 432 families residing in the CDP. The population density was 243.2 people/km^{2} (630 people/mi^{2}). There were 621 housing units at an average density of 102.5 units/km^{2} (265 units/mi^{2}). The racial makeup of the CDP was 97.29% White, 0.14% Black or African American, 0.88% Native American, 0.81% Asian, 0.20% from other races, and 0.68% from two or more races. Hispanic or Latino of any race were 0.68% of the population.

There were 591 households, out of which 29.8% had children under the age of 18 living with them, 63.3% were married couples living together, 5.4% had a female householder with no husband present, and 26.9% were non-families. 20.1% of all households were made up of individuals, and 7.6% had someone living alone who was 65 years of age or older. The average household size was 2.49 and the average family size was 2.88.

In the CDP, the population was spread out, with 22.3% under the age of 18, 6.4% from 18 to 24, 27.5% from 25 to 44, 30.4% from 45 to 64, and 13.4% who were 65 years of age or older. The median age was 42 years. For every 100 females, there were 110.0 males. For every 100 females age 18 and over, there were 106.5 males.

The median income for a household in the CDP was $45,427, and the median income for a family was $49,135. Males had a median income of $37,500 versus $37,740 for females. The per capita income for the CDP was $19,846. About 0.5% of families and 3.7% of the population were below the poverty line, including 4.2% of those under age 18 and none of those age 65 or over.
