= Porter's Mills, Wisconsin =

- Ghost town
- Location within Wisconsin
- Coordinates: 44°46′15″N 91°34′01″W
- Country: United States
- State: Wisconsin
- County: Eau Claire
- Elevation: 771 ft (235 m)
- GNIS feature ID: 1578437

Porter's Mills, also called Porterville, was a logging boomtown in Eau Claire County, Wisconsin, United States, between Brunswick and Eau Claire, at 44° 46' 15" N 91° 34' 01" W. at an elevation of 771 feet.

== History ==
The first sawmill at the site of Porter's Mills was built in 1863. The prime mill sites in Eau Claire had already been taken, so Charles Warner built this mill four miles below Eau Claire on the Chippewa River, near a natural slough which worked reasonably well for holding logs.

In 1864 Warner sold the mill to the firm of Porter, Brown & Meredith, who operated it for two years until it burned in 1866. After the fire, Gilbert E. Porter bought out the shares of his partners. He and his men rebuilt the mill in 30 days, with twice the capacity. Porter had grown up on a farm in Michigan, taught school there, worked for the Chapman and Thorp Lumber Company in Eau Claire, and managed the Eau Claire Free Press. In 1867 Delos R. Moon bought half the business. Porter and Moon's enterprise later became the Northwestern Lumber Company, after adding other partners.

The mill was chiefly fed pine logs which were cut upstream in the Chippewa valley and floated down in spring log drives. They were held floating in the mill's booms until they could be sawed. Early on, the mill used circle saws and gang saws. Later some of these were replaced by a band saw. There was also a shingle mill, a planing mill, trimmers, edgers, kilns, and drying sheds. In the early years, most of the output - lumber, shingles and lath - was floated down the Chippewa to Northwestern's lumberyard in Hannibal, Missouri. In 1883 the Chicago, Milwaukee & St Paul Railroad built a line through Porter's Mills, and began shipping products west by rail, to places like Minnesota and South Dakota.

By 1873 Porter's Mills provided thirty-two houses for married employees. Other employees owned their own homes in town. The town was dry like many company towns. Relations were generally good between company and employees. For example, when millworkers in Eau Claire went on strike for a ten-hour workday in 1881, the workers at Porter's Mills outside of town didn't join the strike. The town suffered various floods and fires, but people pulled together and the town grew.

In 1888, the mill produced 45,000,000 feet of lumber, 25,000,000 shingles, and 10,000,000 lath. At its peak around 1890, it employed almost 500 workers. The town had a public school, a post office, churches, a blacksmith, the company store, candy stores, a shoe shop, a hotel, a library association, and a population of over 1,100. Many of the residents were of Scandinavian origin and in 1890 a resident complained that the town hadn't seen an English-speaking preacher in three months.

Eventually the pine timber upriver ran out. Northwestern Lumber started to cut back its operations at Porter's Mills in 1891, moving the offices to Stanley, Wisconsin, where Northwestern Lumber had another mill. The last mill in Porter's Mills was dismantled in 1899, and the population moved on, to Stanley, Eau Claire or elsewhere. By 1904, the town had ceased to be.

== Notable person ==
William Lyman Smith, later to be a member of the Wisconsin State Assembly and Wisconsin State Senate, grew up and went to public school in Porter's Mills.
