= Brackett, Wisconsin =

- Unincorporated community
- Location within Wisconsin Location within the United States
- Coordinates: 44°42′05″N 91°21′04″W
- Country: United States
- State: Wisconsin
- County: Eau Claire
- Elevation: 948 ft (289 m)
- Time zone: UTC-6 (Central (CST))
  - Summer (DST): UTC-5 (CDT)
- Area codes: 715 & 534
- GNIS feature ID: 1562120

Brackett is an unincorporated community located on U.S. Route 53 in the town of Washington, Eau Claire County, Wisconsin, United States. It was named for James M. Brackett, a newspaper editor and publisher. He was involved with the Eau Claire Free Press in the 1870s.

== In popular culture ==
Indie/Alternative band Bon Iver has a song called "Brackett, WI", which was featured on the 2009 charity compilation album Dark Was The Night.
