= Wilson, Eau Claire County, Wisconsin =

Town of Wilson, Wisconsin
- Town
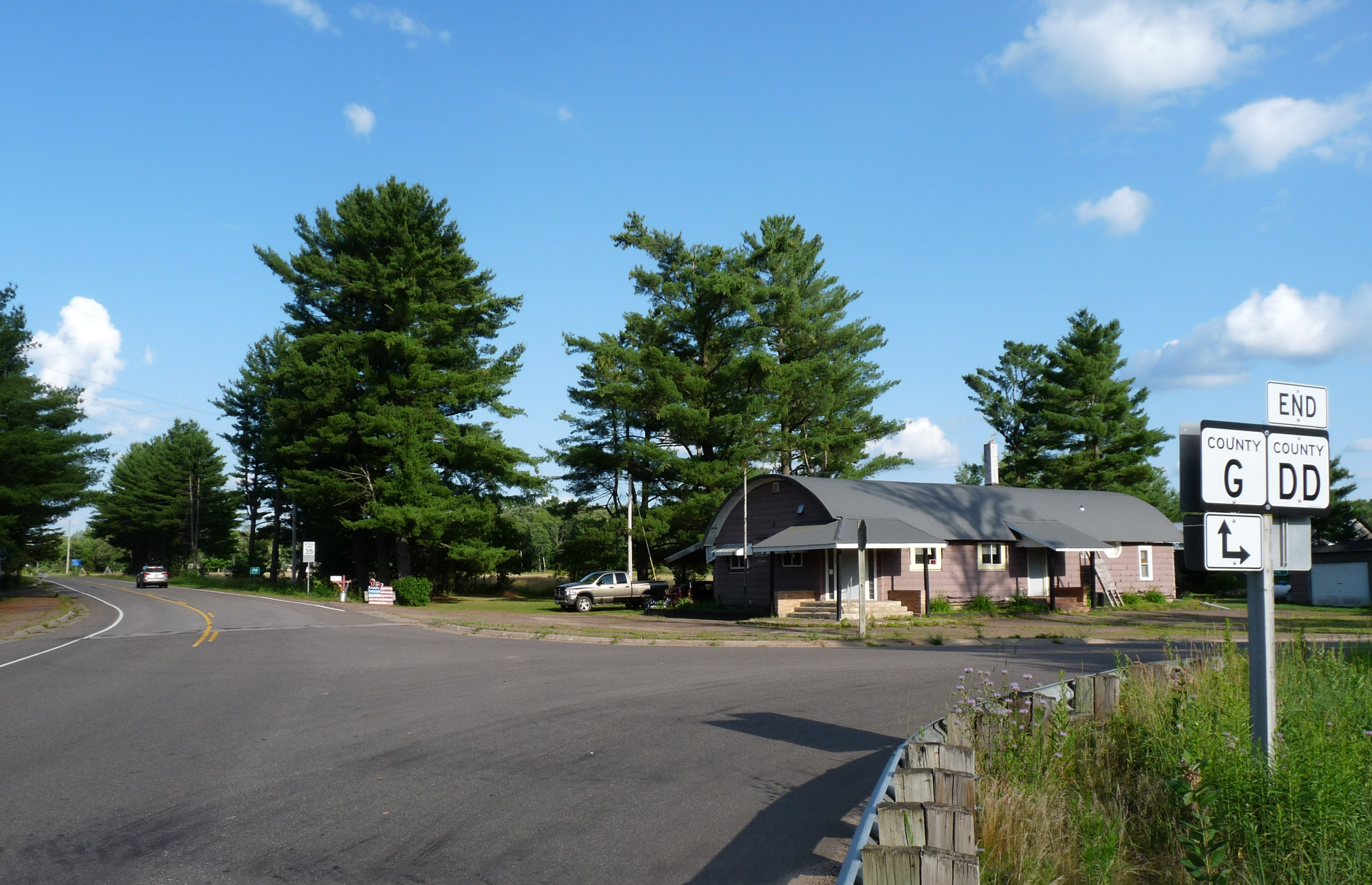
- Town hall at the junction of G and DD

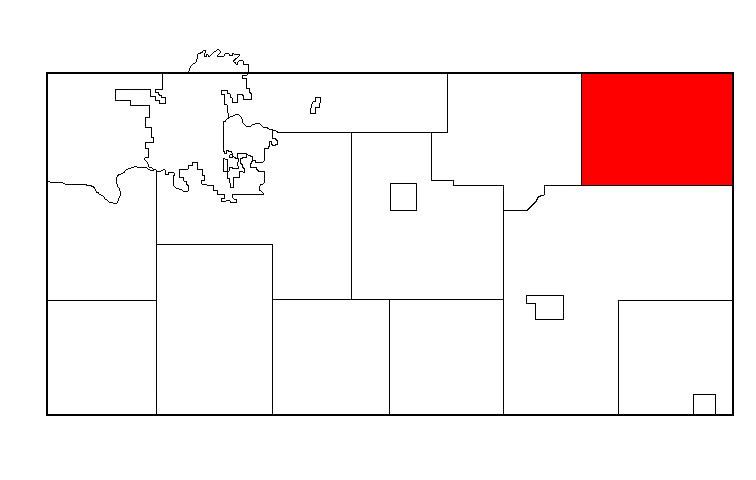
- Location of the Town of Wilson within Eau Claire County

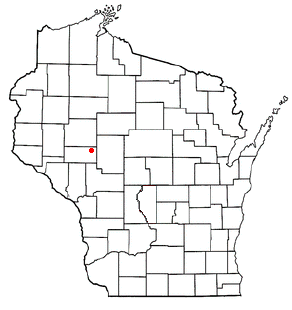
- Location of Wilson
- Coordinates: 44°50′13″N 91°0′23″W
- Country: United States
- State: Wisconsin
- County: Eau Claire

Area
  - Total: 47.7 sq mi (123.6 km^{2})
  - Land: 47.7 sq mi (123.5 km^{2})
  - Water: 0.039 sq mi (0.1 km^{2})
- Elevation: 1,040 ft (317 m)

Population (2020)
  - Total: 427
  - Density: 8.95/sq mi (3.46/km^{2})
- Time zone: UTC-6 (Central (CST))
  - Summer (DST): UTC-5 (CDT)
- Area codes: 715 & 534
- FIPS code: 55-87400
- GNIS feature ID: 1584444
- Website: https://www.townofwilsonwi.com/

Wilson is a town in Eau Claire County, Wisconsin, United States. The population was 427 at the 2020 census. The unincorporated community of Wilson is located in the town.

== Geography ==
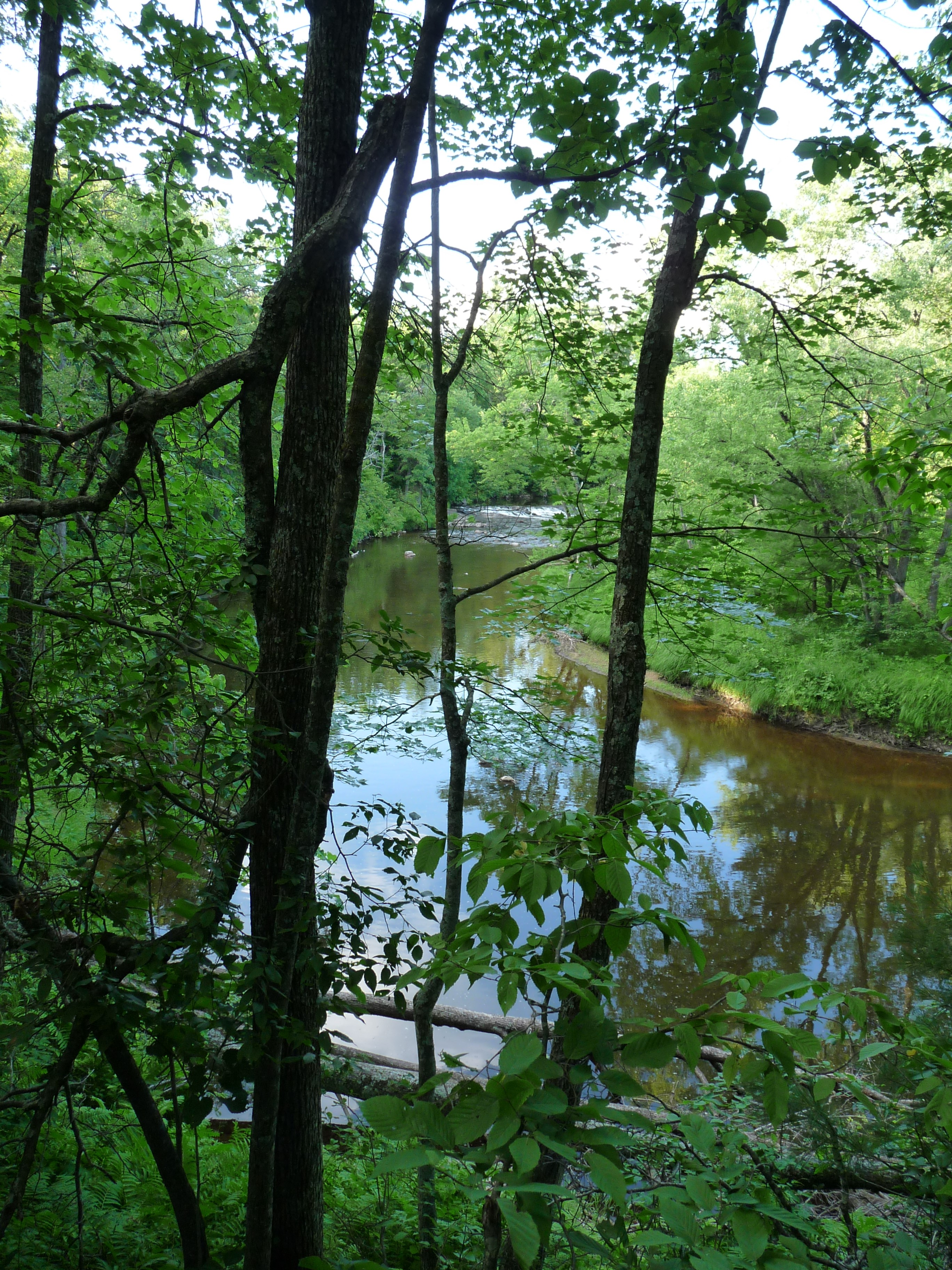
Hamilton Falls on the North Fork of the Eau Claire River in Wilson

According to the United States Census Bureau, the town has a total area of 47.7 square miles (123.6 km^{2}), of which 47.7 square miles (123.5 km^{2}) is land and 0.04 square mile (0.1 km^{2}) (0.08%) is water.

== Demographics ==
Historical population
Census	Pop.	Note	%±
1970	513		—
1980	516		0.6%
1990	477		−7.6%
2000	420		−11.9%
2010	485		15.5%
2020 (est.)	500		3.1%

As of the census of 2000, there were 420 people, 148 households, and 113 families residing in the town. The population density was 8.8 people per square mile (3.4/km^{2}). There were 185 housing units at an average density of 3.9 per square mile (1.5/km^{2}). The racial makeup of the town was 99.05% White, 0.24% Native American, 0.24% Asian, and 0.48% from two or more races. Hispanic or Latino of any race were 0.71% of the population.

There were 148 households, out of which 33.8% had children under the age of 18 living with them, 66.9% were married couples living together, 6.1% had a female householder with no husband present, and 23.6% were non-families. 19.6% of all households were made up of individuals, and 6.1% had someone living alone who was 65 years of age or older. The average household size was 2.84 and the average family size was 3.28.

The population was 28.6% under the age of 18, 9.0% from 18 to 24, 27.9% from 25 to 44, 22.1% from 45 to 64, and 12.4% who were 65 years of age or older. The median age was 35 years. For every 100 females, there were 122.2 males. For every 100 females age 18 and over, there were 123.9 males.

The median income for a household in the town was $36,563, and the median income for a family was $40,000. Males had a median income of $30,179 versus $21,786 for females. The per capita income for the town was $14,970. About 8.0% of families and 12.2% of the population were below the poverty line, including 13.8% of those under age 18 and 5.4% of those age 65 or over.
