= Hale Corner, Wisconsin =

- Unincorporated community
- Location within Wisconsin Location within the United States
- Coordinates: 44°39′42″N 91°16′36″W
- Country: United States
- State: Wisconsin
- County: Eau Claire
- Elevation: 1,037 ft (316 m)
- Time zone: UTC-6 (Central (CST))
  - Summer (DST): UTC-5 (CDT)
- Area codes: 715 & 534
- GNIS feature ID: 1577624

Hale Corner is an unincorporated community located in the town of Otter Creek, Eau Claire County, Wisconsin, United States. The community was named for its first known settler, Charles H. Hale, who came from Maine in 1856.
