= Candy Corners, Wisconsin =

- Unincorporated community
- Location within Wisconsin Location within the United States
- Coordinates: 44°42′45″N 91°36′00″W
- Country: United States
- State: Wisconsin
- County: Eau Claire
- Elevation: 902 ft (275 m)
- Time zone: UTC-6 (Central (CST))
  - Summer (DST): UTC-5 (CDT)
- Area codes: 715 & 534
- GNIS feature ID: 1562701

Candy Corners is an unincorporated community in Eau Claire County, Wisconsin, United States. Its name is taken from the Candy Corners store, which was established by Jothan Garnett circa 1888.
