= Lincoln, Eau Claire County, Wisconsin =

Lincoln, Wisconsin
- Town
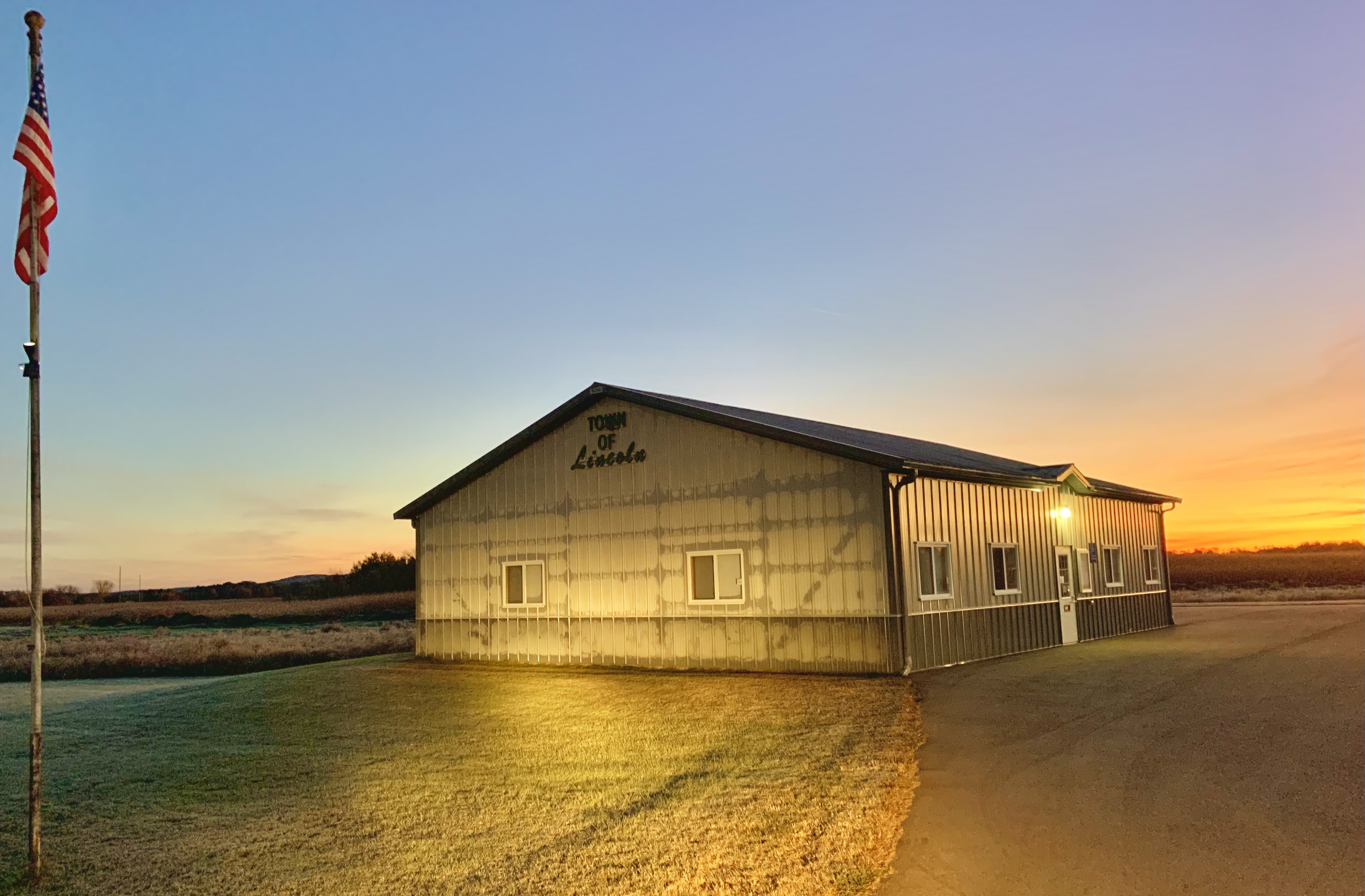
- Town hall

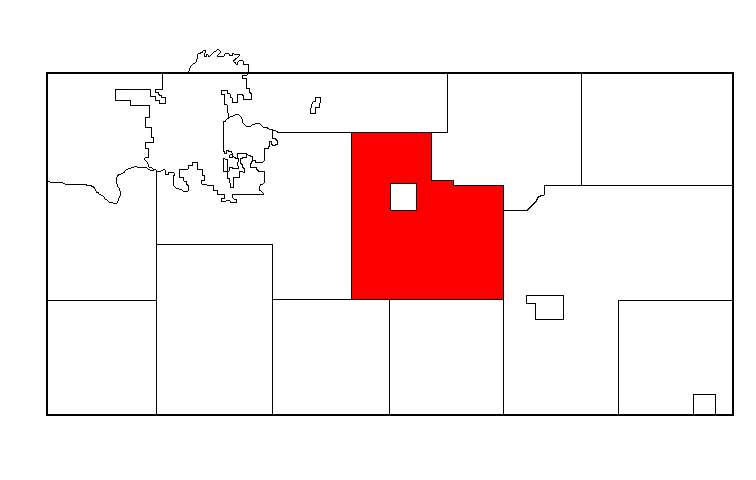
- Position of Lincoln in Eau Claire County

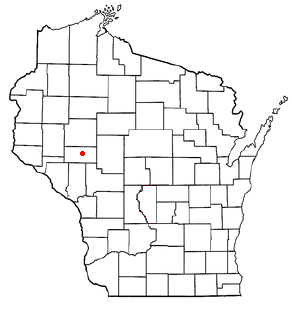
- Location of Lincoln, Wisconsin
- Coordinates: 44°45′2″N 91°14′18″W
- Country: United States
- State: Wisconsin
- County: Eau Claire

Area
  - Total: 58.7 sq mi (152.1 km^{2})
  - Land: 58.2 sq mi (150.8 km^{2})
  - Water: 0.50 sq mi (1.3 km^{2})
- Elevation: 955 ft (291 m)

Population (2020)
  - Total: 1,125
  - Density: 19.32/sq mi (7.460/km^{2})
- Time zone: UTC-6 (Central (CST))
  - Summer (DST): UTC-5 (CDT)
- Area codes: 715 & 534
- FIPS code: 55-44350
- GNIS feature ID: 1583564
- Website: https://lincolntownshipwi.com/

Lincoln is a town in Eau Claire County, Wisconsin, United States. The population was 1,125 at the 2020 census. The village of Fall Creek is located within and surrounded by the town. The unincorporated community of Rodell is also located in the town.

== Geography ==
According to the United States Census Bureau, the town has a total area of 58.7 square miles (152.1 km^{2}), of which 58.2 square miles (150.8 km^{2}) is land and 0.5 square mile (1.3 km^{2}) (0.83%) is water.

== Demographics ==
Historical population
Census	Pop.	Note	%±
1980	975		—
1990	1,002		2.8%
2000	1,080		7.8%
2010	1,096		1.5%
2020	1,125		2.6%

As of the census of 2000, there were 1,080 people, 364 households, and 293 families residing in the town. The population density was 18.5 people per square mile (7.2/km^{2}). There were 380 housing units at an average density of 6.5 per square mile (2.5/km^{2}). The racial makeup of the town was 98.61% White, 0.19% African American, 0.09% Native American, 0.28% Pacific Islander, 0.46% from other races, and 0.37% from two or more races. Hispanic or Latino of any race were 0.37% of the population.

There were 364 households, out of which 39.6% had children under the age of 18 living with them, 71.4% were married couples living together, 4.9% had a female householder with no husband present, and 19.5% were non-families. 17.9% of all households were made up of individuals, and 4.9% had someone living alone who was 65 years of age or older. The average household size was 2.97 and the average family size was 3.33.

The population was 31.7% under the age of 18, 6.0% from 18 to 24, 30.9% from 25 to 44, 24.1% from 45 to 64, and 7.3% who were 65 years of age or older. The median age was 34 years. For every 100 females, there were 104.9 males. For every 100 females age 18 and over, there were 108.5 males.

The median income for a household in the town was $48,542, and the median income for a family was $51,944. Males had a median income of $32,679 versus $22,500 for females. The per capita income for the town was $20,678. About 2.9% of families and 3.3% of the population were below the poverty line, including 3.3% of those under age 18 and 6.3% of those age 65 or over.
