= Hay Creek, Wisconsin =

- Unincorporated community
- Location within Wisconsin Location within the United States
- Coordinates: 44°37′20″N 91°04′30″W
- Country: United States
- State: Wisconsin
- County: Eau Claire
- Elevation: 1,050 ft (320 m)
- Time zone: UTC-6 (Central (CST))
  - Summer (DST): UTC-5 (CDT)
- Area codes: 715 & 534
- GNIS feature ID: 1566172

Hay Creek is an unincorporated community located in the town of Bridge Creek, Eau Claire County, Wisconsin, United States.
