= Bridge Creek, Wisconsin =

- Town
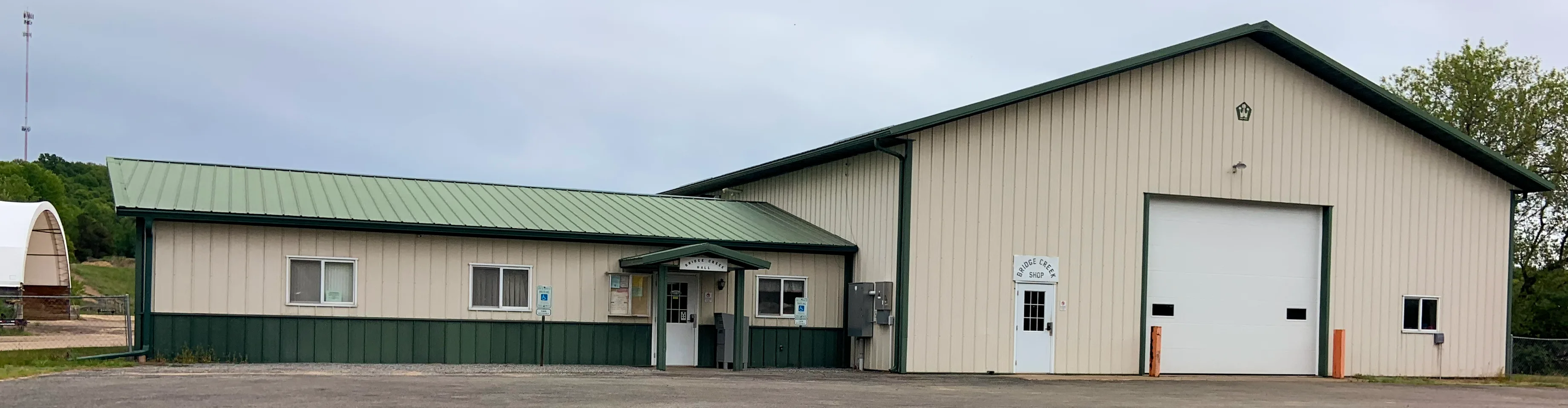
- Bridge Creek Town Hall

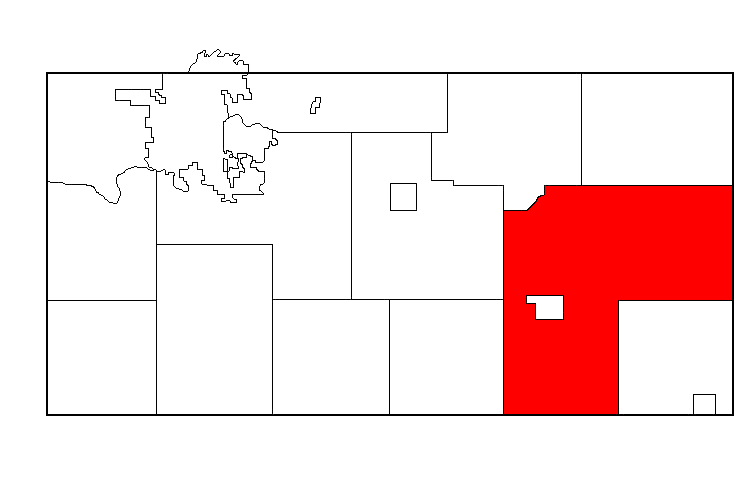
- Location of Bridge Creek within Eau Claire County

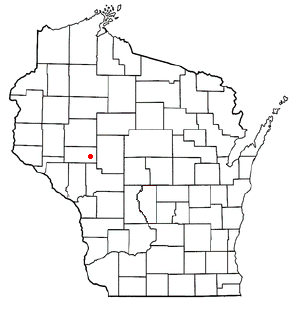
- Location of Bridge Creek, Wisconsin
- Coordinates: 44°41′11″N 91°4′0″W
- Country: United States
- State: Wisconsin
- County: Eau Claire

Area
  - Total: 104.3 sq mi (270.1 km^{2})
  - Land: 102.4 sq mi (265.3 km^{2})
  - Water: 1.9 sq mi (4.8 km^{2})
- Elevation: 1,001 ft (305 m)

Population (2020)
  - Total: 2,214
  - Density: 21.61/sq mi (8.345/km^{2})
- Time zone: UTC-6 (Central (CST))
  - Summer (DST): UTC-5 (CDT)
- Area codes: 715 & 534
- FIPS code: 55-09500
- GNIS feature ID: 1582855
- Website: https://bridgecreek.wi.gov/

Bridge Creek is a town in Eau Claire County, Wisconsin, United States. The population was 2,214 at the 2020 census. The city of Augusta is located entirely within the town of Bridge Creek. The unincorporated community of Hay Creek is also located in the town.

== Geography ==
According to the United States Census Bureau, the town has a total area of 104.3 square miles (270.1 km^{2}), of which 102.4 square miles (265.3 km^{2}) is land and 1.8 square miles (4.8 km^{2}) (1.76%) is water.

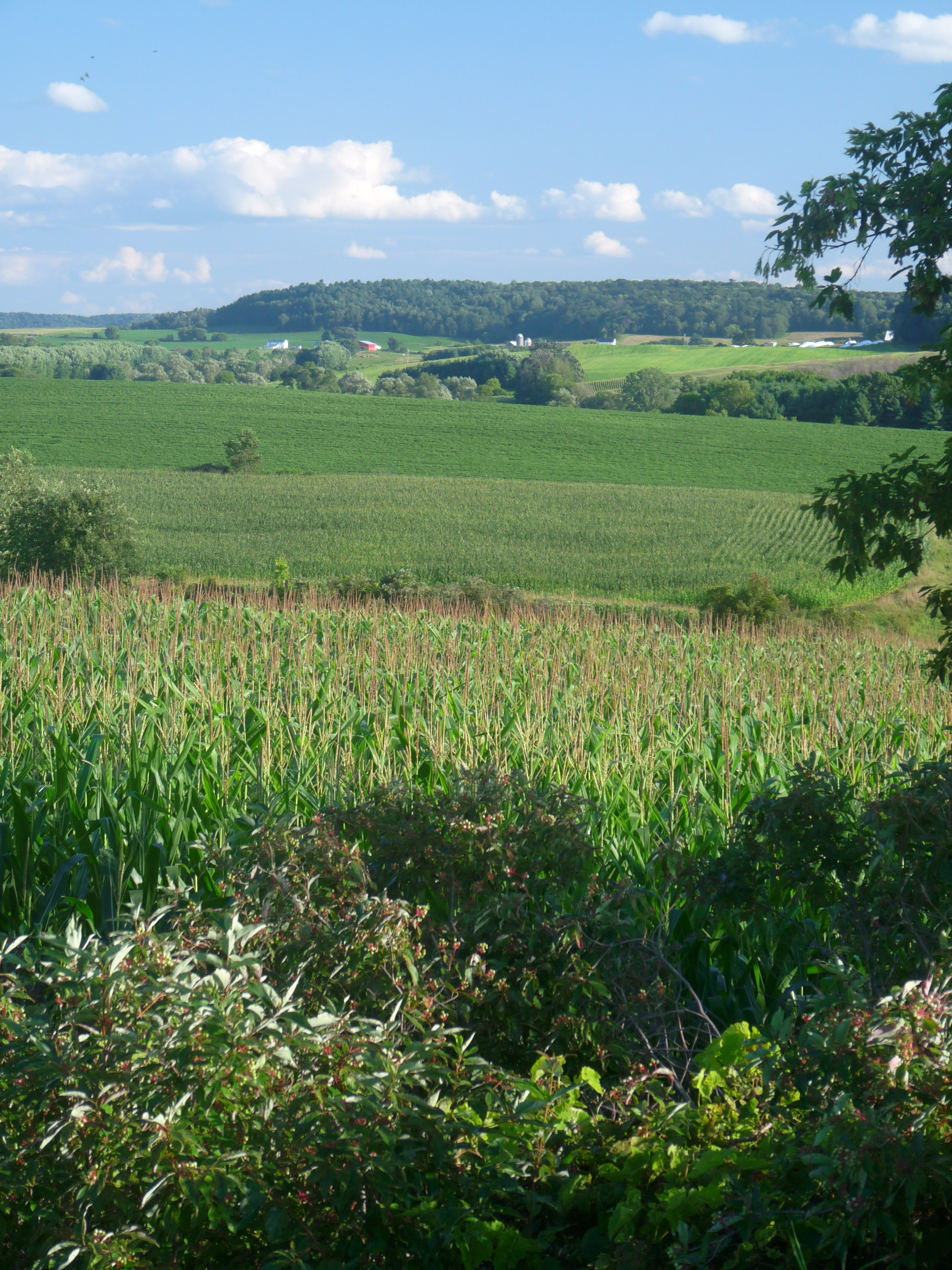
Much of Bridge Creek is rolling farmland

== Demographics ==
Historical population
Census	Pop.	Note	%±
1990	1,440		—
2000	1,844		28.1%
2010	1,900		3.0%
2020	2,214		16.5%

As of the census of 2000, there were 1,844 people, 557 households, and 451 families residing in the town. The population density was 18.0 people per square mile (7.0/km^{2}). There were 703 housing units at an average density of 6.9 per square mile (2.6/km^{2}). The racial makeup of the town was 98.59% White, 0.05% African American, 0.05% Native American, 0.27% Asian, 0.27% from other races, and 0.76% from two or more races. Hispanic or Latino of any race were 0.70% of the population.

There were 557 households, out of which 39.1% had children under the age of 18 living with them, 72.7% were married couples living together, 5.0% had a female householder with no husband present, and 18.9% were non-families. 15.4% of all households were made up of individuals, and 5.4% had someone living alone who was 65 years of age or older. The average household size was 3.31 and the average family size was 3.72.

The population was 37.3% under the age of 18, 6.9% from 18 to 24, 25.7% from 25 to 44, 21.1% from 45 to 64, and 9.0% who were 65 years of age or older. The median age was 30 years. For every 100 females, there were 102.9 males. For every 100 females age 18 and over, there were 101.6 males.

The median income for a household in the town was $34,348, and the median income for a family was $35,724. Males had a median income of $27,865 versus $21,957 for females. The per capita income for the town was $11,793. About 18.9% of families and 27.4% of the population were below the poverty line, including 42.8% of those under age 18 and 12.8% of those age 65 or over.

== Notable people ==
- Horace N. Polley, Wisconsin State Representative and farmer, lived in Bridge Creek
