= Oak Grove, Eau Claire County, Wisconsin =

Oak Grove, Wisconsin
- Ghost town
- Location within Wisconsin
- Coordinates: 44°40′21″N 91°36′19″W
- Country: United States
- State: Wisconsin
- County: Eau Claire
- Elevation: 955 ft (291 m)
- GNIS feature ID: 1578433

Oak Grove is a ghost town in Eau Claire County, Wisconsin, United States. Oak Grove was located in the town of Drammen along what is now Wisconsin Highway 37, 7.9 miles (12.7 km) east-northeast of Mondovi. The town was marked on USGS maps as late as 1932.
