= Ludington, Wisconsin =

Town of Ludington, Wisconsin
- Town
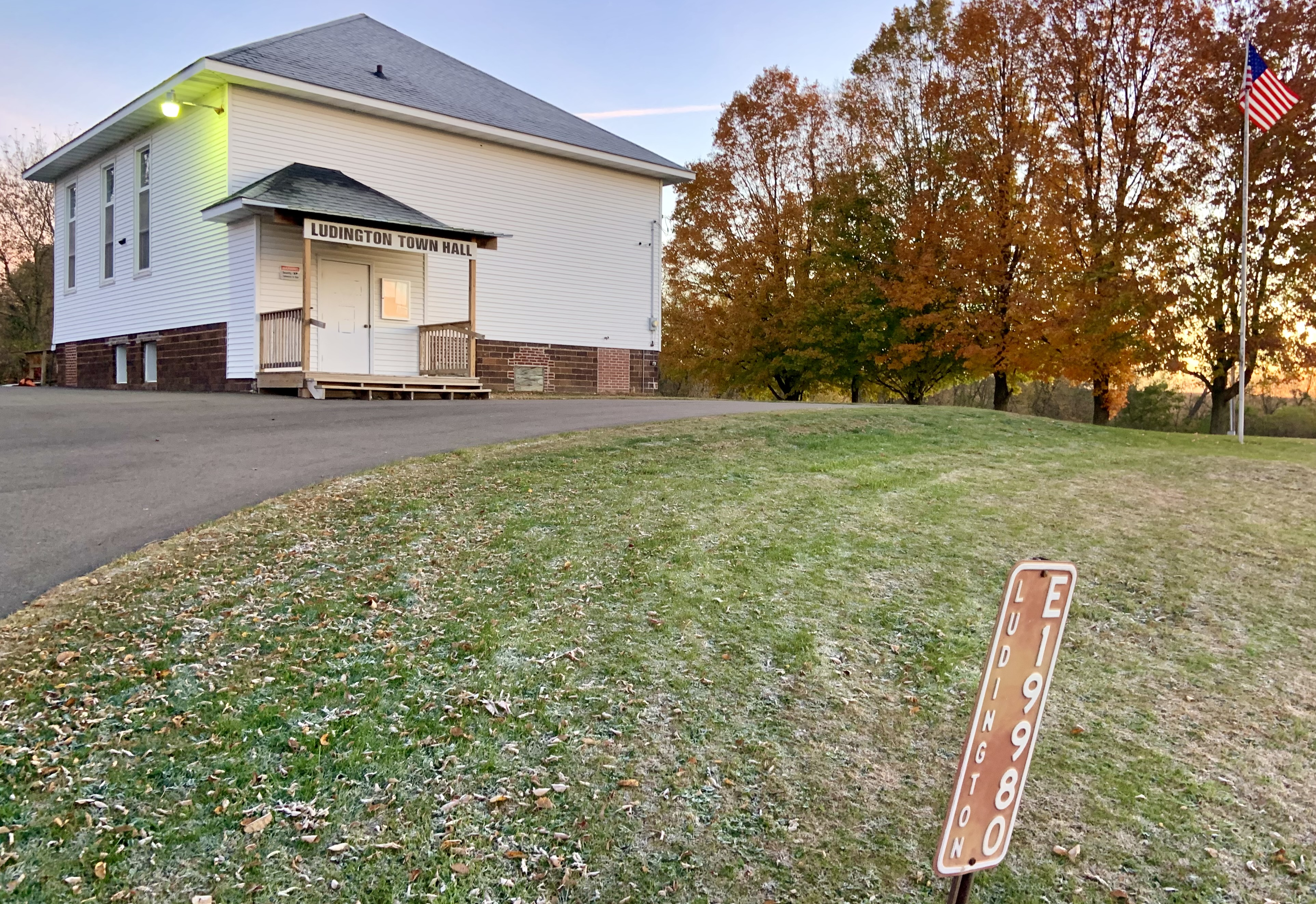
- Town hall

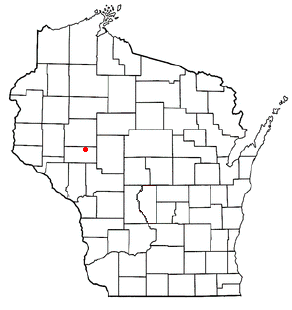
- Location of Ludington

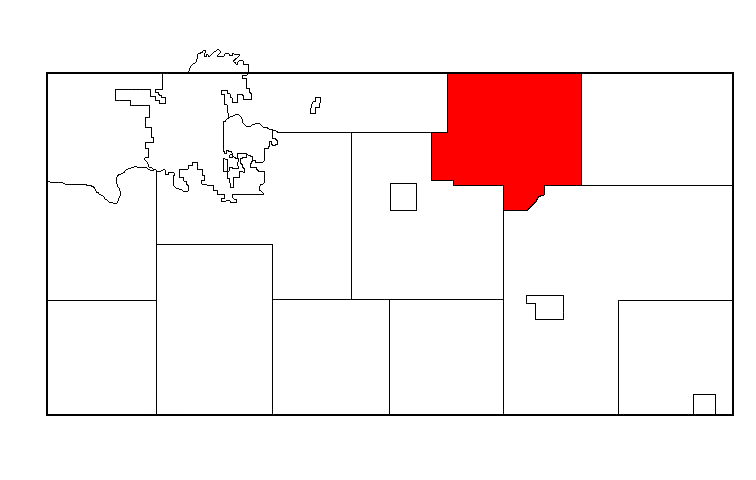
- Location of Ludington in Eau Claire County
- Coordinates: 44°47′36″N 91°10′33″W
- Country: United States
- State: Wisconsin
- County: Eau Claire

Area
  - Total: 45.9 sq mi (119.0 km^{2})
  - Land: 45.8 sq mi (118.5 km^{2})
  - Water: 0.19 sq mi (0.5 km^{2})
- Elevation: 1,030 ft (314 m)

Population (2020)
  - Total: 1,067
  - Density: 23.32/sq mi (9.004/km^{2})
- Time zone: UTC-6 (Central (CST))
  - Summer (DST): UTC-5 (CDT)
- Area codes: 715 & 534
- FIPS code: 55-46275
- GNIS feature ID: 1583609
- Website: https://www.townofludington.com/

Ludington is a town in Eau Claire County, Wisconsin, United States. The population was 1,067 at the 2020 census.

== Geography ==
According to the United States Census Bureau, the town has a total area of 46.0 square miles (119.1 km^{2}), of which 45.8 square miles (118.6 km^{2}) is land and 0.2 square miles (0.5 km^{2}) is water.

== Demographics ==
Historical population
| Census | Pop. | Note | %± |
|---|---|---|---|
| 1990 | 906 | | — |
| 2000 | 998 | | 10.2% |
| 2010 | 1,063 | | 6.5% |
| 2020 | 1,067 | | 0.4% |

As of the census of 2000, there were 998 people, 360 households, and 293 families residing in the town. The population density was 21.8 people per square mile (8.4/km^{2}). There were 407 housing units at an average density of 8.9 per square mile (3.4/km^{2}). The racial makeup of the town was 98.50% White, 0.10% African American, 0.20% Native American, 0.90% Asian, and 0.30% from two or more races. Hispanic or Latino of any race were 0.20% of the population.

There were 360 households, out of which 35.3% had children under the age of 18 living with them, 72.2% were married couples living together, 5.6% had a female householder with no husband present, and 18.6% were non-families. 14.2% of all households were made up of individuals, and 5.8% had someone living alone who was 65 years of age or older. The average household size was 2.77 and the average family size was 3.04.

The population was 26.3% under the age of 18, 7.6% from 18 to 24, 29.6% from 25 to 44, 26.1% from 45 to 64, and 10.5% who were 65 years of age or older. The median age was 38 years. For every 100 females, there were 106.6 males. For every 100 females age 18 and over, there were 102.2 males.

The median income for a household in the town was $42,396, and the median income for a family was $44,750. Males had a median income of $32,500 versus $21,974 for females. The per capita income for the town was $16,291. About 3.4% of families and 4.9% of the population were below the poverty line, including 7.2% of those under age 18 and none of those age 65 or over.
