= Otter Creek, Eau Claire County, Wisconsin =

Town of Otter Creek
- Town
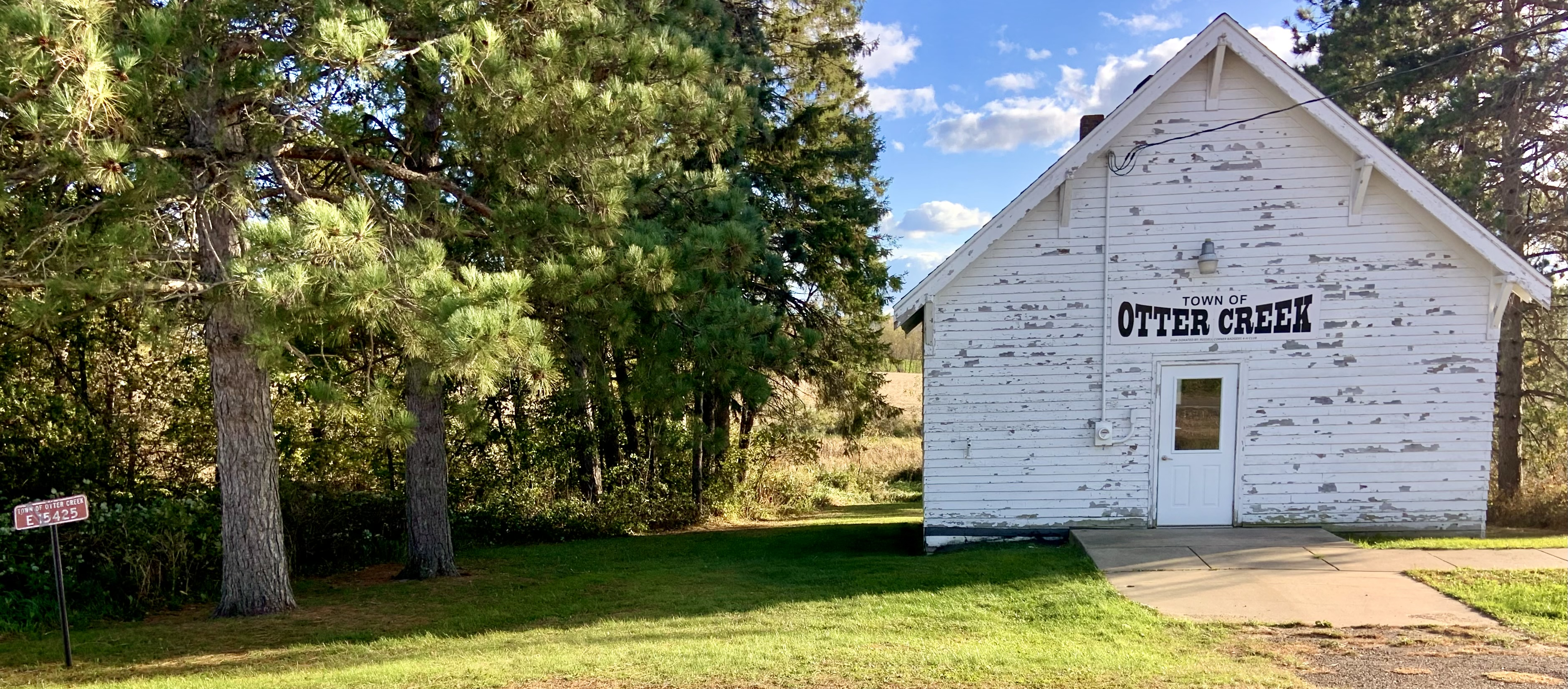
- Town hall

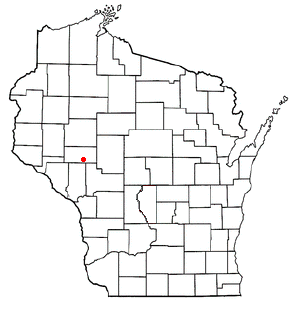
- Location of the town of Otter Creek

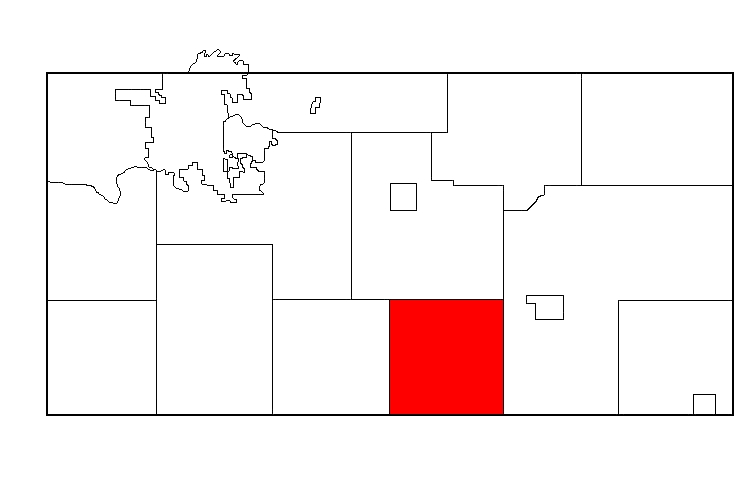
- Coordinates: 44°39′17″N 91°13′43″W
- Country: United States
- State: Wisconsin
- County: Eau Claire

Area
  - Total: 35.6 sq mi (92.1 km^{2})
  - Land: 35.6 sq mi (92.1 km^{2})
  - Water: 0 sq mi (0.0 km^{2})
- Elevation: 1,066 ft (325 m)

Population (2020)
  - Total: 427
  - Density: 12.0/sq mi (4.64/km^{2})
- Time zone: UTC-6 (Central (CST))
  - Summer (DST): UTC-5 (CDT)
- Area codes: 715 & 534
- FIPS code: 55-60750
- GNIS feature ID: 1583882

The Town of Otter Creek is located in Eau Claire County, Wisconsin, United States. The population was 427 at the 2020 census. The unincorporated community of Hale Corner is located in the town.

== Geography ==
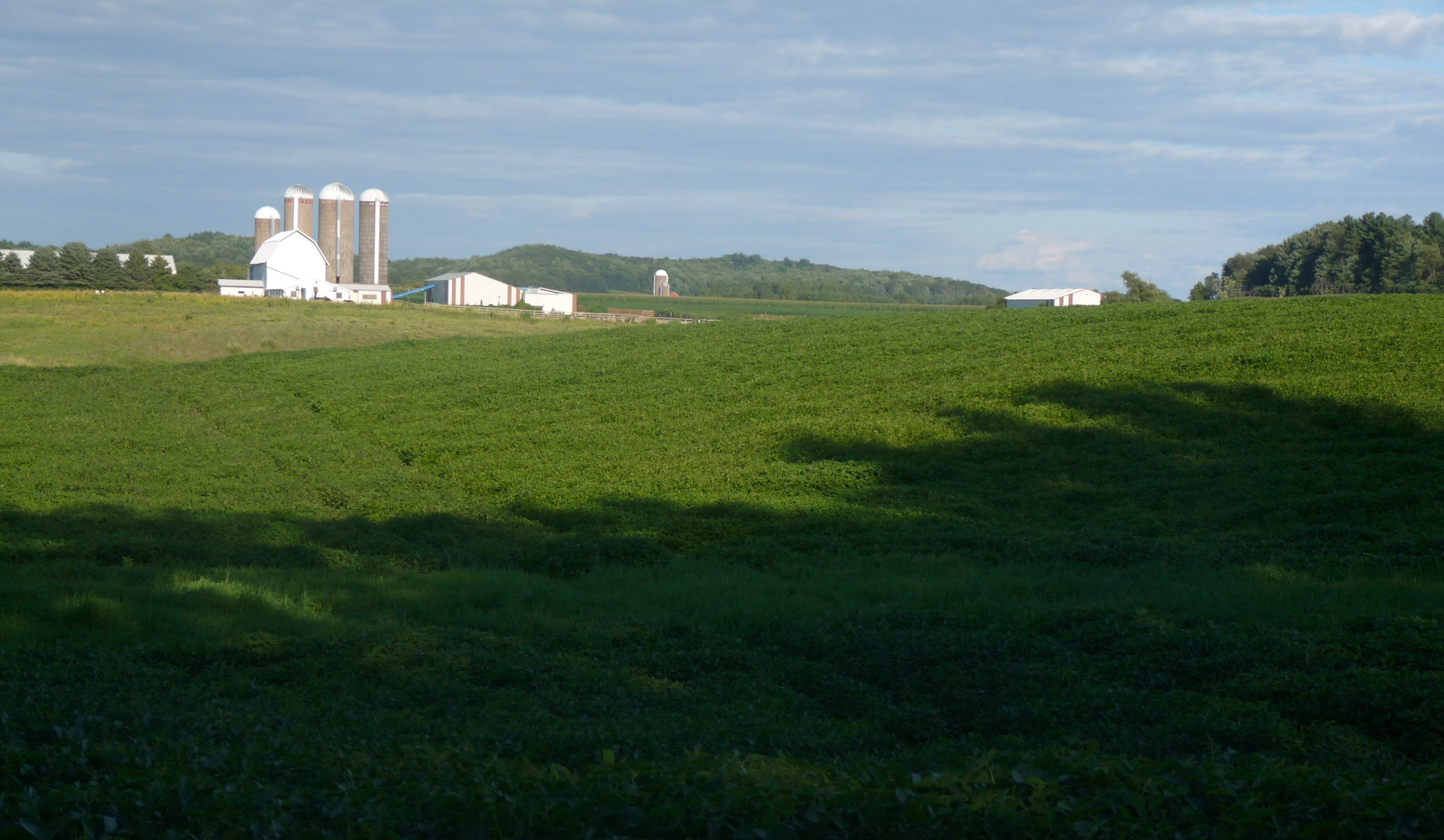
Much of Otter Creek is rolling farmland.

According to the United States Census Bureau, the town has a total area of 35.6 square miles (92.1 km^{2}), all land.

== Demographics ==
Historical population
Census	Pop.	Note	%±
1990	459		—
2000	531		15.7%
2010	500		−5.8%
2020	427		−14.6%

At the 2000 census, there were 531 people, 175 households and 141 families residing in the town. The population density was 14.9 per square mile (5.8/km^{2}). There were 183 housing units at an average density of 5.1 per square mile (2.0/km^{2}). The racial makeup of the town was 93.60% White, 0.19% African American, 0.75% Native American, 3.39% Asian, 0.56% from other races, and 1.51% from two or more races. Hispanic or Latino of any race were 0.75% of the population.

There were 175 households, of which 40.6% had children under the age of 18 living with them, 69.1% were married couples living together, 6.3% had a female householder with no husband present, and 19.4% were non-families. 16.0% of all households were made up of individuals, and 5.7% had someone living alone who was 65 years of age or older. The average household size was 3.03 and the average family size was 3.38.

Age distribution was 30.9% under the age of 18, 8.3% from 18 to 24, 30.9% from 25 to 44, 21.1% from 45 to 64, and 8.9% who were 65 years of age or older. The median age was 33 years. For every 100 females, there were 110 males. For every 100 females age 18 and over, there were 105 males.

The median household income was $45,893, and the median family income was $47,813. Males had a median income of $28,750 versus $20,809 for females. The per capita income for the town was $17,609. About 1.4% of families and 4.2% of the population were below the poverty line, including 4.9% of those under age 18 and 7.3% of those age 65 or over.
