= Nelsonville, Eau Claire County, Wisconsin =

Nelsonville, Wisconsin
- Ghost town
- Location within Wisconsin
- Coordinates: 44°39′15″N 91°34′12″W
- Country: United States
- State: Wisconsin
- County: Eau Claire
- Elevation: 997 ft (304 m)
- GNIS feature ID: 1578432

Nelsonville is a ghost town in Eau Claire County, Wisconsin, United States. Nelsonville was located in the town of Drammen at what is currently the junction of County Highways B and ZZ, 7.8 miles (12.6 km) northeast of Mondovi. The town was marked on USGS maps as late as 1932.
