= Truax, Wisconsin =

- Unincorporated community
- Location within Wisconsin Location within the United States
- Coordinates: 44°50′57″N 91°34′10″W
- Country: United States
- State: Wisconsin
- County: Eau Claire
- Elevation: 896 ft (273 m)
- Time zone: UTC-6 (Central (CST))
  - Summer (DST): UTC-5 (CDT)
- Area codes: 715 & 534
- GNIS feature ID: 1578444

Truax is an unincorporated community located in the town of Union, Eau Claire County, Wisconsin, United States. Truax is located along the Union Pacific Railroad near the northwestern boundary of Eau Claire.

== History ==
The community was named for the Truax family, which owned land in the area.
