= Rodell, Wisconsin =

- Unincorporated community
- Location within Wisconsin Location within the United States
- Coordinates: 44°43′12″N 91°11′18″W
- Country: United States
- State: Wisconsin
- County: Eau Claire
- Elevation: 938 ft (286 m)
- Time zone: UTC-6 (Central (CST))
  - Summer (DST): UTC-5 (CDT)
- Area codes: 715 & 534
- GNIS feature ID: 1572523

Rodell is an unincorporated community located in the town of Lincoln, Eau Claire County, Wisconsin, United States. The name of the community is an early 20th-century modification of Rosedale, the original name of the Chicago & North Western station.
