= Eau Claire County, Wisconsin =

County in Wisconsin, United States

- County
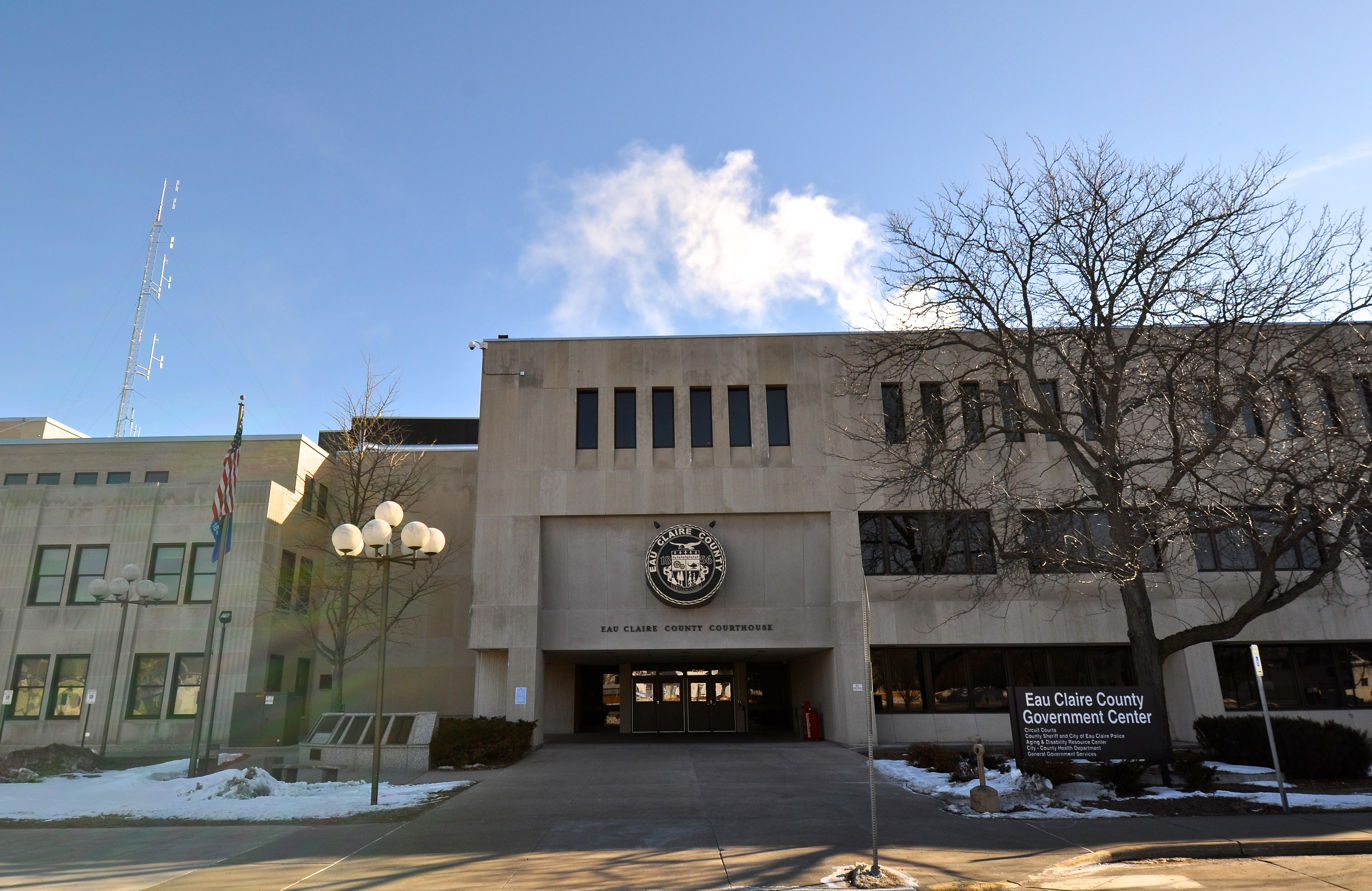
- Eau Claire County Courthouse, February 2015

- Location within the U.S. state of Wisconsin
- Coordinates: 44°44′N 91°17′W
- Country: United States
- State: Wisconsin
- Founded: 1856
- Named for: Eau Claire River
- Seat: Eau Claire
- Largest city: Eau Claire

Government
  - County Administrator: Kathryn Schauf

Area
  - Total: 645 sq mi (1,670 km^{2})
  - Land: 638 sq mi (1,650 km^{2})
  - Water: 7.3 sq mi (19 km^{2}) 1.1%

Population (2020)
  - Total: 105,710
  - Estimate (2025): 109,033 ▲
  - Density: 170.6/sq mi (65.9/km^{2})
- Time zone: UTC−6 (Central)
  - Summer (DST): UTC−5 (CDT)
- Congressional district: 3rd
- Website: www.eauclairecounty.gov

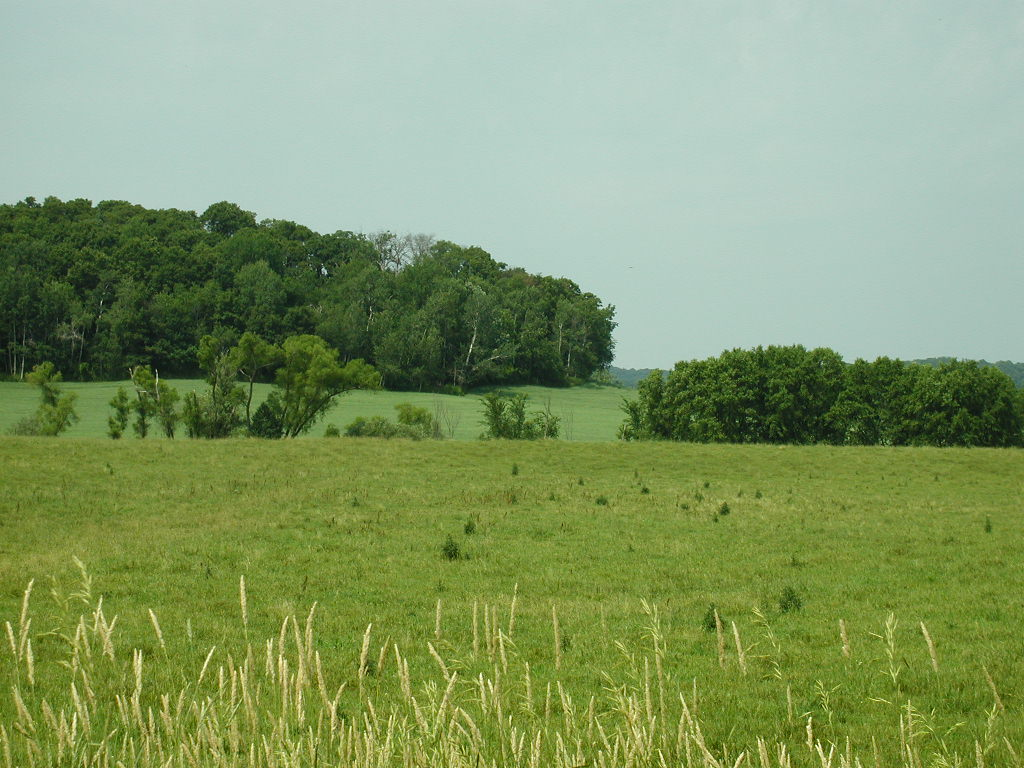
Fields in Eau Claire County

Eau Claire County (/oʊˈklɛər/) is a county located in the U.S. state of Wisconsin. As of the 2020 census, the population was 105,710. Its county seat is Eau Claire. The county took its name from the Eau Claire River.

Eau Claire County is included in the Eau Claire, WI Metropolitan Statistical Area as well as the Eau Claire–Menomonie WI Combined Statistical Area.

== History ==
Eau Claire county was originally set off as the Town of Clearwater in Chippewa County in 1855. The name was changed to the Town of Eau Claire on March 31, 1856. The entire town was separated as Eau Claire County by an act of the Wisconsin State Legislature on October 6, 1856.

== Geography ==
According to the U.S. Census Bureau, the county has a total area of 645 square miles (1,670 km^{2}), of which 638 square miles (1,650 km^{2}) is land and 7.3 square miles (19 km^{2}) (1.1%) is water.

=== Adjacent counties ===
- Chippewa County – north
- Clark County – east
- Jackson County – southeast
- Trempealeau County – south
- Buffalo County – southwest
- Pepin County – west
- Dunn County – west

== Demographics and religion statistics ==
Historical population
| Census | Pop. | Note | %± |
|---|---|---|---|
| 1860 | 3,162 | | — |
| 1870 | 10,769 | | 240.6% |
| 1880 | 19,993 | | 85.7% |
| 1890 | 30,673 | | 53.4% |
| 1900 | 31,692 | | 3.3% |
| 1910 | 32,721 | | 3.2% |
| 1920 | 35,771 | | 9.3% |
| 1930 | 41,087 | | 14.9% |
| 1940 | 46,999 | | 14.4% |
| 1950 | 54,187 | | 15.3% |
| 1960 | 58,300 | | 7.6% |
| 1970 | 67,219 | | 15.3% |
| 1980 | 78,805 | | 17.2% |
| 1990 | 85,183 | | 8.1% |
| 2000 | 93,142 | | 9.3% |
| 2010 | 98,736 | | 6.0% |
| 2020 | 105,710 | | 7.1% |
| 2025 (est.) | 109,033 | ▲ | 3.1% |
U.S. Decennial Census; 1790–1960 1900–1990; 1990–2000 2010 2020

=== Racial and ethnic composition ===
Eau Claire County, Wisconsin – Racial and ethnic composition Note: the US Census treats Hispanic/Latino as an ethnic category. This table excludes Latinos from the racial categories and assigns them to a separate category. Hispanics/Latinos may be of any race.
| Race / ethnicity (NH = Non-Hispanic) | Pop 1980 | Pop 1990 | Pop 2000 | Pop 2010 | Pop 2020 | % 1980 | % 1990 | % 2000 | % 2010 | % 2020 |
|---|---|---|---|---|---|---|---|---|---|---|
| White alone (NH) | 77,719 | 81,939 | 87,936 | 90,918 | 92,354 | 98.62% | 96.19% | 94.41% | 92.08% | 87.37% |
| Black or African American alone (NH) | 139 | 230 | 471 | 837 | 1,213 | 0.18% | 0.27% | 0.51% | 0.85% | 1.15% |
| Native American or Alaska Native alone (NH) | 284 | 450 | 484 | 430 | 440 | 0.36% | 0.53% | 0.52% | 0.44% | 0.42% |
| Asian alone (NH) | 281 | 2,104 | 2,332 | 3,276 | 4,365 | 0.36% | 2.47% | 2.50% | 3.32% | 4.13% |
| Native Hawaiian or Pacific Islander alone (NH) | x | x | 30 | 30 | 83 | x | x | 0.03% | 0.03% | 0.08% |
| Other race alone (NH) | 121 | 23 | 71 | 50 | 251 | 0.15% | 0.03% | 0.08% | 0.05% | 0.24% |
| Mixed race or Multiracial (NH) | x | x | 939 | 1,391 | 3,886 | x | x | 1.01% | 1.41% | 3.68% |
| Hispanic or Latino (any race) | 261 | 437 | 879 | 1,804 | 3,118 | 0.33% | 0.51% | 0.94% | 1.83% | 2.95% |
| Total | 78,805 | 85,183 | 93,142 | 98,736 | 105,710 | 100.00% | 100.00% | 100.00% | 100.00% | 100.00% |

=== 2020 census ===
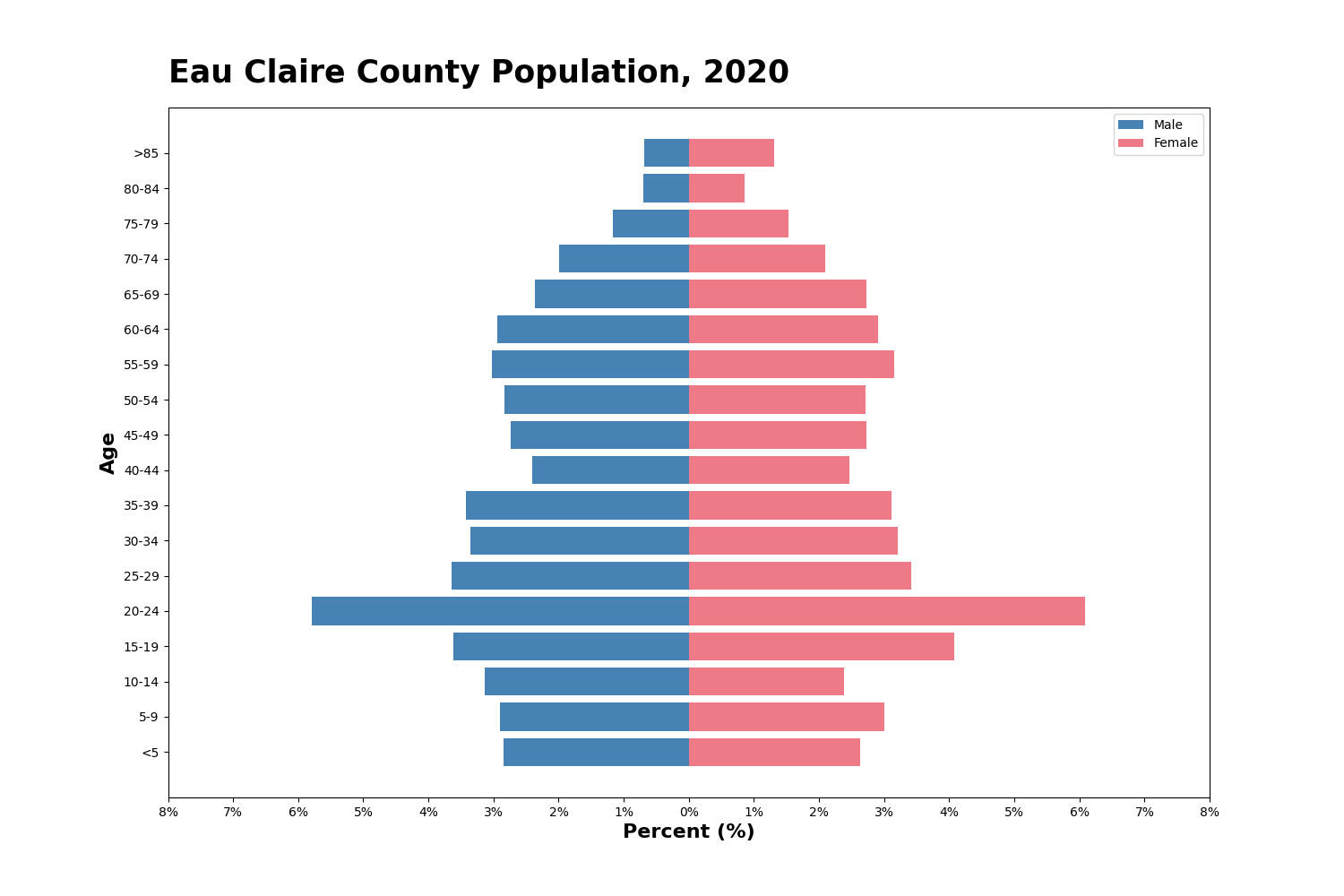
2020 Eau Claire County population pyramid

As of the 2020 census, the county had a population of 105,710. The population density was 165.7 people per square mile (64.0 people/km^{2}). There were 44,966 housing units at an average density of 70.5 units per square mile (27.2 units/km^{2}).

The median age was 35.6 years. 20.7% of residents were under the age of 18 and 16.9% of residents were 65 years of age or older. For every 100 females there were 96.5 males, and for every 100 females age 18 and over there were 93.8 males age 18 and over.

The racial makeup of the county was 88.2% White, 1.2% Black or African American, 0.5% American Indian and Alaska Native, 4.2% Asian, 0.1% Native Hawaiian and Pacific Islander, 1.1% from some other race, and 4.7% from two or more races. Hispanic or Latino residents of any race comprised 2.9% of the population.

76.3% of residents lived in urban areas, while 23.7% lived in rural areas.

There were 42,880 households in the county, of which 26.3% had children under the age of 18 living in them. Of all households, 44.7% were married-couple households, 20.3% were households with a male householder and no spouse or partner present, and 26.6% were households with a female householder and no spouse or partner present. About 30.6% of all households were made up of individuals and 11.7% had someone living alone who was 65 years of age or older.

Of those 44,966 housing units, 4.6% were vacant. Among occupied housing units, 62.2% were owner-occupied and 37.8% were renter-occupied. The homeowner vacancy rate was 0.8% and the rental vacancy rate was 3.7%.

2000 Census Age Pyramid for Eau Claire County

=== 2000 census ===
As of the 2000 census, there were 93,142 people, 35,822 households, and 22,281 families residing in the county. The population density was 146 people per square mile (56 people/km^{2}). There were 37,474 housing units at an average density of 59 units per square mile (23 units/km^{2}). The racial makeup of the county was 94.96% White, 0.52% Black or African American, 0.54% Native American, 2.52% Asian, 0.03% Pacific Islander, 0.33% from other races, and 1.11% from two or more races. 0.94% of the population were Hispanic or Latino of any race. 37.4% were of German, 21.5% Norwegian and 7.0% Irish ancestry. 94.2% spoke English, 1.6% Hmong, 1.6% Spanish and 1.0% German as their first language.

There were 35,822 households, out of which 30.00% had children under the age of 18 living with them, 50.60% were married couples living together, 8.60% had a female householder with no husband present, and 37.80% were non-families. 27.10% of all households were made up of individuals, and 10.10% had someone living alone who was 65 years of age or older. The average household size was 2.46 and the average family size was 3.02.

In the county, the population was spread out, with 23.40% under the age of 18, 17.10% from 18 to 24, 26.70% from 25 to 44, 20.50% from 45 to 64, and 12.20% who were 65 years of age or older. The median age was 32 years. For every 100 females, there were 93.80 males. For every 100 females age 18 and over, there were 90.60 males.

In 2017, there were 1,191 births, giving a general fertility rate of 52.8 births per 1000 women aged 15–44, the tenth lowest rate out of all 72 Wisconsin counties. Of these, 99 of the births occurred at home, the third highest for Wisconsin counties.

In 2010, the largest religious groups by reported number of adherents were Catholic at 16,240 adherents, ELCA Lutheran at 15,067 adherents, Missouri Synod Lutheran at 6,953 adherents, LCMC Lutheran at 3,355 adherents, United Methodist at 2,177 adherents, non-denominational Christian at 1,557 adherents, Lutheran Brethren at 1,391 adherents, United Church of Christ at 1,046 adherents, Assemblies of God at 969 adherents, Amish at 794 adherents, Wisconsin Synod Lutheran at 757 adherents, ELS Lutheran at 708 adherents, and LDS (Mormon) at 703 adherents.

== Transportation ==
=== Major highways ===
- Interstate 94
- U.S. Highway 10
- U.S. Highway 12
- U.S. Highway 53
- Highway 27 (Wisconsin)
- Highway 37 (Wisconsin)
- Highway 85 (Wisconsin)
- Highway 93 (Wisconsin)
- Highway 312 (Wisconsin)

=== Railroads ===
- Union Pacific

=== Buses ===
- Eau Claire Transit

=== Airport ===
Eau Claire county is served by the Chippewa Valley Regional Airport (KEAU).

== Government ==
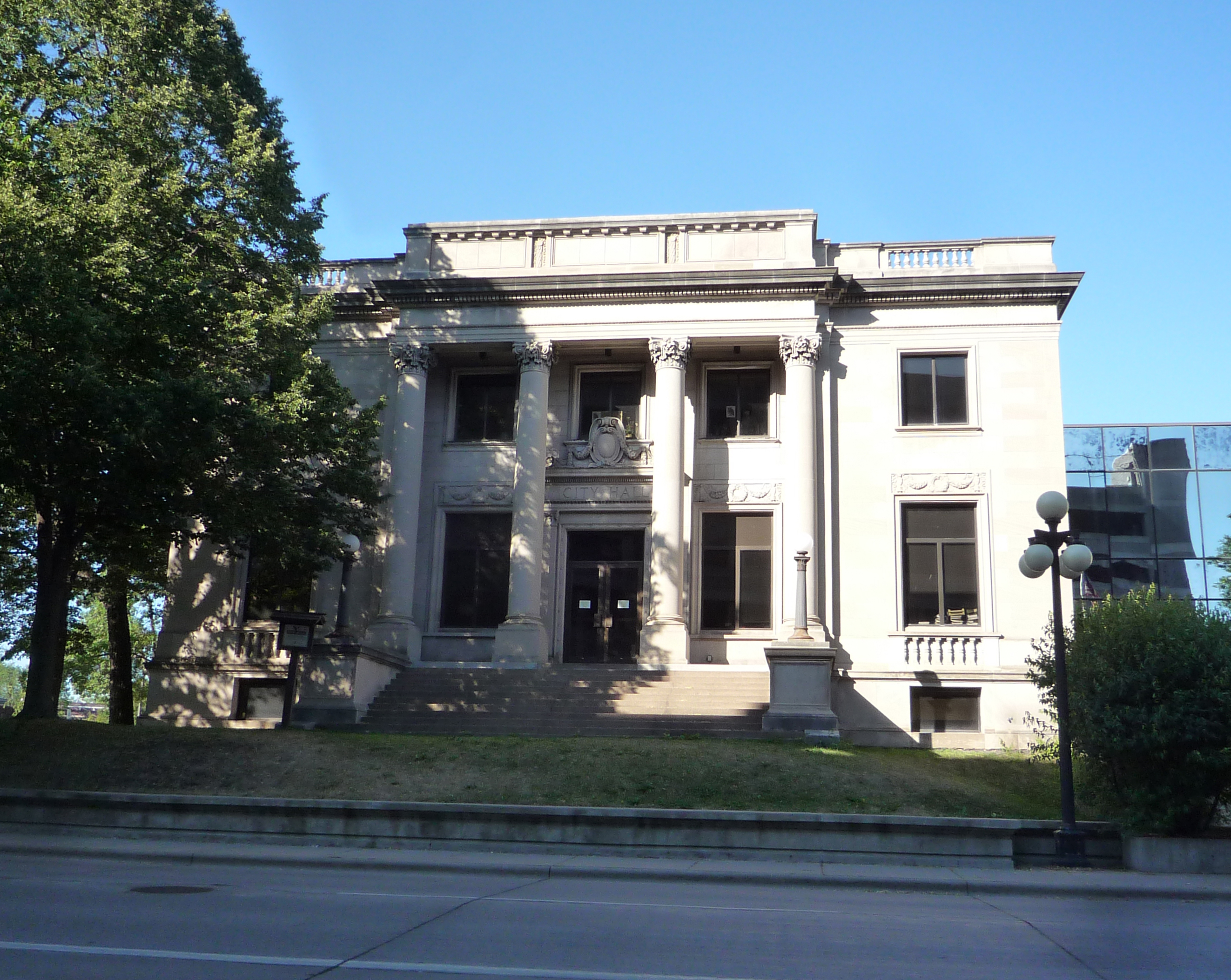
Eau Claire City Hall (listed on the NRHP)

The legislative body of Eau Claire County is the non-partisan 29-member Eau Claire County Board of Supervisors. Members of the board of supervisors are elected by district and the chairperson and vice-chair positions are elected from within members of the board.

The board meets in the Eau Claire County Courthouse in downtown Eau Claire, with its weekly meetings televised on local public television and transcripts published online. Most items are approved on a "consent calendar" without discussion. Public comment is limited to three minutes per individual per item.

Eau Claire County is in Wisconsin State Senate district 31, represented by Jeff Smith (D). The county is divided into two Wisconsin assembly districts: Assembly district 93 which is represented by Christian Phelps (D), as well as district 91 which is represented by Jodi Emerson (D). At the federal level, the entire county is contained within Wisconsin's third congressional district, which is represented in the United States House of Representatives by Derrick Van Orden (R).

In presidential elections, due in part to the presence of the University of Wisconsin–Eau Claire, Eau Claire County is solidly Democratic. The last Republican to win the county was Ronald Reagan in his landslide re-election of 1984, and even then he only won the county by a margin of 2.64 percent, smaller than Richard Nixon's margin of 5.12 percent in his landslide 1972 re-election.

United States presidential election results for Eau Claire County, Wisconsin
| Year | Republican | | Democratic | | Third party(ies) | |
| Year | No. | % | No. | % | No. | % |
|---|---|---|---|---|---|---|
| 1892 | 2,719 | 47.80% | 2,383 | 41.90% | 586 | 10.30% |
| 1896 | 4,522 | 63.42% | 2,364 | 33.16% | 244 | 3.42% |
| 1900 | 4,378 | 66.44% | 1,967 | 29.85% | 244 | 3.70% |
| 1904 | 4,343 | 73.08% | 1,224 | 20.60% | 376 | 6.33% |
| 1908 | 3,981 | 64.50% | 1,859 | 30.12% | 332 | 5.38% |
| 1912 | 2,013 | 40.29% | 1,727 | 34.57% | 1,256 | 25.14% |
| 1916 | 2,922 | 53.00% | 2,290 | 41.54% | 301 | 5.46% |
| 1920 | 7,856 | 81.62% | 1,193 | 12.39% | 576 | 5.98% |
| 1924 | 5,149 | 46.46% | 629 | 5.68% | 5,305 | 47.87% |
| 1928 | 10,079 | 69.25% | 4,385 | 30.13% | 91 | 0.63% |
| 1932 | 7,487 | 48.80% | 7,565 | 49.31% | 291 | 1.90% |
| 1936 | 6,802 | 39.41% | 10,065 | 58.31% | 393 | 2.28% |
| 1940 | 9,595 | 48.38% | 10,129 | 51.07% | 108 | 0.54% |
| 1944 | 9,470 | 51.13% | 8,962 | 48.39% | 88 | 0.48% |
| 1948 | 7,825 | 43.37% | 9,971 | 55.27% | 246 | 1.36% |
| 1952 | 14,069 | 59.47% | 9,554 | 40.38% | 35 | 0.15% |
| 1956 | 13,122 | 58.48% | 9,276 | 41.34% | 41 | 0.18% |
| 1960 | 14,427 | 56.13% | 11,240 | 43.73% | 37 | 0.14% |
| 1964 | 8,700 | 35.48% | 15,775 | 64.33% | 46 | 0.19% |
| 1968 | 11,799 | 46.66% | 12,302 | 48.65% | 1,186 | 4.69% |
| 1972 | 15,883 | 51.33% | 14,300 | 46.21% | 760 | 2.46% |
| 1976 | 16,388 | 46.36% | 18,263 | 51.66% | 702 | 1.99% |
| 1980 | 17,304 | 44.46% | 17,602 | 45.22% | 4,016 | 10.32% |
| 1984 | 20,401 | 51.09% | 19,347 | 48.45% | 181 | 0.45% |
| 1988 | 17,664 | 45.27% | 21,150 | 54.20% | 209 | 0.54% |
| 1992 | 15,915 | 33.81% | 21,221 | 45.08% | 9,940 | 21.11% |
| 1996 | 13,900 | 34.41% | 20,298 | 50.26% | 6,192 | 15.33% |
| 2000 | 20,921 | 43.70% | 24,078 | 50.29% | 2,876 | 6.01% |
| 2004 | 24,653 | 44.47% | 30,068 | 54.24% | 716 | 1.29% |
| 2008 | 20,959 | 38.10% | 33,146 | 60.25% | 905 | 1.65% |
| 2012 | 23,256 | 42.43% | 30,666 | 55.95% | 884 | 1.61% |
| 2016 | 23,331 | 42.40% | 27,340 | 49.69% | 4,354 | 7.91% |
| 2020 | 25,341 | 43.49% | 31,620 | 54.26% | 1,314 | 2.25% |
| 2024 | 27,728 | 43.89% | 34,400 | 54.45% | 1,049 | 1.66% |

== Recreation ==
Attractions include the Chippewa Valley Museum in Eau Claire, Dells Mill Museum in Augusta, Dells Mill Water Powered Museum in Augusta, the Paul Bunyan Logging Camp in Eau Claire, and the Sarge Boyd Bandshell in Eau Claire.

== Communities ==
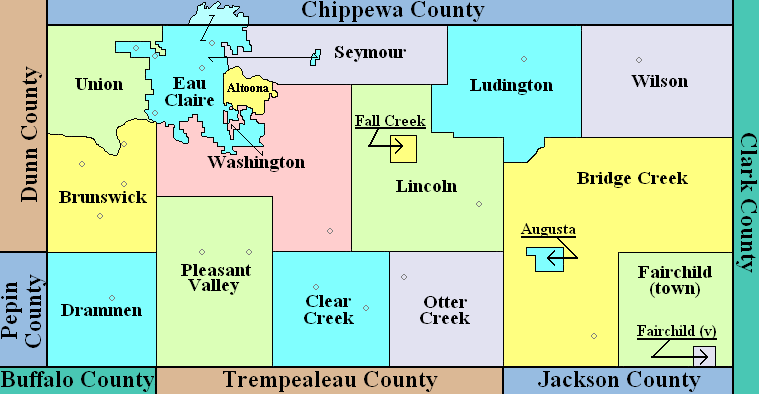
Political map of Eau Claire County, showing major and minor civil divisions, and adjacent counties. Note: A small portion of the city of Eau Claire is in Chippewa Co.

=== Cities ===
- Altoona
- Augusta
- Eau Claire (county seat; partly in Chippewa County)

=== Villages ===
- Fairchild
- Fall Creek

=== Towns ===
- Bridge Creek
- Brunswick
- Clear Creek
- Drammen
- Fairchild
- Lincoln
- Ludington
- Otter Creek
- Pleasant Valley
- Seymour
- Union
- Washington
- Wilson

=== Census-designated places ===
- Seymour

=== Unincorporated communities ===
- Allen
- Brackett
- Candy Corners
- Cleghorn
- Foster
- Hale Corner
- Hay Creek
- Ludington
- Lufkin
- Mount Hope Corners
- Rodell
- Truax
- Union
- Wilson

=== Ghost towns/neighborhoods ===
- Hadleyville^{‡}
- Nelsonville^{‡}
- Oak Grove^{‡}
- Porter's Mills^{‡}
- Shawtown^{§}

Footnotes

^{‡} Historical community
^{§} Now part of the City of Eau Claire

== See also ==
- National Register of Historic Places listings in Eau Claire County, Wisconsin
