= Washington, Eau Claire County, Wisconsin =

Washington, Wisconsin
- Town
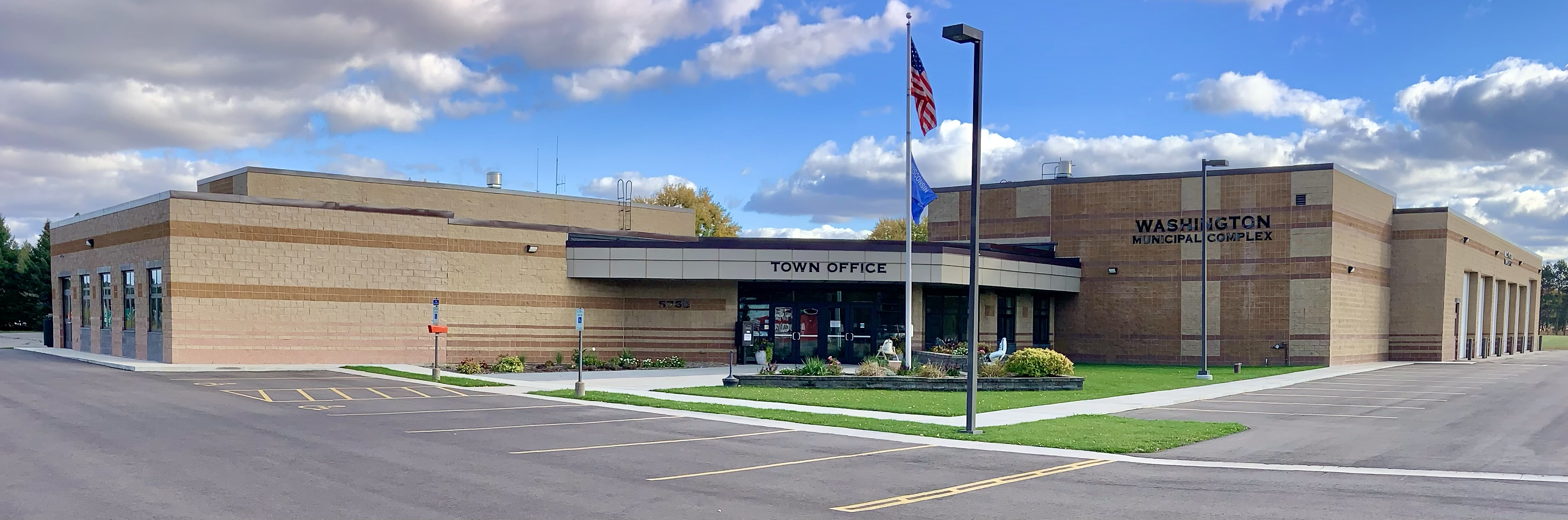
- Washington Town Hall

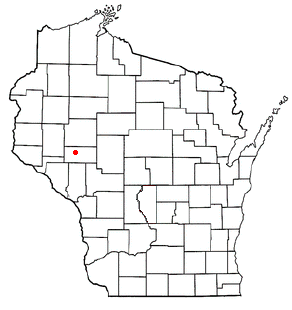
- Location of Washington in Wisconsin

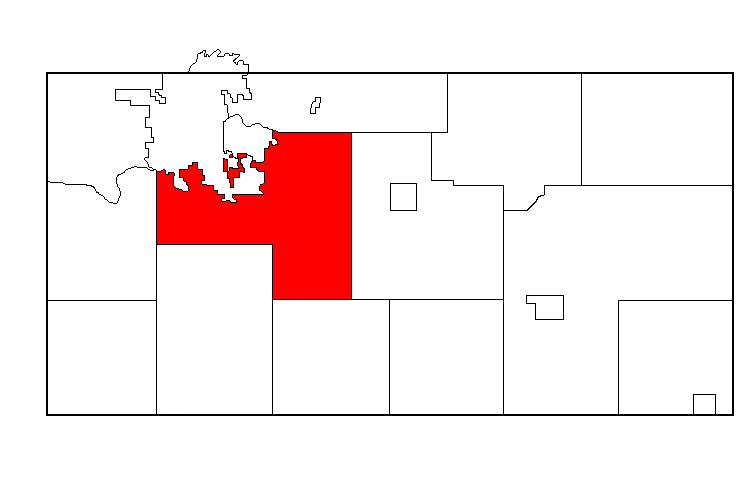
- Location of Washington in Eau Claire County
- Coordinates: 44°46′12″N 91°25′15″W
- Country: United States
- State: Wisconsin
- County: Eau Claire

Area
  - Total: 56.5 sq mi (146.4 km^{2})
  - Land: 56.1 sq mi (145.2 km^{2})
  - Water: 0.46 sq mi (1.2 km^{2})
- Elevation: 889 ft (271 m)

Population (2020)
  - Total: 7,662
  - Density: 136.7/sq mi (52.77/km^{2})
- Time zone: UTC-6 (Central (CST))
  - Summer (DST): UTC-5 (CDT)
- Area codes: 715 & 534
- FIPS code: 55-83612
- GNIS feature ID: 1584353
- Website: https://townofwashington.wi.gov/

Washington is a town in Eau Claire County, Wisconsin, United States. The population was 7,662 at the 2020 census, making it the county's second-most-populous municipality. The town is located along most of the south side of the cities of Eau Claire and Altoona. The unincorporated community of Brackett is located within the town.

== Geography ==
According to the United States Census Bureau, the town has a total area of 56.5 square miles (146.4 km^{2}), of which 56.1 square miles (145.2 km^{2}) is land and 0.5 square miles (1.2 km^{2}) (0.83%) is water.

== Demographics ==
Historical population
Census	Pop.	Note	%±
1990	6,226		—
2000	6,995		12.4%
2010	7,182		2.7%
2020 (est.)	7,752		7.9%

At the 2000 census, there were 6,995 people, 2,555 households and 1,992 families residing in the town. The population density was 124.8 per square mile (48.2/km^{2}). There were 2,615 housing units at an average density of 46.6 per square mile (18.0/km^{2}). The racial makeup of the town was 96.28% White, 0.34% African American, 0.53% Native American, 1.46% Asian, 0.43% from other races, and 0.96% from two or more races. Hispanic or Latino of any race were 1.06% of the population.

There were 2,555 households, of which 37.2% had children under the age of 18 living with them, 68.3% were married couples living together, 6.9% had a female householder with no husband present, and 22.0% were non-families. 17.4% of all households were made up of individuals, and 7.2% had someone living alone who was 65 years of age or older. The average household size was 2.68 and the average family size was 3.03.

Age distribution was 27.5% under the age of 18, 7.9% from 18 to 24, 25.9% from 25 to 44, 27.9% from 45 to 64, and 10.8% who were 65 years of age or older. The median age was 38 years. For every 100 females, there were 99.5 males. For every 100 females age 18 and over, there were 97.6 males.

The median household income was $55,570, and the median family income was $61,392. Males had a median income of $42,813 versus $23,690 for females. The per capita income for the town was $27,026. About 2.1% of families and 4.1% of the population were below the poverty line, including 4.6% of those under age 18 and 4.6% of those age 65 or over.

== Notable people ==
- Rush Bullis, Wisconsin State Representative and farmer, lived in the town
