= Seymour, Eau Claire County, Wisconsin =

Seymour, Wisconsin
- Town
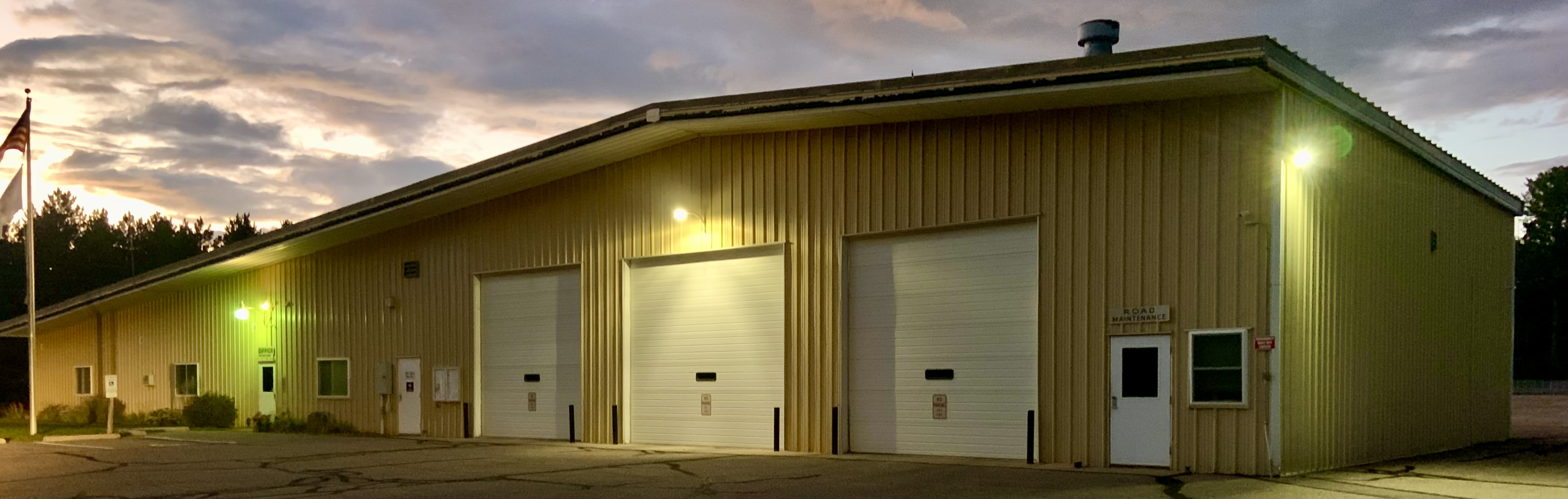
- Town hall

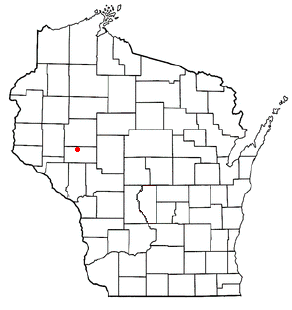
- Location of Seymour in Wisconsin

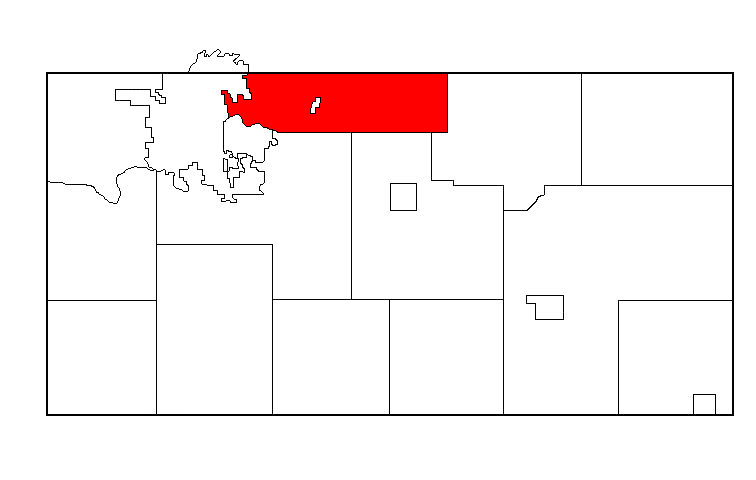
- Location of Seymour in Eau Claire County
- Coordinates: 44°50′2″N 91°22′28″W
- Country: United States
- State: Wisconsin
- County: Eau Claire

Area
  - Total: 32.2 sq mi (83.5 km^{2})
  - Land: 31.2 sq mi (80.7 km^{2})
  - Water: 1.1 sq mi (2.8 km^{2})
- Elevation: 912 ft (278 m)

Population (2020)
  - Total: 3,352
  - Density: 108/sq mi (41.5/km^{2})
- Time zone: UTC-6 (Central (CST))
  - Summer (DST): UTC-5 (CDT)
- Area codes: 715 & 534
- FIPS code: 55-72675
- GNIS feature ID: 1584127

Seymour is a town in Eau Claire County, Wisconsin, United States. The population was 3,352 at the 2020 census. The unincorporated community of Seymour is located in the southwestern portion of the town.

== Geography ==
According to the United States Census Bureau, the town has a total area of 32.2 square miles (83.5 km^{2}), of which 31.2 square miles (80.7 km^{2}) is land and 1.1 square miles (2.8 km^{2}) (3.32%) is water.

== Demographics ==
Historical population
Census	Pop.	Note	%±
1930	570		—
1940	1,283		125.1%
1950	1,248		−2.7%
1960	1,879		50.6%
1970	2,217		18.0%
1980	2,599		17.2%
1990	2,757		6.1%
2000	2,978		8.0%
2010	3,209		7.8%
2020 (est.)	3,352		4.5%

As of the census of 2000, there were 2,978 people, 1,108 households, and 863 families residing in the town. The population density was 95.6 people per square mile (36.9/km^{2}). There were 1,151 housing units at an average density of 36.9 per square mile (14.3/km^{2}). The racial makeup of the town was 97.85% White, 0.10% Black or African American, 0.54% Native American, 0.84% Asian, 0.03% Pacific Islander, 0.10% from other races, and 0.54% from two or more races. 0.84% of the population were Hispanic or Latino of any race.

There were 1,108 households, out of which 35.2% had children under the age of 18 living with them, 69.0% were married couples living together, 5.0% had a female householder with no husband present, and 22.1% were non-families. 16.1% of all households were made up of individuals, and 5.7% had someone living alone who was 65 years of age or older. The average household size was 2.69 and the average family size was 3.02.

The population was 26.1% under the age of 18, 5.6% from 18 to 24, 29.9% from 25 to 44, 28.0% from 45 to 64, and 10.5% who were 65 years of age or older. The median age was 39 years. For every 100 females, there were 109.1 males. For every 100 females age 18 and over, there were 105.5 males.

The median income for a household in the town was $48,365, and the median income for a family was $50,969. Males had a median income of $37,963 versus $27,958 for females. The per capita income for the town was $20,263. About 1.6% of families and 3.7% of the population were below the poverty line, including 4.3% of those under age 18 and 4.0% of those age 65 or over.
