= Union, Eau Claire County, Wisconsin =

Town of Union, Wisconsin
- Town
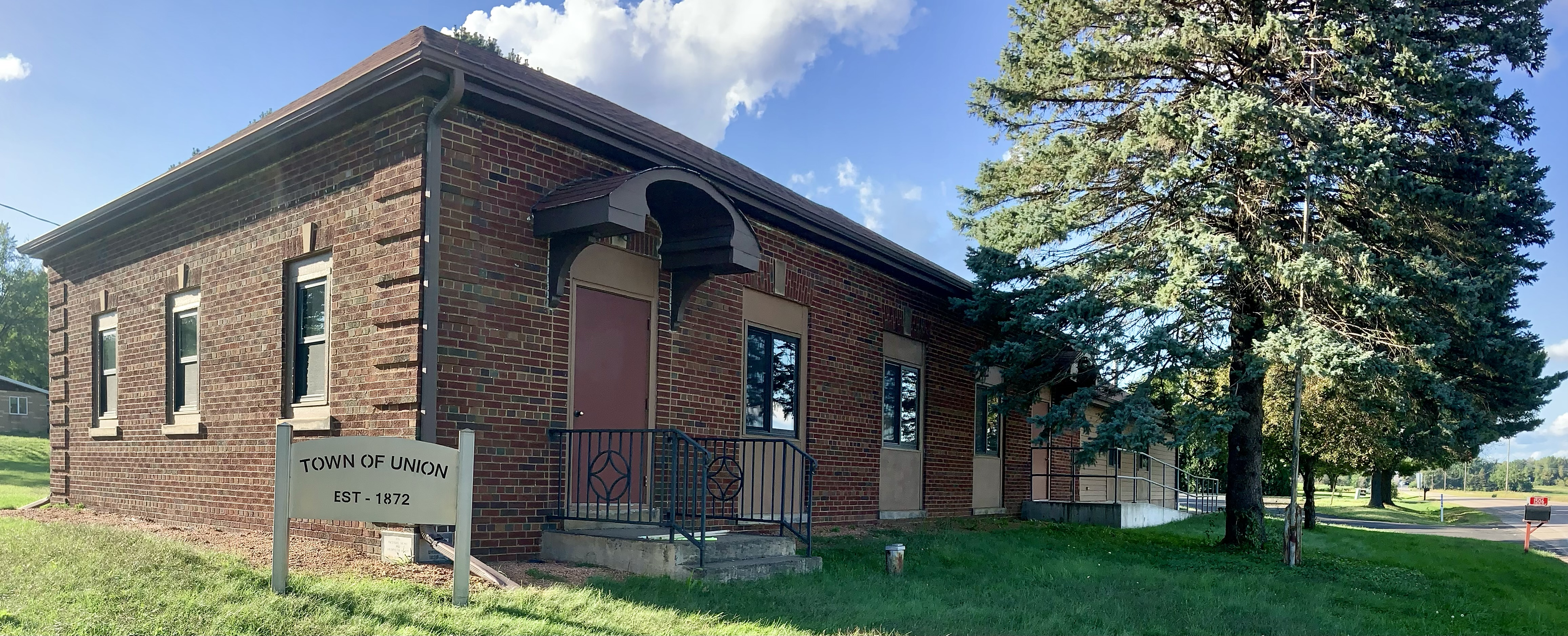
- Town hall

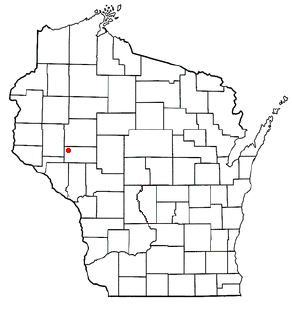
- Location of Union

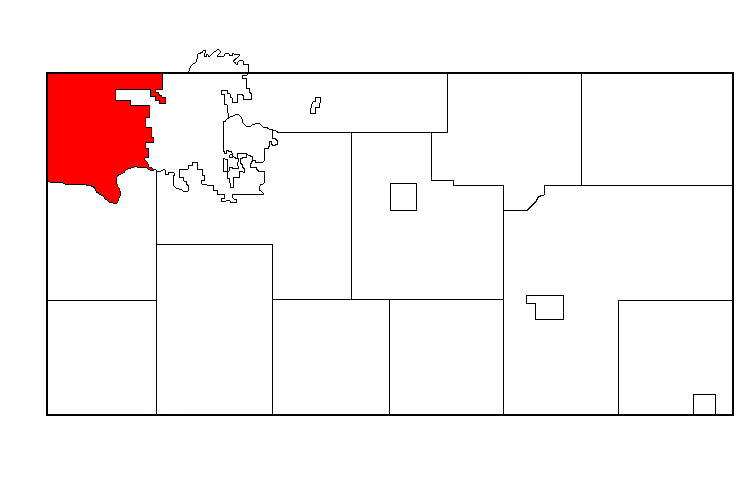
- Location of Union within Eau Claire County
- Coordinates: 44°48′45″N 91°36′04″W
- Country: United States
- State: Wisconsin
- County: Eau Claire

Area
  - Total: 28.4 sq mi (73.6 km^{2})
  - Land: 28.0 sq mi (72.4 km^{2})
  - Water: 0.46 sq mi (1.2 km^{2})
- Elevation: 971 ft (296 m)

Population (2020)
  - Total: 2,696
  - Density: 96.4/sq mi (37.2/km^{2})
- Time zone: UTC-6 (Central (CST))
  - Summer (DST): UTC-5 (CDT)
- Area codes: 715 & 534
- FIPS code: 55-81550
- GNIS feature ID: 1584311
- Website: https://www.townofunionec.com/

Union is a town in Eau Claire County, Wisconsin, United States. The population was 2,696 at the 2020 census. The unincorporated communities of Truax and Union are located in the town.

== Geography ==
According to the United States Census Bureau, the town has a total area of 28.4 square miles (73.6 km^{2}), of which 27.9 square miles (72.4 km^{2}) is land and 0.5 square mile (1.2 km^{2}) (1.69%) is water.

== Demographics ==
Historical population
Census	Pop.	Note	%±
1990	2,446		—
2000	2,402		−1.8%
2010	2,663		10.9%
2020 (est.)	2,802		5.2%

As of the census of 2000, there were 2,402 people, 856 households, and 678 families residing in the town. The population density was 86.0 people per square mile (33.2/km^{2}). There were 878 housing units at an average density of 31.4 per square mile (12.1/km^{2}). The racial makeup of the town was 95.88% White, 0.04% African American, 0.54% Native American, 3.04% Asian, 0.17% from other races, and 0.33% from two or more races. Hispanic or Latino of any race were 0.42% of the population.

There were 856 households, out of which 33.6% had children under the age of 18 living with them, 70.2% were married couples living together, 6.0% had a female householder with no husband present, and 20.7% were non-families. 14.4% of all households were made up of individuals, and 4.7% had someone living alone who was 65 years of age or older. The average household size was 2.79 and the average family size was 3.08.

The population was 26.1% under the age of 18, 7.7% from 18 to 24, 28.9% from 25 to 44, 26.4% from 45 to 64, and 10.9% who were 65 years of age or older. The median age was 38 years. For every 100 females, there were 103.9 males. For every 100 females age 18 and over, there were 104.5 males.

The median income for a household in the town was $52,333, and the median income for a family was $55,921. Males had a median income of $31,750 versus $25,588 for females. The per capita income for the town was $20,518. About 5.0% of families and 5.4% of the population were below the poverty line, including 2.9% of those under age 18 and 11.3% of those age 65 or over.

== Notable people ==
- William A. Cernahan, Wisconsin State Representative and farmer, was born in the town
