= Brunswick, Wisconsin =

Town of Brunswick, Wisconsin
- Town
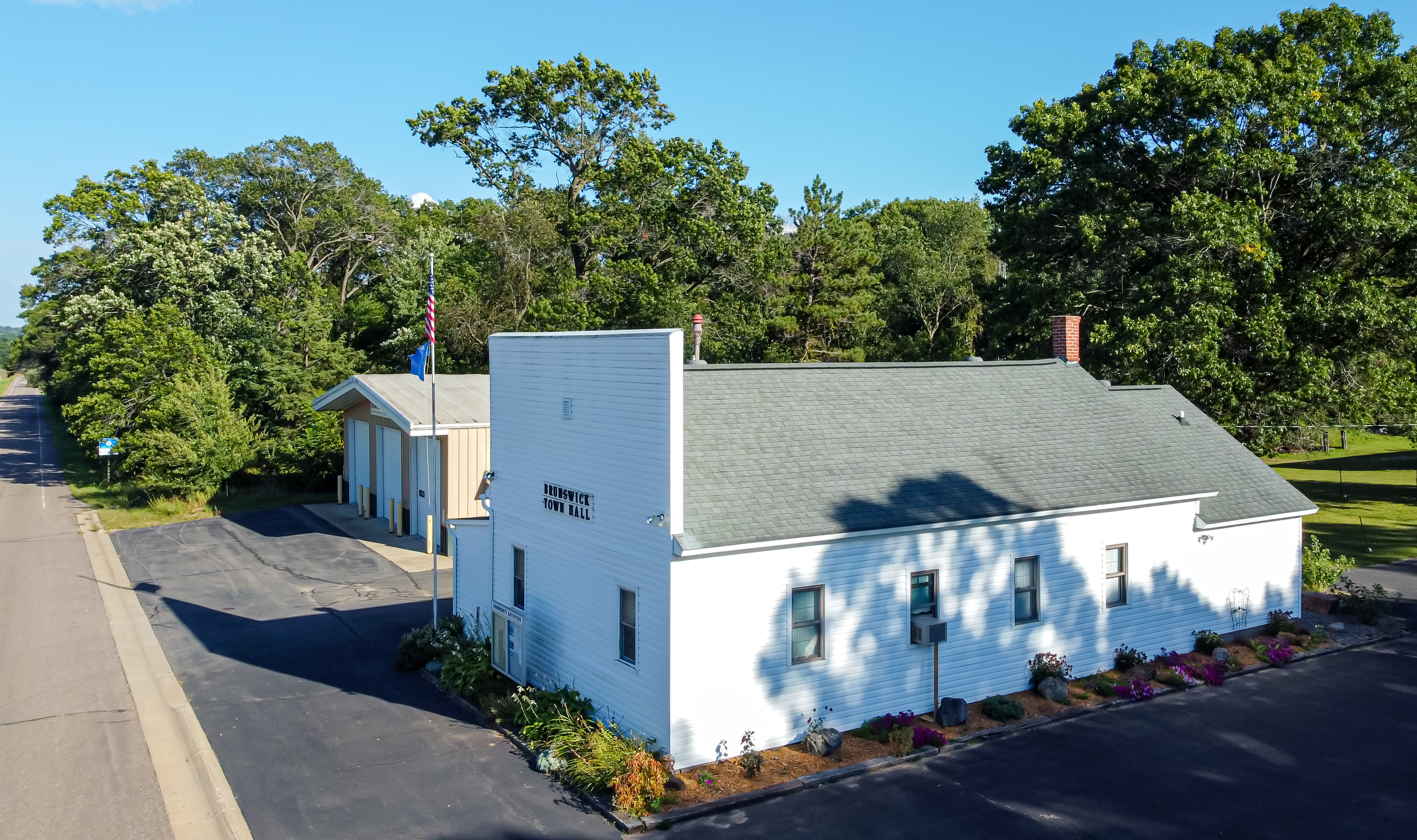
- Town hall

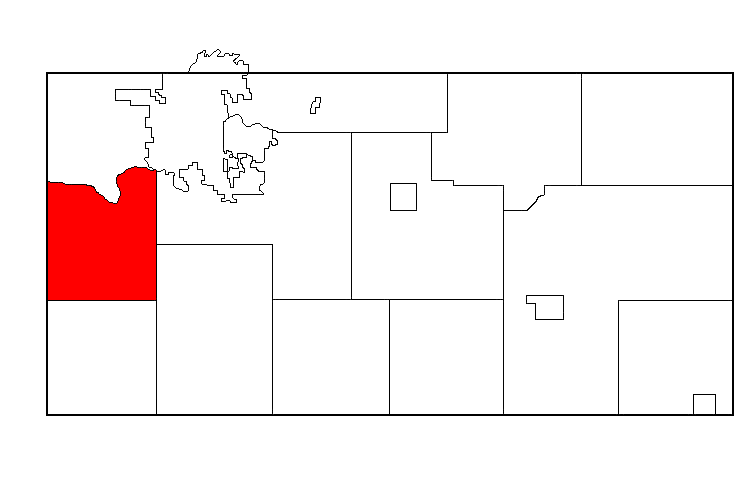
- Location of the Town of Brunswick within Eau Claire County

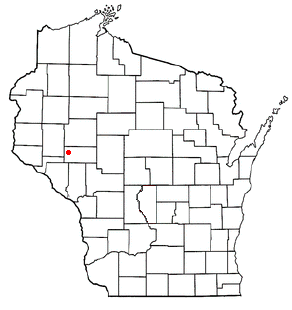
- Location of Brunswick
- Coordinates: 44°43′59″N 91°34′43″W
- Country: United States
- State: Wisconsin
- County: Eau Claire

Area
  - Total: 37.4 sq mi (96.8 km^{2})
  - Land: 36.6 sq mi (94.7 km^{2})
  - Water: 0.77 sq mi (2.0 km^{2})
- Elevation: 883 ft (269 m)

Population (2020)
  - Total: 1,958
  - Density: 53.6/sq mi (20.7/km^{2})
- Time zone: UTC-6 (Central (CST))
  - Summer (DST): UTC-5 (CDT)
- Area codes: 715 & 534
- FIPS code: 55-10625
- GNIS feature ID: 1581144
- Website: https://townofbrunswickwi.gov/

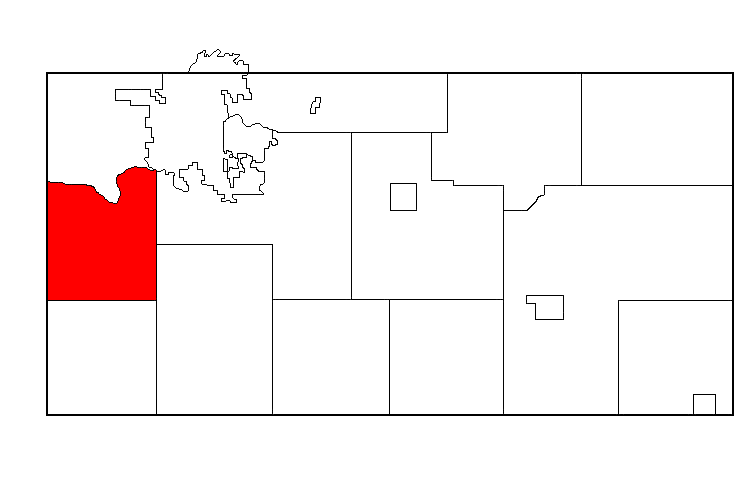
Location of the Town of Brunswick within Eau Claire County

Brunswick is a town in Eau Claire County, Wisconsin, United States. The population was 1,958 at the 2020 census. The unincorporated communities of Lufkin and Mount Hope Corners are located in the town.

== Geography ==
According to the United States Census Bureau, the town has a total area of 37.4 square miles (97 km^{2}), of which 36.6 square miles (95 km^{2}) is land and 0.8 square miles (2.1 km^{2}), or 2.09%, is water.

== Demographics ==
Historical population
Census	Pop.	Note	%±
1970	1,251		—
1980	1,376		10.0%
1990	1,506		9.4%
2000	1,598		6.1%
2010	1,624		1.6%
2020	1,958		20.6%

As of the census of 2000, there were 1,598 people, 630 households, and 490 families residing in the town. The population density was 43.7 people per square mile (16.9/km^{2}). There were 652 housing units at an average density of 17.8 per square mile (6.9/km^{2}). The racial makeup of the town was 98.56% White, 0.06% African American, 0.19% Native American, 0.13% Asian, 0.50% from other races, and 0.56% from two or more races. Hispanic or Latino of any race were 0.94% of the population.

There were 630 households, out of which 31.6% had children under the age of 18 living with them, 67.6% were married couples living together, 6.0% had a female householder with no husband present, and 22.2% were non-families. 17.3% of all households were made up of individuals, and 6.8% had someone living alone who was 65 years of age or older. The average household size was 2.54 and the average family size was 2.85.

The population was 23.0% under the age of 18, 7.3% from 18 to 24, 28.7% from 25 to 44, 28.9% from 45 to 64, and 12.1% who were 65 years of age or older. The median age was 41 years. For every 100 females, there were 104.1 males. For every 100 females age 18 and over, there were 102.5 males.

The median income for a household in the town was $46,458, and the median income for a family was $55,208. Males had a median income of $35,750 versus $23,289 for females. The per capita income for the town was $21,774. About 2.9% of families and 4.0% of the population were below the poverty line, including 2.4% of those under age 18 and 3.7% of those age 65 or over.
