= Eau Claire–Chippewa Falls metropolitan area =

Metropolitan area in Wisconsin

Coordinates: 44°55′N 91°25′W

Eau Claire Metropolitan Area Eau Claire, WI MSA
- Metropolitan Statistical Area
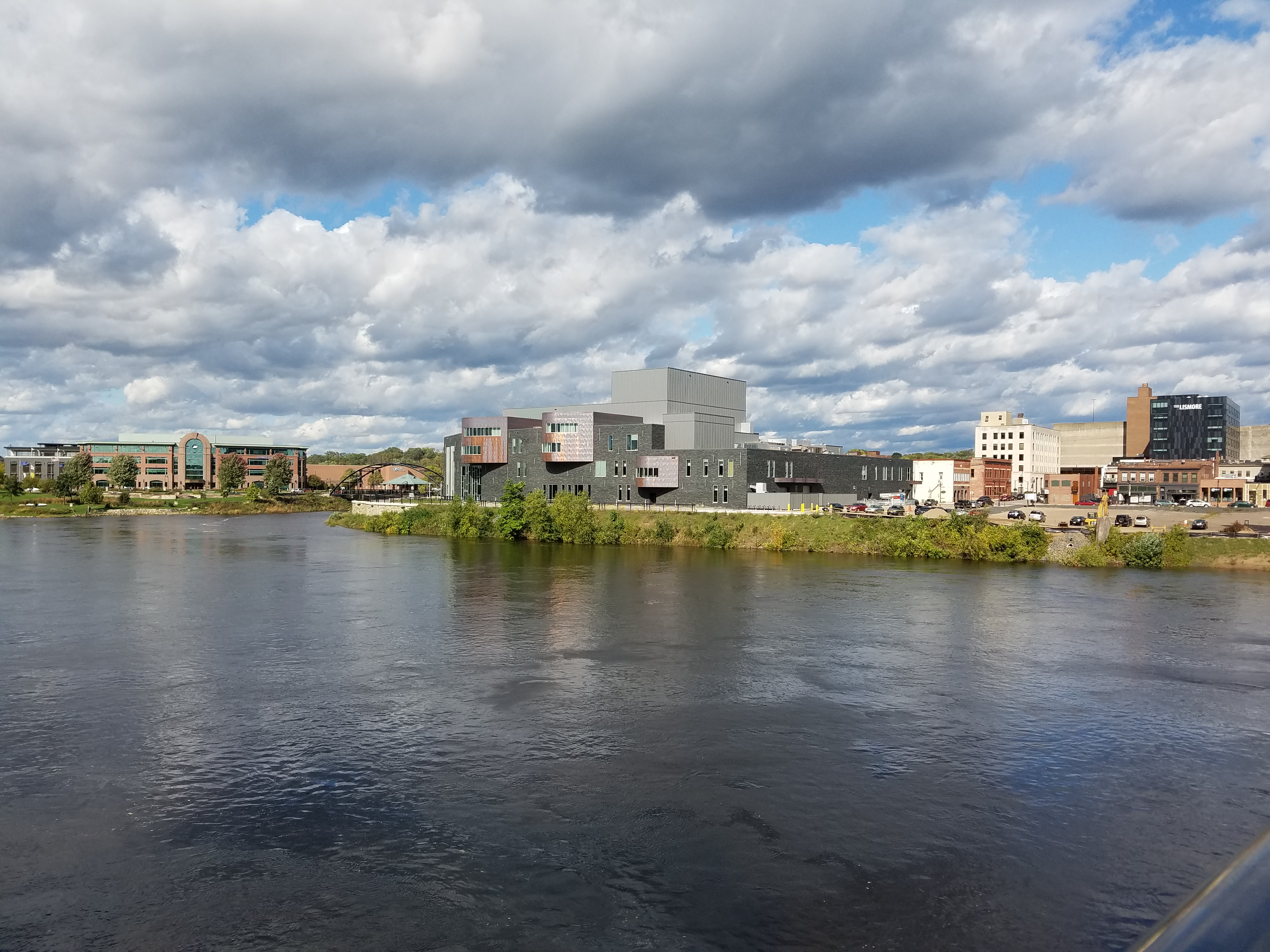
- Downtown Eau Claire
Map of Eau Claire–Menomonie, WI CSA
Eau Claire, WI MSA
Menomonie, WI µSA
City of Eau Claire
- Country: United States
- State: Wisconsin
- Principal cities: Eau Claire; Chippewa Falls; Menomonie
- Time zone: UTC−6 (CST)
  - Summer (DST): UTC−5 (CDT)

The Eau Claire metropolitan area refers loosely to the urbanized area along the Chippewa and Eau Claire Rivers, in west-central Wisconsin, with its primary center at Eau Claire and secondary centers at Chippewa Falls and Altoona.

At a ribbon-cutting for the opening of the final stretch of the newly 4-laned section of WIS 29 between Green Bay and Elk Mound, in 2005, Gov. Jim Doyle referred to the region, including Menomonie to the west, as "Wisconsin's Golden Triangle."

== Extent ==
Because the United States Census Bureau uses only counties to define census statistical areas outside New England, the official Eau Claire Metropolitan Statistical Area (which includes Chippewa Falls) encompasses all of Eau Claire and Chippewa Counties. These counties, combined with Dunn County to the west, coextensive with the Menomonie micropolitan area, comprise the Eau Claire-Menomonie Combined Statistical Area, with a 2015 population of 210,133. These three counties, especially the cities of Chippewa Falls, Eau Claire and Menomonie comprise the economic and cultural core of west-central Wisconsin's Chippewa Valley region.

For practical purposes, the Eau Claire–Chippewa Falls metropolitan area extends only as far as those municipalities directly adjacent to the incorporated cities and villages in the core area, with the notable exception of the Eau Claire County town of Pleasant Valley, which is included because so much of its population is suburban rather than rural. (The Town of Pleasant Valley was one of Wisconsin's fastest-growing political divisions in the 1990s, posting a population increase of over 28%.) The Chippewa County town of Anson is also included due to its proximity to Chippewa Falls. This is the definition used by the Chippewa-Eau Claire Metropolitan Planning Organization. According to the 2015 census estimates, this core area had a 2015 population of 129,665. This population comprises 78.3% of the Eau Claire-Chippewa County area, and 61.7% of the Eau Claire-Chippewa-Dunn County area.

== Transportation ==
=== Airports ===
The Eau Claire–Chippewa Falls metropolitan area is served by the Chippewa Valley Regional Airport. As well as by the Menomonie Municipal Airport and several smaller private airports.

Regular shuttle service is also available to Minneapolis–Saint Paul International Airport, the closest international airport, approximately 85 miles (137 km) distant.

=== Waterways ===
Although the Chippewa River once served as an important transit route for the area, river transit is no longer feasible from the Mississippi River. Hydroelectric dams within the metropolitan area, one in Eau Claire and two in Chippewa Falls, further limit its ability to be used as a transit route. The rather shallow Eau Claire River is dammed at Altoona (as well as 20 miles further upstream at Lake Eau Claire). The rivers, as well as the reservoirs formed by the dams, are used today principally for recreation.

=== Highways ===
Many of the primary roadways serving western Wisconsin run through the metropolitan area. Among these are:

Interstate 94
U.S. Route 12
U.S. Route 53
Highway 29
Highway 37
Highway 85
Highway 93
Highway 124
Highway 178
Highway 312

=== Railways ===
Freight rail traffic to and from the Eau Claire–Chippewa Falls metropolitan area is via lines formerly run by the inheritors of both the SOO and Chicago & North Western Railways. The rail network in the metropolitan area was much more extensive until the late 1980s and early 1990s, when many lines were first abandoned and then slowly converted to a network of biking and recreation trails , including the Chippewa River State Trail, which follows much of the old route of the Milwaukee Road railbed, from downtown Eau Claire to Durand.

=== Mass transit ===
The only local mass transit serving the metropolitan area is the Eau Claire Transit bus system, which has service only within the cities of Eau Claire and Altoona.

FlixBus, Greyhound, Megabus and Wisconsin Coach Lines have multiple bus stops throughout the Eau Claire MSA including the Eau Claire Transit Center (Downtown Eau Claire) and Chippewa Falls Holiday Gas Station (2750 120th St.) The ticketing depot is near the junction of I-94, US-12 and Wis. 312 in a McDonald's (6251 Truax Ln.) About a dozen other regional tourism and transportation buslines serve the greater Chippewa Valley region.

Amtrak service is only available by travelling to the Twin Cities, La Crosse or Tomah, although in the past several years there has been discussion of making a new Amtrak line that would serve the area directly.

== Included municipalities ==
=== Cities ===
- Altoona
- Chippewa Falls
- Eau Claire

=== Village ===
- Lake Hallie

=== CDPs ===
- Jim Falls
- Lake Wissota
- Seymour

=== Towns ===
- Anson
- Brunswick
- Eagle Point
- Hallie
- Lafayette
- Pleasant Valley
- Seymour
- Tilden
- Union
- Washington
- Wheaton
