= Wisconsin Highway 178 =

State highway in Wisconsin, United States

State Trunk Highway 178
- WIS 178 highlighted in red

Route information
- Maintained by WisDOT
- Length: 23.3 mi (37.5 km)
- Existed: 1947–present

Major junctions
- South end: WIS 29 on Lake Hallie–Chippewa Falls line
- North end: WIS 64 in Cornell

Location
- Country: United States
- State: Wisconsin
- Counties: Chippewa

Highway system
- Wisconsin State Trunk Highway System; Interstate; US; State; Scenic; Rustic
← WIS 177	→ WIS 179

State Trunk Highway 178 (often called Highway 178, STH-178 or WIS 178) is a 23.3-mile (37.5 km) state highway in Chippewa County, Wisconsin, United States, that runs north–south roughly along the Chippewa River from Chippewa Falls to Cornell.

== Route description ==
From Lake Hallie to Cornell, WIS 178 entirely follows the west bank of the river.

WIS 178 begins at a WIS 29/WIS 29 Bus. at a diamond interchange. It begins as a four-lane divided roadway. It then curves north in the shape of a hook. It then meanders northward. After intersecting CTH-S at the city limit, WIS 178 downgrades into a two-lane undivided roadway. It still continues to meander northward. Eventually, WIS 178 ends at WIS 64 in Cornell.

== History ==
Before the creation of WIS 178, CTH-I used to follow most of present-day WIS 178. In 1947, WIS 178 was formed. WIS 178 previously began in Chippewa Falls at WIS 124. In 2006 it was rerouted east of the city along Seymour Cray Sr. Boulevard to WIS 29.

== Major intersections ==
The entire route is in Chippewa County.

Location	mi	km	Destinations	Notes
Lake Hallie–Chippewa Falls line	0.00	0.00	WIS 29 – Lake Wissota, Cadott, Wausau, Green Bay, I-94, Menomonie Bus. WIS 29 west – Town of Wheaton, WIS 29	Roadway continues as Bus. WIS 29 beyond southern terminus; diamond interchange
Cornell	30.42	48.96	WIS 64 (South Riverside Drive) – Gilman, Medford, Merrill, Bloomer	Northern terminus; Y intersection
1.000 mi = 1.609 km; 1.000 km = 0.621 mi
