= Wisconsin Highway 124 =

State highway in Wisconsin

State Trunk Highway 124
- WIS 124 highlighted in red

Route information
- Maintained by WisDOT
- Length: 17.59 mi (28.31 km)

Major junctions
- South end: US 53 / CTH-OO in Lake Hallie
- North end: WIS 64 in Eagleton

Location
- Country: United States
- State: Wisconsin
- Counties: Chippewa

Highway system
- Wisconsin State Trunk Highway System; Interstate; US; State; Scenic; Rustic
| ← WIS 123 | → WIS 125 |

State Trunk Highway 124 (often called Highway 124, STH-124 or WIS 124) is a state highway in the US state of Wisconsin. It runs in north–south in west central Wisconsin from Lake Hallie to near Eagleton, in the Town of Eagle Point. The entire length of the highway is in Chippewa County. It previously extended into Eau Claire County, but the Eau Claire County section was renumbered WIS 312 as part of the US Highway 53 (US 53) bypass project in 2006.

== Route description ==
Starting at US 53/CTH-OO at a parclo, WIS 124, as well as Business US 53 (Bus. US 53), begins traveling northwest. It then turns northeast as Bus. US 53 turns southwest. After that, it cuts through under the US 53/WIS 29 cloverleaf interchange. In Chippewa Falls, it begins to run concurrently with Bus. WIS 29 all the way to downtown. After crossing the Chippewa River, Bus. WIS 29 branches westward, ending the concurrency. Furthermore, WIS 124 becomes a one-way pair only through downtown. After leaving Chippewa Falls, it continues to travel northward through Eagle Point and Eagleton. Eventually, it intersects WIS 64 and ends.

== Major intersections ==
The entire highway is in Chippewa County.

| Location | mi | km | Destinations | Notes |
|---|---|---|---|---|
| Lake Hallie | 0.00 | 0.00 | US 53 / CTH-OO east to WIS 29 – Eau Claire, Rice Lake, Superior Bus. US 53 ends / Alt. US 53 begins | Southern end of Bus. US 53/Alt. US 53/CTH-OO concurrency |
| Lake Hallie | | | Bus. US 53 south / CTH-OO west | Northern end of Bus. US 53/CTH-OO concurrency |
| Chippewa Falls | | | Bus. WIS 29 east to WIS 29 – Cadott | Roundabout; southern end of Bus. WIS 29 concurrency |
| Chippewa Falls | | | Park Street | Southbound exit and northbound entrance only; interchange |
| Chippewa Falls | | | Bus. WIS 29 west / Alt. US 53 north to US 53 / Bridge Street | Northern end of Alt. US 53/Bus. WIS 29 concurrency; roundabout |
| Eagle Point–Bloomer town line | 17.59 | 28.31 | WIS 64 – Bloomer, Cornell | |
1.000 mi = 1.609 km; 1.000 km = 0.621 mi: Concurrency terminus; Incomplete access
