= Cadwallader Jackson Wiltse =

American politician

Cadwallader Jackson Wiltse (May 29, 1823 – June 21, 1900) was a member of the Wisconsin State Assembly.

== Biography ==
Wiltse was born on May 29, 1823, in Clarence, New York. He settled on a farm in Mukwonago, Wisconsin in 1850 and on another farm in Lafayette, Chippewa County, Wisconsin in 1862. Wiltse later moved to Chippewa Falls, Wisconsin in 1868 and to Cadott, Wisconsin in 1889, where he died on June 21, 1900. He was a Baptist.

== Political career ==
Wiltse was a member of the Assembly during the 1876 session. Other positions he held include Superintendent of Schools of Mukwonago, Town Clerk and Chairman of the town board (similar to city council) of Lafayette, City Attorney of Chippewa Falls, District Attorney and County Judge of Chippewa County, Wisconsin and justice of the peace. He was a Democrat.
