= World War I Veterans Memorial Highway =

The World War I Veterans Memorial Highway may refer to:

- Wisconsin Highway 29
- U.S. Route 395 in Oregon
