= Bateman, Wisconsin =

- Unincorporated community
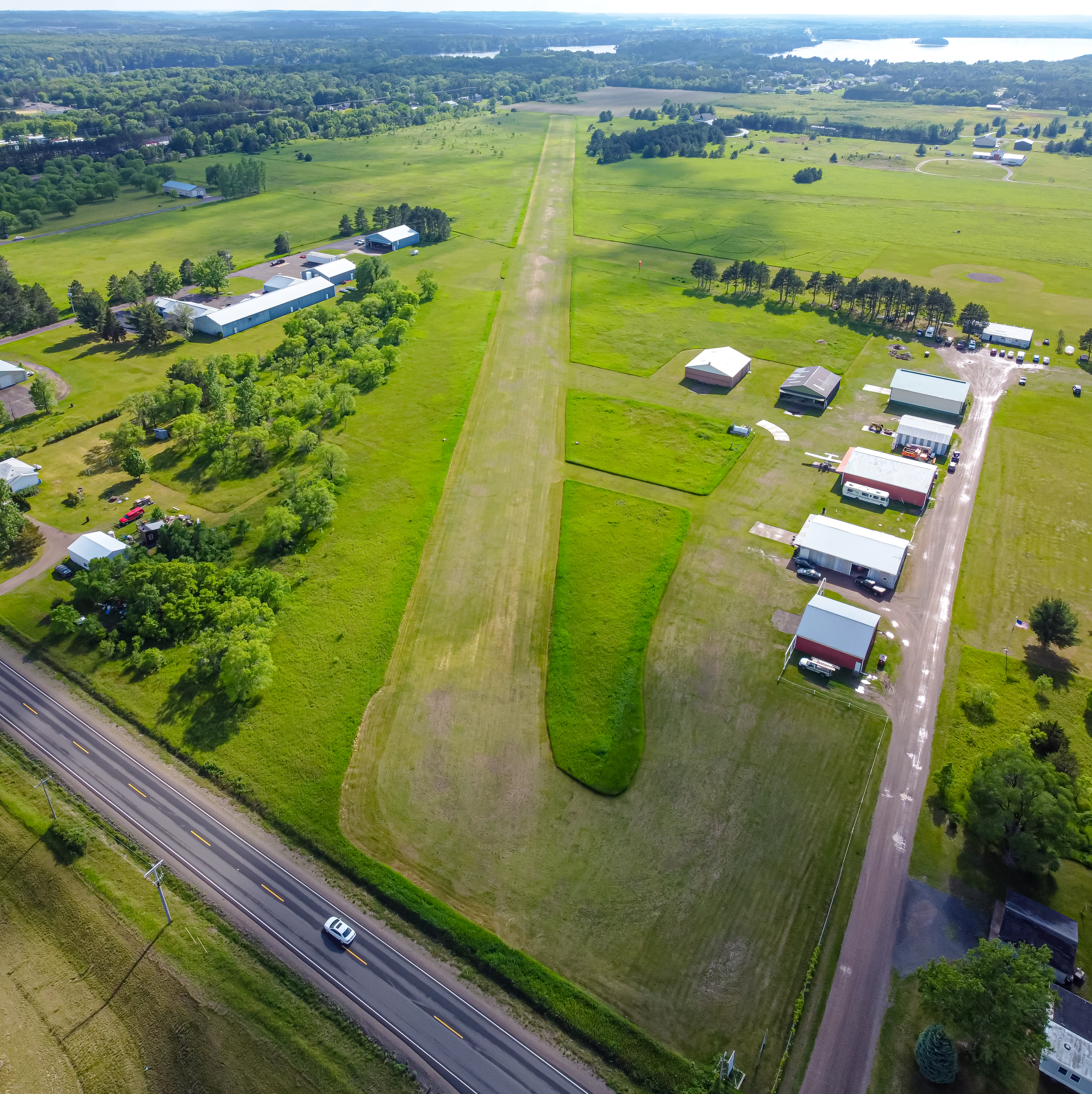
- skydiving airport in Bateman

- Location within Wisconsin Location within the United States
- Coordinates: 44°55′52″N 91°16′05″W
- Country: United States
- State: Wisconsin
- County: Chippewa
- Town: Lafayette
- Elevation: 938 ft (286 m)
- Time zone: UTC-6 (Central (CST))
  - Summer (DST): UTC-5 (CDT)
- Area codes: 715 & 534
- GNIS feature ID: 1561301

Bateman is an unincorporated community located in the town of Lafayette, Chippewa County, Wisconsin, United States. The community was named for Mathew P. Bateman, the site's owner, who emigrated from Ireland in the early 1850s. His son, Alicon, was the first postmaster in 1883.
