= Pilsen (community), Wisconsin =

Pilsen, Wisconsin
- Unincorporated community
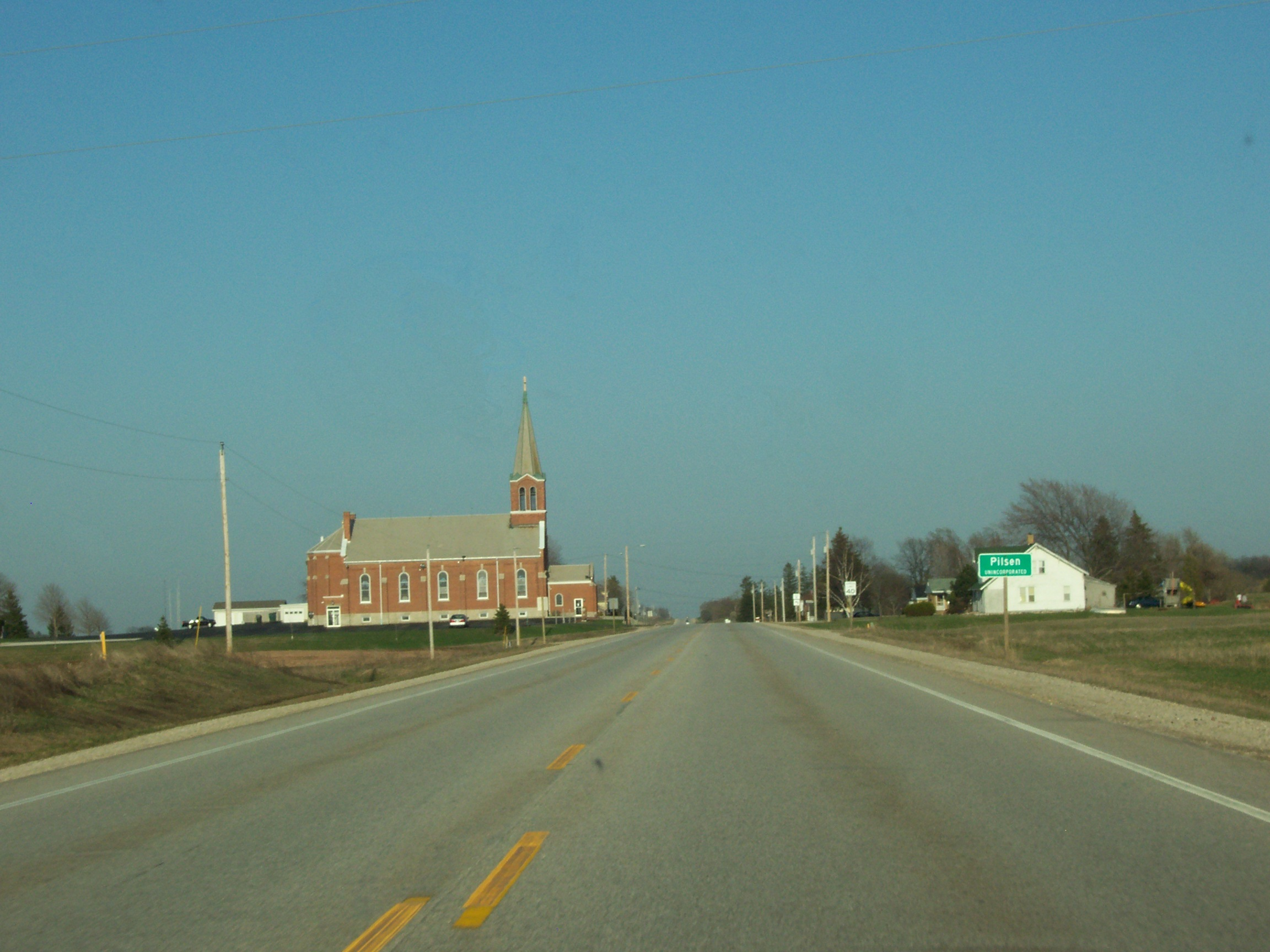
- Looking east at Pilsen

- Location within Wisconsin Location within the United States
- Coordinates: 44°26′37″N 87°43′30″W
- Country: United States
- State: Wisconsin
- County: Kewaunee
- Town: Montpelier
- Elevation: 883 ft (269 m)
- Time zone: UTC-6 (Central (CST))
  - Summer (DST): UTC-5 (CDT)
- Area code: 920
- GNIS feature ID: 1571412

Pilsen is an unincorporated community in the town of Montpelier, in Kewaunee County, Wisconsin, United States. It is located on Wisconsin Highway 29.
