= Business routes of Wisconsin Highway 29 =

State highway in Wisconsin, United States

State Trunk Highway 29

Location
- Country: United States
- State: Wisconsin

Highway system
- Wisconsin State Trunk Highway System; Interstate; US; State; Scenic; Rustic

A total of four business routes of Wisconsin Highway 29 exist. None of these business routes are official state highways according to the Wisconsin Department of Transportation (WisDOT) and are thus locally maintained.

== Chippewa Falls ==
Business State Trunk Highway 29
- Location: Chippewa Falls
- Existed: August 2005–present

Business Highway 29 in Chippewa Falls follows the former alignment of WIS 29 which existed prior to the opening of the new freeway that bypasses the city to the south. The highway is concurrent with County Highway X from its western terminus to US 53 on the west end of Chippewa Falls. It enters Chippewa Falls as River Street before turning onto WIS 124 and heading south. BTH-29 leaves WIS 124 at a roundabout in south Chippewa Falls and continues east to WIS 29.

== Abbotsford ==
Business State Trunk Highway 29
- Location: Abbotsford
- Existed: September 1999–present

Business Highway 29 in Abbotsford follows the former alignment of WIS 29 through the village which existed prior to the opening of the new expressway that bypasses the city to the south. Access to the route is available only for incoming traffic to Abbotsford via either direction, return access to WIS 29 is only available in the directions away from Abbotsford.

== Wittenberg ==
Business State Trunk Highway 29
- Location: Wittenberg
- Existed: July 1999–present

Business Highway 29 in Wittenberg starts at the junction of US 45 and heads south into the village where it turns east onto CTH Q, which is the new designation for the former alignment of WIS 29. Access to the business route is available at three diamond interchanges (one of which only provides a northbound exit and a southbound entrance).

== Shawano ==
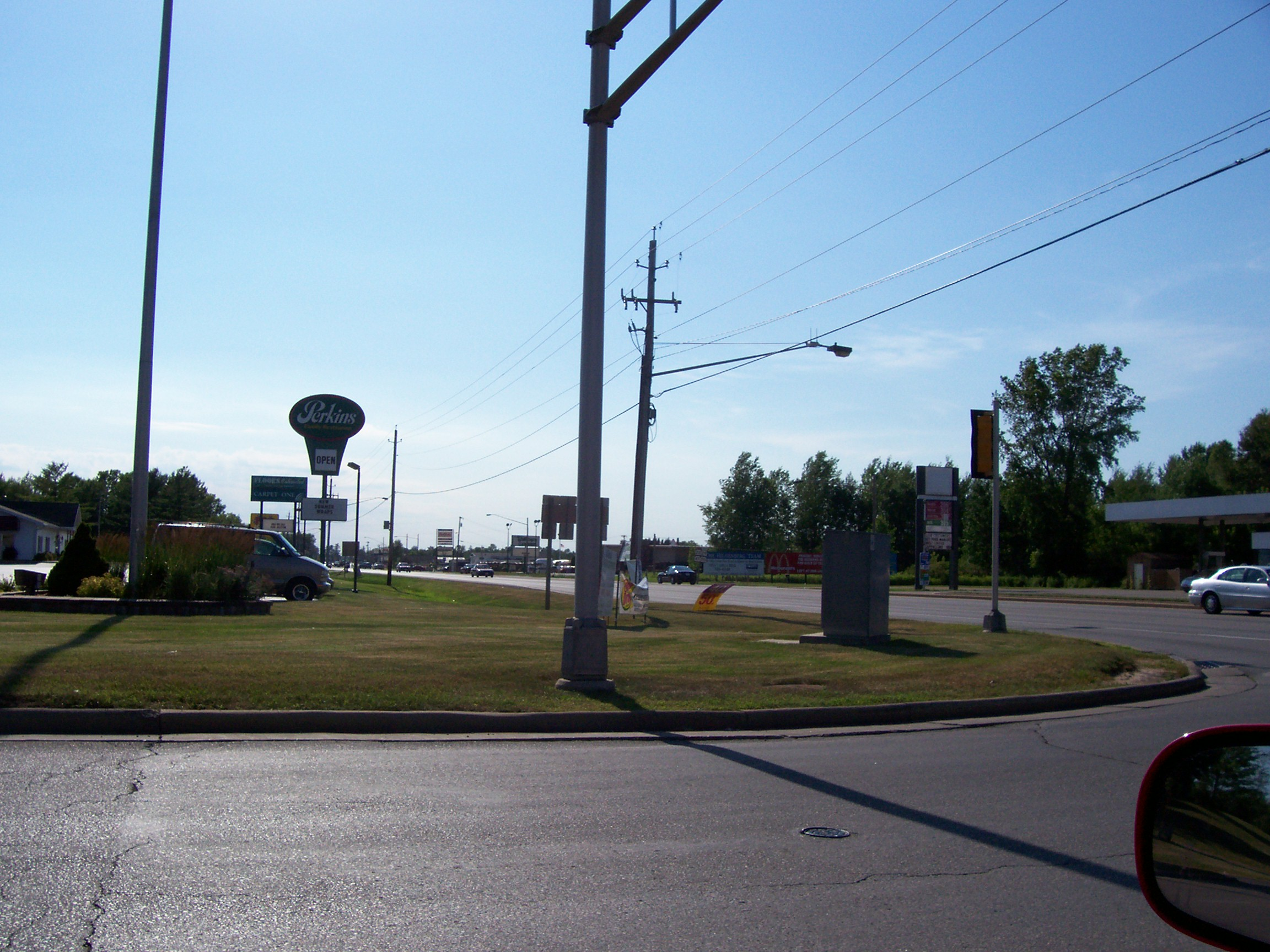

Business State Trunk Highway 29
- Location: Shawano
- Existed: Fall 1998–present

Business Highway 29 in Shawano starts at the junction of CTH MMM and WIS 29 and follows the former alignment of WIS 29 into the city. It turns south along with the new alignment of WIS 47 and WIS 55 along South Airport Drive to return to WIS 29 from the city. Business 29 initially followed WIS 22 north into town instead of CTH MMM.
