= Notre Dame Church and Goldsmith Memorial Chapel =

Historic church in Wisconsin, United States

- U.S. National Register of Historic Places
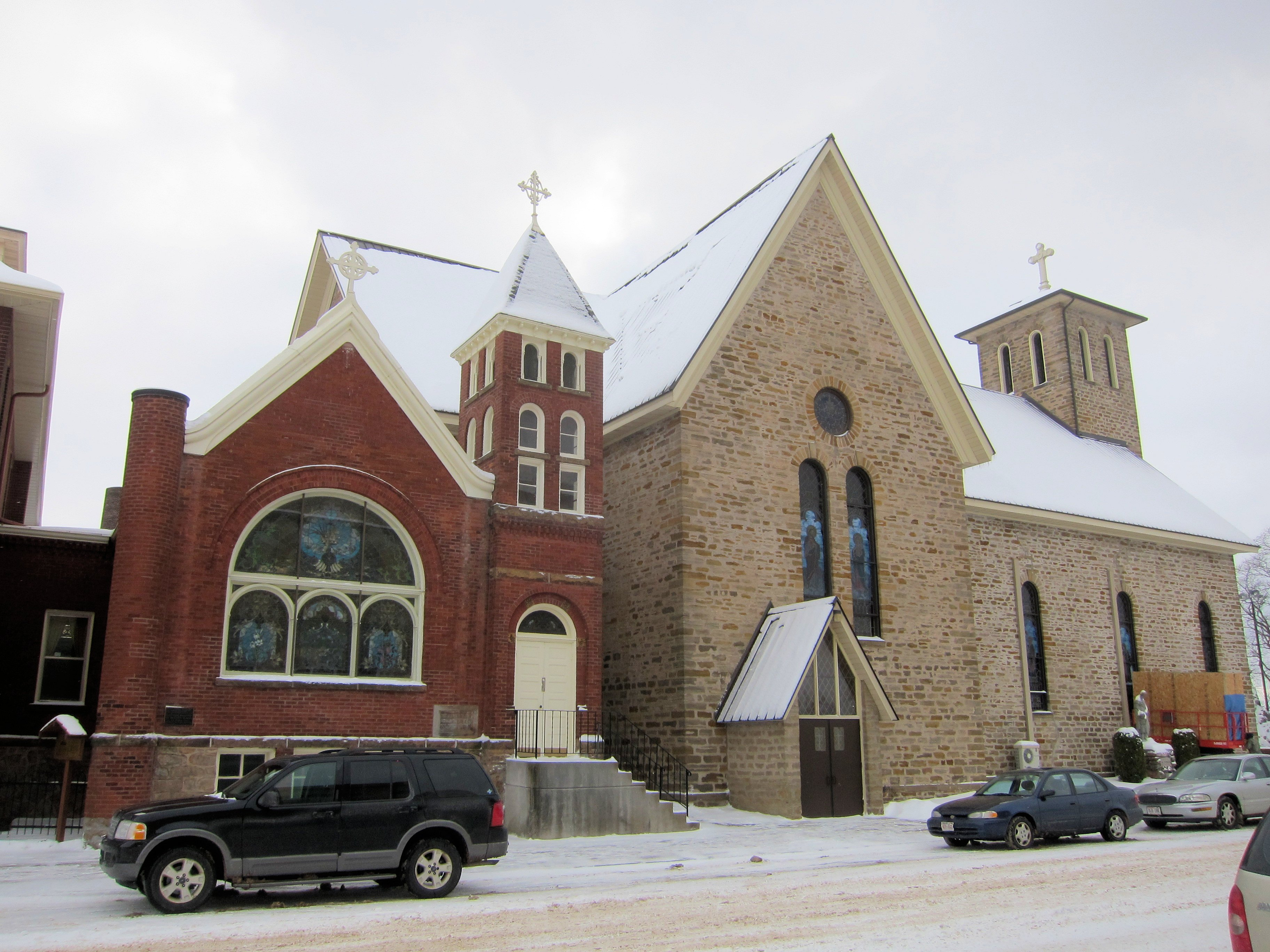

- Location within Wisconsin Location within the United States
- Location: 117 Allen St., Chippewa Falls, Wisconsin
- Coordinates: 44°56′9″N 91°23′12″W
- Area: less than one acre
- Built: 1872
- Built by: Lawler, James
- Architectural style: Romanesque
- MPS: Notre Dame Parish TR
- NRHP reference No.: 83003369
- Added to NRHP: April 7, 1983

Notre Dame Church and Goldsmith Memorial Chapel is a historic church located in Chippewa Falls, Wisconsin. On April 7, 1983, the site was added to the National Register of Historic Places. It is affiliated with the Roman Catholic Diocese of La Crosse.

== History ==
The church was completed in 1872. Goldsmith Memorial Chapel was added in 1894. The church underwent other renovations in 1887 and again from 1904 to 1906.
