= Wisconsin Highway 29 =

Highway in Wisconsin

State Trunk Highway 29
- World War I Veterans Memorial Highway
- WIS 29; mainline in red, business routes in blue

Route information
- Maintained by WisDOT
- Length: 307.35 mi (494.63 km)

Major junctions
- West end: US 10 / WIS 35 in Prescott
- US 63 in Martell; US 12 / WIS 25 in Menomonie; I-94 in Elk Mound; US 12 / WIS 40 in Elk Mound; US 53 in Chippewa Falls; US 51 in Wausau; I-39 / US 51 in Rothschild; US 45 in Wittenberg; I-41 / US 41 / WIS 32 in Howard; US 141 / WIS 54 / WIS 57 in Green Bay
- East end: WIS 42 / LMCT in Kewaunee

Location
- Country: United States
- State: Wisconsin
- Counties: Pierce, St. Croix, Dunn, Chippewa, Clark, Marathon, Shawano, Brown, Kewaunee

Highway system
- Wisconsin State Trunk Highway System; Interstate; US; State; Scenic; Rustic
← WIS 28	→ WIS 30

State Trunk Highway 29 (often called Highway 29, STH-29 or WIS 29) is a state highway running east–west across central Wisconsin. It is a major east–west corridor connecting the Twin Cities and the Chippewa Valley with Wausau and Green Bay. A multi-year project to convert the corridor to a four-lane freeway or expressway from Elk Mound to Green Bay was completed in 2005. The remainder of WIS 29 is two-lane surface road or an urban multi-lane road.

== Route description ==
=== Prescott to Elk Mound ===
WIS 29 begins at its western terminus at U.S. Highway 10 (US 10), on the north side of Prescott. From this point, WIS 29 is concurrent with WIS 35 going northeast to River Falls, passing the University of Wisconsin–River Falls campus. At the junction with WIS 65, WIS 35 turns northbound with WIS 65 while WIS 29 continues east. WIS 29 joins briefly with US 63 west of Spring Valley and turns eastbound upon its split one mile (1.6 km) south to head into Spring Valley. Upon leaving Spring Valley and Pierce County, Wisconsin, the highway heads northwardward into St. Croix County and turns east towards Menomonie. WIS 29 does not pass through any municipalities while in this county, but it does cross WIS 128.

Upon entering Dunn County, the route passes through rural terrain and enters Menomonie's west side as Hudson Road. The highway turns northward onto Main Street and passes west and north of the University of Wisconsin–Stout campus. WIS 29 turns east onto Stout Road along with US 12 and leaves the city to the east. US 12/WIS 29 proceeds east for about nine miles (14 km) and junctions with Interstate 94 (I-94). This interchange is the westernmost point of the multi-lane WIS 29 corridor. It is also the westernmost point of WIS 29 as a backbone route in Corridors 2020.

=== Elk Mound to Wausau ===
West of County Highway T (CTH-T), the highway is an expressway. It passes into the Chippewa Valley metropolitan area and south of Chippewa Falls as a freeway and crosses US 53 at a cloverleaf interchange in Lake Hallie. WIS 29 junctions with the southern terminus of WIS 178 southeast of Chippewa Falls then passes to the south of Lake Wissota State Park before crossing under WIS 27 in Cadott. WIS 29 passes south of Boyd and Stanley before exiting the county to the east.

In Clark County, WIS 29 meets WIS 73 in Thorp. The two highways run concurrently and exit the village to the east, and WIS 73 splits to the south in Withee about 10 miles (16 km) east. WIS 29 continues east and passes south of Owen and Curtiss. At Abbotsford, WIS 29 and WIS 13 meet at a partial cloverleaf interchange between Abbotsford and Colby on the Clark–Marathon county line. Twelve miles (19 km) east of Abbotsford, WIS 29 and WIS 97 meet at a diamond interchange. This is a key route for travelers between Wausau and Marshfield. East of this junction, WIS 29 follows a straight course that passes Edgar and meets WIS 107 at a diamond interchange on the north side of Marathon City, approximately eight miles (13 km) west of Wausau. WIS 29 enters Wausau as a freeway, junctions with Stewart Avenue approximately 1/2 mile (0.80 km) west of US 51 at an eastbound off/westbound on style half-interchange. WIS 29 then immediately enters the US 51 interchange, and turns south onto and follows US 51 for five miles (8.0 km), bypassing the downtown area to the south.

=== Wausau to Green Bay ===
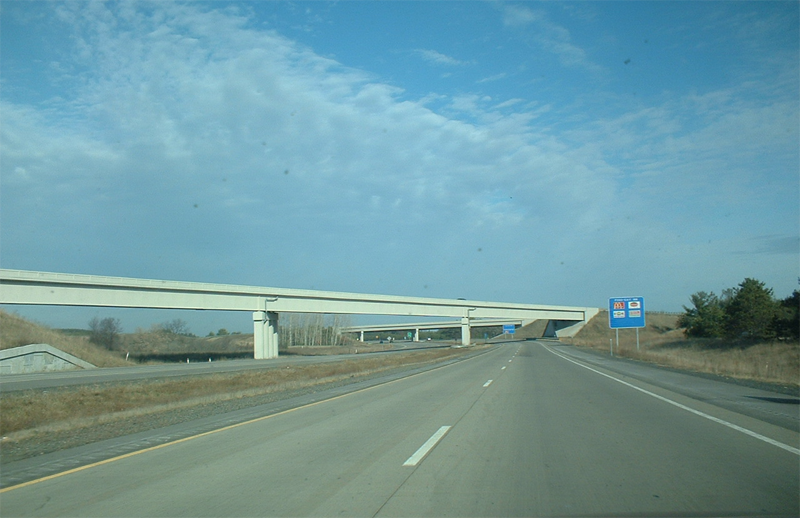
WIS 29 interchange on I-39 and US 51

South of Wausau, WIS 29 turns off US 51 to the east at the northern terminus of I-39 and continues as freeway, passing through the villages of Rothschild and Weston. The freeway section ends at Ringle. As an expressway, the highway passes just south of Hatley and turns southeast for about four miles (6 km) before turning east again at the northern terminus of WIS 49.

The highway enters Shawano County about one mile (1.6 km) east of this junction. WIS 29 passes north and around Wittenberg. US 45 joins with the highway north of Wittenberg and the two routes run concurrently to where US 45 splits to the south at about two miles (3.2 km) east of the village. WIS 29 bypasses Tilleda and Thornton on the way towards Shawano. At Shawano, the expressway becomes a freeway at the junction with CTH-MMM (WIS 29 Business) and turns southeast to bypass Shawano to the south, diamond interchanges link the highway with WIS 22 and WIS 47 north/WIS 55 north as it pass south of the city. WIS 47 south and WIS 55 south follow WIS 29 east. WIS 47 splits to the south at the diamond interchange junction with WIS 117 south of Bonduel. WIS 29 (along with WIS 55) then returns to an expressway at the junction with CTH-BE (WIS 29's former route). WIS 55 splits to the south at the diamond interchange junction with WIS 160 at Angelica and WIS 29 heads southeast to the Brown County line.

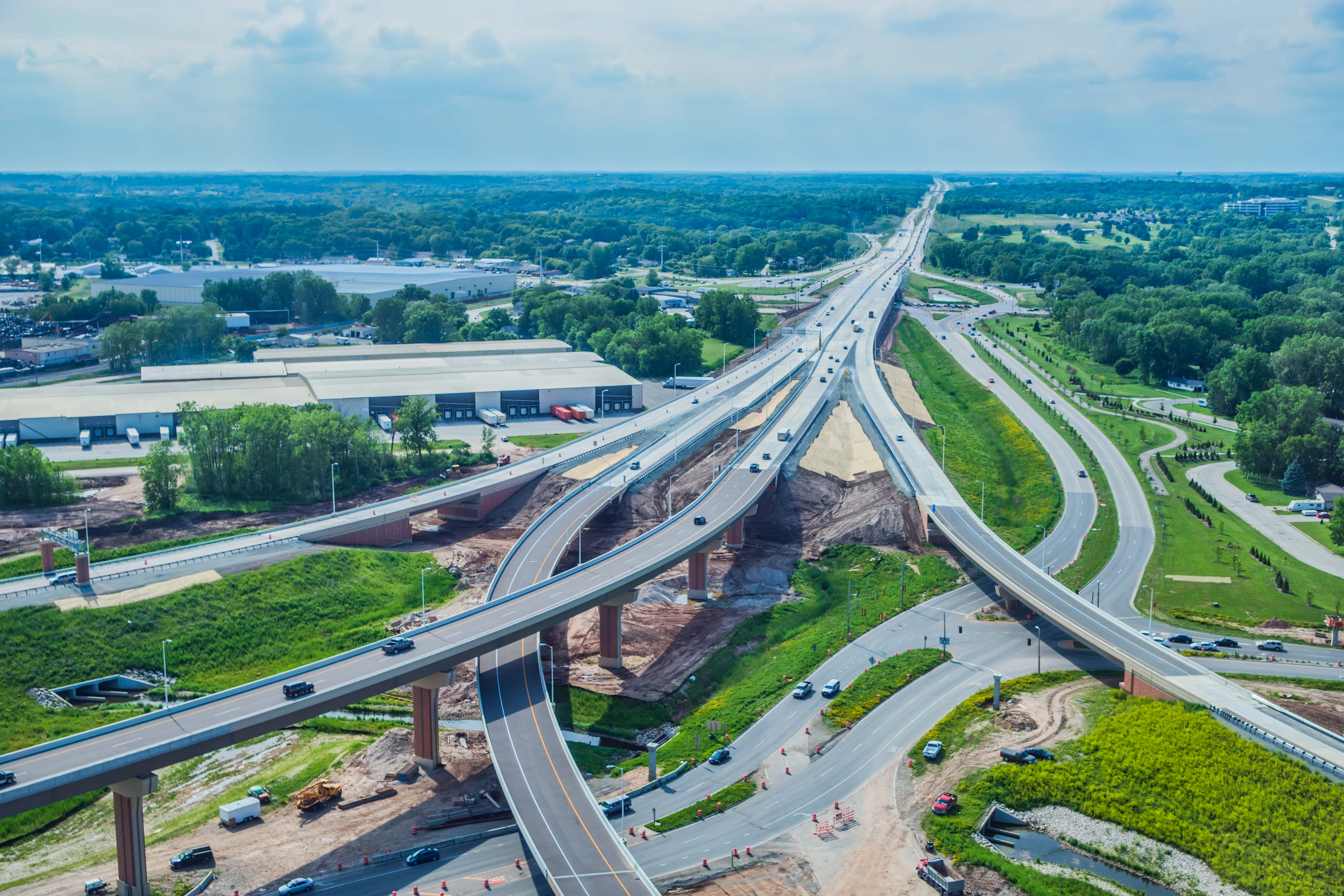
Flyovers completed at WIS 29-US 41 interchange in 2014 as part of the US 41 project

About one mile (1.6 km) into Brown County, WIS 29 collects WIS 32 eastbound at the diamond interchange with WIS 156 and CTH-Y. WIS 29 very briefly passes through the northeast corner of Outagamie County and enters the village of Howard. The multilane expressway and the Backbone Corridor route end at Interstate 41/US 41. WIS 32 turns south onto I-41/US 41 as WIS 29 continues into Green Bay as Shawano Avenue.

=== Green Bay to Kewaunee ===
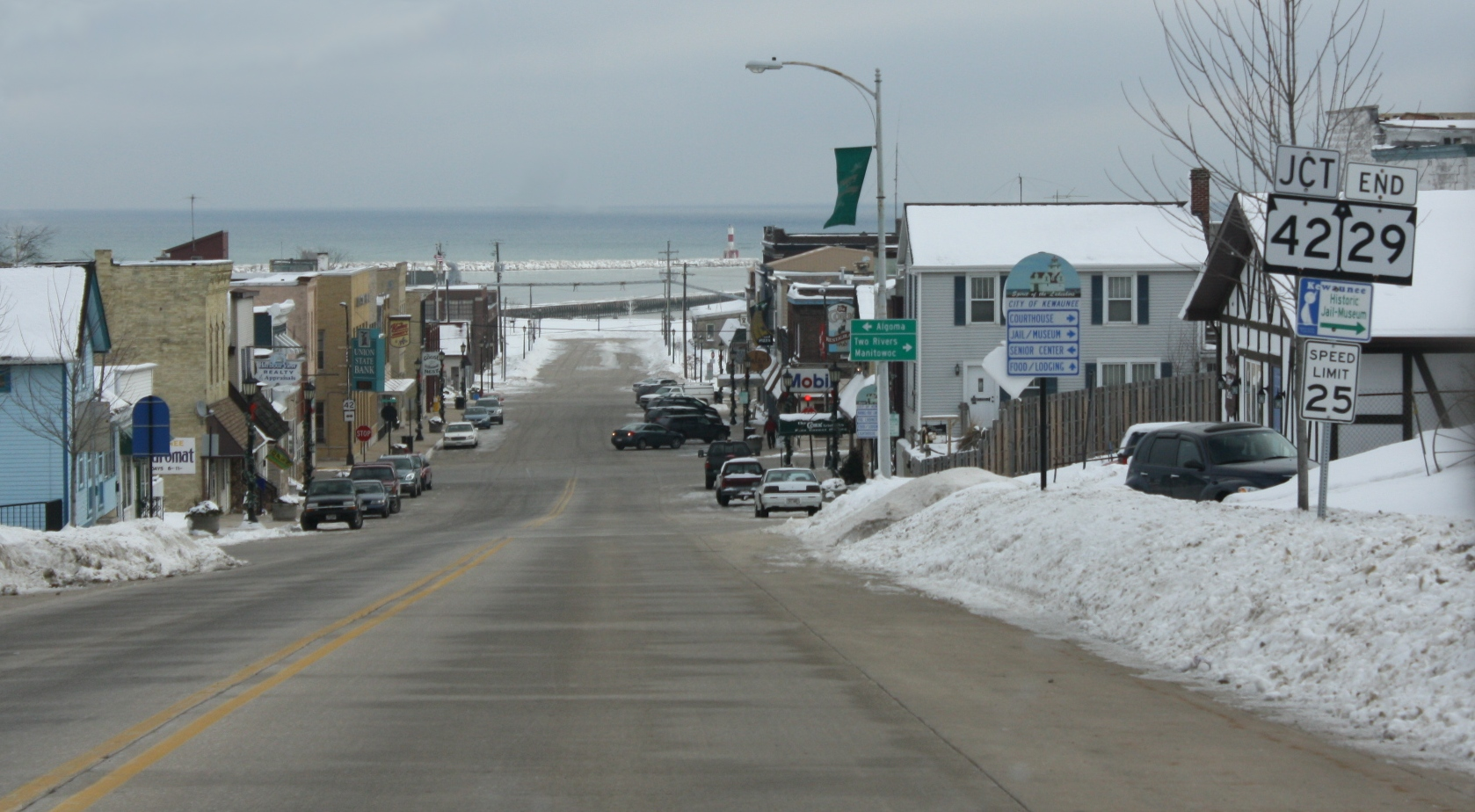
Eastern terminus in Kewaunee

In downtown Green Bay, WIS 29 turns north onto South Monroe Avenue for four blocks, joining with WIS 54 and turns east onto Main Street, splitting from WIS 54 and joining US 141 to leave the city to the southeast. The highways pass over I-43 without an interchange. WIS 29 splits to the east from US 141 at about one mile (1.6 km) north of US 's southern terminus at I-43 in Bellevue. This provides the only access from I-43 to WIS 29. The highway passes through Poland and Henrysville as it exits Brown County to the east. In Kewaunee County, WIS 29 passes due east through Pilsen and north of Krok as a two-lane road. The highway ends in downtown Kewaunee at WIS 42 on the shores of Lake Michigan.

== History ==
Prior to 1926, WIS 29 was numbered WIS 116 from Minnesota to Chippewa Falls, WIS 16 from Chippewa Falls to Bellevue, and WIS 146 from Bellevue to Kewaunee. WIS 16 continued southeast from Bellevue along what became US 141 in 1926 to Manitowoc. What had been WIS 29 before 1926 became US 16 across the state.

WIS 29 has long been known as "Bloody 29" because of the prevalence of grisly fatal traffic crashes along significant portions of the highway. In 1988, a study was commissioned to examine widening the highway to a four-lane divided highway. The changes would be made along 203 miles (327 km) of road from I-94, 2 miles (3.2 km) west of Elk Mound, to US 41 in Howard (suburban Green Bay). The final segment of the highway, connecting the east side of Chippewa Falls with the segment running north of Eau Claire, was opened to traffic on August 16, 2005. Of the total length, about 65 miles (105 km) of the highway meets Interstate Highway standards. Most of the expansion was completed with only minor additions to the already-existing easements, and as a result, the expanded roadway almost exactly matches the highway's original course.

A project expanding WIS 29 and reconfiguring interchanges with US 51 and I-39 in the Wausau area was completed in 2010 at a cost of $309 million. Based on the high cost and limited benefits, this project was included in WisPIRGs list of highway boondoggles.

The portion of WIS 29 between Chippewa Falls and Abbotsford roughly follows what used to be the Yellowstone Trail.

Before 2025 WIS 29 had a junction with WIS 52 on Stewart Avenue, however WIS 52 now runs on Bridge Street avoiding WIS 29.

In the 2020s, the WIS 29 corridor from Green Bay to Eau Claire was designated as an Alternative Fuel Corridor for electric vehicles.

== Future ==
Long range plans call for WIS 29 to be converted to a full freeway between I-94 in Elk Mound and I-41 in Green Bay, however, there is no timetable for the entire corridor to be completed.

== Major intersections ==
County	Location	mi	km	Exit	Destinations	Notes
Pierce	Prescott	0.00	0.00		US 10 / WIS 35 south / Alt. I-94 east – Prescott, Ellsworth	Western end of WIS 35 and Alternate I-94 concurency
Pierce	River Falls	12.75	20.52		WIS 35 north / WIS 65 – Ellsworth, Hudson, Roberts	Eastern end of WIS 35 concurrency
Pierce	Martell	24.37	39.22		US 63 – Baldwin, Ellsworth	
St. Croix	Spring Valley	35.45	57.05		WIS 128 – Glenwood City, Elmwood	
Dunn	Menomonie	50.02	80.50		US 12 west / WIS 25 – Durand, Wheeler, Baldwin	Western end of US 12 concurrency
Dunn	Elk Mound	59.97	96.51	60	I-94 – Madison, St. Paul	Western end of four-lane expressway; signed as exits 60A and 60B
Dunn	Elk Mound	60.86	97.94	61	US 12 east / WIS 40 north – Colfax, Elk Mound	Eastern end of US 12 concurrency
Chippewa	Chippewa Falls	69.55	111.93	69	CTH-T	
Chippewa	Chippewa Falls	72.50	116.68	72	Bus. WIS 29 (90th Avenue)	
Chippewa	Chippewa Falls	75.95	122.23	75	US 53 / Alt. I-94 west – Eau Claire, Superior	Signed as exits 75A (US 53 south) and 75B (US 53 north), Eastern end of Alternate I-94 concurrency
Chippewa	Chippewa Falls	79.50	127.94	79	Bus. WIS 29 / WIS 178 north – Chippewa Falls	
Chippewa	Lake Wissota	80.87	130.15	80	CTH-X – Lake Wissota State Park	Westbound entrance and eastbound exit only
Chippewa	Lake Wissota	81.58	131.29	81	CTH-J – Lake Wissota	
Chippewa	Lake Wissota	87.67	141.09	87	CTH-X – Lake Wissota State Park	Eastbound signage omits Lake Wissota State Park
Chippewa	Cadott	91.14	146.68	91	WIS 27 – Cadott, Augusta	
Chippewa	Boyd	96.97	156.06	97	CTH-D – Boyd	
Chippewa	Stanley	101.72	163.70	101	CTH-H / CTH-X – Stanley	
Clark	Thorp	108.45	174.53	108	WIS 73 north / CTH-M – Thorp	
Clark	Withee	118.49	190.69	118	WIS 73 south / CTH-T – Withee, Neillsville	
Clark	Owen	121.52	195.57	122	CTH-X (Cardinal Avenue) – Owen	
Clark	Curtiss	126.76	204.00	127	CTH-E – Curtiss	
Clark	Abbotsford	131.20	211.15	131	Bus. WIS 29 – Abbotsford	Eastbound exit and westbound entrance only
Marathon	Abbotsford	132.91	213.90	132	WIS 13 – Colby, Abbotsford	
Marathon	Abbotsford	134.62	216.65	134	Bus. WIS 29 – Abbotsford	Eastbound entrance and westbound exit only
Marathon	Abbotsford	138.11	222.27		CTH-F – Cherokee	At-grade intersection
Marathon	Wien	144.95	233.27	145	WIS 97 – Athens, Marshfield	
Marathon	Wien	147.61	237.56		CTH-M – Wien	At-grade intersection
Marathon	Edgar	150.36	241.98	150	CTH-H – Edgar	
Marathon	Edgar	153.45	246.95		CTH-S – Rib Falls	At-grade intersection
Marathon	Marathon City	156.20	251.38	156	WIS 107 – Marathon City, Merrill	
Marathon	Wausau	159.10	256.05	159	CTH-O – North	
Marathon	Wausau	162.04	260.78	162	72nd Avenue	
Marathon	Wausau	164.35	264.50	164	Stewart Avenue US 51 north – Merrill	Northern end of US 51 concurrency; signed as exits 164A (Stewart Avenue) and 164B (US 51 north); signed as exit 192 on US 51; concurrency follows US 51's exit numbers
Marathon	Wausau	165.26	265.96	191	Sherman Street	Northbound exit and southbound entrance only
Marathon	Village of Rib Mountain	166.32	267.67	190	CTH-NN (North Mountain Road)	
Marathon	Village of Rib Mountain	167.98	270.34	188	CTH-N (Rib Mountain Drive)	
Marathon	Village of Rib Mountain	168.86	271.75	170	I-39 south / US 51 south – Stevens Point, Madison	Southern end of US 51 concurrency; northern terminus of I-39; exit 187 on I-39/US 51
Marathon	Rothschild	170.65	274.63	171	Bus. US 51 – Rothschild, Schofield	
Marathon	Weston	172.51	277.63	173	CTH-X (Camp Phillips Road) – Weston	
Marathon	Weston	176.13	283.45	177	CTH-J – Weston	
Marathon	Ringle	179.87	289.47	181	CTH-Q – Ringle	
Marathon	Hatley	184.05	296.20	185	CTH-Y – Hatley	
Marathon	Elderon	190.68	306.87		WIS 49 south – Elderon	At-grade intersection
Shawano	Wittenberg	194.56	313.11	195	US 45 north / Bus. WIS 29 / CTH-M – Antigo, Wittenberg	Western end of US 45 concurrency
Shawano	Wittenberg	195.74	315.01	196	Bus. WIS 29 / CTH-Q – Wittenberg	Eastbound entrance and westbound exit only
Shawano	Wittenberg	197.15	317.28	198	US 45 south / Bus. WIS 29 / CTH-Q – Clintonville, Wittenberg	Easter end of US 45 concurrency; eastbound signage omits Bus. WIS 29, County Q, and Wittenberg
Shawano	Wittenberg	202.83	326.42		CTH-J – Tigerton	At-grade intersection
Shawano	Tilleda	208.23	335.11		CTH-D north – Tilleda	At-grade intersection
Shawano	Tilleda	208.74	335.93		CTH-G south	At-grade intersection
Shawano	Tilleda	209.91	337.82		CTH-D south – Leopolis, Pella	At-grade intersection
Shawano	Thornton	214.91	345.86		CTH-U – Gresham	At-grade intersection
Shawano	Thornton	220.59	355.01		Bus. WIS 29 / CTH-MMM – Shawano	At-grade intersection
Shawano	Shawano	225.02	362.13	225	WIS 22 / CTH-CC – Shawano, Clintonville	
Shawano	Shawano	227.01	365.34	227	WIS 47 north / WIS 55 north / CTH-K / Bus. WIS 29 – Shawano	Western end of WIS 47/WIS 55 concurrency
Shawano	Bonduel	233.73	376.15	234	WIS 47 south / WIS 117 north – Bonduel, Appleton	Eastern end of WIS 47 concurrency
Shawano	Bonduel	236.50	380.61		CTH-BE – Bonduel	At-grade intersection; formerly WIS 29
Shawano	Angelica	238.57	383.94		CTH-F – Zachow	At-grade intersection
Shawano	Angelica	241.76	389.08	242	WIS 55 south / WIS 160 east – Pulaski, Seymour	Eastern end of WIS 55 concurrency
Brown	Oneida	249.05	400.81	249	WIS 32 north / WIS 156 west / CTH-Y – Pulaski, Gillett, Clintonville	Northwestern end of WIS 32 concurrency
Brown	Green Bay	252.44	406.26	253	CTH-VV (Marley Street, Triangle Drive)	Former at-grade J-turn (superstreet) intersection; roundabout interchange opened in August 2022
Brown	Green Bay	254.23	409.14	255	CTH-FF – Howard, Hobart	
Brown	Green Bay	256.82	413.31		CTH-EB (Packerland Drive)	Eastbound exit, westbound entrance
Brown	Green Bay	257.43	414.29		I-41 / US 41 / WIS 32 south – Marinette, Appleton	Southwestern end of WIS 32 concurrency; exit 169 on US 41; eastern end of WIS 32 expressway
Brown	Green Bay	261.66	421.10		US 141 north (Main St) / WIS 54 / WIS 57 (Monroe Ave) – De Pere, Algoma, Sturgeon Bay	Western end of US 141 concurrency
Brown	Bellevue	268.58	432.24		US 141 south – Denmark, Manitowoc	Eastern end of US 141 concurrency
Brown	Poland	273.38	439.96		CTH-T – New Franken, Denmark	
Brown	Henrysville	275.38	443.18		CTH-P	
Kewaunee	Pilsen	277.36	446.37		CTH-V – Curran	
Kewaunee	Stangelville				CTH-AB – Luxemburg, Mishicot	Former WIS 163
Kewaunee	Kewaunee	289.75	466.31		WIS 42 / LMCT – Algoma, Sturgeon Bay, Manitowoc	Eastern terminus
1.000 mi = 1.609 km; 1.000 km = 0.621 mi: Concurrency terminus

== Business routes ==
WIS 29 has four business routes:

- Business WIS 29 in Chippewa Falls
- Business WIS 29 in Abbotsford
- Business WIS 29 in Wittenberg
- Business WIS 29 in Shawano
