= Wheaton, Wisconsin =

Town of Wheaton
- Town
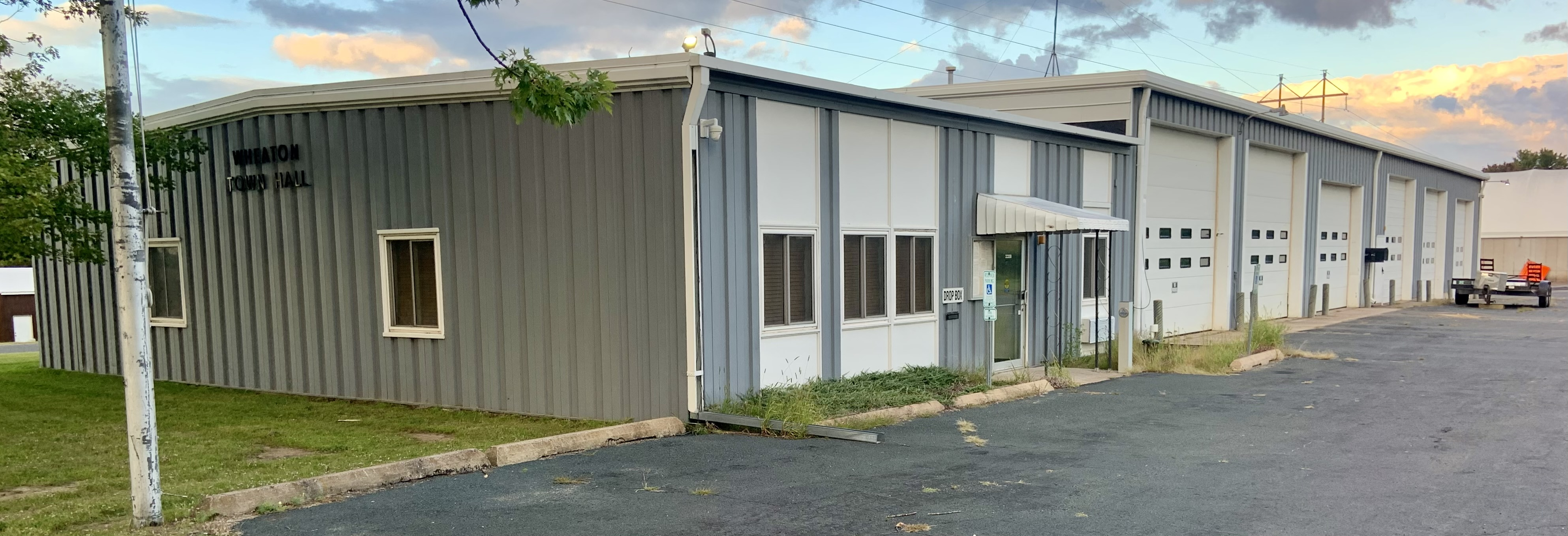
- Town hall

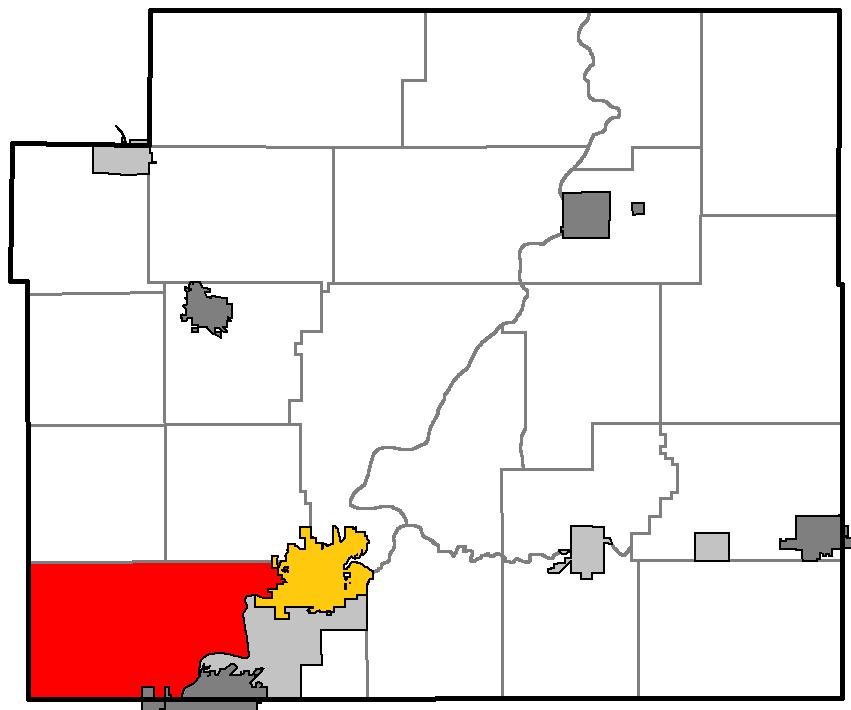
- Location of Wheaton within Chippewa County

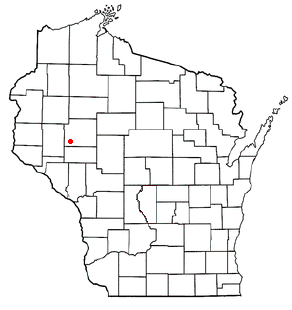
- Location of the Town of Wheaton
- Coordinates: 44°54′11″N 91°33′33″W
- Country: United States
- State: Wisconsin
- County: Chippewa

Area
  - Total: 54.8 sq mi (142.0 km^{2})
  - Land: 54.4 sq mi (140.8 km^{2})
  - Water: 0.46 sq mi (1.2 km^{2})
- Elevation: 981 ft (299 m)

Population (2020)
  - Total: 2,759
  - Density: 50.75/sq mi (19.60/km^{2})
- Time zone: UTC-6 (Central (CST))
  - Summer (DST): UTC-5 (CDT)
- Area codes: 715 & 534
- FIPS code: 55-86537
- GNIS feature ID: 1584423
- PLSS township: T28N R10W and part of T28N R9W
- Website: townofwheatonwi.gov

The Town of Wheaton is located in Chippewa County in the U.S. state of Wisconsin. The population was 2,759 at the 2020 census, up from 2,701 at the 2010 census. The unincorporated communities of Old Albertville and Pine Grove are located in the town.

== Geography ==
The town of Wheaton is in the southwestern corner of Chippewa County, bordered by Dunn County to the west and Eau Claire County to the south. The Chippewa River forms the southeastern border of the town, across which is the city of Chippewa Falls in the north, the village of Lake Hallie in the center, and the city of Eau Claire in the south. Chippewa Falls also has a land border with Wheaton in the northeast, and Eau Claire has a land border to the south of Wheaton. According to the United States Census Bureau, the town has a total area of 54.8 square miles (142.0 km^{2}), of which 54.4 square miles (140.8 km^{2}) is land and 0.46 square miles (1.2 km^{2}), or 0.86%, is water.

== History ==
The outlines of the 6-by-6-mile (10 by 10 km) squares that became the Town of Wheaton were first surveyed in the fall of 1848 by crews working for the U.S. government. In August and September 1849 another crew marked all the section corners, walking the woods and wading the streams, measuring with chain and compass. When done, the deputy surveyor filed this general description of the six mile square that contains the east end of Wheaton, along the river:

The land in this Township East of Chippewa River is very Sandy producing only Yellow & Pitch(?) Pine Timber except near the Swamps where White Pine, Birch & Elm is found. West of the River in the N.W. corner of the Township are several Sections of Aspen Thickets having a soil of sand & loam 2d rate land. but they are nearly destitute of water. Chippewa Rive is navigable for Keal Boats at all seasons of the year but the(?) rapids in Sections 15 & 22 and in Section 32 render the navigation difficult.

The deputy surveyor filed this general description of the six-mile square that is the west end of Wheaton:

The Surface of this Township is high & mostly rolling. The soil is sandy and not verry Productive. The prairies are in the ravines and valleys of the Streams and have a verry Sandy soil. The Timber is of Two kinds Oak and Pine. The Oak is found in Sections 1, 12, and 13. The Pine Timber is all found along Elk Creek, in the Western part of the Township and is Small Black or Pitch Pine. The principal Stream is Elk Creek which has a gentle current, sandy bed and banks and is well stored with Trout. It runs South through the West side of the Township. The Remainder of the Township is nearly Destitute of Water.

== Demographics ==
Historical population
Census	Pop.	Note	%±
1970	1,652		—
1980	2,017		22.1%
1990	2,279		13.0%
2000	2,366		3.8%
2010	2,701		14.2%
2020	2,759		2.1%

As of the census of 2000, there were 2,366 people, 852 households, and 692 families residing in the town. The population density was 43.2 people per square mile (16.7/km^{2}). There were 874 housing units at an average density of 15.9 per square mile (6.2/km^{2}). The racial makeup of the town was 98.27% White, 0.08% African American, 0.38% Native American, 0.08% Asian, 0.17% Pacific Islander, and 1.01% from two or more races. Hispanic or Latino of any race were 0.25% of the population.

There were 852 households, out of which 36.7% had children under the age of 18 living with them, 72.3% were married couples living together, 5.4% had a female householder with no husband present, and 18.7% were non-families. 13.3% of all households were made up of individuals, and 5.2% had someone living alone who was 65 years of age or older. The average household size was 2.77 and the average family size was 3.04.

The population distribution was 26.1% under the age of 18, 6.9% from 18 to 24, 30.2% from 25 to 44, 27.8% from 45 to 64, and 9.0% who were 65 years of age or older. The median age was 38 years. For every 100 females, there were 104.5 males. For every 100 females age 18 and over, there were 103.8 males.

The median income for a household in the town was $52,692, and the median income for a family was $55,061. Males had a median income of $34,549 versus $26,176 for females. The per capita income for the town was $20,023. About 2.0% of families and 3.5% of the population were below the poverty line, including 1.5% of those under age 18 and 6.3% of those age 65 or over.

== Culture ==
- The fictional character of Recondo (G.I. Joe), part of G.I. Joe: A Real American Hero, was said to be from Wheaton.
