= Cadott, Wisconsin =

- Village
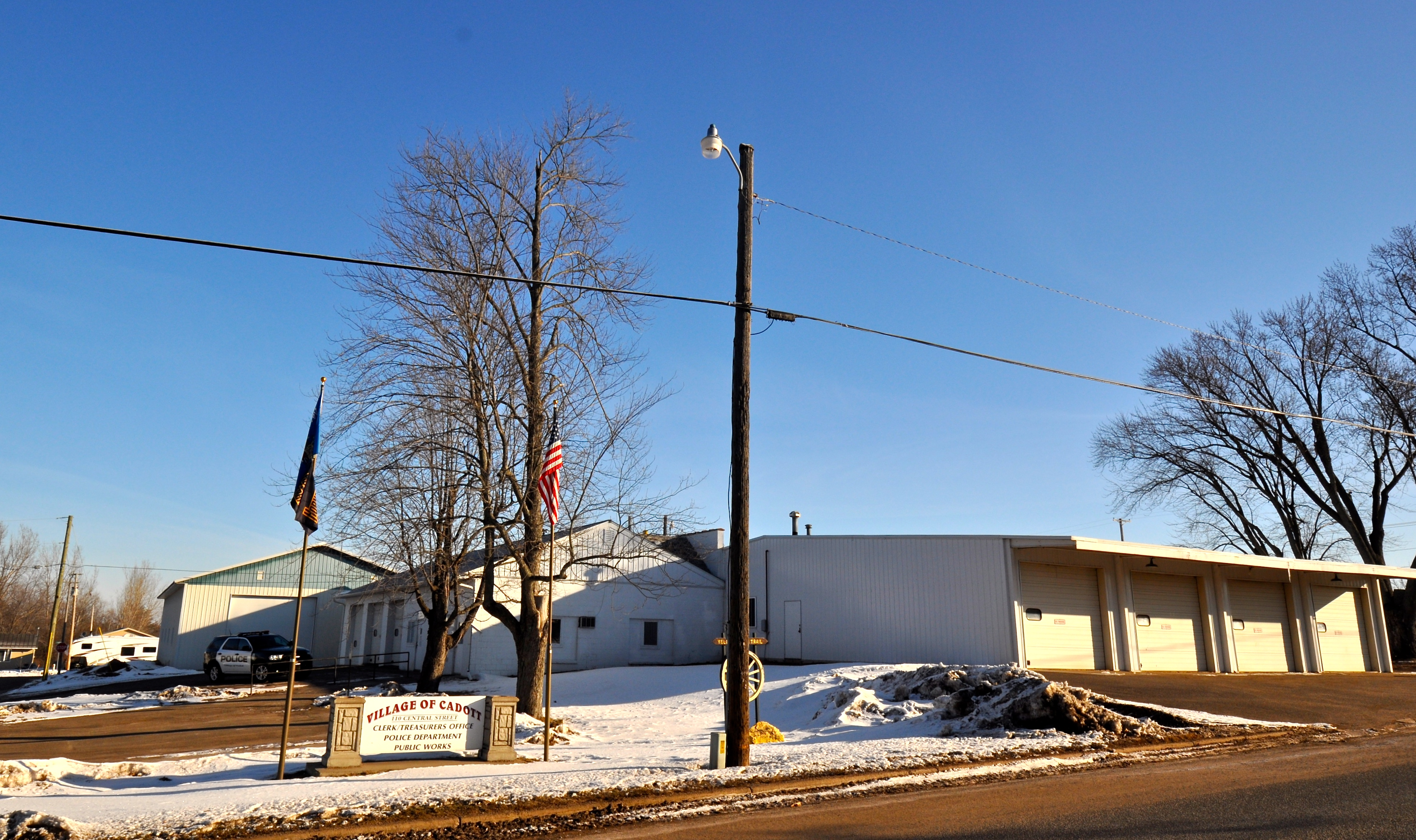
- Village of Cadott, February 2015.

- Location of Cadott in Chippewa County, Wisconsin.
- Coordinates: 44°56′55″N 91°9′5″W
- Country: United States
- State: Wisconsin
- County: Chippewa

Area
  - Total: 3.48 sq mi (9.01 km^{2})
  - Land: 3.40 sq mi (8.81 km^{2})
  - Water: 0.073 sq mi (0.19 km^{2})
- Elevation: 980 ft (300 m)

Population (2020)
  - Total: 1,498
  - Density: 440/sq mi (170/km^{2})
- Time zone: UTC-6 (Central (CST))
  - Summer (DST): UTC-5 (CDT)
- Area codes: 715 & 534
- FIPS code: 55-11750
- GNIS feature ID: 1562502
- Website: villageofcadott.com

Cadott is a village in Chippewa County in the U.S. state of Wisconsin where WIS 27 crosses WIS 29 and the Yellow River. The population was 1,498 at the 2020 census.

== History ==
In the late 1700s or early 1800s Jean Baptiste Cadotte, son of French Canadian fur trader Michel Cadotte of the Madeline Island area, established a trading post on the Yellow River near modern Cadott.

In 1865 Cadott's first settler arrived - Robert Marriner, who built a dam on the river to power a sawmill which could cut 10,000 feet of lumber in 11 hours. The following year Mrs. Marriner joined him, along with three men - Manott, Gungel and Rabbies - who built a tannery. More settlers followed. In 1868 the settlement's first school opened, in a log cabin. In 1872 a post office opened; before that, mail had to be sent for from Chippewa Falls. Marriner built a second dam in 1872 to power the gristmill he built the following year. Marriner platted the first section of town in 1875, naming it "Cadotte Falls" after the earlier trading post. That year the community voted to build a larger schoolhouse. A barrel-heading mill began operation in 1876.

In 1880 the Wisconsin & Minnesota Railroad Company built its new rail line from Abbotsford to Chippewa Falls through Cadott, greatly increasing the town's commercial prospects. That same year the first hotel (the Commercial Hotel) was built and a predecessor of Clark Manufacturing moved to town from De Pere to make hubs, spokes and lumber. The Record weekly newspaper began publication in 1881. A Presbyterian congregation was organized in 1882 and a Methodist congregation in 1883. In 1883 the Cadott House hotel was added and another steam saw and planing mill. A high school was added in 1884, and the Scrap Brotherhood built a public hall with a stage. St. Rose Catholic church was built in 1885, with services conducted twice a month by a priest from Notre Dame in Chippewa Falls. By 1891 the settlement had about 900 people. Cadott incorporated as a village in 1895.

By 1913 Cadott's population was about 800. The village had set up an electric light plant in 1912, and a public water system with a wooden water tower about the same time. By then the town also had banks, a box factory and a creamery, a cheese factory, a flour mill, and a potato-raising business.

On July 21, 2020, a tornado hit the north side of the village. It damaged structures, but did not injure anybody.

== Geography ==
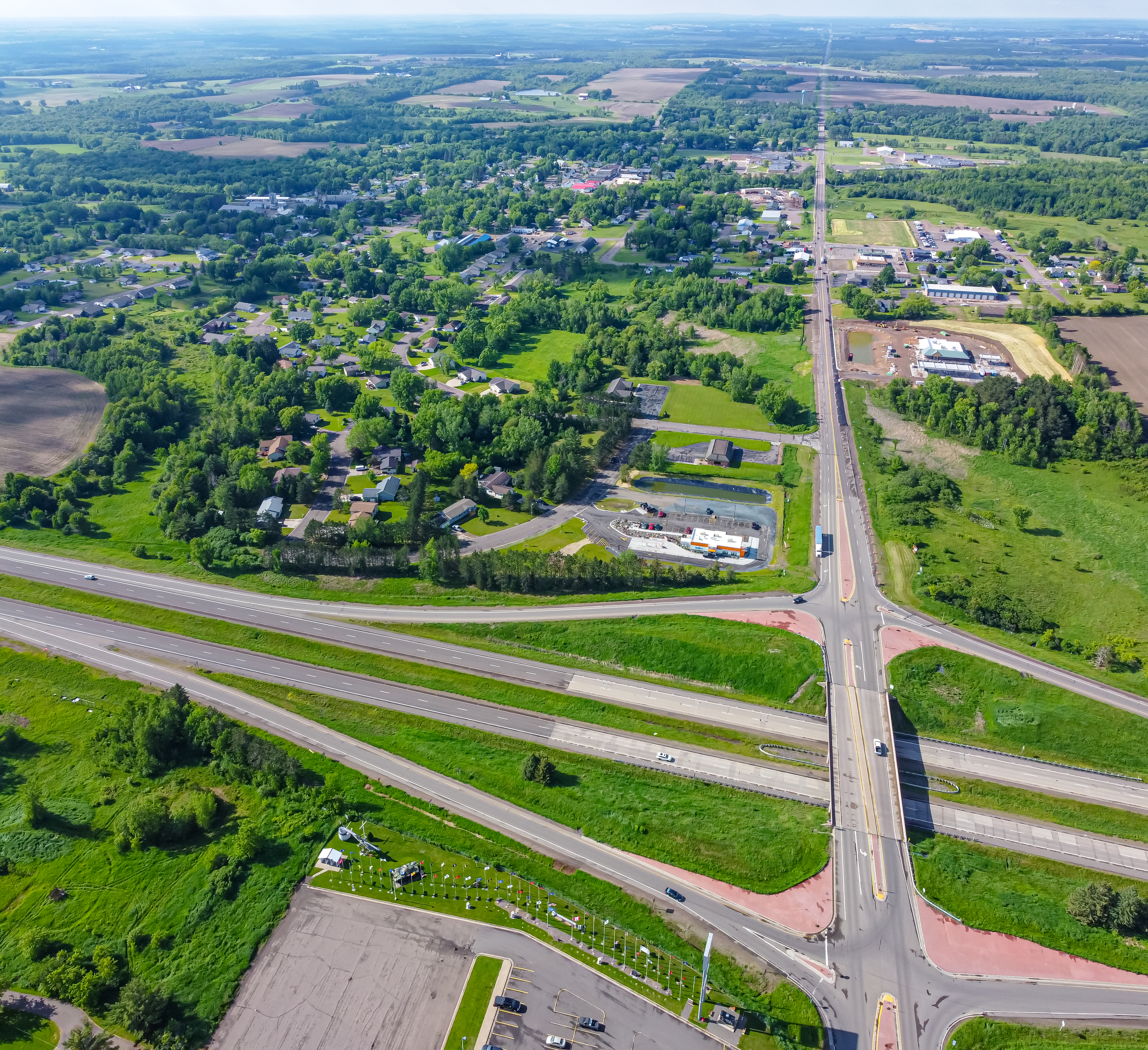

Cadott is located at 44°56′55″N 91°9′5″W (44.948515, -91.151304).

According to the United States Census Bureau, the village has an area of 3.38 square miles (8.75 km^{2}), of which 3.31 square miles (8.57 km^{2}) is land and 0.07 square miles (0.18 km^{2}) is water.

Cadott has the distinction of being equidistant from the Equator and North Pole. Billboards on Hwy. 27 between Cadott and Cornell offer tourists the opportunity to be photographed by the unusual signs.

== Demographics ==
Historical population
Census	Pop.	Note	%±
1880	72		—
1890	889		1,134.7%
1900	840		−5.5%
1910	765		−8.9%
1920	723		−5.5%
1930	631		−12.7%
1940	314		−50.2%
1950	250		−20.4%
1960	262		4.8%
1970	977		272.9%
1980	1,247		27.6%
1990	1,328		6.5%
2000	1,345		1.3%
2010	1,437		6.8%
2020	1,498		4.2%
U.S. Decennial Census

2000 Census Age Pyramid for Eau Claire County

=== 2010 census ===
As of the census of 2010, there were 1,437 people, 605 households, and 369 families living in the village. The population density was 434.1 inhabitants per square mile (167.6/km^{2}). There were 649 housing units at an average density of 196.1 per square mile (75.7/km^{2}). The racial makeup of the village was 98.1% White, 0.3% African American, 0.1% Native American, 0.4% Asian, and 1.1% from two or more races. Hispanic or Latino of any race were 0.5% of the population.

There were 605 households, of which 34.0% had children under the age of 18 living with them, 41.0% were married couples living together, 15.0% had a female householder with no husband present, 5.0% had a male householder with no wife present, and 39.0% were non-families. 33.9% of all households were made up of individuals, and 16.7% had someone living alone who was 65 years of age or older. The average household size was 2.32 and the average family size was 2.98.

The median age in the village was 36.5 years. 27.2% of residents were under the age of 18; 8.3% were between the ages of 18 and 24; 23.6% were from 25 to 44; 23.3% were from 45 to 64; and 17.5% were 65 years of age or older. The gender makeup of the village was 47.5% male and 52.5% female.

=== 2000 census ===
As of the census of 2000, there were 1,345 people, 562 households, and 382 families living in the village. The population density was 405.1 people per square mile (156.4/km^{2}). There were 581 housing units at an average density of 175.0 per square mile (67.6/km^{2}). The racial makeup of the village was 98.81% White, 0.07% African American, 0.07% Native American, 0.52% Asian, 0.07% from other races, and 0.45% from two or more races. Hispanic or Latino of any race were 0.15% of the population.

There were 562 households, out of which 32.7% had children under the age of 18 living with them, 51.8% were married couples living together, 12.1% had a female householder with no husband present, and 31.9% were non-families. 28.8% of all households were made up of individuals, and 16.7% had someone living alone who was 65 years of age or older. The average household size was 2.37 and the average family size was 2.90.

In the village, the population was spread out, with 27.0% under the age of 18, 10.0% from 18 to 24, 25.0% from 25 to 44, 18.4% from 45 to 64, and 19.6% who were 65 years of age or older. The median age was 38 years. For every 100 females, there were 96.1 males. For every 100 females age 18 and over, there were 86.7 males.

The median income for a household in the village was $33,295, and the median income for a family was $38,333. Males had a median income of $27,014 versus $20,000 for females. The per capita income for the village was $15,778. About 6.8% of families and 8.5% of the population were below the poverty line, including 8.8% of those under age 18 and 11.3% of those age 65 or over.

== Education ==
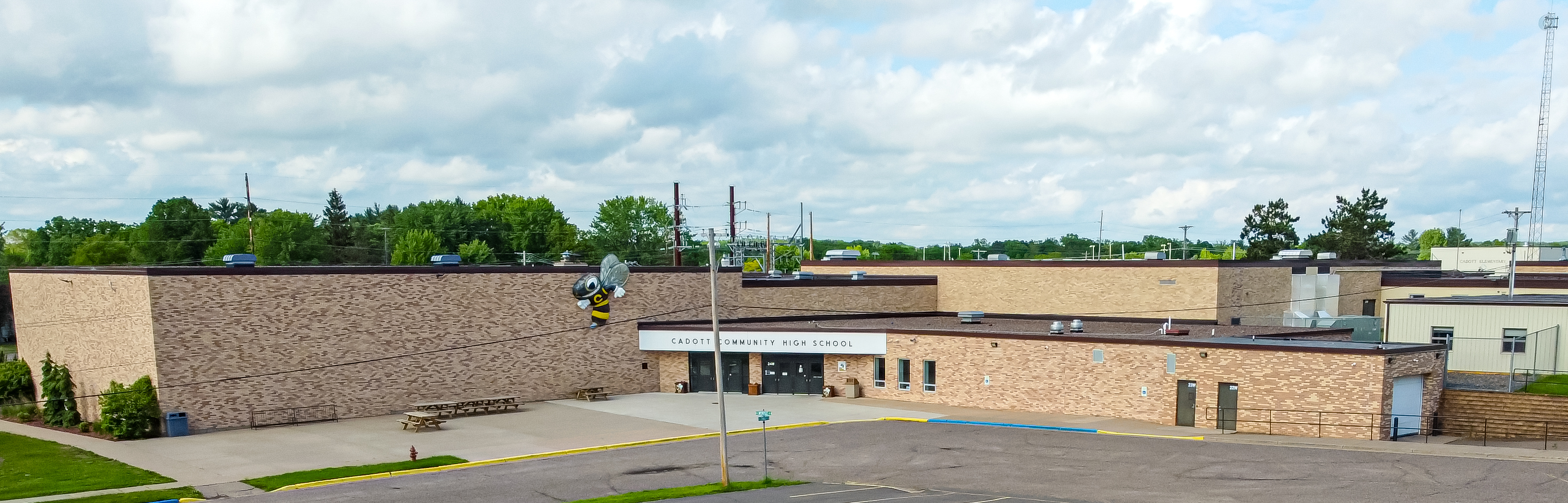
Cadott High School

The community is served by the School District of Cadott Community.

=== Athletics ===
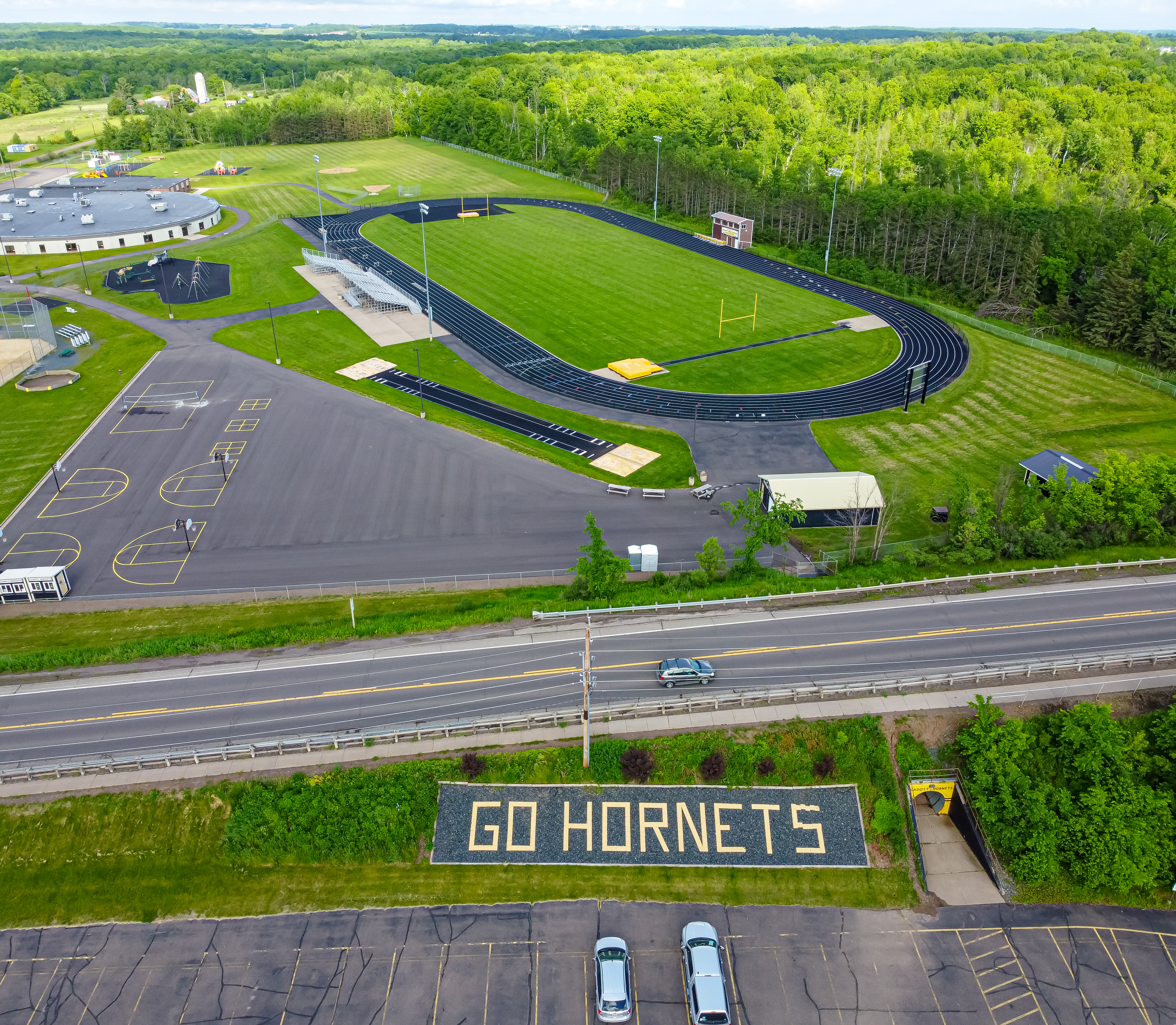
Cadott High School athletic fields

The Cadott High School wrestling program has included many state champions as well as team championships. Cadott was D3 state champion in 2007 and state runner up in 2005.

== Rock Fest and Country Fest ==
Since 1987, Cadott has hosted hosts two annual music festivals, Country Fest and Rock Fest. The camping and concert area is roughly eight miles outside the village. Both music festivals attract fans nationwide and include some of the top singers and bands from each genre. As a result, the events have a significant impact on the local economy.

== See also ==
- List of villages in Wisconsin
