= Lafayette, Chippewa County, Wisconsin =

Lafayette, Wisconsin
- Town
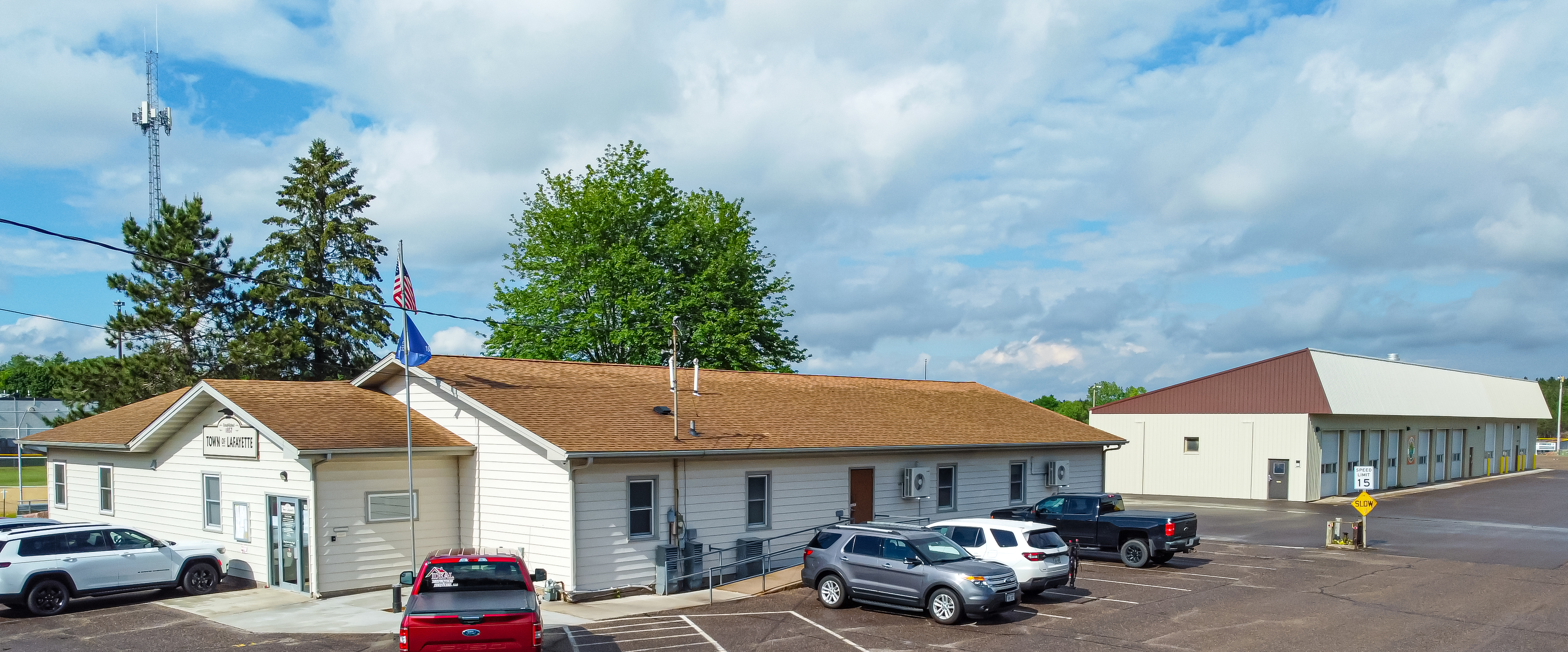
- Lafayette Town Hall

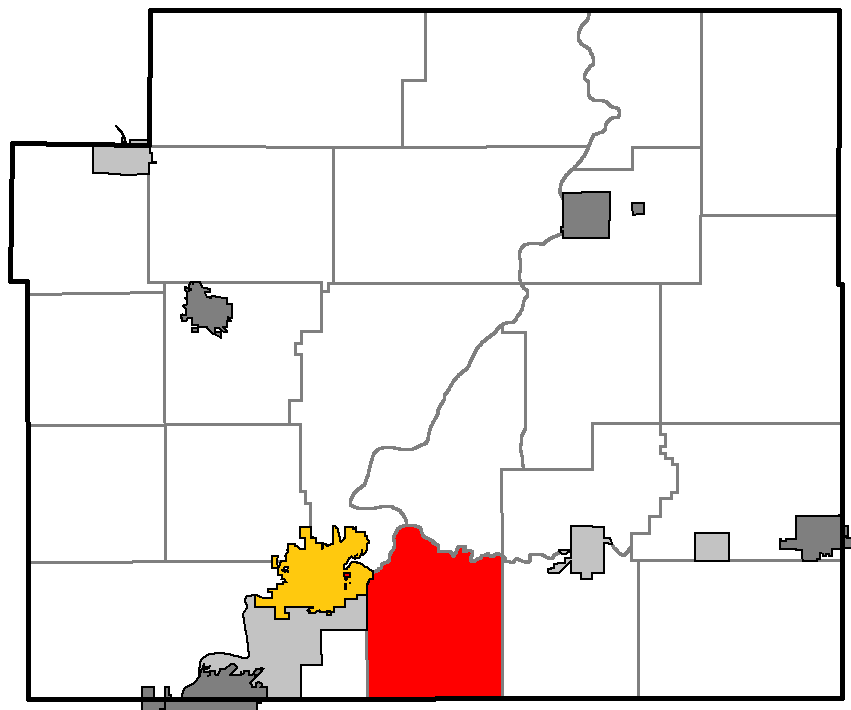
- Location of Lafayette within Chippewa County

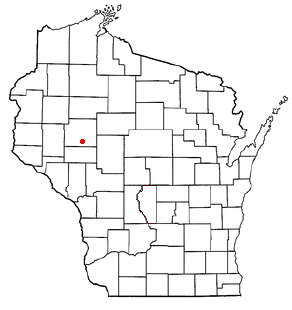
- Location of Lafayette, Wisconsin
- Coordinates: 44°55′30″N 91°17′57″W
- Country: United States
- State: Wisconsin
- County: Chippewa

Area
  - Total: 39.1 sq mi (101.3 km^{2})
  - Land: 34.5 sq mi (89.4 km^{2})
  - Water: 4.6 sq mi (11.9 km^{2})
- Elevation: 974 ft (297 m)

Population (2020)
  - Total: 6,197
  - Density: 180/sq mi (69.3/km^{2})
- Time zone: UTC-6 (Central (CST))
  - Summer (DST): UTC-5 (CDT)
- Area codes: 715 & 534
- FIPS code: 55-40900
- GNIS feature ID: 1583502
- PLSS township: East half of T28N R8W, west half of T28N R7W, and bits of the two townships to the north
- Website: https://lafayettetownship.org/

Lafayette is a town in Chippewa County in the U.S. state of Wisconsin. The population was 6,197 at the 2020 census. The census-designated place of Lake Wissota is located within the town. The unincorporated community of Bateman is also located in the town.

== Education ==
Lafayette is served by the School District of Cadott Community and the Chippewa Falls Area Unified School District.

== Geography ==
Lafayette is a six by six mile square, except that the north side is irregular, following the course of the Yellow River. According to the United States Census Bureau, the town has a total area of 39.1 square miles (101.3 km^{2}), of which 34.5 square miles (89.4 km^{2}) is land and 4.6 square miles (11.9 km^{2}) (11.74%) is water.

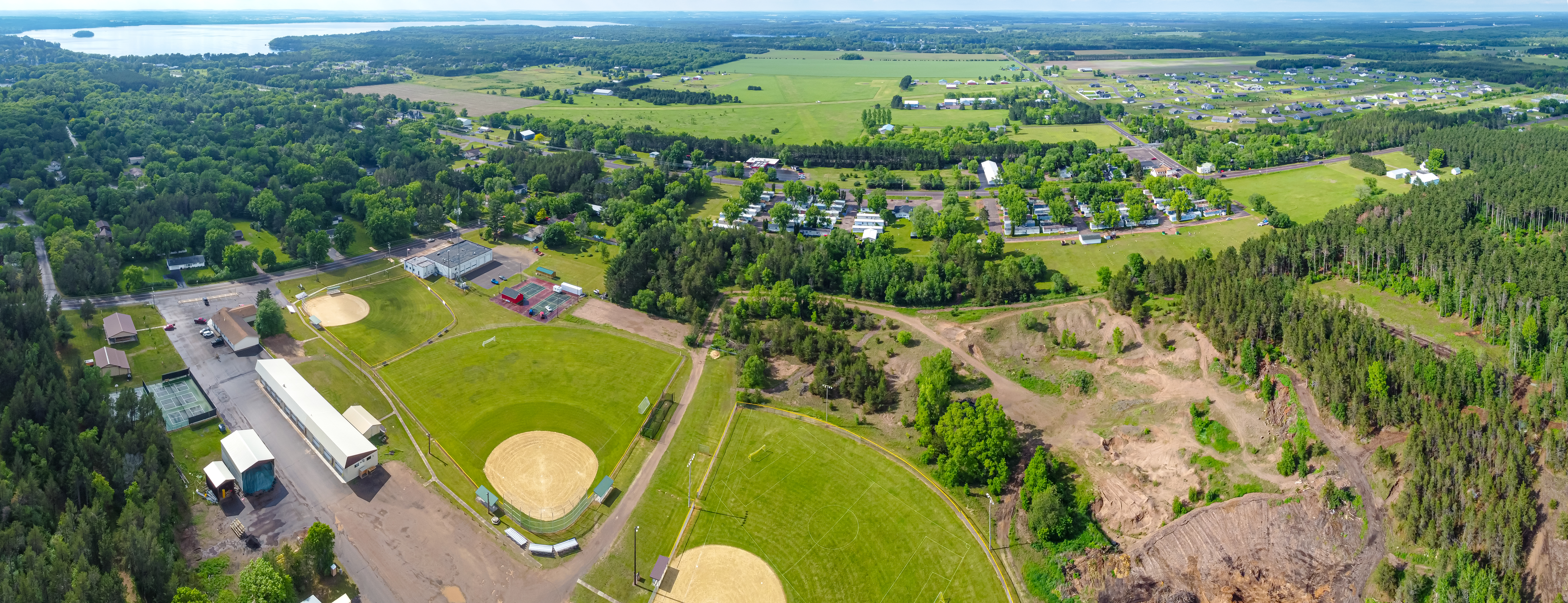

== History ==
The outlines of the 6-mile squares that would become the Town of Lafayette were first surveyed in the fall of 1848 by crews working for the U.S. government. In August and September 1849 another crew marked all the section corners of the eastern half of modern Lafayette (and the west half of modern Sigle), walking the woods and swamps on foot, measuring with chain and compass. When done, the deputy surveyor filed this general description:

The Surface in the North-Eastern part of this Township is flat - the Soil wet and poor. - Timber Tamarack, Aspen, Birch, Maple and Pine. The Southern and North-Western part gently rolling. Much of the Soil good and adapted to farming purposes. The timber is small and thrifty - chiefly Maple, Birch Oak, Elm Ash and some small Pine.- It is tolerably well watered - the banks of the Streams are generally low and frequently overflow. The beds Sand and gravel - currents Sluggish.

For the surveyors' description of the square that includes the west half of modern Lafayette, see Hallie.

== Demographics ==
Historical population
Census	Pop.	Note	%±
1980	3,825		—
1990	4,448		16.3%
2000	5,199		16.9%
2010	5,765		10.9%
2020	6,197		7.5%

As of the census of 2000, there were 5,199 people, 1,980 households, and 1,520 families residing in the town. The population density was 150.6 people per square mile (58.2/km^{2}). There were 2,112 housing units at an average density of 61.2 per square mile (23.6/km^{2}). The racial makeup of the town was 98.56% White, 0.17% African American, 0.42% Native American, 0.27% Asian, 0.13% from other races, and 0.44% from two or more races. Hispanic or Latino of any race were 0.40% of the population.

There were 1,980 households, out of which 35.8% had children under the age of 18 living with them, 67.2% were married couples living together, 6.1% had a female householder with no husband present, and 23.2% were non-families. 17.0% of all households were made up of individuals, and 5.4% had someone living alone who was 65 years of age or older. The average household size was 2.63 and the average family size was 2.97.

In the town, the population was spread out, with 26.5% under the age of 18, 6.1% from 18 to 24, 30.2% from 25 to 44, 25.7% from 45 to 64, and 11.4% who were 65 years of age or older. The median age was 39 years. For every 100 females, there were 104.6 males. For every 100 females age 18 and over, there were 101.3 males.

The median income for a household in the town was $52,850, and the median income for a family was $58,776. Males had a median income of $36,442 versus $23,477 for females. The per capita income for the town was $23,172. About 3.0% of families and 4.0% of the population were below the poverty line, including 5.4% of those under age 18 and 5.1% of those age 65 or over.

== Notable people ==
- Thomas A. Roycraft, Wisconsin State Representative, lived in the town
- Cadwallader Jackson Wiltse, Wisconsin State Representative, lived in the town
