= Abbotsford, Wisconsin =

- City
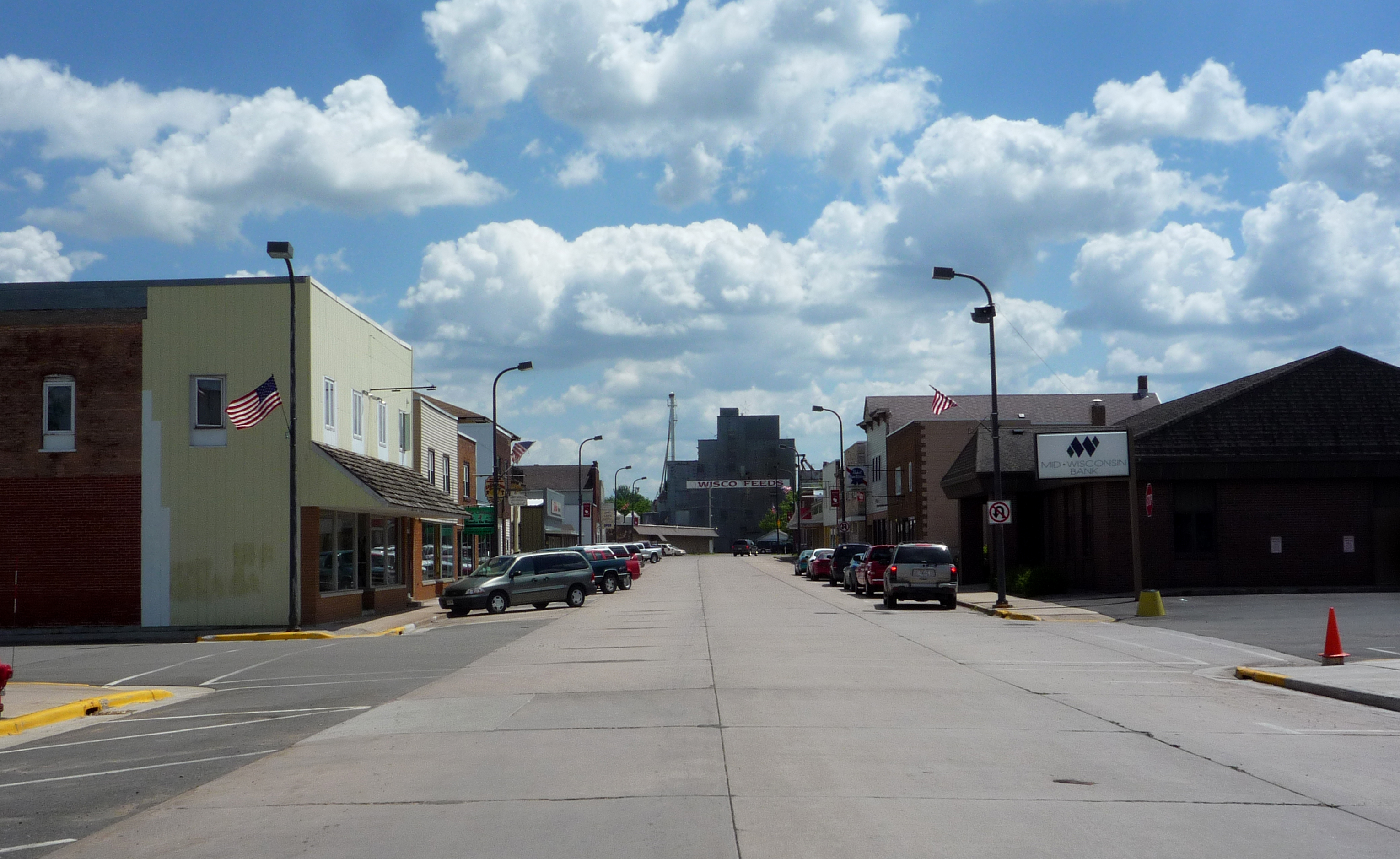
- First Street, downtown Abbotsford
- Nickname: Wisconsin's First City
- Location of Abbotsford in Clark County and Marathon County, Wisconsin.

- Location within Wisconsin Location within the United States
- Coordinates: 44°56′48″N 90°19′6″W
- Country: United States
- State: Wisconsin
- Counties: Clark, Marathon

Government
  - Mayor: James Weix

Area
  - Total: 3.03 sq mi (7.86 km^{2})
  - Land: 3.03 sq mi (7.86 km^{2})
  - Water: 0 sq mi (0.00 km^{2})
- Elevation: 1,407 ft (429 m)

Population (2020)
  - Total: 2,275
- Time zone: UTC-6 (Central (CST))
  - Summer (DST): UTC-5 (CDT)
- ZIP Code: 54405
- Area codes: 715 & 534
- FIPS code: 55-00100
- GNIS feature ID: 1560663
- Website: cityofabbotsfordwi.gov

Abbotsford is a city in Clark and Marathon counties in the U.S. state of Wisconsin. The population was 2,275 at the 2020 census. Of this, 1,665 were in Clark County, and 610 were in Marathon County. Abbotsford is nicknamed "Wisconsin's First City" due to its alphabetical place on a list of Wisconsin cities.

== History ==
In 1872, the Wisconsin Central Railroad cleared its right of way through the forest which would become Abbotsford, heading north for Ashland. Rails were built through the town site in 1874. In 1879 the directors of the Wisconsin Central decided to build west from Colby to Chippewa Falls, to connect there with the Chippewa Falls & Western and ultimately St. Paul. However, they found that Colby Hill was not a good site for a junction and rail yard, so they instead planned the east–west line 2.5 miles north of Colby. The place was called Colby Junction from 1879 to 1880, then renamed for Edwin H. Abbott of the Wisconsin Central.

Abbotsford incorporated as a village in 1894. The village incorporated as a city in 1965.

== Geography ==
Abbotsford is located at 44°56′48″N 90°19′6″W (44.946716, -90.318333).

According to the United States Census Bureau, the city has a total area of 2.71 square miles (7.02 km^{2}), all land.

== Demographics ==
Historical population
Census	Pop.	Note	%±
1900	443		—
1910	947		113.8%
1920	782		−17.4%
1930	781		−0.1%
1940	920		17.8%
1950	1,013		10.1%
1960	1,171		15.6%
1970	1,375		17.4%
1980	1,901		38.3%
1990	1,916		0.8%
2000	1,956		2.1%
2010	2,310		18.1%
2020	2,275		−1.5%
U.S. Decennial Census

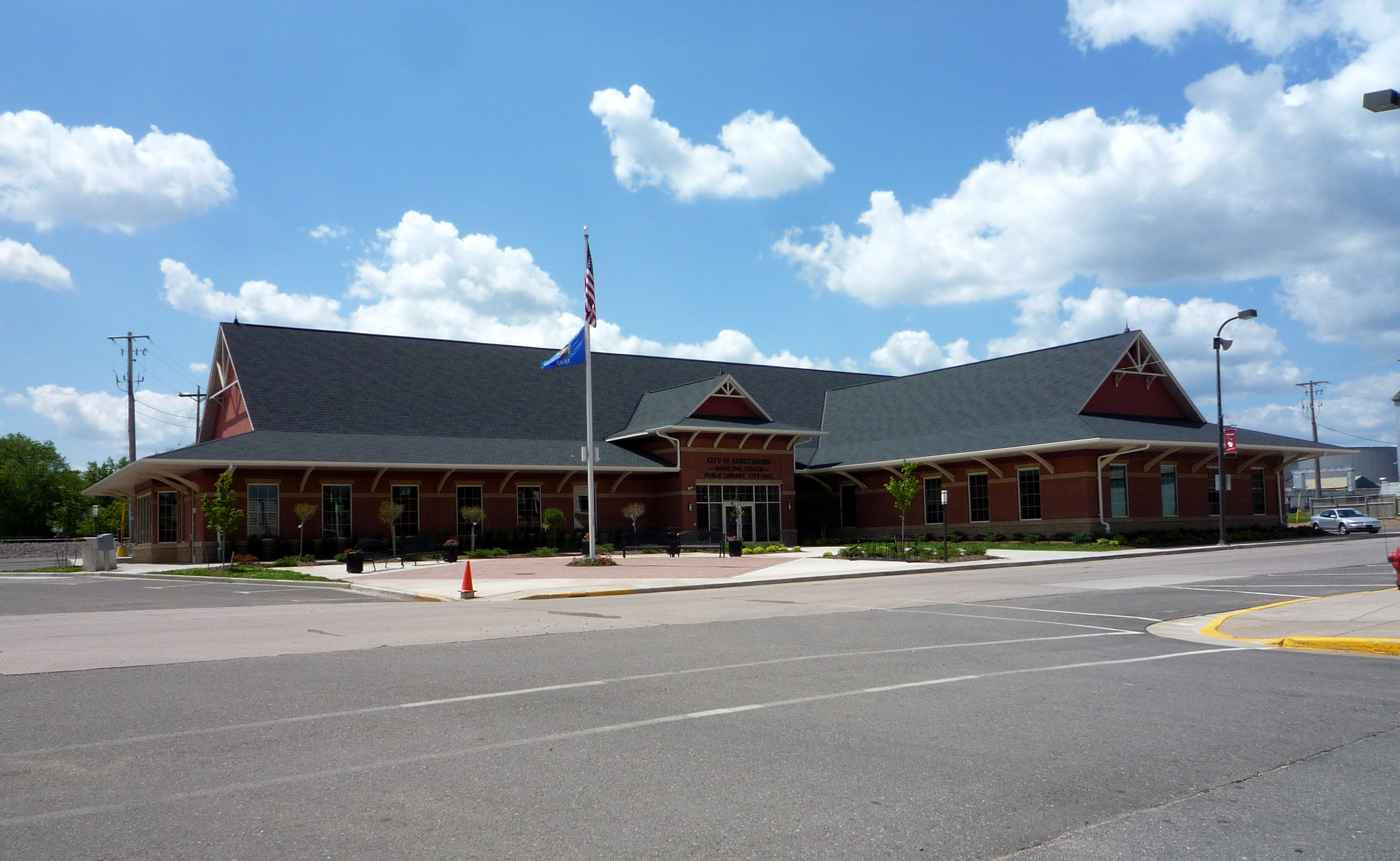
City of Abbotsford Municipal Center, housing the library and city hall

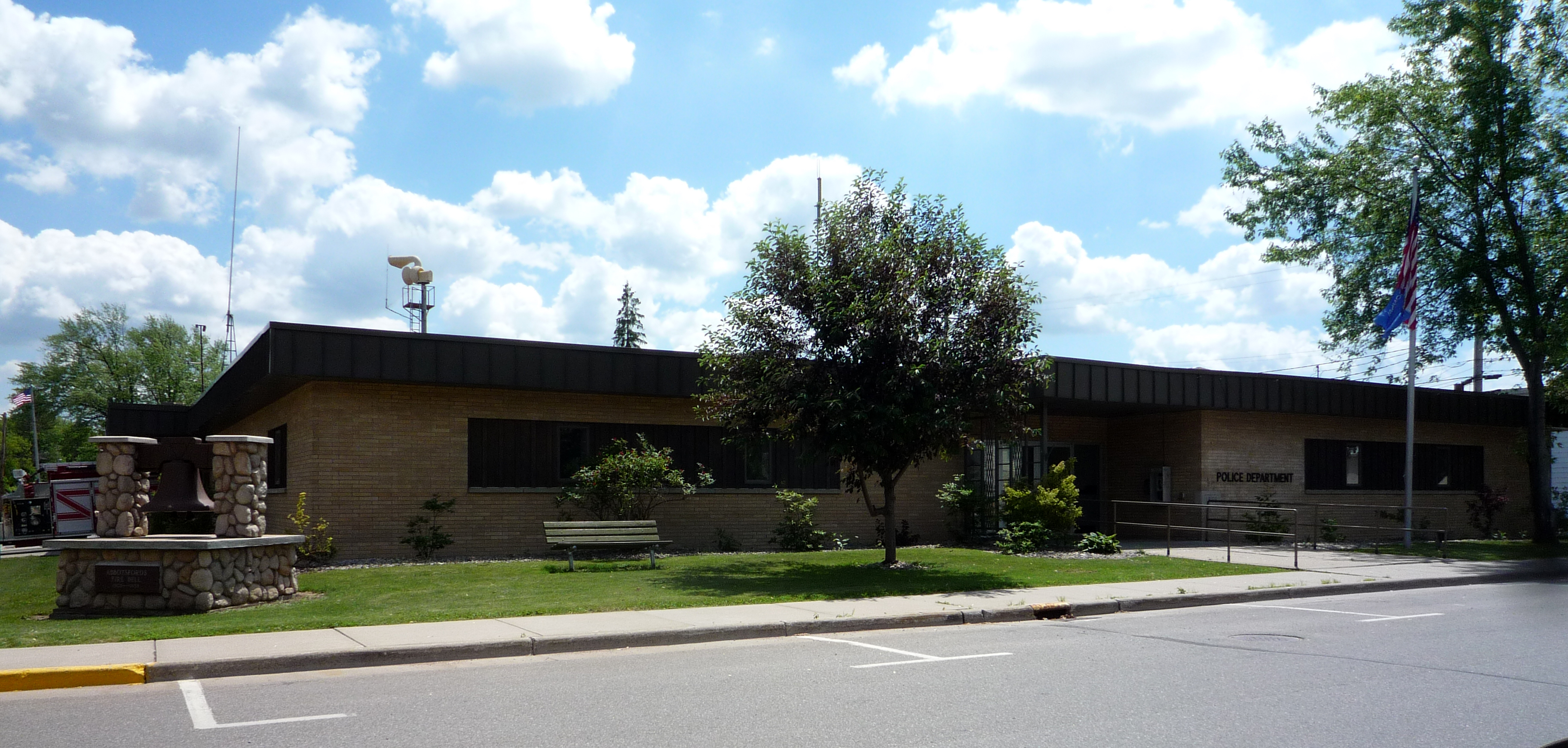
Fire and police departments

Abbotsford is part of the Wausau, Wisconsin Metropolitan Statistical Area.

In 2020 Abbotsford had a population of 2,275. The racial and ethnic composition was 65.9% white, 0.5% black or African American, 0.6% Native American, 0.8% Asian, 20.7% other race, and 11.4% two or more races. Hispanic or Latino of any race were 38.5% of the population.

=== 2010 census ===
As of the census of 2010, there were 2,310 people, 864 households, and 569 families living in the city. The population density was 852.4 inhabitants per square mile (329.1/km^{2}). There were 941 housing units at an average density of 347.2 per square mile (134.1/km^{2}). The racial makeup of the city was 81.9% White, 0.1% African American, 0.3% Native American, 0.7% Asian, 16.4% from other races, and 0.5% from two or more races. Hispanic or Latino of any race were 25.0% of the population.

There were 864 households, of which 33.9% had children under the age of 18 living with them, 51.2% were married couples living together, 8.8% had a female householder with no husband present, 5.9% had a male householder with no wife present, and 34.1% were non-families. 27.9% of all households were made up of individuals, and 14.3% had someone living alone who was 65 years of age or older. The average household size was 2.57 and the average family size was 3.14.

The median age in the city was 36.7 years. 25.8% of residents were under the age of 18; 8.7% were between the ages of 18 and 24; 24.8% were from 25 to 44; 20.9% were from 45 to 64; and 19.9% were 65 years of age or older. The gender makeup of the city was 50.2% male and 49.8% female.

=== 2000 census ===
As of the census of 2000, there were 1,956 people, 817 households, and 516 families living in the city. The population density was 641.1 people per square mile (247.6/km^{2}). There were 870 housing units at an average density of 285.1 per square mile (110.1/km^{2}). The racial makeup of the city was 98.57% White, 0.15% African American, 0.10% Native American, 0.05% Asian, 0.66% from other races, and 0.46% from two or more races. Hispanic or Latino of any race were 1.99% of the population.

There were 817 households, out of which 27.8% had children under the age of 18 living with them, 51.7% were married couples living together, 7.2% had a female householder with no husband present, and 36.8% were non-families. 31.8% of all households were made up of individuals, and 16.9% had someone living alone who was 65 years of age or older. The average household size was 2.31 and the average family size was 2.92.

In the city, the population was spread out, with 23.3% under the age of 18, 7.1% from 18 to 24, 28.0% from 25 to 44, 18.7% from 45 to 64, and 22.9% who were 65 years of age or older. The median age was 40 years. For every 100 females, there were 99.2 males. For every 100 females age 18 and over, there were 93.5 males.

The median income for a household in the city was $36,949, and the median income for a family was $46,058. Males had a median income of $30,650 versus $22,727 for females. The per capita income for the city was $17,133. About 1.9% of families and 6.7% of the population were below the poverty line, including 3.8% of those under age 18 and 13.6% of those age 65 or over.

== Education ==
Abbotsford Public Schools are part of the Abbotsford School District. The district has one elementary school, one middle/senior high school and one alternative high school and education center.

== Notable people ==
- Bruce F. Beilfuss, 22nd chief justice of the Wisconsin Supreme Court, lived and operated a law office in Abbotsford, and represented the area on the county board.
- Herman Hedrich, Wisconsin State Representative, lived in Abbotsford.
- Galen Laack, NFL player, was born in Abbotsford.
- Frank Nikolay, Wisconsin State Representative, lived in Abbotsford.

== Images ==
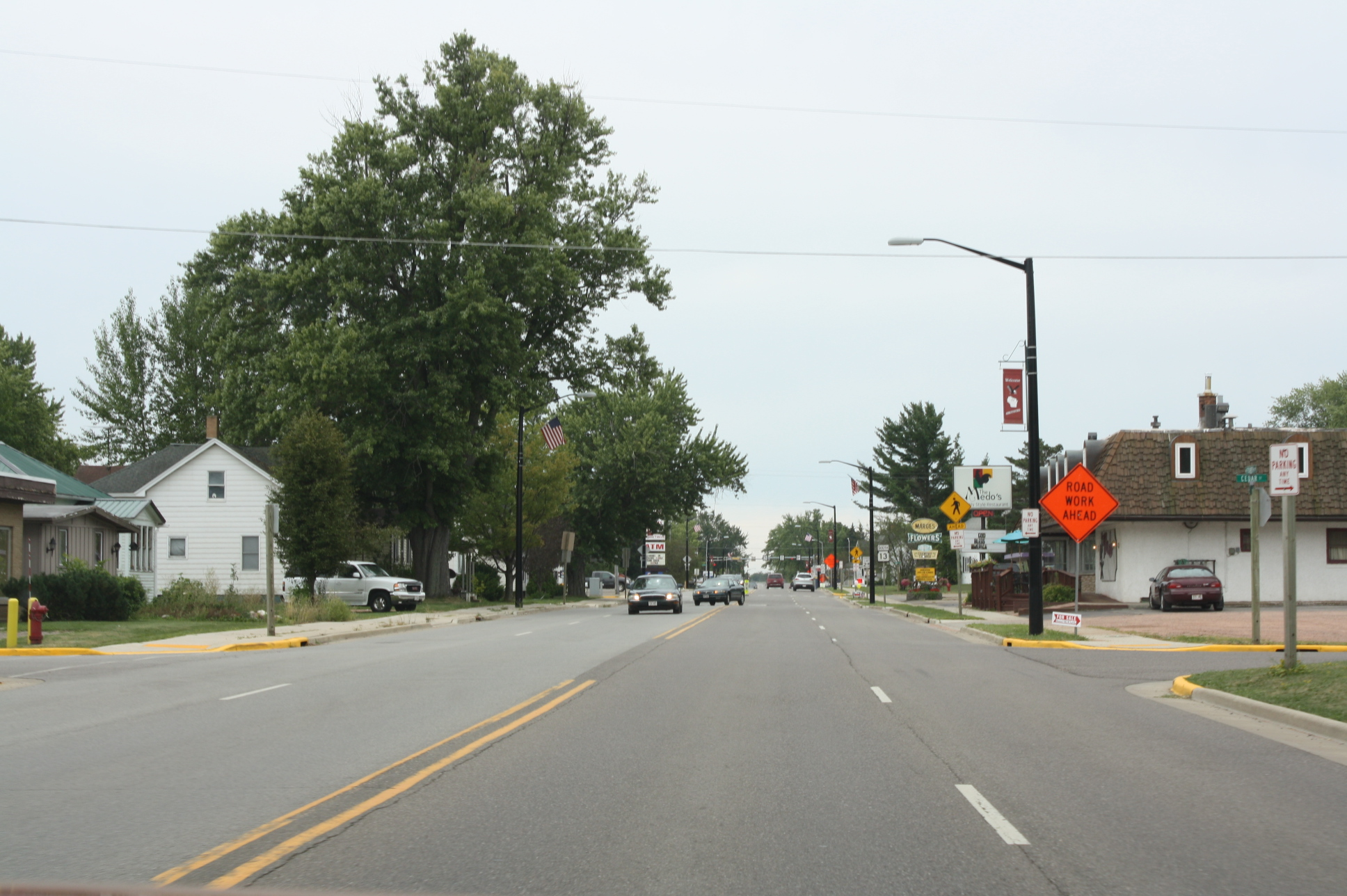
Looking south in Abbotsford

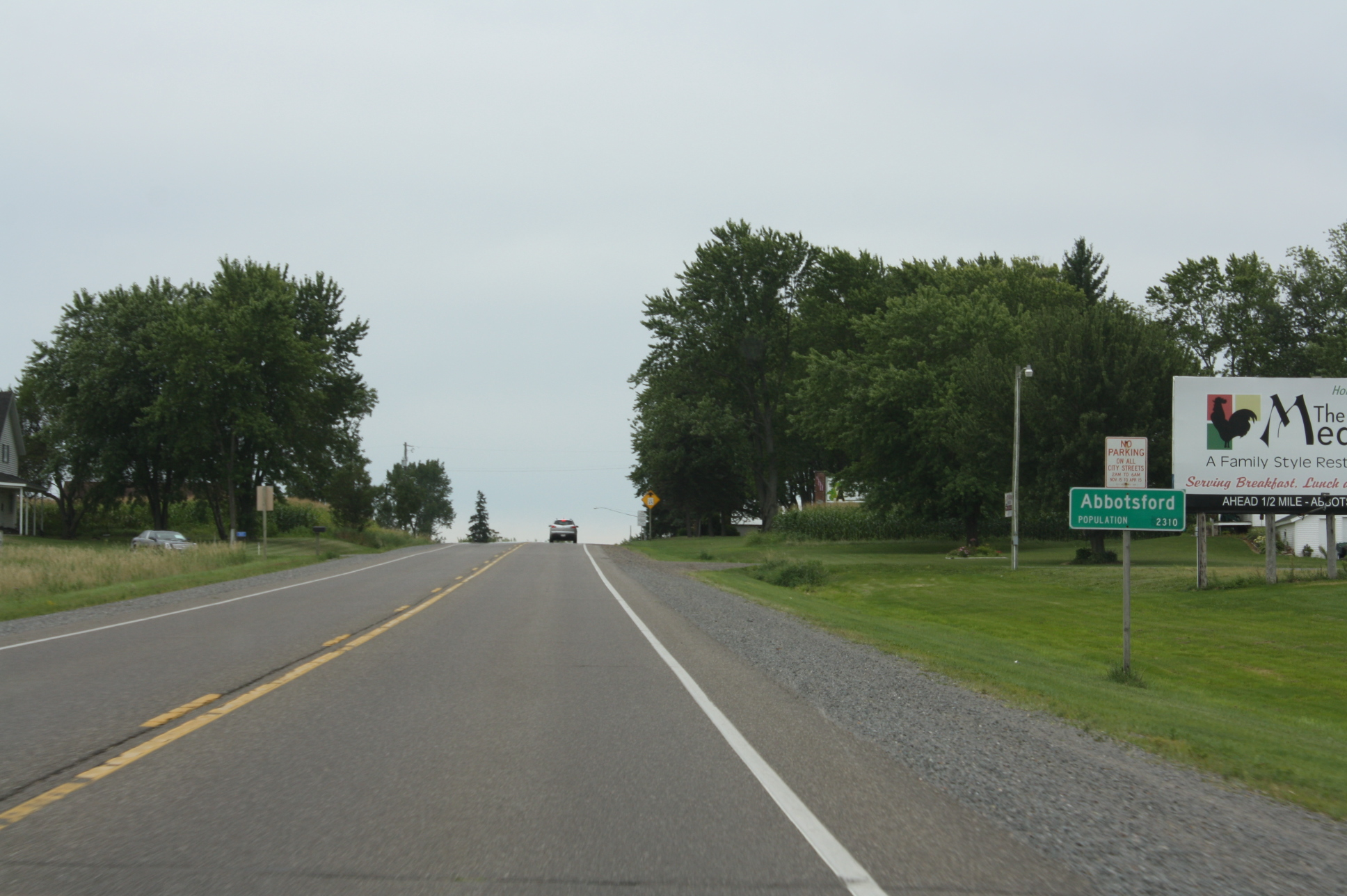
Sign on WIS13

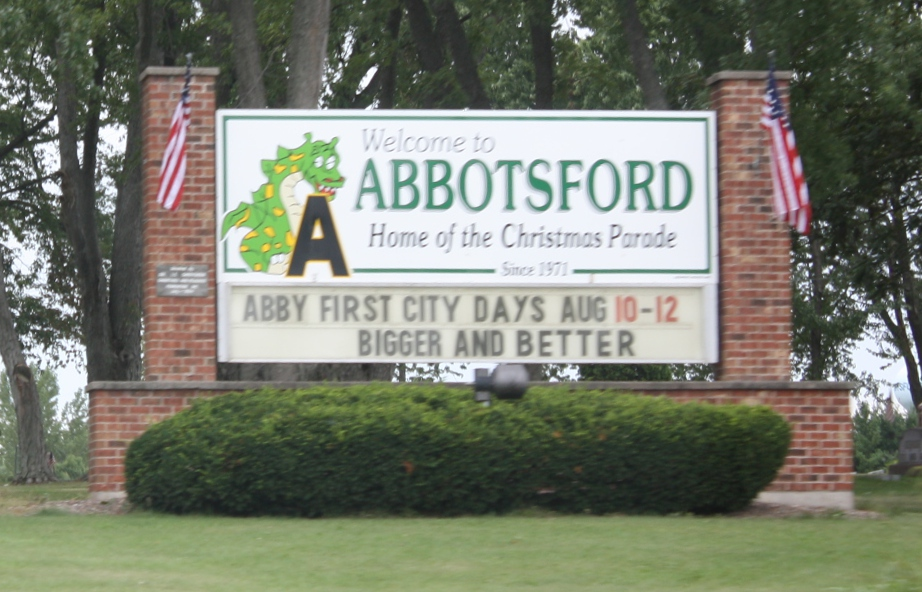
Welcome sign

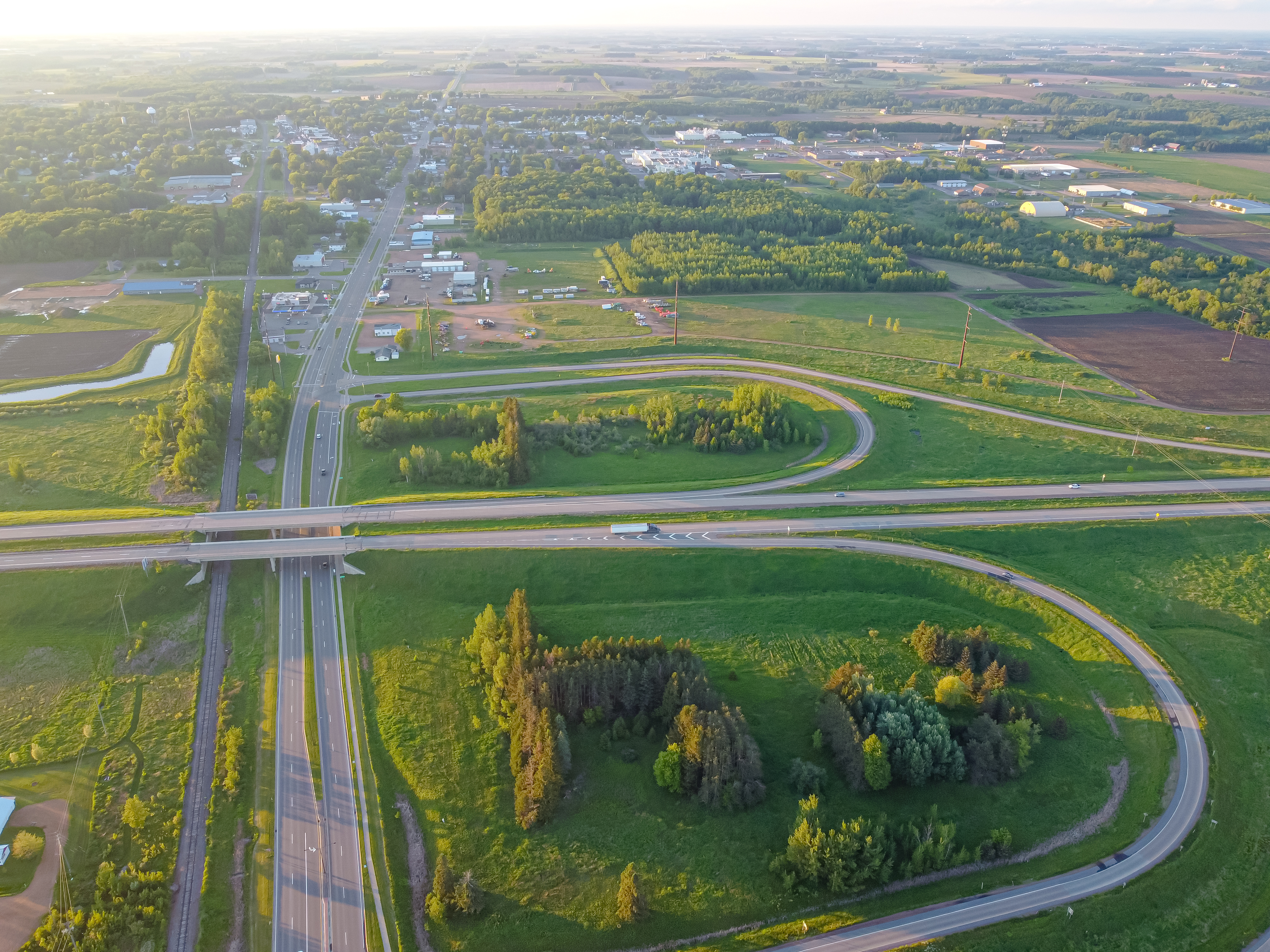
Looking north from Wis-29 up Wis-13
