= Hallie, Wisconsin =

- Town
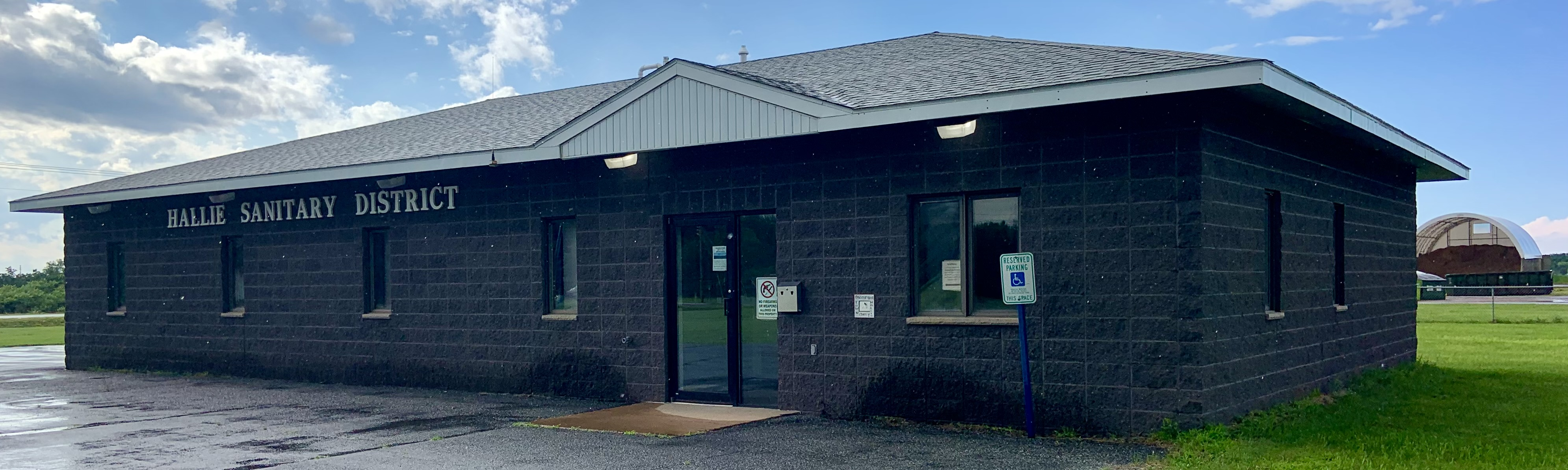
- Hallie Town Hall
- Interactive map of Hallie, Wisconsin
- Location within Wisconsin
- Coordinates: 44.8771°N 91.3737°W
- Country: United States
- State: Wisconsin
- County: Chippewa
- Founded: August 17, 1915
- Incorporated: February 18, 2003

Government
  - Chairman: Rodney Eslinger
  - Supervisors: Jack Gunderson; Jeffrey Peck
  - Deputy Clerk/Treasurer: John Andersen
  - Clerk/Treasurer: Sue Cance

Area
  - Total: 7.445 sq mi (19.282 km^{2})
  - Land: 7.445 sq mi (19.282 km^{2})
  - Water: 0 sq mi (0.000 km^{2}) 0.00%
- Elevation: 955 ft (291 m)

Population (2020)
  - Total: 153
  - Estimate (2025): 187
  - Density: 20.6/sq mi (7.93/km^{2})
- Time zone: UTC–6 (Central (CST))
  - Summer (DST): UTC–5 (CDT)
- ZIP Code: 54729
- Area code(s): 715 and 534
- FIPS code: 55-017-32125
- GNIS feature ID: 1583336
- PLSS township: part of T28N R8W
- Website: townofhalliewi.com

Hallie is a town in Chippewa County, Wisconsin, United States. The population was 153 of the 2020 census, and was estimated at 187 in 2025.

== History ==
The outlines of the 6-by-6-mile (10 by 10 km) square that became the town of Halley were first surveyed in the fall of 1848 by crews working for the U.S. government. In August and September 1849 another crew marked all the section corners, walking the woods and wading the river, measuring with chain and compass. When done, the deputy surveyor filed this general description of the six-mile square which includes Halley and the early town of Chippewa Falls:

The Surface of this Township is rolling. The Soil is uniformly Sandy, 2nd & 3rd rate. In the Southeast part of the Township is a well-timbered tract of land. The most valuable kinds of timber are White & Bur(?) Oak Black Ash Lind White Pine and Sugar. There is a Sugar Camp on the S.E. 1/4 of Section 21 and the N.E. 1/4 of Section 29.

The Falls of Chippewa River in This Township are a Succession of rapids over which the Lumbermen raft in safety Lumber Hewed timber and shingles The River falls about 25 feet in 3/4 of a mile, making an excellent water power which is improved by James Allen and Company. They now have four Saws in successful operation and a Lath Mill nearly completed.
There is one Store, one Tavern, and one Blacksmith Shop and several dwelling houses at the Falls all situated on the West half of the S.W. 1/4 of Section 5 and the East half of the S.E. 1/4 of Section 6. There are four dwelling Houses on the North half of Section 7.

The Pond in Sections 14 and 15 is much resorted to in the summer(?) Season for the purpose of hunting deer by torch light.

The Town of Hallie was founded on August 17, 1915. On February 18, 2003, however, most of the town incorporated as the village of Lake Hallie, taking with it nearly all of the town's population and reducing the town's remaining land area to 7.445 square miles (19.28 km^{2}).

== Geography ==
According to the United States Census Bureau, the town has a total area of 7.445 square miles (19.28 km^{2}), all land.

The town of Hallie is located along the southern edge of Chippewa County and is bordered to the south by Eau Claire County. It is bordered to the north and west by the village of Lake Hallie, formerly part of the town.

== Demographics ==
Historical population
Census	Pop.	Note	%±
1920	734		—
1930	792		7.9%
1940	1,020		28.8%
1950	1,423		39.5%
1960	2,530		77.8%
1970	3,568		41.0%
1980	4,275		19.8%
1990	4,531		6.0%
2000	4,703		3.8%
2010	161		−96.6%
2020	153		−5.0%
2025 (est.)	187		22.2%
U.S. Decennial Census; 2020 Census

=== 2020 census ===
As of the 2020 census, there were 153 people, 60 households, and 48 families residing in the town. The population density was 20.55 inhabitants per square mile (7.93/km^{2}). There were 64 housing units at an average density of 8.60 per square mile (3.32/km^{2}). The racial makeup of the town was 93.46% White, 0.65% African American, 0.65% Native American, 1.31% Asian, 0.00% Pacific Islander, 0.65% from some other races and 3.27% from two or more races. Hispanic or Latino people of any race were 1.96% of the population.

=== 2010 census ===
As of the 2010 census, there were 161 people, 60 households, and 46 families residing in the town. The population density was 21.63 inhabitants per square mile (8.35/km^{2}). There were 63 housing units at an average density of 8.46 per square mile (3.27/km^{2}). The racial makeup of the town was 94.41% White, 0.00% African American, 2.48% Native American, 2.48% Asian, 0.00% Pacific Islander, 0.62% from some other races and 0.00% from two or more races. Hispanic or Latino people of any race were 3.11% of the population.

=== 2000 census ===
As of the 2000 census, there were 4,703 people, 1,690 households, and 1,308 families residing in the town. The population density was 219.77 inhabitants per square mile (84.85/km^{2}). There were 1,729 housing units at an average density of 80.79 per square mile (31.19/km^{2}). The racial makeup of the city was 97.15% White, 0.17% African American, 0.19% Native American, 1.45% Asian, 0.00% Pacific Islander, 0.40% from some other races and 0.64% from two or more races. Hispanic or Latino people of any race were 0.89% of the population.

There were 1,690 households, out of which 39.7% had children under the age of 18 living with them, 66.9% were married couples living together, 6.6% had a female householder with no husband present, and 22.6% were non-families. 15.9% of all households were made up of individuals, and 4.9% had someone living alone who was 65 years of age or older. The average household size was 2.78 and the average family size was 3.12.

In the town, the population was spread out, with 28.2% under the age of 18, 8.3% from 18 to 24, 31.7% from 25 to 44, 22.9% from 45 to 64, and 9.0% who were 65 years of age or older. The median age was 35 years. For every 100 females, there were 104.9 males. For every 100 females age 18 and over, there were 107.1 males.

The median income for a household in the town was $46,547, and the median income for a family was $52,220. Males had a median income of $35,313 versus $24,449 for females. The per capita income for the town was $17,523. About 3.6% of families and 6.5% of the population were below the poverty line, including 8.9% of those under age 18 and 6.9% of those age 65 or over.
