= Lake Hallie, Wisconsin =

- Village
- Location of Lake Hallie in Chippewa County, Wisconsin.

- Location within Wisconsin
- Coordinates: 44°53′31″N 91°25′12″W
- Country: United States
- State: Wisconsin
- Counties: Chippewa

Government
  - Type: Village board

Area
  - Total: 14.58 sq mi (37.77 km^{2})
  - Land: 14.14 sq mi (36.63 km^{2})
  - Water: 0.44 sq mi (1.14 km^{2})
- Elevation: 909 ft (277 m)

Population (2020)
  - Total: 7,170
  - Density: 507/sq mi (196/km^{2})
- Time zone: UTC-6 (CST)
  - Summer (DST): UTC-5 (CDT)
- Area codes: 715 & 534
- FIPS code: 55-41525
- GNIS feature ID: 2013447
- Website: Official website

Lake Hallie is a village in Chippewa County, Wisconsin, United States. It is part of the Eau Claire metropolitan area. It was incorporated from part of the town of Hallie on February 18, 2003. The 2020 census put the village's population at 7,170, up from 6,448 at the 2010 census.

== History ==
The lake, from which the village derives its name, is an oxbow lake near the Chippewa River between Eau Claire and Chippewa Falls. Here, in 1843, the McCann brothers joined with Jeremiah C. Thomas to build the Blue Mill, which used the lake as a holding pond for logs. Later, after several changes of ownership and many improvements, this mill was acquired by the Badger State Lumber Company and became known as Badger Mills. Its operations were discontinued in the 1890s due to a shortage of logs.

In an open effort to prevent further annexation and utility encroachment by the cities of Chippewa Falls from the northeast and Eau Claire from the southwest, the village was incorporated by referendum from a large portion of the town of Hallie on February 28, 2003. Over 95% of the town of Hallie's residents in 2000 lived within the new village. The village has experienced substantial growth since its incorporation; its 2010 population was 6,448, a 37.1% increase over the town of Hallie's 2000 population of 4,703.

== Geography ==
Lake Hallie is bordered on the north by Chippewa Falls, the south by Eau Claire and the town of Seymour, west by the Chippewa River, on the southeast by the Town of Hallie, and on the east by the town of Lafayette.

According to the United States Census Bureau, the village has a total area of 14.57 square miles (37.74 km^{2}), of which 14.09 square miles (36.49 km^{2}) is land and 0.48 square miles (1.24 km^{2}) water.

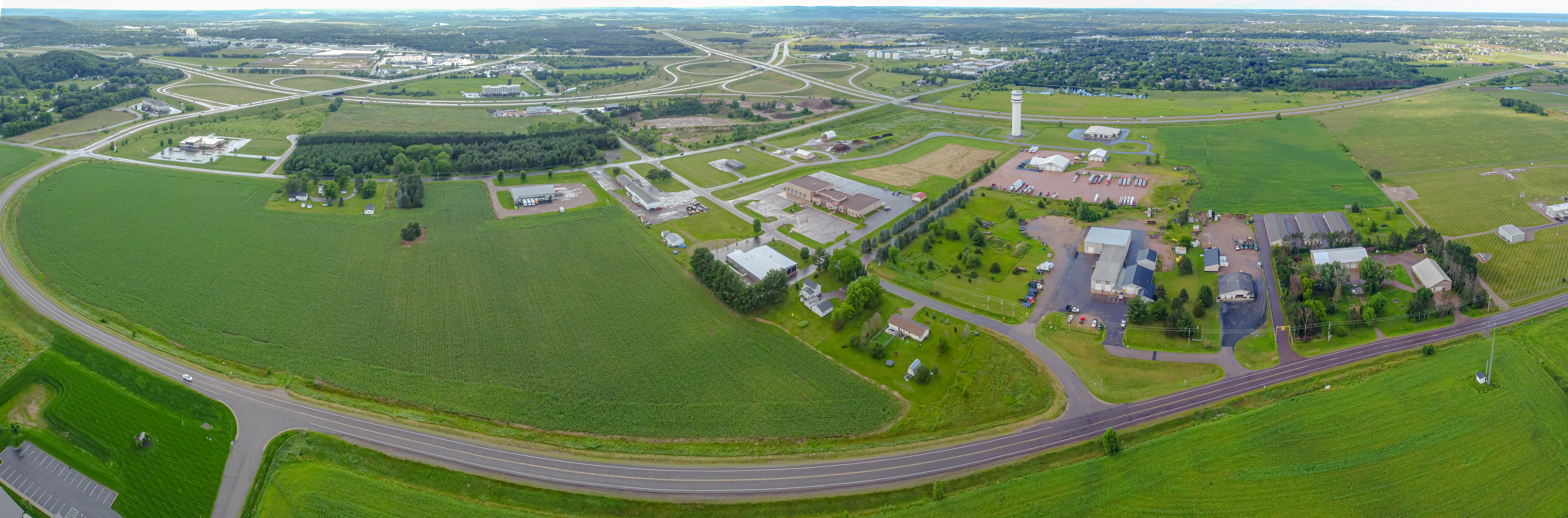

== Demographics ==
Historical population
Census	Pop.	Note	%±
2010	6,448		—
2020	7,170		11.2%
U.S. Decennial Census

=== 2010 census ===
As of the census of 2010, there were 6,448 people, 2,447 households, and 1,782 families residing in the village. The population density was 457.6 inhabitants per square mile (176.7/km^{2}). There were 2,554 housing units at an average density of 181.3 per square mile (70.0/km^{2}). The racial makeup of the village was 94.3% White, 0.6% African American, 0.6% Native American, 2.4% Asian, 0.5% from other races, and 1.5% from two or more races. Hispanic or Latino of any race were 1.7% of the population.

There were 2,447 households, of which 36.2% had children under the age of 18 living with them, 58.2% were married couples living together, 10.1% had a female householder with no husband present, 4.6% had a male householder with no wife present, and 27.2% were non-families. 20.2% of all households were made up of individuals, and 6.5% had someone living alone who was 65 years of age or older. The average household size was 2.62 and the average family size was 3.01.

The median age in the village was 35.3 years. 26.1% of residents were under the age of 18; 8% were between the ages of 18 and 24; 29.1% were from 25 to 44; 26.6% were from 45 to 64; and 10.1% were 65 years of age or older. The gender makeup of the village was 50.6% male and 49.4% female.

== Government ==
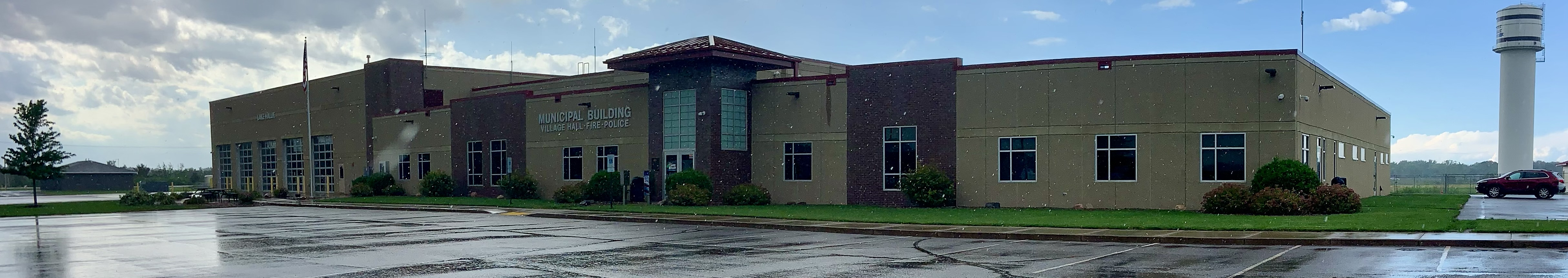
Village Hall

Lake Hallie is administered by a village board, consisting of trustees and a village president.

== Education ==
Lake Hallie is served by the Chippewa Falls Area Unified School District and the Eau Claire Area School District.

== Media ==
Hallie is part of the Eau Claire media market.

== Infrastructure ==
Lake Hallie is located at the intersection of two freeways: U.S. Route 53 and Wisconsin Highway 29. The Chippewa Valley Regional Airport borders the village to the south.

== Sports and recreation ==
Lake Hallie hosts an annual five-day baseball and softball tournament called Hallie Youth Days at the end of July. Tom Sippel Field is the home field for the Hallie Eagles, a baseball team in the Chippewa River Baseball League. The Eagles have won the CRBL championship three times, in 1984, 1996, and 2000, and have won the south division in the CRBL five times, and the North division once in 2009.

== Notable people ==
- Kathy Bernier, Wisconsin politician

== See also ==
- List of villages in Wisconsin
