= Lake Wissota, Wisconsin =

Census-designated place in Wisconsin, United States

- CDP
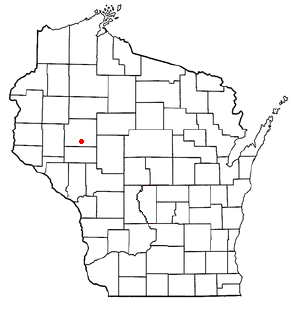
- Location of Lake Wissota, Wisconsin
- Coordinates: 44°55′34″N 91°18′45″W
- Country: United States
- State: Wisconsin
- County: Chippewa
- Town: Lafayette

Area
  - Total: 4.4 sq mi (11.5 km^{2})
  - Land: 3.8 sq mi (9.8 km^{2})
  - Water: 0.66 sq mi (1.7 km^{2})
- Elevation: 925 ft (282 m)

Population (2020)
  - Total: 2,830
  - Density: 750/sq mi (290/km^{2})
- Time zone: UTC-6 (Central (CST))
  - Summer (DST): UTC-5 (CDT)
- Area codes: 715 & 534
- FIPS code: 55-42025
- GNIS feature ID: 1567766

Lake Wissota is a census-designated place (CDP) in the town of Lafayette in Chippewa County in the U.S. state of Wisconsin. The population was 2,830 at the 2020 census. The CDP, known locally as Lake Wissota Village, is located along the southern shores of Lake Wissota.

== Geography ==
Lake Wissota is located at 44°55′34″N 91°18′45″W (44.926074, -91.312500).

According to the United States Census Bureau, the CDP has a total area of 4.4 square miles (11.5 km^{2}), of which 3.8 square miles (9.8 km^{2}) is land and 0.6 square mile (1.7 km^{2}) (14.67%) is water.

== Demographics ==
Historical population
Census	Pop.	Note	%±
1990	2,175		—
2000	2,458		13.0%
2010	2,738		11.4%
2020	2,830		3.4%

As of the census of 2000, there were 2,458 people, 966 households, and 711 families residing in the CDP. The population density was 650.0 people per square mile (251.1/km^{2}). There were 1,020 housing units at an average density of 269.7/sq mi (104.2/km^{2}). The racial makeup of the CDP was 98.49% White, 0.08% African American, 0.33% Native American, 0.49% Asian, 0.12% from other races, and 0.49% from two or more races. Hispanic or Latino of any race were 0.24% of the population.

There were 966 households, out of which 33.1% had children under the age of 18 living with them, 64.0% were married couples living together, 5.9% had a female householder with no husband present, and 26.3% were non-families. 18.7% of all households were made up of individuals, and 6.2% had someone living alone who was 65 years of age or older. The average household size was 2.54 and the average family size was 2.91.

In the CDP, the population was spread out, with 25.2% under the age of 18, 7.0% from 18 to 24, 29.3% from 25 to 44, 26.3% from 45 to 64, and 12.2% who were 65 years of age or older. The median age was 39 years. For every 100 females, there were 102.5 males. For every 100 females age 18 and over, there were 100.5 males.

The median income for a household in the CDP was $48,906, and the median income for a family was $62,120. Males had a median income of $35,526 versus $22,813 for females. The per capita income for the CDP was $23,851. About 0.6% of families and 3.0% of the population were below the poverty line, including 2.8% of those under age 18 and none of those age 65 or over.
