= Data Explorer =

Several software products and services are called Data Explorer:

- Azure Data Explorer
- Exoplanet Data Explorer
- Google Public Data Explorer
- Human Olfactory Data Explorer
- IBM OpenDX
- UNEP Environmental Data Explorer

Other uses:

- Data Explorers, a company
