= Phenotype (disambiguation) =

A phenotype is the set of observable characteristics or traits of an organism.

Phenotype may also refer to:

- Phenotype (igneous petrology), an aphanitic igneous rock which is identified and classified according to the mineralogy of its phenocrysts
- Phenotype (clinical medicine), the presentation of a disease
- Phenotype (album), a 2016 album by the band Textures

== See also ==
- Genotype, the set of genetic traits of an organism.
