= Abbotsford School District =

School in Abbotsford, Wisconsin, USA

Address
- 510 W Hemlock St Abbotsford, Wisconsin, 54405; United States

District information
- Grades: Pre-school - 12
- NCES District ID: 5500030

Students and staff
- District mascot: Falcons
- Colors

Other information
- Website: www.abbotsford.k12.wi.us

The Abbotsford School District is a public school district in Clark and Marathon counties, Wisconsin, United States, based in Abbotsford, Wisconsin.

In Clark County the district includes most of that county's part of Abbotsford, as well as Curtiss. There it includes sections of the towns of Mayville, Hoard, and Colby.

In Marathon County the district includes most of that county's part of Abbotsford. There it includes sections of the towns of Holton and Hull.

== Schools ==
The Abbotsford School District has one elementary school, one middle/senior high school and one alternative high school & education center.

Schools:

- Abbotsford Elementary School
- Abbotsford Middle/Senior High School
- Falcon Enterprises Alternative High School & Education Center
