= Mayones Guitars & Basses =

Guitar manufacturer based in Poland

- Company type: Private
- Industry: Musical instruments
- Founded: 1982; 44 years ago
- Headquarters: Gdańsk, Poland
- Area served: Worldwide
- Products: Electric guitars, basses
- Website: mayones.com

Mayones Guitars & Basses, established in 1982, is a manufacturer of electric guitars and bass guitars, located in Gdańsk, Poland. They specialize in building handcrafted and custom instruments.

== Basic Models ==
=== Guitars ===
- Aquila

- Regius

- Duvell

- Legend

- Hydra

==== Discontinued ====
- Vidius
- Maestro
- Virtuoso
- Setius

=== Bass guitars ===
- Jabba

- Caledonius

- Comodus

- Patriot

- Cali

==== Discontinued ====
- BE
- Elegance
- Prestige
- Slogan
- Victorious
- Viking

== Mayones Artists ==
Some notable artists that use/have used Mayone instruments now and in the past:

- Aaron Marshall (Intervals)
- Acle Kahney (Tesseract)
- Adel Rouhnavaz (Acrovaya)
- Alber Sanmiguel (Enki)
- Anders Nyström (Katatonia & Bloodbath)
- Andrew Craighan (My Dying Bride)
- Andy Slade (Collapse, Echovirus)
- Adam Christianson (ARCHITECTS)
- Adam Zieliński (JAMUN, War Within)
- Aaron Aedy (Paradise Lost)
- Amadeus Awad (Amadeus Awad & Amadeus Awad's EON)
- Ali Dean (ARCHITECTS)
- Alex Mauric (I Vs. I)
- Bart Hennephof (Textures)
- Brian van Zwietering (Dr.Jekyll)
- Cristian Giurgiu (Tableau Mort)
- Daniel Antonsson (Dark Tranquillity)
- Daniel Gildenlöw (Pain of Salvation)
- Dennis Notebaart (Yellow)
- Dmitry Porubov (Психея)
- Eric Hazebroek (Stream of Passion)
- Fiachra Kelly (Xerosun)
- Federico Malaman
- Gareth Jeffs (Xerosun)
- Gregor Mackintosh (Paradise Lost)
- Hadrien Feraud
- Hugo Markaida (Rise to Fall)
- Jakob Batten (Illdisposed)
- Jakub Zytecki (ex-DispersE)
- Jeroen van Veen (Within Temptation)
- Jil Y. Creek
- Jimmy Haslip (Yellowjackets)
- Jochem Jacobs (ex-Textures)
- Juan Tides (Pervy Perkin)
- Johan Edlund (Tiamat)
- John Browne (Monuments)
- Jon Schaeffer (Traverser)
- Jonas Renkse (Katatonia, Bloodbath)
- John Paul Jones (Led Zeppelin, Them Crooked Vultures)
- Keshav Dhar (Skyharbor)
- Kristoffer Gildenlöw
- Lena Abé (My Dying Bride)
- Leo Tomasz Dorsz (Red Seas Fire)
- Leslie Jhonson
- Mark Brekelmans (Selfmachine)
- Michael Chirva (Tvangeste)
- Mick Gordon
- Misha Mansoor (Periphery)
- Micael Svan (Myrah)
- Mohini Dey
- Niilo Sevänen (Insomnium)
- Niklas Sandin (Katatonia)
- Niklas Sundin (Dark Tranquillity)
- Paul Jackson (T'Pau)
- Per Eriksson (Katatonia & Bloodbath)
- Patrick Sheridan (Fit For An Autopsy)
- Paul Notebaart (Dr.Jekyll)
- Peter "PeteyG" Graves (Red Seas Fire, CAGE)
- Piotr Grudziński (Riverside)
- Pontus Hjelm (Dead by April)
- Prashant Shah (Scribe (band))
- Roger Williams
- Ruud Adrianus Jolie (Within Temptation)
- Ryan Siew (Solo/Polaris)
- Rick Sschneider (Polaris)
- Scott Kay (Voyager)
- Sylvain Coudret (Soilwork, Scarve)
- Shaun Murphy (The Summoned)
- Sergey Mavrin (Ария)
- Stephan Schultz (Stream of Passion)
- Sithu Aye
- Ville Friman (Insomnium)
- Viacheslav Kocharin (Психея)
- Thorsten Geschwandtner (Nump)
- Tom Searle (Architects)
- Wojtek Pilichowski (Woobie Doobie)
- Wes Borland (Limp Bizkit)
