= Ordu (disambiguation) =

Ordu may refer to:

== Places ==
- Ordu, a city at Black Sea coast in northern Turkey
- Ordu-Baliq, an ancient city and the capital of the first Uyghur Khaganate
- Ordu Province, a province with its central seat Ordu in Turkey
- Yayladağı, historically known as Ordu, a town in southern Turkey

== Other uses ==
- Urdu, an Indo-Aryan language
- Ja Ordu, a village in Qilab Rural District, Alvar-e Garmsiri District, Andimeshk County, Khuzestan
- Eski Ordu Marsi, an Ottoman military march
- Orduspor, a sport club in Ordu, Turkey
- Ordu Boztepe Gondola, an aerial lift line in Ordu, Turkey
- Ordu Giresun Airport, an airport under construction in Gülyalı town in Ordu Province, Turkey
- Ordu FC, a football team in Afghanistan
- Ordu Nefise Akçelik Tunnel, a highway tunnel in Ordu, Turkey
- Ordu University, a university in Ordu, Turkey

== See also ==
- Orda (disambiguation)
