= Hordes =

Hordes may refer to:

- Social and military structures of nomadic Turkic peoples in the Middle Ages; see:
  - Golden Horde
  - Mongol and Tatar states in Europe
- The miniature war game Hordes (game)

== See also ==
- Horde (disambiguation)
