= Genotype (album) =

Studio album by Textures
- Released: 23 January 2026
- Studios: Creative Music Lab (Tilburg) (Note: Guitars, bass, and vocals recording); Artichoque (Tilburg) (Note: Drums recording); OTown (Oegstgeest) (Note: Keyboards, effects, samples, orchestra, and percussion recording)
- Genres: Progressive metalcore; djent
- Length: 45:45
- Label: Kscope
- Producer: Bart Hennephof

Textures chronology
Phenotype (2016)	Genotype (2026)

Professional ratings
Review scores
Source	Rating
Boolin Tunes	7/10
Dead Rhetoric	9/10
Distorted Sound	9/10
New Noise Magazine	4/5 stars

Genotype is the sixth studio album by the Dutch progressive metalcore band Textures. It was released on 23 January 2026 via Kscope. Music videos were released for "Closer to the Unknown" and "At the Edge of Winter", the latter featuring former Delain vocalist Charlotte Wessels.

Genotype was originally the title of an album recorded together with their previous album Phenotype (2016), but the original album was shelved due to the band's split-up from 2017 to 2023. The title was since reused for a new album entirely written from scratch while still serving as the conceptual counterpart to Phenotype, leaving material from the previous Genotype recording session unused.

== Track listing ==
All tracks are written by Textures.

Genotype track listing
No.	Title	Length
1.	"Void"	3:46
2.	"At the Edge of Winter" (featuring Charlotte Wessels)	6:42
3.	"Measuring the Heavens"	6:51
4.	"Nautical Dusk"	5:39
5.	"Vanishing Twin"	5:49
6.	"Closer to the Unknown"	4:06
7.	"A Seat for the Like-Minded"	5:01
8.	"Walls of the Soul"	7:51
Total length:		45:45

== Personnel ==
Credits are adapted from the album's liner notes.

=== Textures ===
- Daniël de Jongh – vocals
- Bart Hennephof – guitars, production, engineering
- Joe Tal – guitars
- Remko Tielemans – bass guitar, cover artwork, album layout
- Uri Dijk – keyboards, co-production, engineering
- Stef Broks – drums

=== Additional contributors ===
- Charlotte Wessels – guest vocals on "At the Edge of Winter"
- Forrester Savell – mixing, mastering
- Eric Kalsbeek – cover artwork
- Ben de Jong – photography
- Jo Bouwmeester – violin on "Void", cello on "Measuring the Heavens"
- Erik van Ittersum – orchestral arrangement on "Measuring the Heavens"
