= Hoard (disambiguation) =

A hoard is a collection of valuable objects or artifacts, sometimes purposely buried in the ground.

Hoard may also refer to:

== Places ==
- Hoard, West Virginia, an unincorporated community in Monongalia County, West Virginia, United States
- Hoard, Wisconsin, a town in Clark County, Wisconsin, United States

== People ==
- Hoard (surname)

== Arts, entertainment, and media ==
- Hoard (video game), a 2010 action-strategy video game developed by Big Sandwich Games
- Hoard's Dairyman, a dairy industry magazine
- Hoard (film), a British film

== Other uses ==
- Hoard memory allocator, a memory allocator for Linux, Solaris, Microsoft Windows and other operating systems

== See also ==
- Hoarding (disambiguation)
- Horde (disambiguation)
