= Hord =

Hord is a surname. Notable people with the surname include:

- Brian Hord (1934–2015), British surveyor and politician
- Chad Hord (born 1976), American racing driver
- Donal Hord (1902–1966), American sculptor
- Noel Hord (1946-2026), American businessman
- Oscar B. Hord (1829–1888), American politician and lawyer
- Roy Hord Jr. (1934–2002), American football player

== See also ==
- Horde (disambiguation)
- Hoard (disambiguation)
