= Jochem Jacobs =

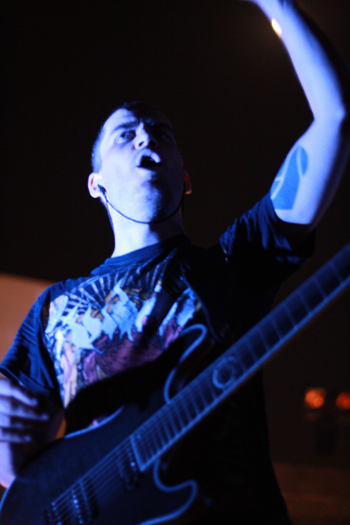
- Guitarist Jochem Jacobs live with Textures in 2010

Background information
- Born: Jochem Jacobs; 26 March 1977 (age 48)
- Genres: Technical metal, progressive metal
- Occupation(s): Musician, producer
- Instrument: Guitar
- Labels: Nuclear Blast; Listenable Records
- Formerly of: Textures
- Website: www.splitsecondsound.nl

Jochem Jacobs (born 26 March 1977) is a Dutch guitarist, producer and recording engineer, noted for his work as founder, guitarist and producer for Textures. He works at Split Second Sound, a studio in Amsterdam, Netherlands. He has been involved with the mixing, mastering and production of all Textures albums so far, as well as other bands such as Epica, Autumn, Stream of Passion, Heidevolk, Severe Torture, Hord, In-Quest, Almah, Izegrim, The Red Shore, Intwine, Face Tomorrow, Kingfisher Sky and Devious. He is endorsed by Mayones guitars.

He played with his brother Sander in the Dutch crossover metal band Ground Control from 1995 to 2001, and released 2 demos and one album.

About the recordings of Texture's Dualism album, he said:

It’s all really exciting! This album is really going to express where and what we are these days…and that’s a good thing. We’ve been through a lot lately, especially the last year. Now with some new air and fresh ideas, we finally reached the point that we are actually quite confident in the new material..Sometimes you just have to crawl through the mud first to get to dry grounds. We are in the middle of the preproduction now, getting our asses in gear to create this baby. It’s kinda cool to see this band grow more and more and to continue this musical journey that we’ve been on for 10 years! Let’s make this thing heavy!!!

== Equipment ==
- Mayones Guitars
- Peavey 5150

== Discography ==
=== With Ground Control ===
- The Infamous $50 Tape (1995)
- Access 2 Control (1996)
- God-Mode (1998)

=== With Textures ===
- Polars (2003)
- Drawing Circles (2006)
- Silhouettes (2008)
- Dualism (2011)
