= Stef Broks =

Dutch drummer (born 1981)

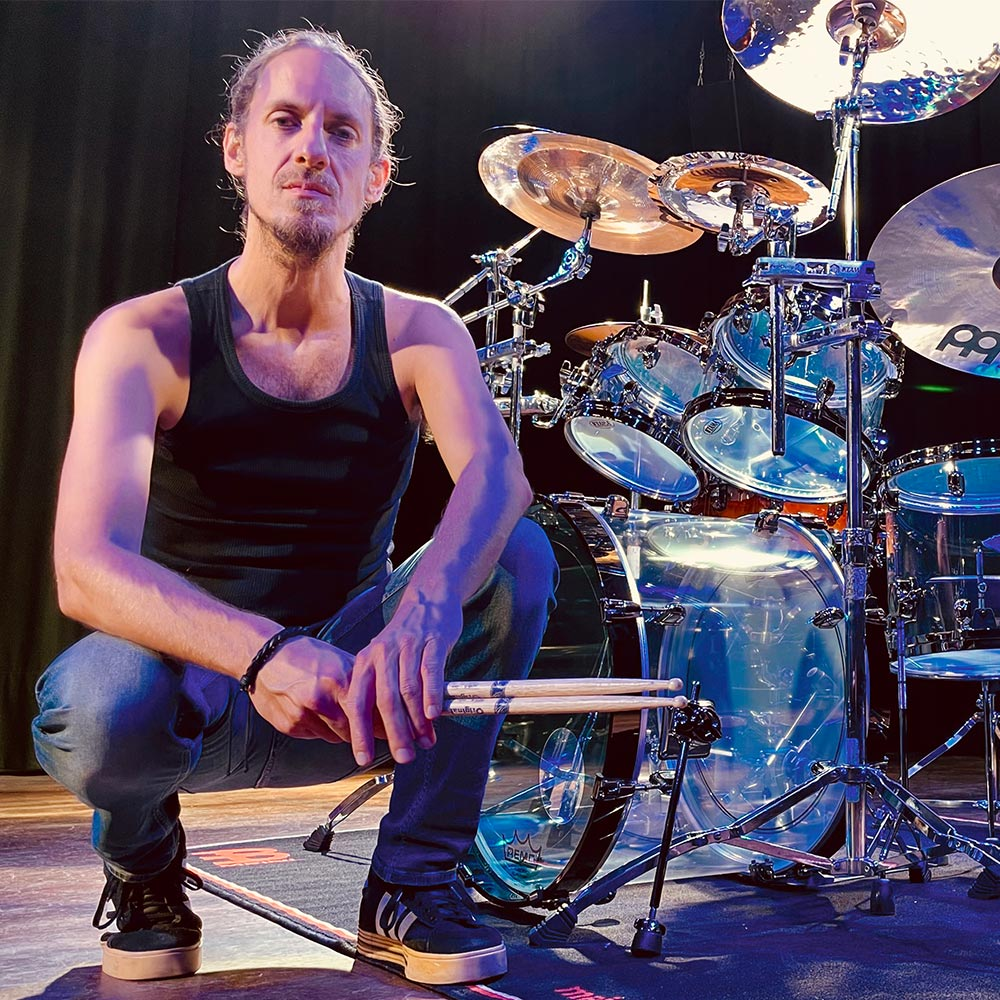

Background information
- Genres: Progressive rock Progressive Metal; Jazz Fusion
- Occupations: Musician, Teacher, Entrepreneur, journalist
- Instruments: Drums, vocals
- Years active: 2001–present
- Member of: Textures Zeitwende

Stef Broks (born May 1, 1981) is a Dutch musician, teacher and entrepreneur, best known for his work with Dutch progressive metal band Textures. Sick Drummer Magazine described his style as rock and metal with a fusion touch and an extensive use of polyrhythms.

Broks currently has his own music school, Het Popstation, in Utrecht and teaches at Codarts as well as various courses at Metal Factory, Eindhoven.

== Musical career ==
Broks was born in Etten-Leur, The Netherlands.

After playing in several local bands as a teenager, Broks asked guitarist Jochem Jacobs in 2001 to start a band in the style of modern metal acts such as Meshuggah, Devin Townsend, and At the Gates. Broks suggested the band name Textures, derived from the title of an instrumental track on the 1993 album Focus by progressive metal band Cynic.

While Broks was studying journalism and working for newspapers and magazines (Slagwerkkrant, Gitarist, Musicmaker) in his early 20s, Textures enjoyed overnight success after the Dutch music magazines Oor and Aardschok called their self-released debut, Polars, one of the best Dutch metal albums ever. Textures became also one of the first D.I.Y.-acts in The Netherlands with working out artwork, band management, building a studio, album production and videoclips all by themselves. The album was picked up by Listenable Records (Soilwork, Gojira) a few months later and released to a worldwide audience.

From 2003 until 2017, Broks and Textures played up to 700 shows across Europe, U.S.A. and India with bands like Arch Enemy, Meshuggah, Tesseract and Gojira, including slots on major metal festivals in Europe. Broks graduated from his studies Journalism (2000-2004) and conservatorium Codarts Rotterdam (2004-2008) later on. Broks was awarded Best Metal Drummer five times by Dutch/Belgian drum magazine Slagwerkkrant, followed by dozens of drum clinics and workshops in The Netherlands, Spain, Belgium and Nepal.

After a seven-year hiatus, Textures returned in 2024 with a festival tour across the main European metal festivals. The band also returned to writing the never-released successor of Phenotype.

Artists like Chris Adler (Lamb of God), Jay Postones (Tesseract), Kerim "Krimh" Lechner (Decapitated, Septicflesh) and Matt Halpern (Periphery) name Broks as one of their drum inspirations.

== Teaching ==
After making his teaching debut at the age of 18 years old at Mark Eeftens Drum School in Breda, Broks worked at:

- Music Station, Rotterdam (together with Cesar Zuiderwijk)
- Popcentrale music school, Dordrecht
- Herman Brood Academie, Utrecht
- Rock City Institute, Eindhoven.

Broks founded his own music school, Het Popstation, in Utrecht in 2014. Broks also works at conservatorium Codarts Rotterdam and Metal Factory Eindhoven since 2014, where he does band coaching, didactics/pedagogics and drum lessons.

Broks is working on a drum method, to be released in 2025.

== Equipment ==
Broks uses Meinl cymbals and Tama drums and drumsticks.

- Tama Starclassic drum set
- Tama Speed Cobra Double Pedal
- Meinl 13" Byzance Traditional hi-hat
- Meinl 17" Soundcaster Custom Medium Crash
- Meinl 14" Soundcaster Custom Medium Crash
- Meinl 16" Soundcaster Custom China
- Meinl 12" Soundcaster Custom Splash
- Meinl 16" Soundcaster Custom Medium Crash
- Meinl 20" Mb10 Medium Ride

== Discography ==
- Textures – Polars (2003)
- Textures – Drawing Circles (2006)
- Textures – Silhouettes (2008)
- Exivious – Exivious (2009)
- Zhabareth – Zhabareth (2009)
- Cube X – Kanzi's Word List (2011)
- Textures – Dualism (2011)
- Maiden United – Remembrance (2015)
- Textures – Phenotype (2016)
