= Hoarding (disambiguation) =

Hoarding is the gathering and storing of goods.

Hoarding may also refer to:

== Animal and human behavior ==
- Hoarding (animal behaviour), an animal behaviour related to storing surplus goods for later use
- Hoarding (economics), the practice of obtaining and holding resources in quantities greater than needed for one's immediate use
- Hoarding disorders
  - Hoarding disorder, a pathological hoarding by humans
    - Animal hoarding, the compulsive hoarding of animals by humans

== Arts, entertainment, and media ==
- Hoarding: Buried Alive, an American reality television series (2010-2013) that premiered on TLC
- Hoarders (TV series), an American reality television series airing on A&E

== Structures ==
- Hoarding (castle), a roofed wooden shield placed over castle battlements
- Billboard, known also as a hoarding in some countries
- Temporary fencing enclosing a construction site

== See also ==
- Hoard (disambiguation)
