= Rendezvous (festival) =

Annual cultural festival of IIT Delhi

Rendezvous, IIT Delhi
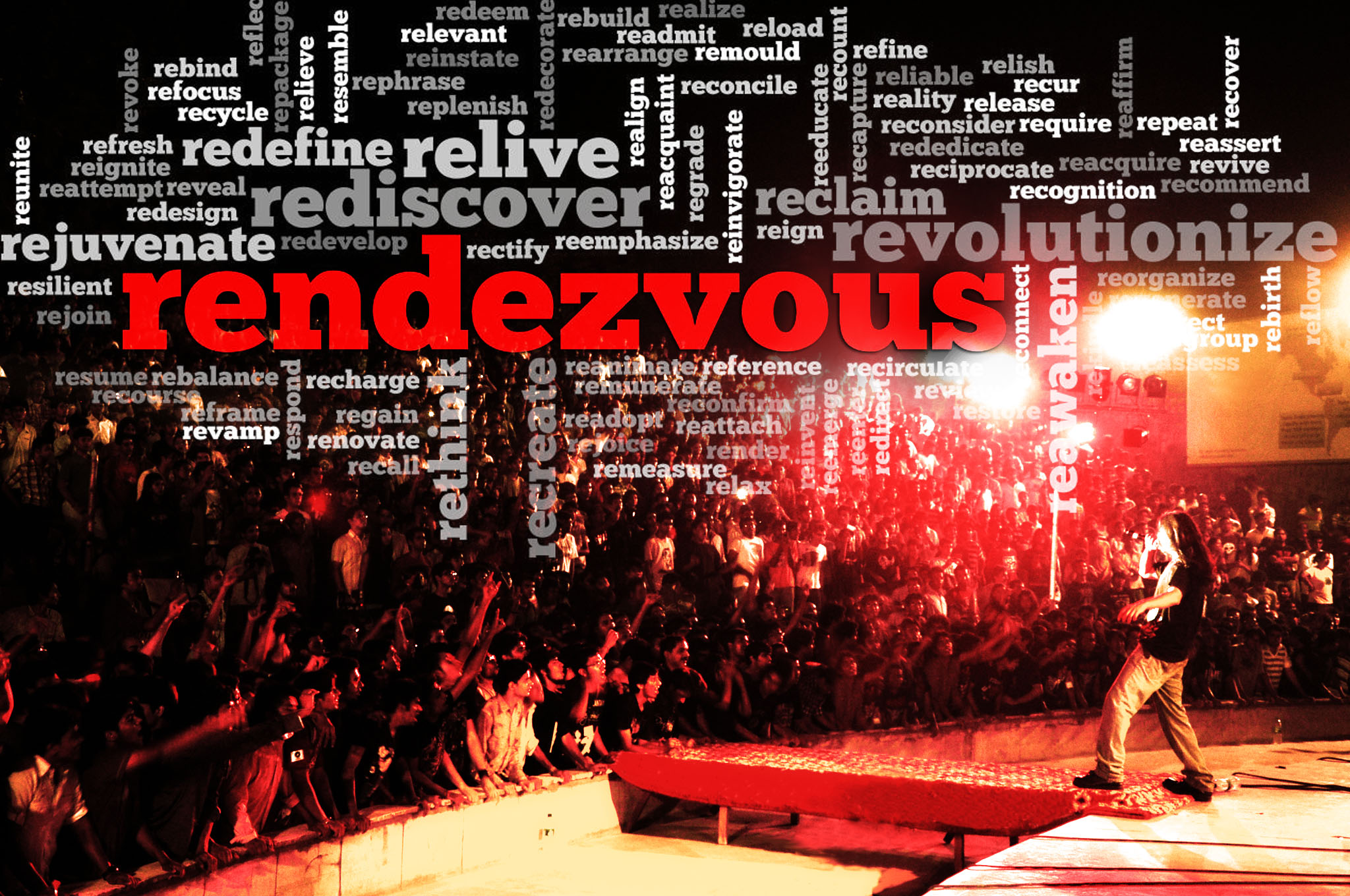
- Genre: Cultural
- Dates: 27 - 30 September, 2025
- Frequency: Annual
- Venue: Indian Institute of Technology Delhi (IIT)
- Location: New Delhi
- Country: India
- Inaugurated: 1976; 50 years ago
- Organiser: Board for Recreational & Creative Activities (BRCA), IIT Delhi
- Website: www.rdv-iitd.org

Rendezvous, known as "The RDV," is the flagship cultural festival of the Indian Institute of Technology Delhi (IIT Delhi). Taking place September 27 to September 30, 2025(It usually happens at the end of September or the beginning of October), this event transcends academia, attracting students from 1200+ colleges and welcoming a staggering 160,000+ attendees. It's a celebration of culture, art, and talent like no other, showcasing creativity and innovation at its finest.

== Events ==
Rendezvous, in its every edition, hosts a large number of competitional and non-competitional events engaging a nationwide participation. Faces of RDV(formerly known as Mr. & Mrs. RDV), Fashion Show, Comedy Hunt, Blitzkrieg Beatbox Battle, Rap Battle, Chess Tournament, Lifestyle, Chef's Art, Meme Fest, Valorant Tournament, Deguise (a cosplay event), FIFA Tournament, BGMI Tournament, COD Tournament, Stratazenith, Film Festival are a few to name the mega flagship events. Apart from these, a variety of competitions, workshops and talk sessions are organised by the respective cultural clubs of IIT Delhi namely Dance Club, Debating Club, Design Club, Dramatics Club, Fine Arts and Crafts Club, Hindi Samiti, Literary Club, Music Club, Photography and Films Club, Spic Macay, Quizzing Club.

== Pronites ==
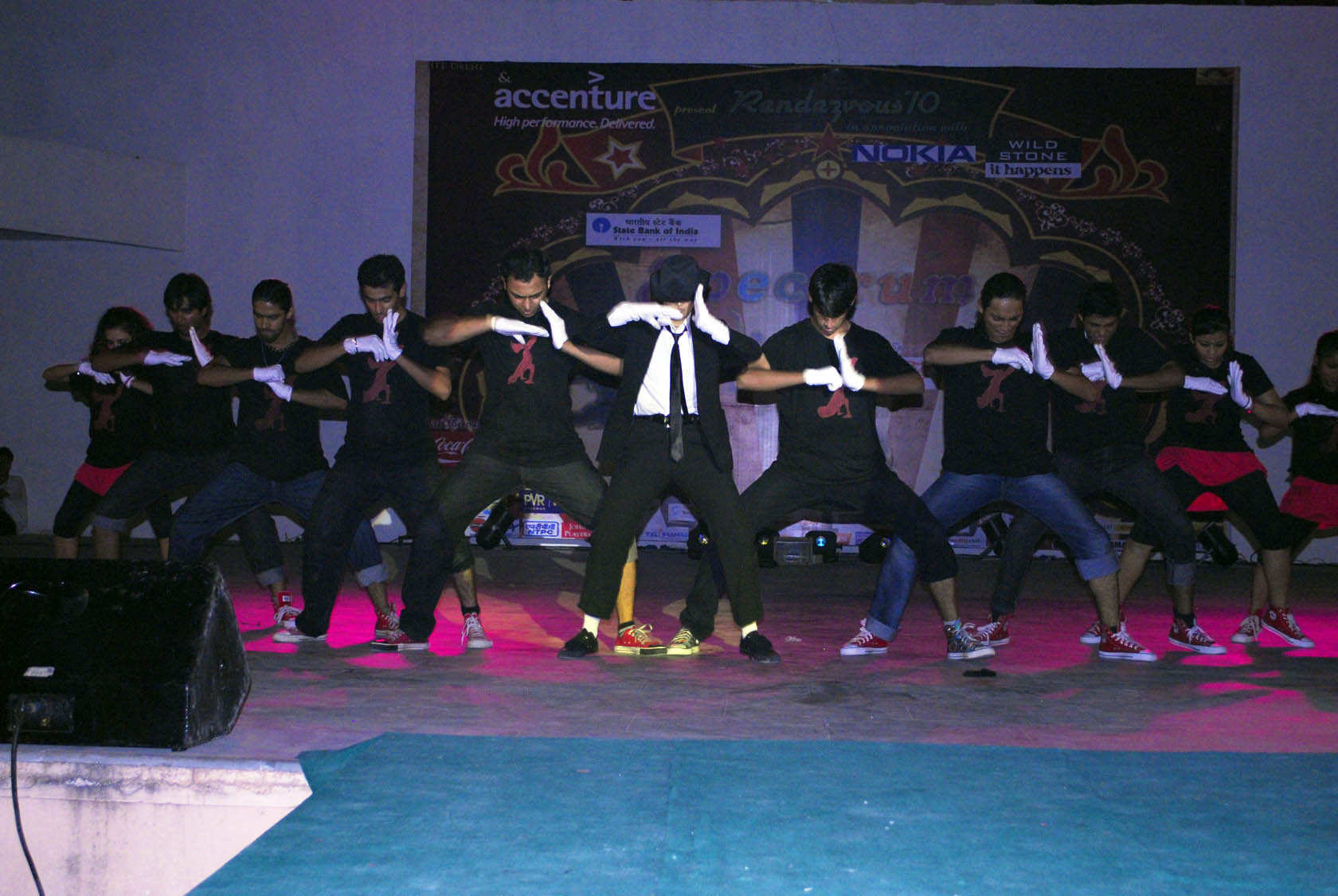
Spectrum, the Group Dance Competition

Following each eventful day at Rendezvous, Pronite brings out artists from various cultures together on a stage. It has been the main star attraction of the festival with performing artists ranging from the famous Indian musical trio, Shankar-Ehsaan-Loy to the famous American Rock Band, Hoobastank, having performed here. Dhoom, in the past has staged popular performances like Nucleya, Guru Randhawa and Sonu Nigam in 2023 earlier edition of March, Sunidhi Chauhan, Salim-Sulaiman and Benny Dayal in 2022, Shankar Ehsaan Loy, Amit Trivedi and Ritviz in 2019 Javed Akhtar, Shankar Mahadevan, Ehsaan Noorani and Loy Medonsa, Javed Ali in 2015, Falak Shabir and Arjit Singh in 2014, Farhan Akhtar, Hoobastank in 2013, Coke Studio@MTV (Papon, Shilpa Rao and Advaita Band) in 2012; Rabbi Shergill, Rohit Deshmukh, Kailash Kher, Amaan and Ayaan Ali Khan, Mohit Chauhan, KK in 2010. The Pro-Show Spectrum has maintained the legacy of hosting star casts of popular Bollywood movies like Chakravyuh (Arjun Rampal, Abhay Deol, Manoj Bajpai, Esha Gupta) in 2012, Band Baaja Baaraat (Anushka Sharma, Ranveer Singh) and Break Ke Baad (Deepika Padukone, Imran Khan) in 2010. Blitzkrieg has staged several international headliner bands like Cypher16 in 2012, Textures in 2010, Malefice in 2009, and Mindsnare in 2008; and Indian Rock Bands like Parikrama.

Apart from competitions, some of the Indian top bands are also invited to perform. 2016 witnessed the presence of the Junkyard Groove and Spud in the Box. These have been judged by prominent judges like Shiamak Davar (Choreography Competition 2012) and Shahnaz Husain (Fashion Show 2015).

== Programs ==
=== Influencer Program ===
The Influencer Program by Rendezvous IIT Delhi is designed to empower social media influencers of all follower counts and provide them with a platform to showcase their skills and gain recognition. Participants in this program have the opportunity to earn a range of benefits, from cash prizes and exciting goodies to exclusive callouts during Pronites.

=== Campus Ambassador Program ===
The Campus Ambassador Program is an opportunity for individuals to represent IIT Delhi on social media platforms. Rendezvous IIT Delhi has reintroduced its Campus Ambassador Program, offering a chance to enhance marketing and publicity skills.

== Other performances ==
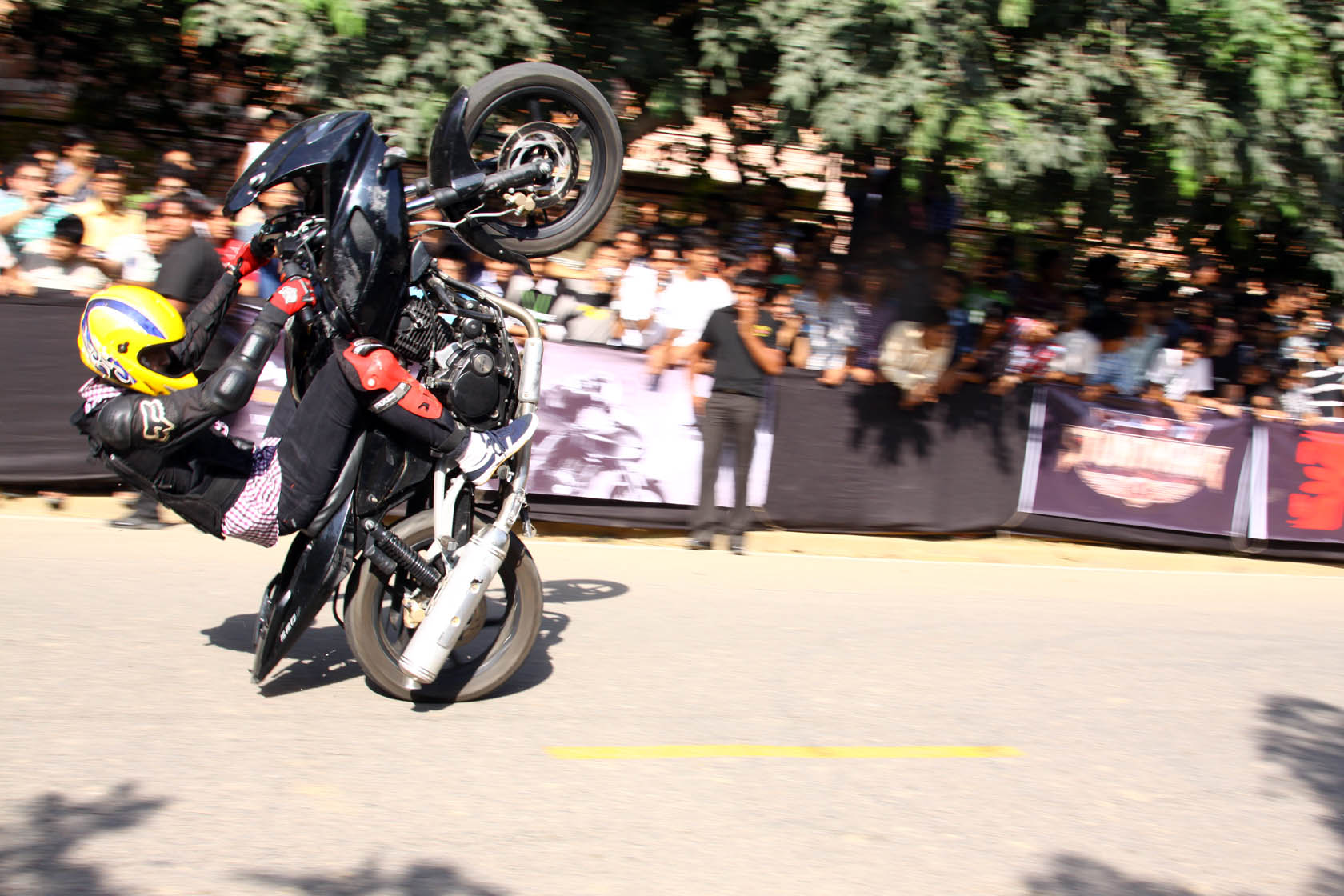
The Stunt Mania in 2010

Informal stages are set up on the streets of IIT Delhi to attract and engage with the passers-by. They host informal events throughout the four days of the festival. In the past, they have seen the presence of Bollywood personalities including Anushka Sharma, John Abraham, Deepika Padukone and Piyush Mishra.

The commencement of the "RDV’s Got talent" has given students a platform to showcase their skills.

Live stages are also put up near the main institute area of IIT Delhi, where professional artist from all across the nation showcase their talent in front of the crowd of RDV.

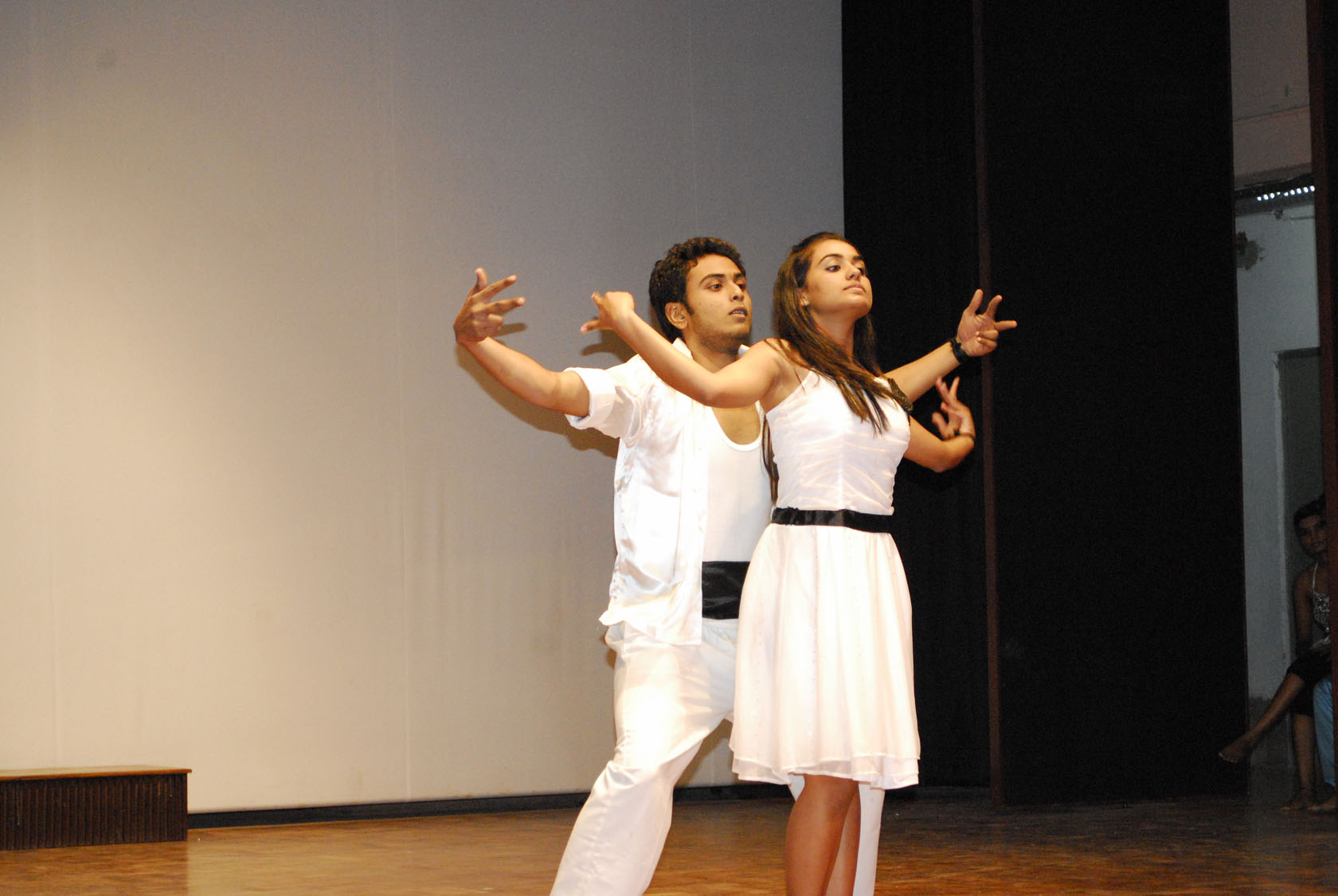
Duo Dance Competition
