= Polars (album) =

Studio album by Textures
- Released: August 25, 2003; September 28, 2004 (Re-release); October 20, 2014 (Remaster)
- Genre: Progressive metalcore
- Length: 57:50
- Label: Listenable; Nuclear Blast (reissue)
- Producer: Textures

Textures chronology
Polars (2003)	Drawing Circles (2006)

10th Anniversary Special Edition

Professional ratings
Review scores
Source	Rating
AllMusic	3/5 stars

Polars is the debut studio album by Dutch progressive metalcore band Textures. It was released on August 25, 2003, by Listenable Records. The album was recorded, produced, mixed and mastered by the band themselves. The label re-issued the album in 2004 with slightly different cover art (adding images of machinery and gears) and in some cases, a different casing.

The album contains eight songs, the sixth and eighth of which are wholly ambient with assorted sound effects. It is their only album featuring vocalist Pieter Verpaalen, who was replaced by Eric Kalsbeek for their second release.

The enhanced CD also features the music video for "Ostensibly Impregnable".

== Track listing ==
No.	Title	Length
1.	"Swandive"	5:09
2.	"Ostensibly Impregnable"	3:21
3.	"Young Man"	3:59
4.	"Transgression"	4:20
5.	"The Barrier"	2:55
6.	"Effluent"	3:12
7.	"Polars"	18:25
8.	"Heave" (two and a half minutes of silence at the end removed in re-release)	17:04
Total length:		57:50

== Personnel ==
Textures

- Jochem Jacobs - guitars, backing vocals
- Stef Broks - drums
- Dennis Aarts - bass guitar
- Bart Hennephof - guitars, backing vocals
- Pieter Verpaalen - lead vocals
- Richard Rietdijk - synthesizer, keyboards

Production

- Jochem Jacobs - recording, mixing, mastering
- Richard Rietdijk - recording, mixing
- Bart Hennephof - artwork, layout
