= Africa Environment Outlook for Youth =

United Nations Environment Programme project

Africa Environment Outlook for Youth, also known as AEO for Youth, was a United Nations Environment Programme (UNEP) project that established Africa's first ever youth environmental network. This network worked with young people from at least 41 African countries and mobilised them to write a youth-oriented book known as AEO for Youth. The book captured the views and perspectives of young people from all over Africa.

== History ==
During UNEP's Global Youth Retreat (GYR) 2003, held at the UNEP Headquarters in Nairobi, the African caucus endorsed a proposal to develop a youth version of the Africa Environment Outlook (AEO). AEO for Youth targeted young people between the ages of 16 and 30. It updated and highlighted the main AEO environmental themes in a way that was interesting, attractive and appealing to youth in Africa.

The resultant product was an image-intensive book that was launched at the Africa Ministerial Conference on the Environment in Congo Brazzaville, in 2006. The AEO for Youth Project was led by David Bwakali together with sub-regional coordinators from all of Africa's six sub-regions.
