= Dualism (album) =

Studio album by Textures
- Released: 23 September 2011
- Studio: Split Second
- Genres: Progressive metalcore; djent
- Length: 56:41
- Label: Nuclear Blast
- Producer: Jochem Jacobs

Textures chronology
Silhouettes (2008)	Dualism (2011)	Phenotype (2016)

Singles from Dualism
- 1. "Reaching Home" Released: 19 August 2011

Dualism is the fourth studio album by the Dutch progressive metalcore band Textures. It was released on 23 September 2011 in Europe, South America and Asia, and was released in North America on 27 September, all via Nuclear Blast Records.

The first single from the album "Reaching Home" was released on 19 August worldwide. A music video was released simultaneously with the song. That same day, drummer Stef Broks released a video through SickDrummer.com of himself playing along to the entire new track titled "Singularity".

The album was produced by guitarist Jochem Jacobs and it was recorded in Split Second Sound Studio in Amsterdam, Netherlands. The artwork for the album was designed by former vocalist Eric Kalsbeek and bassist Remko Tielemans.

== Track listing ==
All music and lyrics written, arranged, and composed by Textures.

Dualism track listing
No.	Title	Length
1.	"Arms of the Sea"	6:33
2.	"Black Horses Stampede"	3:56
3.	"Reaching Home"	5:10
4.	"Sanguine Draws the Oath"	5:51
5.	"Consonant Hemispheres"	4:20
6.	"Burning the Midnight Oil"	5:39
7.	"Singularity"	6:46
8.	"Minor Earth, Major Skies"	4:40
9.	"Stoic Resignation"	5:08
10.	"Foreclosure" (instrumental)	2:56
11.	"Sketches from a Motionless Statue"	5:21
Total length:		56:20

== Personnel ==
Credits are adapted from the album's liner notes.

=== Textures ===
- Stef Broks – drums
- Daniël de Jongh – vocals
- Jochem Jacobs – guitars, production, recording, mixing, mastering
- Bart Hennephof – guitars, co-production
- Uri Dijk – synthesizers
- Remko Tielemans – bass guitar, artwork

=== Additional contributor ===
- Eric Kalsbeek – artwork
