= Horde =

Horde may refer to:

== History ==
- Orda (organization), a historic sociopolitical and military structure in steppe nomad cultures such as the Turks and Mongols
  - Golden Horde, a Turkic-Mongol state established in the 1240s
  - Wings of the Golden Horde, also known as White, Blue and Gray Hordes, formed in 1226 and 1227
  - Great Horde, a remnant of the Golden Horde from about 1466 until 1502
  - Nogai Horde, a Turkic clan situated in the Caucasus Mountain region, formed in the 1390s
- Eurasian nomads generally
- a historical term for band society, the simplest form of human society, in anthropology

== Film and television ==
- The Horde (She-Ra), a group of fictional characters in She-Ra: Masters of the Universe and She-Ra: Princesses of Power media
- The Horde (2009 film), a French film
- The Horde (2012 film), a Russian historical film
- The Horde, 23 prominent personalities in the character Kevin Wendell Crumb in the 2016 American film Split
- The Horde, a fictional Aryan motorcycle gang in the television series The Shield

== Music ==
- Horde (band), an unblack metal project of Australian musician Jayson Sherlock
- H.O.R.D.E., a music festival in the United States
- Horde (album), a 1981 album by Mnemonist Orchestra

== Video games ==
- Horde, one of the factions in the Warcraft universe
- Locust Horde, the main enemy faction of the Gears of War franchise
- The Horde (video game), a 1994 action-strategy video game

== Other uses ==
- Horde (software), a web application framework of various applications including an email client
- Great Dark Horde, a group within the Society for Creative Anachronism modeled on an idealized version of Mongol culture
- Horde (comics), several characters and a species used in Marvel Comics
- Hörde, a quarter of the city of Dortmund, Germany
- Human Olfactory Data Explorer (HORDE), a database of human olfactory receptors
- The Horde (boxed set), an accessory for the Advanced Dungeons & Dragons fantasy role-playing game
- Horde chess, a variant of Dunsany's chess

== See also ==
- Hoard (disambiguation)
- Orda (disambiguation)
- Ordu (disambiguation)
- Army
- Clan
- Nomadic pastoralism, a form of agriculture practiced by steppe nomads
