= Hoard (surname) =

Hoard is a surname. Notable people with the surname include:

- Charles B. Hoard (1805–1886), U.S. Representative from New York
- Greg Hoard (1951/52–2025), American journalist and author
- James L. Hoard (1905–1993), American chemist, a member of the Manhattan Project
- Jaylen Hoard (born 1999), French-American basketball player
- Leroy Hoard (born 1968), American football running back
- Samuel Hoard (1599–1658), English clergyman and controversialist in the Arminian interest
- Samuel Hoard (politician) (1800–1889), American politician
- William D. Hoard (1836–1918), 16th Governor of the U.S. state of Wisconsin
