= Textures (band) =

Dutch progressive metalcore band

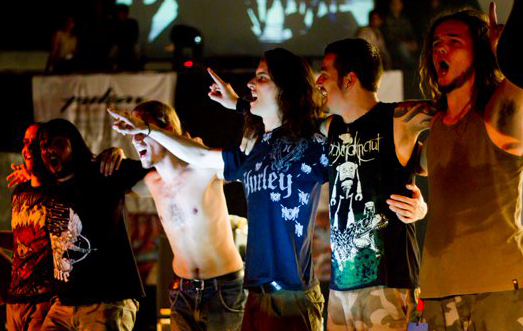
- From left to right: Jochem Jacobs, Daniel de Jongh, Stef Broks, Uri Dijk, Remko Tielemans and Bart Hennephof at Rendezvous 2010, IIT Delhi, India

Background information
- Origin: Etten-Leur, North Brabant, Netherlands
- Genres: Progressive metalcore; djent
- Years active: 2001–2017; 2023–present
- Labels: Listenable; Nuclear Blast; Kscope
- Members: Stef Broks; Bart Hennephof; Remko Tielemans; Daniël de Jongh; Uri Dijk; Joe Tal
- Past members: Rom De Leeuw; Pieter Verpaalen; Dennis Aarts; Eric Kalsbeek; Richard Rietdijk; Jochem Jacobs
- Website: texturesband.com

Textures are a Dutch progressive metalcore band, formed in 2001. Textures' lineup revolved around founding members Jochem Jacobs, Stef Broks, Bart Hennephof, and bassist Remko Tielemans who joined in 2007. Since 2010, vocalist Daniël de Jongh and keyboardist Uri Dijk have been with the band.

Textures first came to the spotlight with their debut album Polars with Listenable Records which won an Essent Award for "Most Promising Act" in 2004. Since then, the band released 2 more albums with Listenable Records, 2006's Drawing Circles and 2008's Silhouettes after signing to Nuclear Blast records.

== History ==
=== Formation and Polars (2001–2003) ===
In 2001, Jochem Jacobs, guitarist Bart Hennephof, drummer Stef Broks, bassist Dennis Aarts and keyboard player Richard Rietdijk formed the band and were joined by vocalist Pieter Verpaalen for their debut album Polars with Listenable Records. The album was fully self produced, with the mixing and recording done by Jacobs and Rietdijk and the artwork done by Hennephof.

Textures was named by Stef Broks after a song from the Cynic album Focus as an indicator of the use of many layers of sounds in their songs, the blending of different musical backgrounds and tastes, as well as the varying personalities of the band members.

=== Drawing Circles and Silhouettes (2004–2008) ===
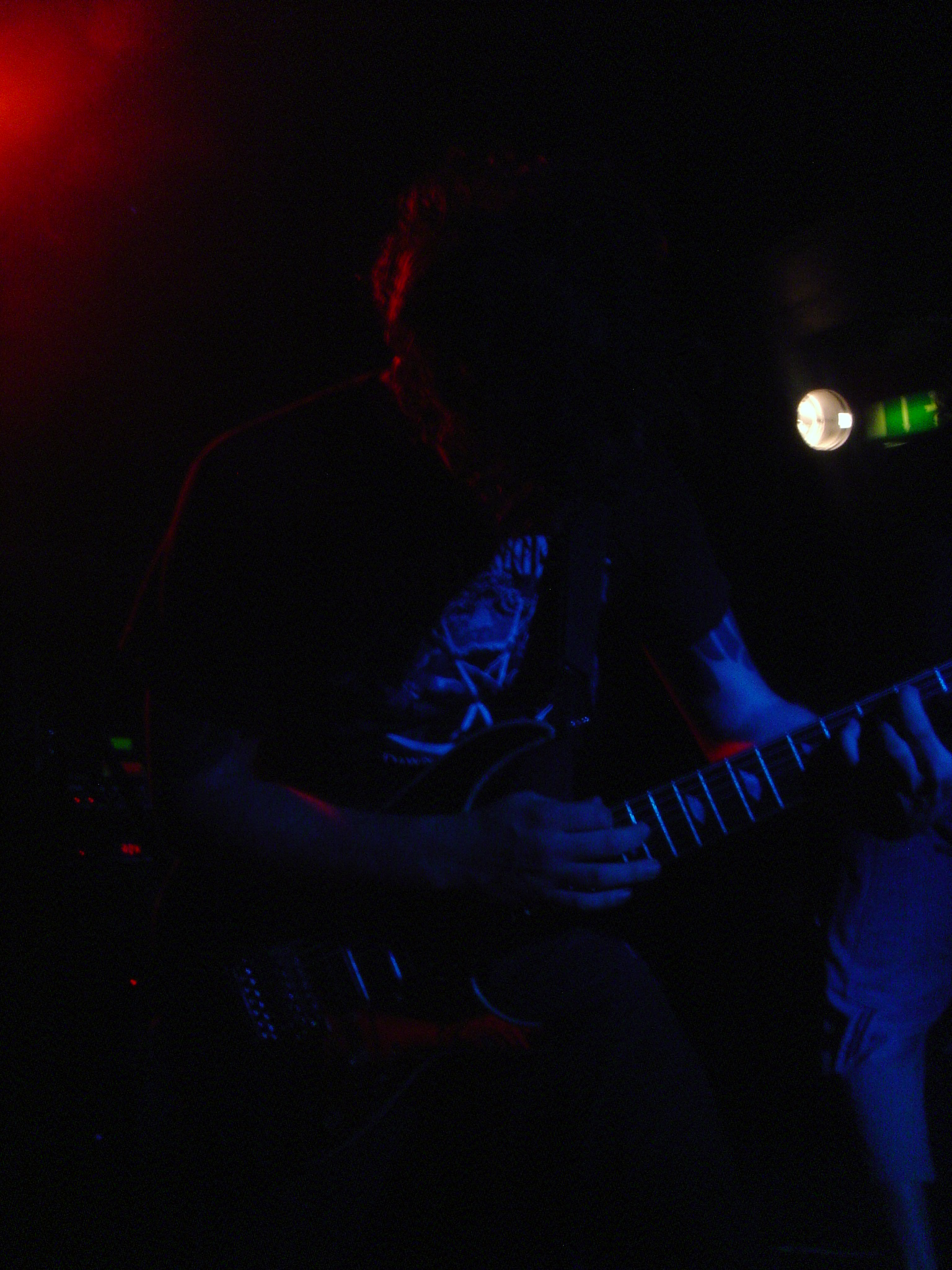
Guitarist Jochem Jacobs live in London, 2007

Vocalist Verpaalen was replaced by Eric Kalsbeek for their second album Drawing Circles, released on 17 October 2006. The song "Millstone" from the album was also made into a music video. In support of the album, Textures toured with bands such as The Ocean, Gojira and Arch Enemy and culminated in a Europe wide tour with All That Remains and Misery Signals plus nominations in three categories of Holland's Live XS Awards.

2007 saw the introduction of bassist Remko Tielemans, with whom the band recorded their 2008 release, Silhouettes which entered the Dutch charts at position no. 100, the band's first chart showing ever.

The album also featured the hit "Awake", which was made into a music video. The video was shot at the beginning of October in the Belgian Ardennes under supervision of director Rob Hodselmans and producer David Leite with assistance from the Dutch Government.

The vinyl version of Silhouettes was released in November 2008 through Garden of Exile Records. The LP was limited to 500 copies and pressed on 180-gram vinyl. The artwork was printed on extra-thick cardboard gatefold jacket with golden foil print.

The band played their first ever show in India, co-headlining the Deccan Rock Festival in Bangalore on 5 December 2009 along with Amon Amarth. The band returned to India in October 2010, performing in New Delhi at the annual festival of Indian Institute of Technology Delhi, Rendezvous 2010.

=== Line-up changes and Dualism (2009–2011) ===
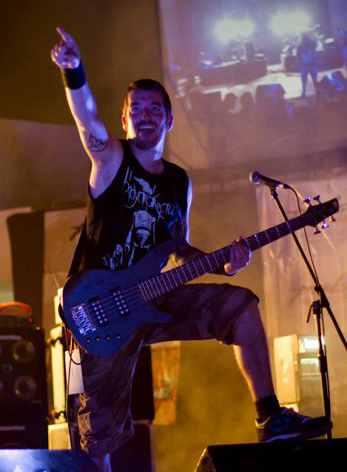
Bassist Remko Tielemans live in New Delhi, India

After 6 years, singer/frontman Eric Kalsbeek announced his departure from the band citing the lack of personal time and ability to continue with the band. In March 2010, Daniël de Jongh (formerly of Cilice) joined the band as a replacement. Due to the singer change, the follow-up to their 2008 release Silhouettes was postponed to early 2011.

Soon after Daniel de Jongh was announced as the replacement, keyboard player Richard Rietdijk left the band. He was replaced by Uri Dijk, originally as a live stand-in and finally as a permanent member in September 2010.

On 27 January 2011, the band announced on their official website they entered the studio to begin the recording of their fourth studio album, with the following statement:

We have started recording our fourth album at Split Second Sound studios in Amsterdam, the Netherlands. The album will be produced by Textures' guitar player Jochem Jacobs, who also was responsible for the production of Textures' previous albums.

Guitarist and producer Jacobs described the progress in the album recording as:

It's all really exciting! This album is really going to express where and what we are these days... and that's a good thing. We've been through a lot lately, especially the last year. Now with some new air and fresh ideas, we finally reached the point that we are actually quite confident in the new material. Sometimes you just have to crawl through the mud first to get to dry grounds. We are in the middle of the preproduction now, getting our asses in gear... to create this baby. It's kinda cool to see this band grow more and more and to continue this musical journey that we've been on for 10 years! Let's make this thing heavy!!!

In March 2011 the band released their first podcast covering the band's return to the studio for recording their fourth album. The new album was recorded in the Split Second Sound studio in Amsterdam, Netherlands. Jacobs and Broks stated that the new album was scheduled for release in Fall 2011 with Nuclear Blast Records. In May 2011 the band confirmed their first European Launch show at the Euroblast Festival in Köln, Germany in October alongside Chimp Spanner.

On 11 May 2011, guitarist Jacobs was adjudged the best Dutch guitarist in the Duiveltjes awards at the Gala van de Pop Muziek 2011 organized by Muziek Centrum Nederland, beating out Anne Soldaat and Vedran Mircetic.

On 14 July 2011, it was announced that the successor to Silhouettes would be titled Dualism. The artwork and track listing were unveiled on Textures official Facebook page and it was released on 23 September in Europe, South America and Asia, while North America had a 27 September release date through Nuclear Blast records. The first single from the album "Reaching Home" was released alongside a music video. In September 2011, Textures embarked on the Frak The Gods Tour, along with Periphery, The Contortionist and The Human Abstract in support of their album Dualism. This was Textures' first tour of the United States and Canada.

=== Jacobs's departure, Phenotype and break-up (2012–2017) ===
In January 2013, Jochem Jacobs announced he was leaving the band, but would remain writing and producing with the band. He was replaced by Joe Tal on 20 March.

In February 2016, Textures released their fifth album, Phenotype. It was recorded at the same time as another album, Genotype, which was set to be released in 2017, and both could be considered the parts of a double album due to a similar concept. In May 2017, the band also announced they would be splitting up after a farewell tour held in autumn, and the Genotype album would never be released. The band performed their final shows on 2 December 2017 in their hometown of Tilburg, and on 8 December 2017 in Pune, India where they had performed in 2013 with a line-up of three guitarists.

=== Return from hiatus and Genotype (2023–present) ===
On November 2, 2023, the band announced they would be returning in 2024 via Instagram.

On November 6, 2025, the band announced that their sixth studio album Genotype will be released on 23 January 2026 via Kscope. Singles were released for "Closer to the Unknown" and "At the Edge of Winter", the latter featuring former Delain vocalist Charlotte Wessels. Despite serving as the conceptual counterpart to Phenotype, Genotype is entirely written from scratch, leaving material from the previous Genotype recording session unused.

== Band members ==
Current members

- Stef Broks − drums (2001–2017, 2023–present)
- Bart Hennephof − guitar, backing vocals (2001–2017, 2023–present)
- Remko Tielemans − bass (2007–2017, 2023–present)
- Daniël de Jongh − lead vocals (2010–2017, 2023–present)
- Uri Dijk − keyboards (2010–2017, 2023–present)
- Joe Tal − guitar (2013–2017, 2023–present)

Former members

- Rom de Leeuw − lead vocals (2001–2002)
- Pieter Verpaalen − lead vocals (2002–2004; died 2024)
- Dennis Aarts − bass (2001–2007)
- Eric Kalsbeek − lead vocals (2004–2010)
- Richard Rietdijk − keyboards (2001–2010)
- Jochem Jacobs − guitar, backing vocals (2001–2013)

== Discography ==
- Polars (2003)
- Drawing Circles (2006)
- Silhouettes (2008)
- Dualism (2011)
- Phenotype (2016)
- Genotype (2026)

=== Singles/Music videos ===
- "Ostensibly Impregnable" (2004)
- "Millstone" (2006)
- "Awake" (2008)
- "Reaching Home" (2011)
- "New Horizons" (2015)
- "Shaping a Single Grain of Sand" (2016)
- "Closer to the Unknown" (2025)
- "At the Edge of Winter" (2025)
- "Vanishing Twin" (2025)
