= United Nations Centre for Urgent Environmental Assistance =

The now defunct United Nations Centre for Urgent Environmental Assistance (UNEP/UNCUEA) worked to coordinate an international response to man-made disasters. It was administrated by the United Nations Environmental Programme.

== Background ==
The short-lived Centre was created to respond to an initiative proposed by Mikhail Gorbachev in the late 1980s. UNEP Governing Council “... decided to establish the Centre at the beginning of 1992 for a period of eighteen month”.

Its operations were initially run by a small staff located in a Swiss government office in Geneva, Switzerland. Later, it was relocated to offices inside the International Environment House, found in Châtelaine.

The Centre collaborated with national focal points, with the perspective of “act[ing] primarily as a broker between assisting countries and affected countries”.

The information requested by the Centre listing national capabilities regarding emergency environmental assistance was directly stored on the Lotus Development Corporation's Lotus Note, supported by a Netware server.

These “resources were tested in a simulation exercise carried out in Tunisia in February 1993. The exercise demonstrated that the Centre can act as an effective broker between a State requesting assistance and potential donor countries and that cooperation with other United Nations agencies partners is feasible.”

“As regards mechanisms for dealing with requests for assistance, the Centre has prepared its own internal contingency plan, which has been tested on two occasions.”

However, it never received the necessary support due to criticism that it overlapped with already-existing agencies, like the International Maritime Organization and the International Atomic Energy Agency.
