= Curtiss, Wisconsin =

- Village
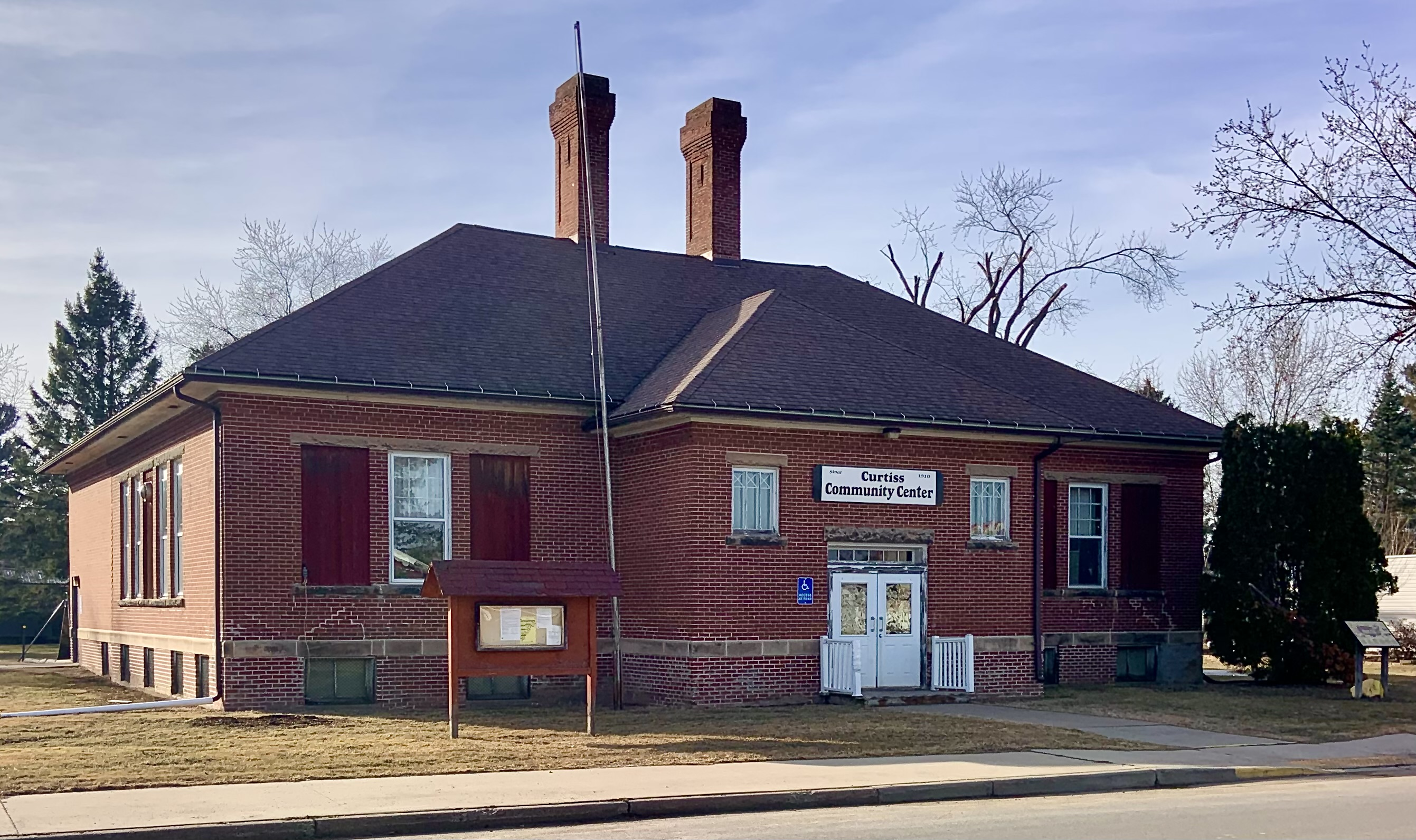
- Curtiss Village Hall

- Location of Curtiss in Clark County, Wisconsin.
- Coordinates: 44°57′13″N 90°26′0″W
- Country: United States
- State: Wisconsin
- County: Clark

Area
  - Total: 0.69 sq mi (1.78 km^{2})
  - Land: 0.69 sq mi (1.78 km^{2})
  - Water: 0 sq mi (0.00 km^{2})
- Elevation: 1,365 ft (416 m)

Population (2020)
  - Total: 292
  - Density: 425/sq mi (164/km^{2})
- Time zone: UTC-6 (Central (CST))
  - Summer (DST): UTC-5 (CDT)
- Area code: 715
- FIPS code: 55-18125
- GNIS feature ID: 1563636
- Website: http://www.villageofcurtiss.org/

Curtiss is a village in Clark County in the U.S. state of Wisconsin. The population was 292 at the 2020 census.

== Geography ==
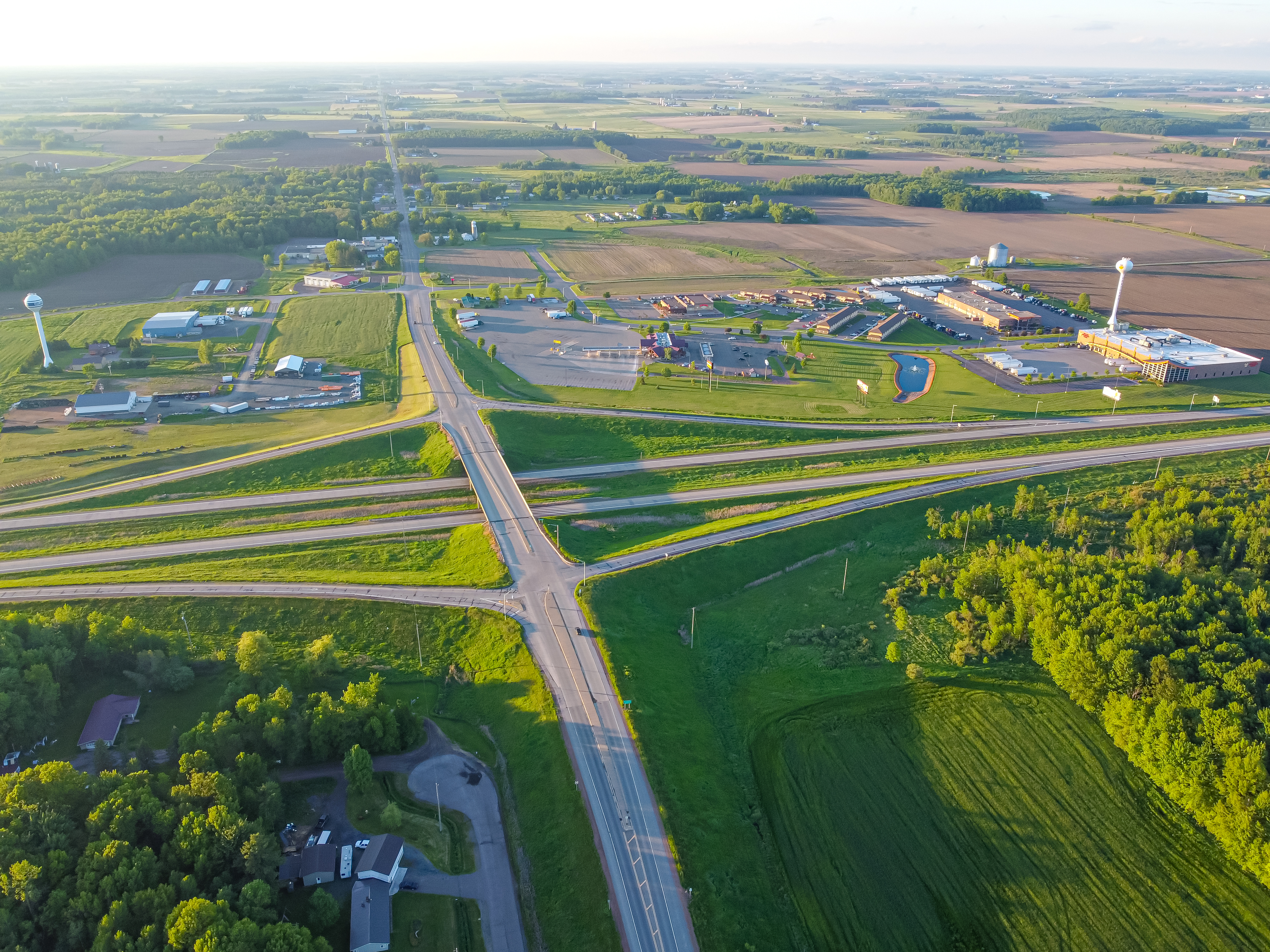
Wis-29 runs by town

Curtiss is located at 44°57′13″N 90°26′0″W (44.953574, -90.433228).

According to the United States Census Bureau, the village has a total area of 0.68 square miles (1.76 km^{2}), all land.

== History ==
Curtiss was established as a rural railroad station in 1882 and is named after the chief engineer who built the railroad. The village of Curtiss was platted November 17, 1882, having been surveyed by Edwin Parks. The surrounding area was occupied primarily by Norwegian and German emigrants. The primary industries were dairy farming and lumber. By the 1890s, several cheese factories were established in the surrounding townships of Mayville, Hoard and Colby. Additionally, A. D. Bass operated a large sawmill in the southern part of the village. An application for incorporation of the village was made to the State of Wisconsin on October 14, 1914: however, actual incorporation was not granted until March 30, 1917 (Curtiss Centennial Booklet). A two-room school served elementary grades until 1966 when the school was consolidated with the nearby Abbotsford Public Schools.

Perhaps the most famous person to come out of the Village of Curtiss was Army Colonel Franklin Matthias, who oversaw the construction and early operation of the Hanford Site during World War II. The young Colonel Matthias was so proud of his work that he accompanied the first plutonium produced at Hanford to Los Alamos.

On June 8, 1905, a hail storm damaged nearly every building in the village.

On October 15, 1974, Curtiss was the site of a protest by the National Farmers Organization (NFO). NFO farmers slaughtered and buried in a trench 638 calves, mostly less than two weeks old. The protest was in response to the low price of veal. At the time, veal calves were selling for $0.17 per pound, resulting in a net loss to the farmer due to high feed costs. Public backlash against the NFO and the protest was great, with President Ford weighing in to call it "shocking and senseless."

In 1976, the US EPA aided the village with a grant to establish a municipal sewer and water system. The system was expanded in the 1990s and again in the 2000s to account for industrial growth related to the meat packing industry.

== Demographics ==
Historical population
Census	Pop.	Note	%±
1920	186		—
1930	164		−11.8%
1940	171		4.3%
1950	139		−18.7%
1960	147		5.8%
1970	135		−8.2%
1980	127		−5.9%
1990	173		36.2%
2000	198		14.5%
2010	216		9.1%
2020	292		35.2%
U.S. Decennial Census

=== 2010 census ===
As of the census of 2010, there were 216 people, 76 households, and 52 families living in the village. The population density was 317.6 inhabitants per square mile (122.6/km^{2}). There were 82 housing units at an average density of 120.6 per square mile (46.6/km^{2}). The racial makeup of the village was 58.3% White, 0.5% African American, 1.4% Native American, and 39.8% from other races. Hispanic or Latino of any race were 51.9% of the population.

There were 76 households, of which 39.5% had children under the age of 18 living with them, 44.7% were married couples living together, 15.8% had a female householder with no husband present, 7.9% had a male householder with no wife present, and 31.6% were non-families. 25.0% of all households were made up of individuals, and 13.2% had someone living alone who was 65 years of age or older. The average household size was 2.84 and the average family size was 3.48.

The median age in the village was 30.5 years. 28.7% of residents were under the age of 18; 11% were between the ages of 18 and 24; 29.2% were from 25 to 44; 17.6% were from 45 to 64; and 13.4% were 65 years of age or older. The gender makeup of the village was 50.9% male and 49.1% female.

=== 2000 census ===
As of the census of 2000, there were 198 people, 68 households, and 45 families living in the village. The population density was 288.8 people per square mile (110.8/km^{2}). There were 70 housing units at an average density of 102.1 per square mile (39.2/km^{2}). The racial makeup of the village was 64.65% White, 0.51% Native American, 1.01% Asian, 33.84% from other races. Hispanic or Latino of any race were 34.34% of the population.

There were 68 households, out of which 41.2% had children under the age of 18 living with them, 60.3% were married couples living together, 2.9% had a female householder with no husband present, and 32.4% were non-families. 27.9% of all households were made up of individuals, and 17.6% had someone living alone who was 65 years of age or older. The average household size was 2.91 and the average family size was 3.70.

In the village, the population was spread out, with 35.4% under the age of 18, 6.6% from 18 to 24, 30.8% from 25 to 44, 12.1% from 45 to 64, and 15.2% who were 65 years of age or older. The median age was 29 years. For every 100 females, there were 108.4 males. For every 100 females age 18 and over, there were 113.3 males.

The median income for a household in the village was $29,250, and the median income for a family was $34,167. Males had a median income of $25,000 versus $23,125 for females. The per capita income for the village was $11,061. About 7.7% of families and 14.4% of the population were below the poverty line, including 17.9% of those under the age of eighteen and 5.6% of those 65 or over.

== Education ==
It is in the Abbotsford School District.
