= United Nations Environment Programme =

UN environmental response agency

United Nations Environment Programme (UNEP)
- Abbreviation: UNEP
- Formation: 5 June 1972; 54 years ago
- Type: Programme
- Legal status: Active
- Headquarters: Nairobi, Kenya
- Executive Director: Inger Andersen (since 2019)
- Parent organization: United Nations
- Website: www.unep.org

The United Nations Environment Programme (UNEP) is responsible for coordinating responses to environmental issues within the United Nations System. Its mandate is to provide leadership, deliver science and develop solutions on a wide range of issues, including climate change, the management of marine and terrestrial ecosystems, and green economic development. The organization also develops international environmental agreements; publishes and promotes environmental science and helps national governments achieve environmental targets.

As a member of the United Nations Sustainable Development Group, UNEP aims to help the world meet the 17 Sustainable Development Goals. UNEP hosts the secretariats of several multilateral environmental agreements and research bodies, including the Convention on Biological Diversity (CBD), the Minamata Convention on Mercury, the Basel, Rotterdam and Stockholm Conventions, the Convention on Migratory Species and the Convention on International Trade in Endangered Species of Wild Fauna and Flora (CITES), among others.

In 1988, the World Meteorological Organization and UNEP established the Intergovernmental Panel on Climate Change (IPCC). UNEP is also one of several Implementing Agencies for the Global Environment Facility (GEF) and the Multilateral Fund for the Implementation of the Montreal Protocol. From 2017 to 2020, the organization was referred to as UN Environment. The headquarters of UNEP is in Nairobi, Kenya.

== History ==
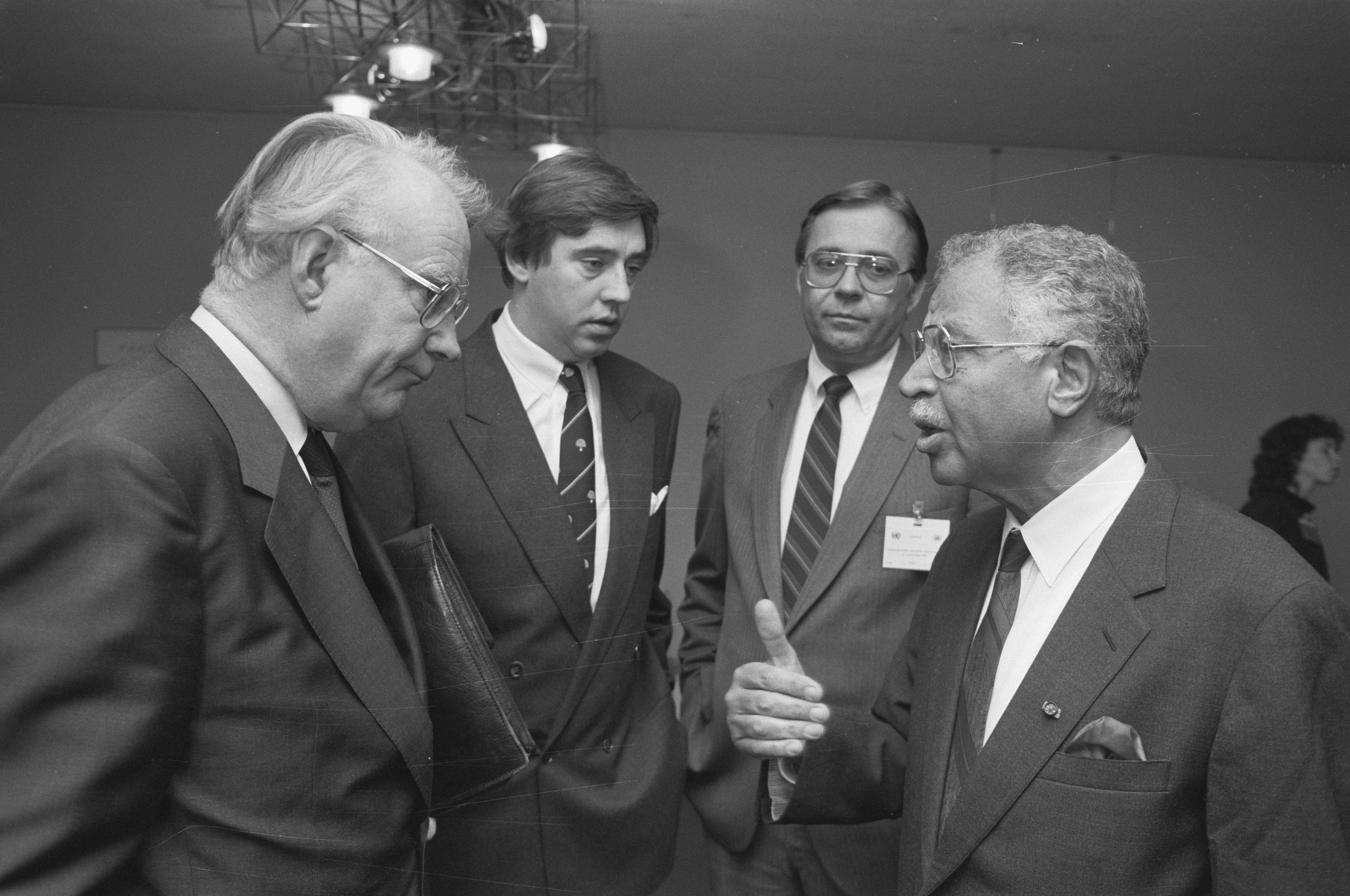
UNEP Conference on Ozone Layer in The Hague, 1988

In the 1970s, the need for environmental governance at a global level was not universally accepted, particularly by developing nations. Some argued that environmental concerns were not a priority for nations in poverty. The leadership of Canadian diplomat Maurice Strong convinced many of the developing nations' governments that they needed to prioritize this issue. In the words of Nigerian professor Adebayo Adedeji: "Mr. Strong, through the sincerity of his advocacy, soon made it clear that all of us, irrespective of the stage of our development, have a large stake in the matter."

After developing organizations such as the International Labour Organization, the Food and Agriculture Organization and the World Health Organization, the 1972 United Nations Conference on the Human Environment (the Stockholm Conference) was convened. In this conference various topics were discussed such as pollution, marine life, protection of resources, environmental change, and disasters relating to natural and biological change. This conference resulted in a Declaration on the Human Environment (Stockholm Declaration) and the establishment of an environmental management body, which was later named the United Nations Environment Programme (UNEP). UNEP was established by General Assembly Resolution 2997. Headquarters were established in Nairobi, Kenya, with a staff of 300, including 100 professionals in a variety of fields, and with a five-year fund of more than US$100 million. At the time, US$40 million were pledged by the United States and the remainder by 50 other nations. The 'Voluntary Indicative Scale of Contribution' established in 2002 has the role to increase the supporters of the UNEP. The finances related to all programs of UNEP is voluntarily contributed by Member states of the United Nations. The Environmental Fund, which all nations of UNEP invest in, is the core source of UNEP's programs. Between 1974 and 1986 UNEP produced more than 200 technical guidelines or manuals on environment including forest and water management, pest control, pollution monitoring, the relationship between chemical use and health, and management of industry.

The location of the headquarters proved to be a major controversy, with developed countries preferring Geneva, where several other UN offices are based, while developing countries preferred Nairobi, as that would be the first international organization headquartered in the Global South. At first, Mexico City, New Delhi, and Cairo were also competing to be the headquarters, but they pulled out to support Nairobi. Many of the developing countries were "not particularly supportive of creating a new formal institution for environmental governance", but supported its creation as an act of "Southern solidarity".

In 2000, the World Conservation Monitoring Centre, based in Cambridge and sponsored by IUCN, became part of UNEP.

== Governance ==
=== Executive director ===
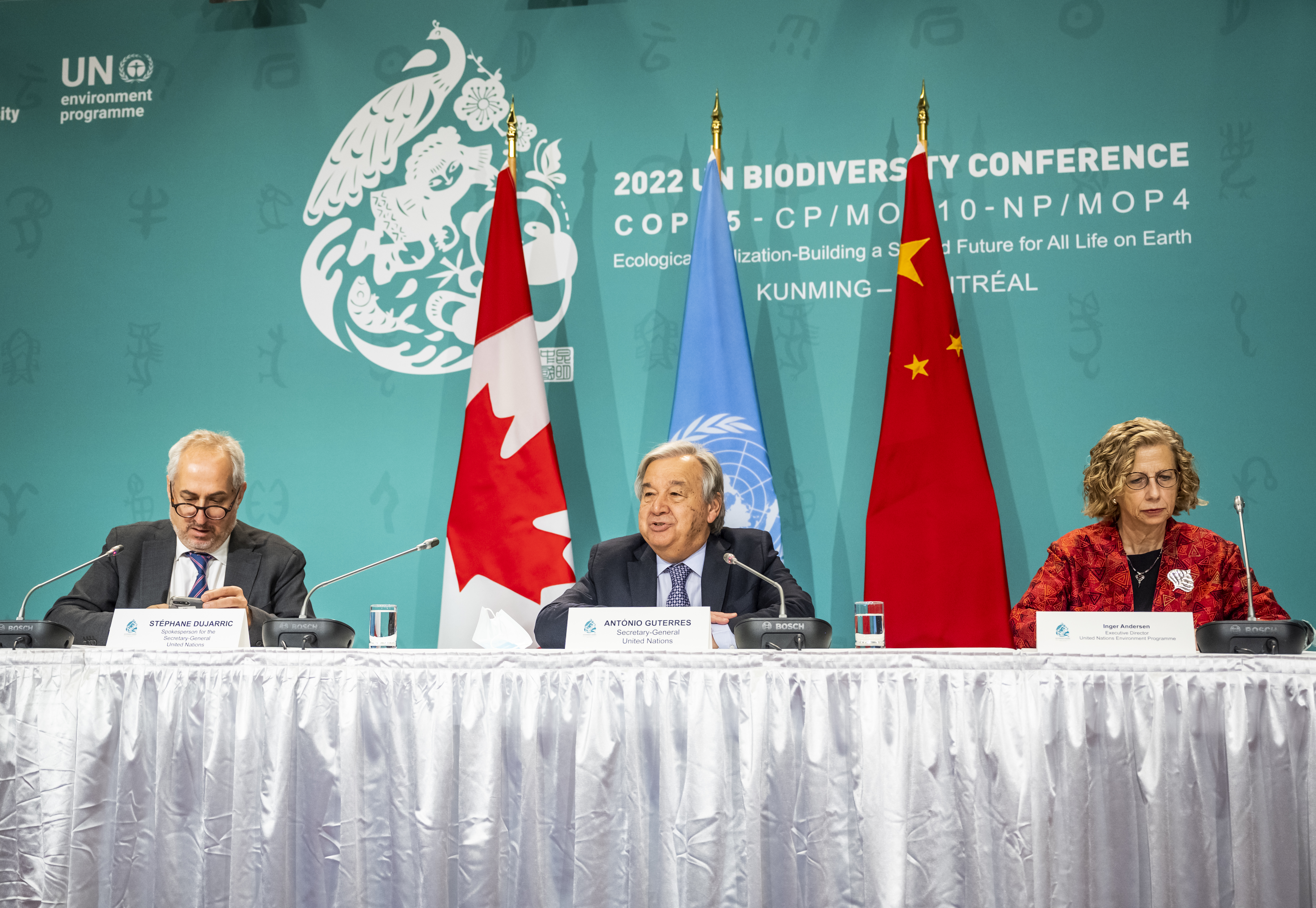
UNEP Executive Director Inger Andersen at the UN Biodiversity conference, 2022

In December 1972, the UN General Assembly unanimously elected Maurice Strong to be the first head of UN Environment. He was also secretary-general of both the 1972 United Nations Conference on the Human Environment and the Earth Summit (1992).

The position was then held for 17 years (1975–1992) by Mostafa Kamal Tolba, who was instrumental in bringing environmental considerations to the forefront of global thinking and action. Under his leadership, UNEP's most widely acclaimed success—the historic 1987 agreement to protect the ozone layer—the Montreal Protocol was negotiated. He was succeeded by Elizabeth Dowdeswell (1992–1998), Klaus Töpfer (1998–2006), Achim Steiner (2006–2016), and Erik Solheim (2016–2018).

UNEP's current executive director is Inger Andersen, who was appointed by the UN secretary-general António Guterres in February 2019. Joyce Msuya, was the former acting director who took office in November 2018 following the resignation of Erik Solheim. Prior to that appointment, she was UNEP's deputy executive director.

=== List of executive directors ===
#	Picture	Name (birth–death)	Nationality	Took office	Left office
1	Maurice Strong	Maurice Strong (1929–2015)	Canada	1972	1975
2	Mostafa Tolba	Mostafa Kamal Tolba (1922–2016)	Egypt	1975	1992
3	Elizabeth Dowdeswell	Elizabeth Dowdeswell (born 1944)	Canada	1992	1998
4	Klaus Töpfer	Klaus Töpfer (1938–2024)	Germany	1998	2006
5	Achim Steiner	Achim Steiner (born 1961)	Brazil	2006	2016
6		Erik Solheim (born 1955)	Norway	2016	2018
7		Joyce Msuya (acting) (born 1968)	Tanzania	2018	2019
8		Inger Andersen (born 1958)	Denmark	2019	Present

=== Environment Assembly ===
The United Nations Environment Assembly (UNEA) is UNEP's governing body. Created in 2012 to replace the Governing Council, it currently has 193 members and meets every two years.

The first session of the assembly took place in Nairobi from 23-27 June 2014.

The sixth session (UNEA-6) took place in Nairobi, Kenya, from 26 February to 1 March 2024, and the seventh session (UNEA-7) took place from 8 to 12 December 2025, also in Nairobi. The theme for UNEA-7 was "Advancing sustainable solutions for a resilient planet".

=== Structure ===
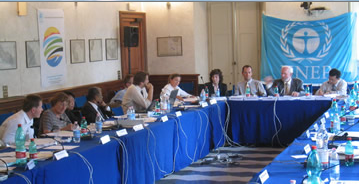
UNEP International Resource Panel meeting, 2011

UNEP's structure includes eight divisions:

1. Science Division: aims to provide scientifically credible environmental assessments and information for sustainable development. It reports on the state of the global environment, assesses policies, and aims to provide an early warning of emerging environmental threats. It is responsible for the monitoring and reporting of the environment regarding the 2030 Agenda and Sustainable Development Goals.
2. Policy and Programme Division: makes the policy and programme of the UNEP. This division ensures other divisions are coordinated.
3. Ecosystems Division: supports countries in conserving, restoring and managing their ecosystems. It addresses the environmental causes and consequences of disasters and conflicts. It helps countries reduce pollution from land-based activities, increase resilience to climate change, and think about the environment in their development planning.
4. Economy Division: assists large businesses in their efforts to be more environmentally conscious. It has three main branches: Chemicals and Health, Energy and Climate, and Resources and Markets.
5. Governance Affairs Office: engages member states and other relevant groups to use UNEP's work. The office serves UNEP's governing body, the United Nations Environment Assembly, and its subsidiary organ, the Committee of Permanent Representatives, and manages their meetings. It helps strengthen the visibility, authority and impact of the Assembly as an authoritative voice on the environment.
6. Law Division: helps to develop environmental law. Works with countries to combat environmental crime and meet international environmental commitments. The law division aims to improve cooperation between lawmakers around the world who are making environmental laws.
7. Communication Division: develops and disseminates UNEP's messages. It delivers them to governments and individuals through digital and traditional media channels.
8. Corporate Services Division: handles UNEP's corporate interests such as management and exposure to financial risk.

== Topic areas ==
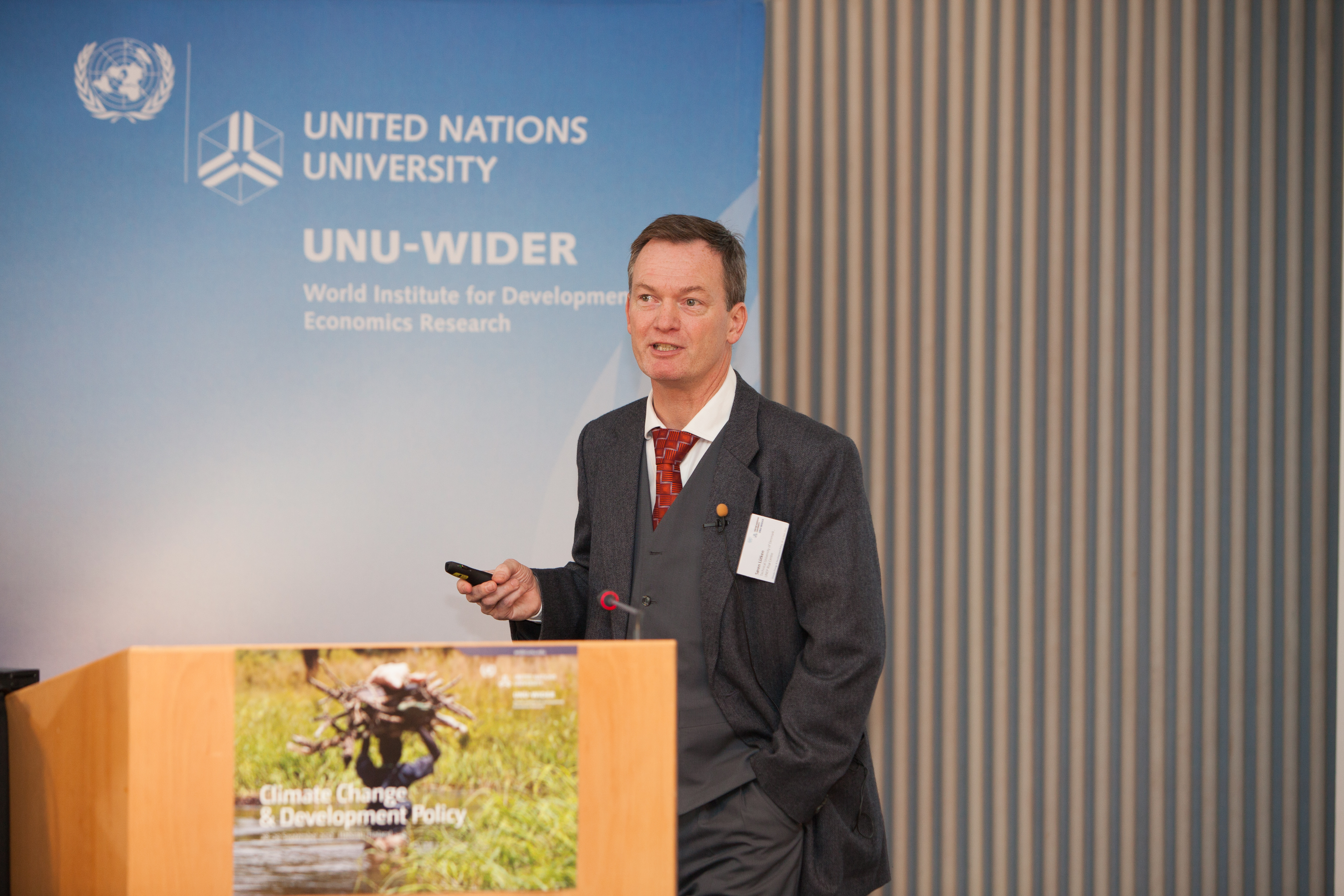
Presentation on climate finance by Søren E. Lütken, UNEP Senior Adviser, 2012

UNEP's main activities are related to:

1. Climate action
2. Disasters and conflicts ("to minimize the environmental causes and consequences of crises")
3. Nature Action ("conservation, restoration and the sustainable use of nature")
4. Global environmental governance (the UNEP website states that "UNEP is committed to supporting countries in developing and implementing integrated environmental policies").
5. Data collection and reporting (UNEP provides information and data on the global environment to stakeholders including governments, non-governmental organizations and the public for them to engage in realizing the Sustainable Development Goals. For example, the UN environment Live Platform and Online Access to Research in Environment (OARE) provide transparent information collected by UNEP.)
6. Chemicals and waste
7. Resource efficiency

== Advocacy ==
UNEP uses its position to raise awareness for a range of issues.

=== Climate change ===
Already in 1989, UNEP published a statement predicting that "entire nations could be wiped off the face of the Earth by sea level rise if the global warming trend is not reversed by the year 2000". In 2005, UNEP issued a joint statement with the United Nations University predicting that "50 million people could become environmental refugees by 2010, fleeing the effects of climate change". This was reinforced in 2008, by Srgjan Kerim, President of the UN General Assembly, who estimated that there would be between 50 million and 200 million environmental migrants by 2010.

At the fifth Magdeburg Environmental Forum held in 2008, in Magdeburg, Germany, UNEP and car manufacturer Daimler AG called for the establishment of infrastructure for electric vehicles. At this international conference 250 politicians and representatives of non-government organizations discussed future road transportation under the motto of "Sustainable Mobility–the Post-2012 CO_{2} Agenda".

=== Various initiatives ===
==== International Environmental Education Programme (1975–1995) ====
For two decades, UNESCO and UNEP led the International Environmental Education Programme (1975–1995), which set out a vision for, and gave practical guidance on how to mobilize education for environmental awareness. In 1976 UNESCO launched an environmental education newsletter Connect as the official organ of the UNESCO-UNEP International Environmental Education Programme (IEEP). Until 2007 it served as a clearinghouse to exchange information on environmental education in general and to promote the aims and activities of the IEEP in particular, as well as being a network for institutions and individuals interested and active in environment education.

==== Circular economy ====
UNEP is the co-chair and a founding partner (along with groups such as the Ellen MacArthur Foundation) for the Platform for Accelerating the Circular Economy, which is a public-private partnership of over 50 global organizations and governments seeking to support the transition to a global circular economy.

==== The Regional Seas Programme ====
Established in 1974, this is the world's only legal programme for the purpose of protecting the oceans and seas at the regional level. More than 143 countries participate in 18 regional programmes established by the Regional Seas Conventions and Action Plans, with 14 of them underpinned by legally binding international conventions, such as the Helsinki Convention, the Oslo Dumping Convention, the Barcelona Convention or the Bucharest Convention. The RSCAPs include the Caribbean region, East Asian seas, East African region, Mediterranean Basin, Pacific Northwest region, West African region, Caspian Sea, Black Sea region, Northeast Pacific region, Red Sea and Gulf of Aden, ROPME Sea Area, South Asian seas, Southeast Pacific region, Pacific region, Arctic region, Antarctic region, Baltic Sea, and Northeast Atlantic region. Each programme consists of countries which share the same sea and manages this sea at the regional level. The programmes are controlled by secretariats or Regional Coordinating Units and Regional Activity Centers. UNEP protects seas by promoting international conventions through education and training.

The Mediterranean Action Plan of the United Nations Environment Programme (UNEP/MAP) was established in 1975 as the first regional action plan under the Regional Seas Programme.

==== Faith for Earth Initiative ====
Launched in 2017, the initiative's goal is to encourage and collaborate with faith-based organizations to protect the environment and invest in green resources. In 2020, UNEP published a book with the Parliament of the World's Religions Climate Action Program entitled, "Faith for Earth: A Call for Action." The book serves as an educational resource for students, teachers, and leaders across the world and highlights the role that faith-based organizations can play in addressing critical environmental issues.

== Other activities ==
=== Awards programs ===
Several awards programs have been established to recognize outstanding work in the environmental field. The Global 500 Roll of Honour was initiated in 1987 and ended in 2003. Its 2005 successor, Champions of the Earth, and a similar award, Young Champions of the Earth, are given annually to entrepreneurs, scientists, policy leaders, upcoming talent, individuals and organizations who make significant positive impacts on resources and the environment in their areas.

=== International years ===
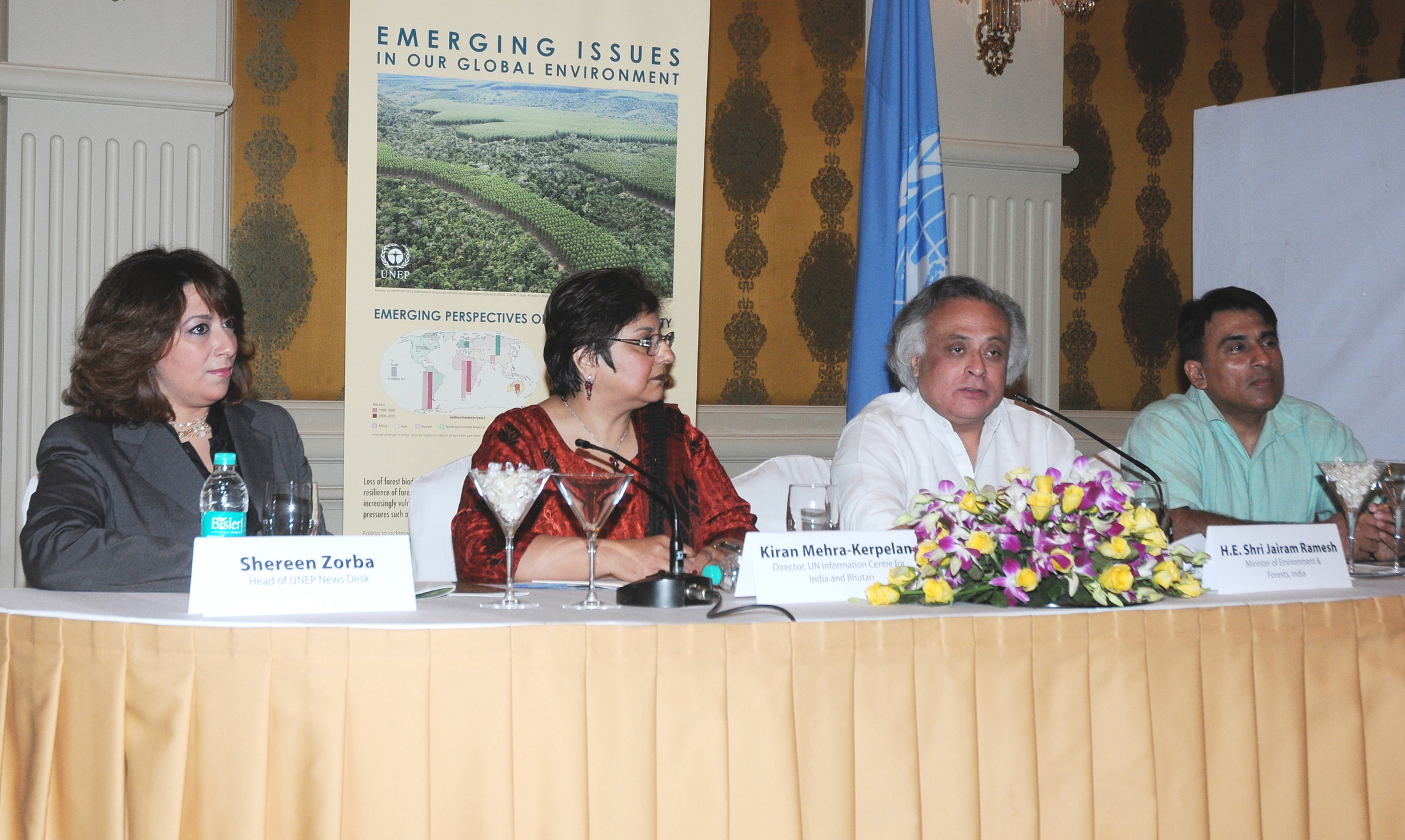
The Minister of State for Environment and Forests, Shri Jairam Ramesh, delivering the inaugural address at the Reporting Green: UNEP Media Workshop on Journalism and the Environment during the International Year of Forests, 2011

UN assigns specific years to topics to raise awareness and engagement. The following years pertain to environmental topics:

- 2007 – International Year of the Dolphin: International Patron of the Year of the Dolphin was H.S.H. Prince Albert II of Monaco, with Special Ambassador to the cause being Nick Carter of the Backstreet Boys musical group.
- 2010 – International Year of Biodiversity
- 2011 – International Year of Forests
- 2012 – International Year for Sustainable Energy for All
- 2013 – International Year of Water Cooperation
- 2014 – International Year of Family Farming
- 2015 – International Year of Light and Light-based Technologies
- 2016 – International Year of Pulses
- 2017 – International Year of Sustainable Tourism for Development
- 2020 – International Year of Plant Health
- 2021 – International Year of Fruits and Vegetables

See international observance and list of environmental dates.

== Notable achievements ==
UNEP has registered several successes, such as the 1987 Montreal Protocol for limiting emissions of gases blamed for thinning the planet's protective ozone layer, and the 2017 Minamata Convention, a treaty to limit toxic mercury.

UNEP has sponsored the development of solar loan programmes, with attractive return rates, to buffer the initial deployment costs and entice consumers to consider and purchase solar PV systems. The most famous example is the solar loan programme sponsored by UNEP that helped 100,000 people finance solar power systems in India. Success in India's solar programme has led to similar projects in other parts of the developing world, including Tunisia, Morocco, Indonesia and Mexico.

In 2001, UNEP alerted about the destruction of the Marshlands when it released satellite images showing that 90 percent of the marsh had been lost. The UNEP "support for environmental management of the Iraqi Marshland" began in 2004, to manage the marshland area in an environmentally sound manner.

UNEP has a programme for young people known as Tunza. Within this programme are other projects like the AEO for Youth.

== Reform ==
Following the 2007 publication of the Intergovernmental Panel on Climate Change Fourth Assessment Report, the Paris Call for Action, presented by French president Jacques Chirac and supported by 46 countries, called for the UNEP to be replaced by a new and more powerful "United Nations Environment Organization", to be modeled on the World Health Organization. The 46 countries included the European Union nations, but notably did not include the United States, Saudi Arabia, Russia, and China, the top four emitters of greenhouse gases.

In December 2012, following the Rio+20 Summit, a decision by the General Assembly of the United Nations to "strengthen and upgrade" the UNEP and establish universal membership of its governing body was confirmed. In other words, it was reorganized by applying the existing executive member system (58 member states) from 1973 to 2013 to a universal member system (all UN member states). It was implemented in 2014.

== Funding ==
The European Investment Bank and the United Nations Environment Programme created the Renewable Energy Performance Platform (REPP) in 2015 to assist a United Nations project dubbed Sustainable Energy for All. Renewable Energy Performance Platform was established with $67 million from the United Kingdom's International Climate Finance initiative, administered by the Department for Business, Energy and Industrial Strategy, in 2015, and $128 million in 2018. REPP was established with a five-year goal of improving energy access for at least two million people in Sub-Saharan Africa. It has so far invested around $45 million to renewable energy projects in 13 countries in Sub-Saharan Africa. Solar power and hydropower are among the energy methods used in the projects.

=== Funding complications ===
In September 2018, a series of allegations were made against the executive director of the UNEP, Eric Solheim, at that time, including excessive number of days spent outside the headquarters in Nairobi, Kenya. As a result, Eric Solheim resigned. Several donor countries withdrew their donation in the aftermath of the allegation, including the Dutch government who announced it would withhold $8 million in funding to UNEP until nepotism issues were resolved. Sweden and Denmark stopped funding as well. A spokesman for the Norwegian Institute of International Affairs said the freezing of funds was probably unprecedented.

== See also ==
- 2010 Biodiversity Indicators Partnership
- Environmental governance
- Global plastic pollution treaty
- Timeline of environmental events
- UNEP GEO Data Portal
- United Nations Billion Tree Campaign
- United Nations Centre for Urgent Environmental Assistance
- United Nations Environment Programme Finance Initiative
- World Conservation Monitoring Centre
