= Drawing Circles =

Studio album by Textures
- Released: October 16, 2006
- Genre: Progressive metalcore
- Length: 55:20
- Label: Listenable
- Producer: Jochem Jacobs

Textures chronology
Polars (2003)	Drawing Circles (2006)	Silhouettes (2008)

Professional ratings
Review scores
Source	Rating
AllMusic	link
Scream Magazine	5/6 stars

Drawing Circles is the second studio album by Dutch progressive metalcore band Textures. It was released on October 16, 2006, by Listenable Records. It marks the first album to feature vocalist Eric Kalsbeek.

A video was made for the track "Millstone."

== Track listing ==
All music and lyrics by Textures.

No.	Title	Length
1.	"Drive"	2:26
2.	"Regenesis"	4:57
3.	"Denying Gravity"	5:15
4.	"Illumination"	1:56
5.	"Stream of Consciousness"	6:48
6.	"Upwards"	6:06
7.	"Circular"	5:13
8.	"Millstone"	3:42
9.	"Touching the Absolute"	8:07
10.	"Surreal State of Enlightenment" (instrumental)	3:49
Total length:		48:19

== Personnel ==
Textures

- Jochem Jacobs – guitar, backing vocals
- Stef Broks – drums
- Dennis Aarts – bass guitar
- Bart Hennephof – guitar, backing vocals
- Eric Kalsbeek – lead vocals
- Richard Rietdijk – synthesizer, keyboards

Production

- Jochem Jacobs - engineering, mixing
- Björn Engelmann - mastering
- Sander van Gelswijck - engineering
- Eric Kalsbeek - artwork, layout
- Bart Hennephof - artwork
