= Silhouettes (Textures album) =

Studio album by Textures
- Released: 5 May 2008
- Studio: Split Second Sound, Amsterdam, Netherlands; Excess Studios, Rotterdam, Netherlands
- Genre: Progressive metalcore
- Length: 47:24
- Label: Listenable
- Producer: Jochem Jacobs, Bart Hennephof

Textures chronology
Drawing Circles (2006)	Silhouettes (2008)	Dualism (2011)

Singles from Silhouettes
- 1. "Old Days Born Anew" Released: March 14, 2008; 2. "Storm Warning" Released: April 1, 2008

Silhouettes is the third studio album by Dutch progressive metalcore band Textures. It was released on May 5, 2008, by Listenable Records. The first single from the album, "Old Days Born Anew" was released digitally on 14 March 2008 to the band's MySpace. On 1 April 2008 the second single, "Storm Warning" was released. It was announced on 11 April 2008 that due to a manufacturing delay, the album would not be released until 5 May 2008, except in Benelux, where the album was released on 21 April 2008.

This is the second and last album to feature Eric Kalsbeek on vocals, the third and last album to feature Richard Rietdijk on synthesizer, and the first album to feature bassist Remko Tielemans.

== Track listing ==
- All songs written and arranged by Textures.

No.	Title	Length
1.	"Old Days Born Anew"	5:37
2.	"The Sun's Architect"	5:16
3.	"Awake"	4:14
4.	"Laments of an Icarus"	4:12
5.	"One Eye for a Thousand"	6:14
6.	"State of Disobedience"	4:10
7.	"Storm Warning"	5:46
8.	"Messengers"	5:09
9.	"To Erase a Lifetime"	6:53
Total length:		47:24

== Personnel ==
Textures

- Eric Kalsbeek - vocals
- Jochem Jacobs - guitar, backing vocals
- Bart Hennephof - guitar, backing vocals
- Richard Rietdijk - synthesizer, keyboards
- Remko Tielemans - bass
- Stef Broks - drums

Production

- Jochem Jacobs - recording, mixing, mastering
- Bart Hennephof - recording
