= Phenotype (album) =

Studio album by Textures
- Released: 5 February 2016
- Studios: Split Second; Final Focus; STUR Designs; Landgoed de Olmenhorst; Mailmen
- Genres: Progressive metalcore; djent
- Length: 43:50
- Label: Nuclear Blast
- Producers: Bart Hennephof; Jochem Jacobs

Textures chronology
Dualism (2011)	Phenotype (2016)	Genotype (2026)

Professional ratings
Review scores
Source	Rating
Metal Injection	9/10 stars

Phenotype is the fifth studio album by Dutch progressive metalcore band Textures. It was released on 5 February 2016 by Nuclear Blast Records.

The album was recorded at the same time as another album, Genotype, which was set to be released in 2017. Both albums were based around the same concept, and thus could be considered parts of a double album. The band's sixth studio album with the title Genotype is completely written from scratch, leaving material from the previous Genotype recording session unused.

This is the first album to feature new lead guitarist Joe Tal, who replaced founding member Jochem Jacobs (who continued in his role as producer).

== Track listing ==
All tracks are written by Textures.

Phenotype track listing
No.	Title	Length
1.	"Oceans Collide"	6:03
2.	"New Horizons"	4:51
3.	"Shaping a Single Grain of Sand"	4:20
4.	"Illuminate the Trail"	7:15
5.	"Meander"	1:39
6.	"Erosion"	4:34
7.	"The Fourth Prime"	7:06
8.	"Zman" (instrumental)	3:20
9.	"Timeless"	4:42
Total length:		43:50

== Personnel ==
Credits are adapted from the album's liner notes.

=== Textures ===
- Stef Broks – drums, arrangements
- Daniël de Jongh – vocals, arrangements
- Joe Tal – guitars, arrangements
- Bart Hennephof – guitars, backing vocals, arrangements, production, recording
- Uri Dijk – synthesizers, arrangements, co-production, field recordings, sample recordings
- Remko Tielemans – bass guitar, arrangements, album artwork, photography

=== Additional contributors ===
- Jochem Jacobs – production, recording, mixing, mastering
- Yuma van Eekelen – co-production, recording, field recordings, sample recordings, additional drums on "Meander"
- Martin Beusker – drums recording on "Meander"
- Jasper Barendregt – additional drums on "Meander"
- Koen Herfst – additional drums on "Meander"
- Joey de Boer – additional drums on "Meander"
- Greg Candel – additional drums on "Meander"
- Bartho Staalman – additional drums on "Meander"
- Lasse Groeneveld – additional drums on "Meander"
