= Ja Ordu =

Ja Ordu جااردو
- Village
- Location within Iran
- Coordinates: 32°46′46″N 48°19′14″E
- Country: Iran
- Province: Khuzestan
- County: Andimeshk
- Bakhsh: Alvar-e Garmsiri
- Rural District: Qilab

Population (2006)
  - Total: 771
- Time zone: UTC+3:30 (IRST)
  - Summer (DST): UTC+4:30 (IRDT)

Ja Ordu (Persian: جااردو, also Romanized as Jā Ordū) is a village in Qilab Rural District, Alvar-e Garmsiri District, Andimeshk County, Khuzestan Province, Iran. At the 2006 census, its population was 771, in 150 families.
