= Google Public Data Explorer =

Service by Google

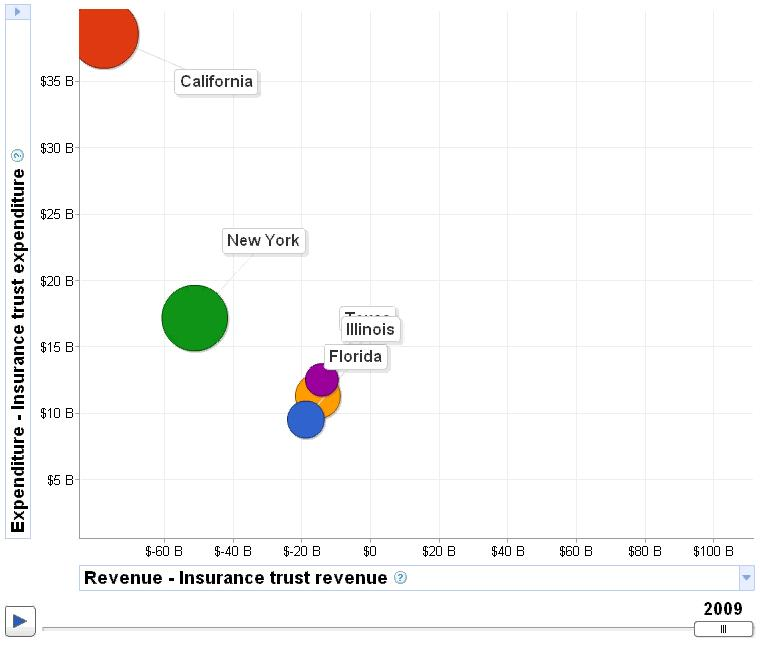
- Example of an animated bubble plot.
- Developer: Google Inc.
- Initial release: 8 March 2010; 16 years ago
- Platform: Web platform
- Available in: 40 languages
- Type: Collaborative software, Data visualization
- Website: www.google.com/publicdata/

Google Public Data Explorer provides public data and forecasts from a range of international organizations and academic institutions including the World Bank, OECD, Eurostat and the University of Denver. These can be displayed as line graphs, bar graphs, cross-sectional plots or on maps. The product was launched on March 8, 2010 as an experimental visualization tool in Google Labs.

In 2011 the Public Data Explorer was made available to everyone. The Dataset Publishing Language (DSPL) was created to be used with the platform. Once data is imported, the dataset can be visualized, embedded in external websites, and shared with others.

In May 2016, the addition of the Google Analytics Suite enabled the import of public or individual datasets and provided no-code data visualization tools to users.

== SDMX conversion ==
The SDMX converter is an open source application that offers the ability to convert DSPL (Google's Dataset Publishing Language) messages to SDMX-ML, and vice versa. The output file of a DSPL dataset is a zip file containing data (in the form of CSV files) and metadata (as an XML file). Datasets in this format can be visualized in the Google Public Data Explorer.

== See also ==
- Trendalyzer
