= Cypher16 =

UK rock band

Cypher16 is a British rock band that plays a blend of metal and industrial music. They have held tours in multiple countries that include China and India, and have played shows and festivals with bands such as Amaranthe, Lamb of God, and Slayer.

== Band members ==
The band is currently made up of Jack Doolan (guitar/vocals), Will Cass (guitar), Declan Doran (drums), and Rich Gray (Bass guitar).

Past members include Tom Clarke, Chris Woollams, Julian Shiu, Adrian Serrano "Litro", and Stuart Deards.

== Band history ==
Cypher16 released their first EP, The Man of the Black Abyss, in 2008, followed by The Metaphorical Apocalypse in 2011. In April 2013 they released Determine to coincide with their performance at Bloodstock Festival. The following year they held their ten country The March of Nations tour and performed at festivals such as Hammerfest, Trondheim Metal Fest, and Midi Festival. The band also entered the studio to record their debut album, with producer Romesh Dodangoda.

In 2015 Cypher16 toured with Amaranthe, followed by a 17-date second tour in China and festival performances. In October of the same year they released their debut album, The Great Surveyor. It received praise from Metal Hammer and Powerplay magazines, the latter of which called the band "undoubtedly one of the most exciting young acts in Britain right now".

The following year Cypher16 performed at Hammerfest before touring twice as an opening act for Amaranthe. In 2017 the band released a video for "Open the Dark Door", which was filmed at the Natural History Museum in London. They continued to perform in 2018 and began recording their second album, working with Jakob Herrmann and mastering the record at Abbey Road in London, England in 2019. In April 2020 they released "Break" as the first single from their second album, which received radio rotation on Brazil's 89FM, followed by "Push Through the Water" in June, and album title-track "It's a Long Way Back (From This Road)" in September.

== Discography ==
=== EPs ===
- The Man of the Black Abyss (2008)
- The Metaphorical Apocalypse (2011)
- Determine (April 2013)

=== Albums ===
- The Great Surveyor (2015)
