= Phenotype (igneous petrology) =

In igneous petrology, a phenotype is an aphanitic igneous rock which is identified and classified according to the mineralogy of its phenocrysts, when it is impossible to determine the mineralogy of the groundmass. Because phenocrysts represent the earlier part of crystallisation, and a melt may have evolved somewhat in between stages of cooling, they cannot be used to accurately describe the rock's true mineralogy or chemistry, but do provide an approximate estimation. As a result of this potential for error, phenotypes are identified using the prefix pheno-.
