= Slagwerkkrant =

Dutch bi-monthly magazine

Slagwerkkrant cover, September/October 2006 issue.

Slagwerkkrant is a Dutch bi-monthly magazine for drummers and percussionists.

== History and profile ==
Slagwerkkrant's first issue was printed in 1985. Despite being printed exclusively in the Dutch language, the magazine has built up a solid reputation in the international drumming community. Many drummers, such as Simon Phillips, Terry Bozzio and Virgil Donati, collaborate closely with the magazine's staff organizing drum events in The Netherlands on a regular basis.

The bi-monthly issues offer interviews with national and international drummers and percussionists, tests of drum and percussion products, articles on various drum and percussion related topics, reviews of drum events, CD and DVD reviews and more.

Slagwerkkrant is published by Keijser 18 Mediaproducties, a publishing company in Amsterdam.

In 2005, Slagwerkkrant joined forces with Dutch drumming community website SlagwerkWereld, who launched an international version of their website, DrummersZone, the same year.
