= James L. Hoard =

American chemist

James Lynn Hoard (December 28, 1905 – April 10, 1993) was an American chemist, a member of the Manhattan Project. Hoard was internationally recognized for his research of boron. Linus Pauling, a Nobel Prize laureate, said that Hoard "contributed significantly to ... the chemistry of certain elements such as boron, and the structure of regions of hemoglobins where oxygen molecules are bonded to iron."

Hoard was also notable for his work on the Manhattan project where he overcame some important challenges with the uranium compounds.

Hoard was a member of the National Academy of Sciences, a recipient of the award for Distinguished Service in the Advancement of Inorganic Chemistry from the American Chemical Society, a Guggenheim fellow. The New York Times called him "an expert in crystallography whose work helped to explain crystalline and molecular structures".

== Career ==
Hoard received a doctorate in chemistry from the California Institute of Technology in 1932. He accepted a faculty position at the Cornell University in 1936, was promoted to full professor in 1942, and advanced to emeritus status in 1971.
