= Eski Ordu Marşı =

Ottoman military band song

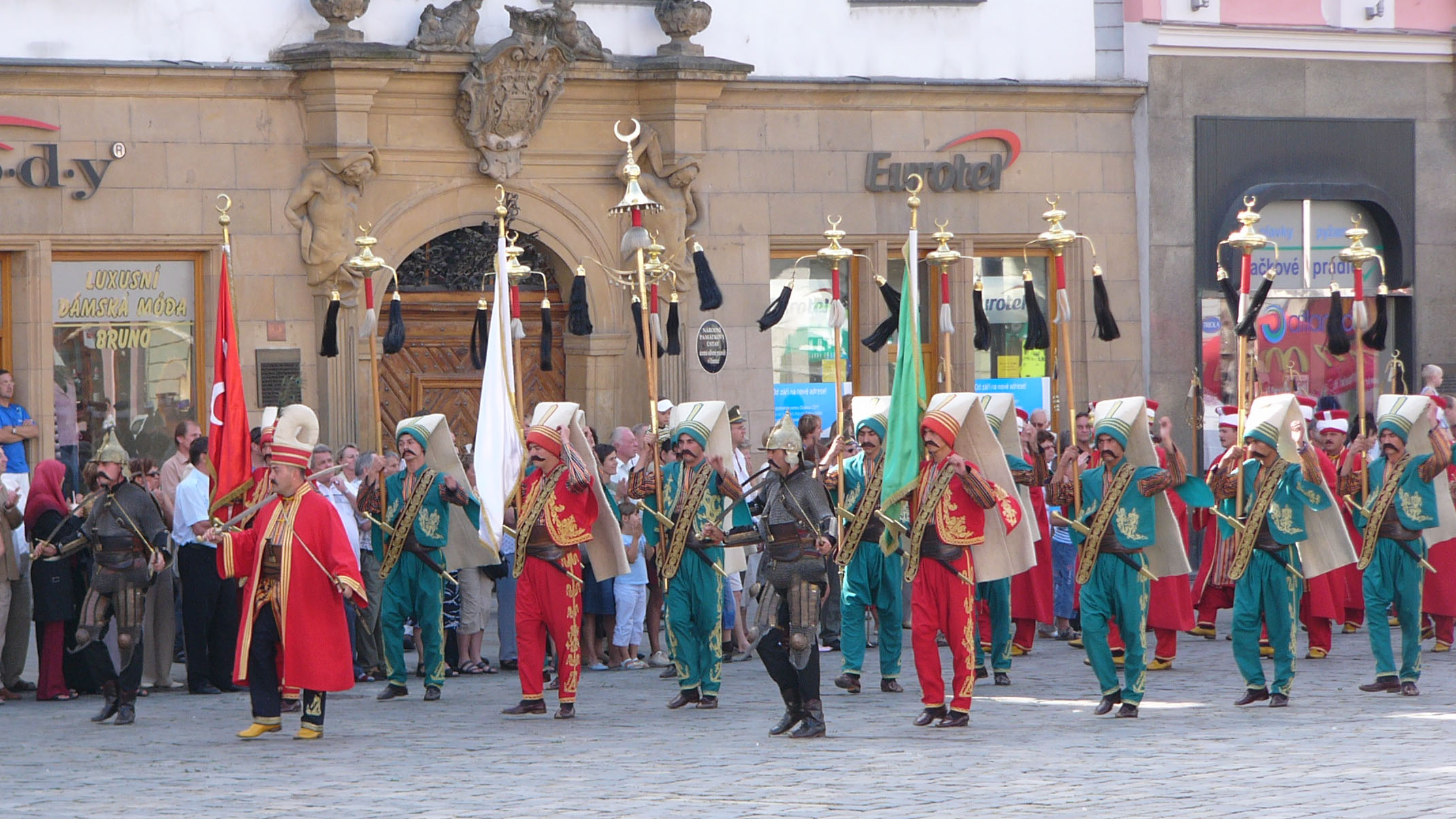
A modern mehter marching band

Eski Ordu Marşı ("Old Army March") is a Rast Mehter song composed by Muallim İsmail Hakkı Bey (1865-1927).

== Lyrics ==
Ey şanlı ordu, ey şanlı asker
Haydi gazanfer umman-ı safter
Bir elde kalkan, bir elde hançer
Serhadde doğru ey şanlı asker.

Deryada olsa herşey muzaffer
Dillerde tekbir, Allahü ekber

Allahü ekber, Allahü ekber
Ordumuz olsun daim muzaffer.

=== English ===
O glorious army! O great soldier,
Come on the glorious sea of bastion smashers,
A shield in one hand and the dagger in the other,
Let's advance to the border O gallant soldier.

May everything be victorious in this sea.
Chanting the takbir, "Allah is the greatest"

Allah is greatest, Allah is greatest,
May our army be eternally victorious.
