= UNEP Environmental Data Explorer =

United Nations data portal (2002–2016)

The UNEP Environmental Data Explorer (what was the GEO Data Portal until June 2012) was an authoritative source for data sets used by the UNEP and its partners in the Global Environment Outlook (GEO) report and other integrated environment assessments. Its online database held more than 500 different variables, as national, sub-regional, regional and global statistics or as geospatial data sets (maps), covering themes like Freshwater, Population, Forests, Emissions, Climate, Disasters, Health and GDP. One could display them on-the-fly as maps, graphs, data tables or download the data in different formats.

Service was launched in 2002 January and shut down in 2016 June.
