= Hoard, Wisconsin =

- Town
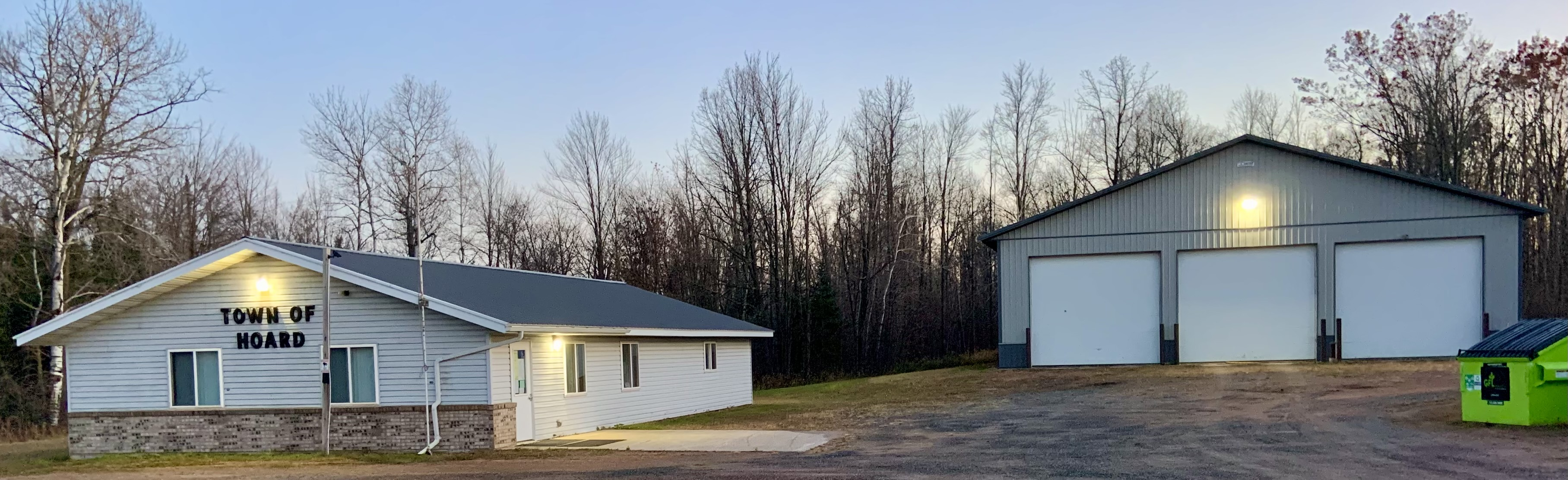
- Town hall

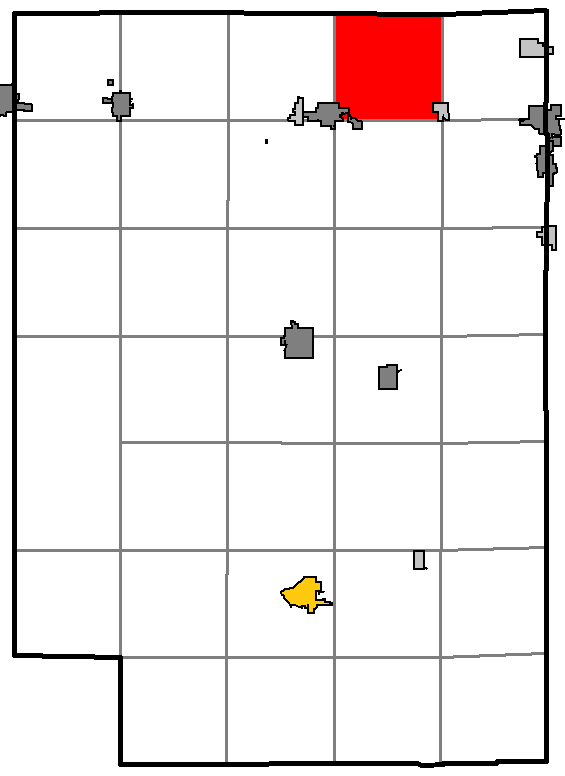
- Location of Hoard, Clark County

- Location of Clark County, Wisconsin
- Coordinates: 44°59′25″N 90°29′16″W
- Country: United States
- State: Wisconsin
- County: Clark

Area
  - Total: 35.3 sq mi (91.4 km^{2})
  - Land: 35.3 sq mi (91.4 km^{2})
  - Water: 0 sq mi (0.0 km^{2})
- Elevation: 1,339 ft (408 m)

Population (2020)
  - Total: 787
  - Density: 22.3/sq mi (8.61/km^{2})
- Time zone: UTC-6 (Central (CST))
  - Summer (DST): UTC-5 (CDT)
- Area codes: 715 & 534
- FIPS code: 55-35125
- GNIS feature ID: 1583398

Hoard is a town in Clark County in the U.S. state of Wisconsin. The population was 787 at the 2020 census.

== Geography ==
According to the United States Census Bureau, the town has a total area of 35.3 square miles (91.4 km^{2}), all land.

== Demographics ==
As of the census of 2000, there were 594 people, 170 households, and 146 families residing in the town. The population density was 16.8 people per square mile (6.5/km^{2}). There were 182 housing units at an average density of 5.2 per square mile (2.0/km^{2}). The racial makeup of the town was 97.64% White, 0.00% African American, 1.18% Native American, 0.00% Asian, 0.84% from other races, and 0.34% from two or more races. 1.35% of the population were Hispanic or Latino of any race.

There were 170 households, out of which 44.1% had children under the age of 18 living with them, 73.5% were married couples living together, 5.3% had a female householder with no husband present, and 14.1% were non-families. 10.6% of all households were made up of individuals, and 5.3% had someone living alone who was 65 years of age or older. The average household size was 3.49 and the average family size was 3.77.

In the town, the population was spread out, with 38.4% under the age of 18, 7.1% from 18 to 24, 26.3% from 25 to 44, 16.5% from 45 to 64, and 11.8% who were 65 years of age or older. The median age was 32 years. For every 100 females, there were 103.4 males. For every 100 females age 18 and over, there were 117.9 males.

The median income for a household in the town was $35,250, and the median income for a family was $37,639. Males had a median income of $24,545 versus $16,750 for females. The per capita income for the town was $12,273. About 15.2% of families and 14.8% of the population were below the poverty line, including 16.3% of those under age 18 and 23.0% of those age 65 or over.
