= Human Olfactory Data Explorer =

HORDE
Content
- Description: HORDE is a database of information about Olfactory Receptors
- Organisms: Mammals

Contact
- Research center: Weizmann Institute of Science

Access
- Website: genome.weizmann.ac.il/horde/

Miscellaneous
- Versioning: Last updated March 2011
- Version: 43

The Human Olfactory Data Explorer (HORDE) is a database of human olfactory receptors. The database provides information of the human olfactory receptor families, as well for dogs, platypuses, opossums and chimpanzees. The database is hosted at the Weizmann Institute of Science.
