= Nickolas Butler =

American novelist (born 1979)

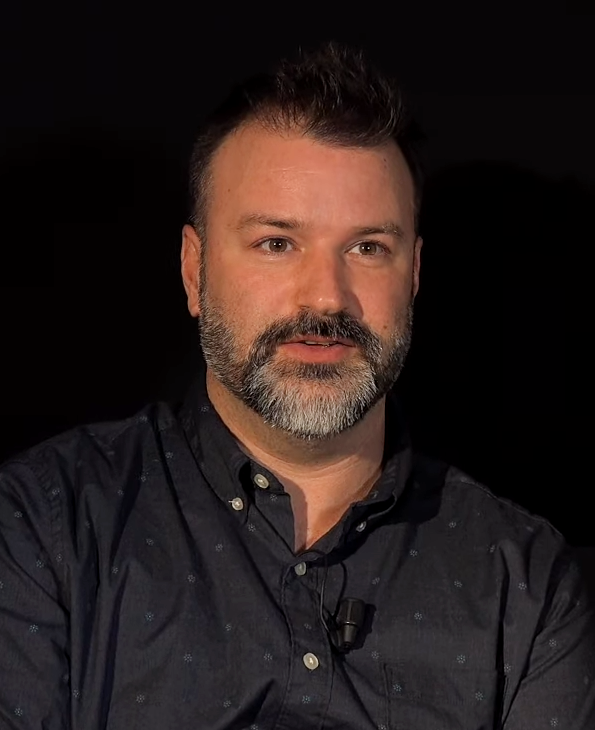
- Nickolas Butler in 2020
- Born: 1979 (age 46–47); Allentown, Pennsylvania, U.S.
- Education: University of Wisconsin–Madison; Iowa Writers' Workshop (MFA)
- Occupation: Writer
- Writing career
- Notable work: Shotgun Lovesongs (2014)
- Website: nickolasbutler.com

Nickolas Butler (born 1979) is an American novelist and short story author. He is the author of five novels: Shotgun Lovesongs (2014), The Hearts of Men (2017), Little Faith (2019), Godspeed (2021), and A Forty Year Kiss (2025). He also authored the short story collection Beneath the Bonfire (2015).

== Early life and education ==
Butler was born in Allentown, Pennsylvania. He was raised in Eau Claire, Wisconsin, where he attended Memorial High School. He attended high school alongside Justin Vernon, frontman of indie folk band Bon Iver. Butler's debut novel Shotgun Lovesongs (2014) was partly inspired by the creation of Bon Iver's debut album For Emma, Forever Ago (2007). Butler graduated with a bachelor's degree in English from the University of Wisconsin–Madison in 2002, and received an MFA from the Iowa Writers' Workshop in 2012. Prior to publishing Shotgun Lovesongs, Butler worked in coffee roasting, office management, meat packing, telemarketing, maintenance at Burger King, and as an author escort, liquor store clerk, hot-dog vendor, and bed-and-breakfast manager.

== Career ==
=== Literary career ===
Butler's debut novel, Shotgun Lovesongs (2014), was published to critical acclaim, including a review by Janet Maslin in The New York Times and a review by Jonathan Evison in The New York Times Book Review. In March 2013, Deadline Hollywood reported that Fox Searchlight Pictures acquired the film rights to Shotgun Lovesongs.

Butler has received literary prizes for his work and has published articles, reviews, short stories, and poetry in publications including Ploughshares, Narrative Magazine, and The New York Times Book Review, The Kenyon Review Online, The Christian Science Monitor, and Sixth Finch.

Butler is also a contributor to a local Wisconsin newspaper, The Country Today, where he shares stories and observations about life and events in western Wisconsin. From 2019 until 2024, he contributed to a column for the Eau Claire-based Leader-Telegram, called Sawdust Stories, which features stories all in or about the Chippewa Valley.

=== Political career ===
On May 20, 2024, Butler announced that he would run for a seat in the Wisconsin State Assembly. He sought to replace the retiring incumbent Warren Petryk, a Republican, in the 93rd district, which includes part of the west and south sides of the City of Eau Claire as well as rural portions of Eau Claire, Dunn, and Trempealeau counties. Butler was defeated in the primary by Christian Phelps.

== Personal life ==
Butler lives with his wife and two children on 16 acres of land in the town of Washington, Wisconsin.

== Electoral history ==
=== Wisconsin Assembly (2024) ===
District 93 Democratic primary
Party	Candidate	Votes	%
Democratic	Christian Phelps	4,580	51.74
Democratic	Nickolas Butler	4,267	48.20
Write-in		5	0.06
Total votes		8,852	100.0

== Awards and honors ==
- 2018 Friends of American Writers Literary Award
- 2016 Prix Médicis étranger, shortlist
- 2015 Wisconsin Library Association Literary Award
- 2015 UW–Whitewater Chancellor's Regional Literary Award
- 2014 Prix PAGE/America
- 2014 Great Lakes Great Reads Award
- 2014 Midwest Independent Booksellers Award
- 2014 Flaherty-Dunnan First Novel Prize, longlist
- 2014 Prix du roman Fnac, shortlist
- First Place in Narrative Magazine's Spring 2011 Story Contest for "Underneath the Bonfire"

== Bibliography ==
=== Novels ===
- Shotgun Lovesongs. Thomas Dunne Books. 2014. ISBN 978-1-250-03981-1.
- The Hearts of Men. Ecco. 2017. ISBN 978-0-06-246968-7.
- Little Faith. Ecco. 2019. ISBN 978-0-06-246971-7.
- Godspeed. G. P. Putnam's Sons. 2021. ISBN 978-0-593-19041-8.
- A Forty Year Kiss. Sourcebooks Landmark. 2025. ISBN 978-1-464-221-248.

=== Short story collections ===
- Beneath the Bonfire: Stories. Thomas Dunne Books. 2015. ISBN 978-1-250-03983-5.
  - "The Chainsaw Soirée"
  - "Rainwater"
  - "Sven & Lily"
  - "Morels"
  - "Leftovers"
  - "Beneath the Bonfire"
  - "Sweet Light Crude"
  - "In Western Counties"
  - "Train People Move Slow"
  - "Apples"

=== Short stories ===
- "The Chainsaw Soirée". The Kenyon Review Online (Summer 2011 ed.).
- "Underneath the Bonfire". Narrative Magazine (Fall 2011 ed.).
- "Leftovers". Narrative Magazine (Stories of the Week: 2012–2013 ed.).
- In Western Counties: A Short Story. Thomas Dunne Books. 2014. ISBN 978-1-4668-7857-0.

=== Poetry ===
- "Twenty or Thirty". Sixth Finch (Fall 2010 ed.).
- "For Samuel Mockbee". Terrain. No. 26 (Fall/Winter 2010 ed.).
- "Contradance in a Good Square or Circle". The New Verse News. October 8, 2009.

=== Nonfiction ===
- "Sweet Dreams of Denim". Volume One. January 14, 2010.
- "Death of a Mailbox". Wisconsin Life. April 16, 2014.
- "Leif Enger's New Novel Brims With Grace and Quirky Charm". The New York Times Book Review. November 2, 2018.
