= Allen, Wisconsin =

- Unincorporated community
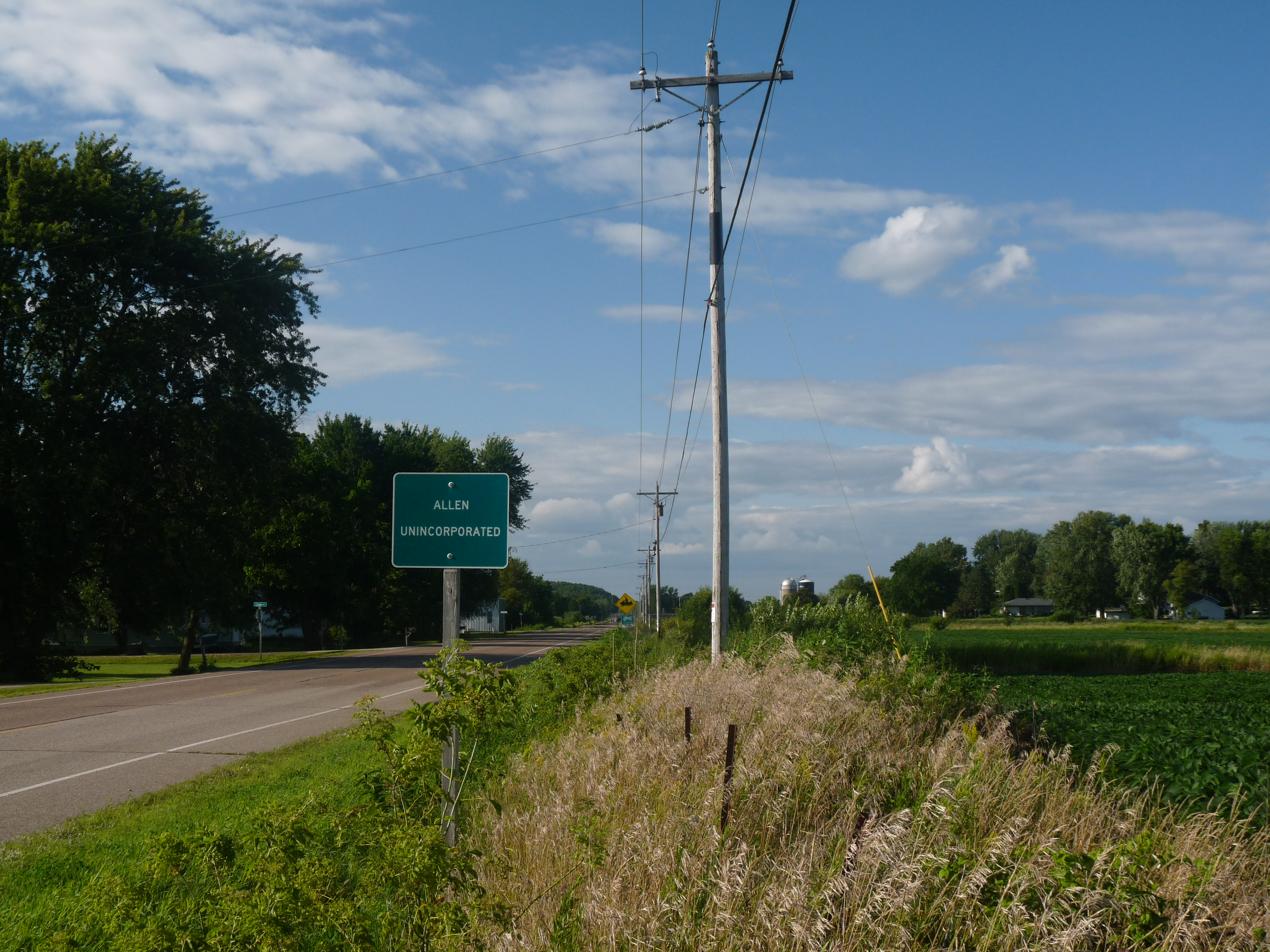
- Facing north on County D

- Location within Wisconsin Location within the United States
- Coordinates: 44°39′41″N 91°22′01″W
- Country: United States
- State: Wisconsin
- County: Eau Claire
- Elevation: 978 ft (298 m)
- Time zone: UTC-6 (Central (CST))
  - Summer (DST): UTC-5 (CDT)
- Area codes: 715 & 534
- GNIS feature ID: 1560767

Allen is an unincorporated community in the town of Clear Creek in Eau Claire County, Wisconsin, United States. It lies almost exactly midway between Cleghorn and Foster, at the southern junction of Eau Claire County Highways "D" and "V".

The town was built in 1913-1915 when the Fairchild and Northeastern Railroad passed through the community and a depot was built. The town was named after Charles Levi Allen, a commercial farmer who owned the land upon which the town was platted.
