= Hadleyville, Wisconsin =

- Former community
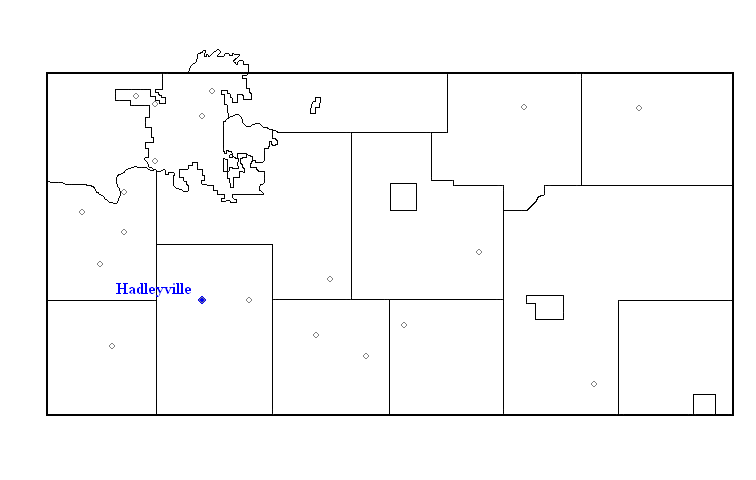
- Map of Eau Claire County, highlighting location of Hadleyville
- Coordinates: 44.68306°N 91.48889°W
- Country: United States
- State: Wisconsin
- County: Eau Claire

Hadleyville was an unincorporated community in Eau Claire County, Wisconsin, United States, located in the Town of Pleasant Valley just west of the modern junction of S. Lowes Creek Road and County Trunk Highway HH, two miles west of Wis. 93. Although older by several decades than nearby Cleghorn, three miles to the east, the community has long since ceased to exist.

In 1895, it had a population of 30 and a post office. Before its collapse as a result of the Great Depression, it had a population of several hundred. The Hadleyville Cemetery, on the south side of Eau Claire CTH "HH", about 1 block west of S. Lowes Creek Rd., is located across the road from what was formerly its general store.

All that remains today of the formerly bustling community is the cemetery, on a plot carved out of what is now a large dairying farm.
