= Mark D. Lewis =

American politician (born 1949)

President of the City Council of Eau Claire, Wisconsin
- In office April 21, 1993 – April 14, 1997
- Preceded by: Allan Hofland
- Succeeded by: William D. Nielsen Jr.

Member of the Wisconsin State Assembly
- In office January 7, 1985 – January 2, 1989
- Preceded by: David Travis
- Succeeded by: Jacquelyn J. Lahn
- Constituency: 93rd district
- In office January 3, 1983 – January 7, 1985
- Preceded by: Delmar DeLong
- Succeeded by: Wayne W. Wood
- Constituency: 44th district

Personal details
- Born: July 24, 1949 (age 77) Duluth, Minnesota, U.S.
- Party: Democratic
- Spouse: Connie
- Children: 1
- Education: University of Minnesota (B.S.)

Mark D. Lewis (born July 24, 1949) is a retired American businessman and Democratic politician. He served six years in the Wisconsin State Assembly (1983–1989), representing Eau Claire County and was later President of the Eau Claire City Council (1993–1997).

== Biography ==
Born in Duluth, Minnesota, he graduated from Duluth East High School in 1967. He attended the University of Colorado for two years but did not graduate, he later returned to school at the University of Minnesota, where he earned his bachelor's degree in 1977. While at Minnesota, Lewis became employed in the communications and advertising firm Kaufman Spicer & Co., and, after earning his bachelor's degree, he was assigned to the new Eau Claire, Wisconsin, office of the firm as vice president and general manager.

In the summer of 1978, he became involved in local politics, working as a spokesman for local property owners in a successful effort to remove parking meters from downtown Eau Claire. That fall, he announced a run for Eau Claire City Council for one of the at-large seats. In April 1979, he was elected to the City Council. While serving on the city council, Lewis became president of his own communications firm, Lewis Advertising and Communications, and was selected as president of the Eau Claire Area Convention and Tourism Bureau.

The court-ordered 1982 legislative redistricting plan divided the city of Eau Claire into two districts. Incumbent Joseph Looby, who had represented Eau Claire under the previous map, was now located in the 56th Assembly district, which contained the northern half of the city. The newly drawn 44th Assembly district, which contained the rest of the city, was an open seat. Lewis entered the race for Wisconsin State Assembly in the new 44th district. He defeated Richard Schlieve in the Democratic primary and went on to face Republican Marie Evans in the general election. The race was extremely close, and, following a recount, Lewis was declared the winner by 76 votes.

In 1983, the Legislature passed a new redistricting plan to supersede the court-ordered plan. The boundaries of Lewis's district were left largely intact, but the district was renumbered to the 93rd district. Lewis won election to two more terms in this district, but was defeated seeking reelection in 1988.

In 1993, he returned to the Eau Claire City Council when he was elected council president. He served four years and resigned in April 1997.

Wisconsin State Assembly
Preceded by Delmar DeLong	Member of the Wisconsin State Assembly from the 44th district January 3, 1983 – January 7, 1985	Succeeded by Wayne W. Wood
Preceded by David Travis	Member of the Wisconsin State Assembly from the 93rd district January 7, 1985 – January 2, 1989	Succeeded by Jacquelyn J. Lahn
