= David Travis =

American politician (born 1948)

Majority Leader of the Wisconsin Assembly
- In office January 7, 1991 – January 2, 1995
- Preceded by: Thomas A. Hauke
- Succeeded by: Scott Jensen

Member of the Wisconsin State Assembly
- In office January 7, 1985 – January 5, 2009
- Preceded by: Carol Roessler
- Succeeded by: Kelda Roys
- Constituency: 81st district
- In office January 3, 1983 – January 7, 1985
- Preceded by: Marlin Schneider
- Succeeded by: Mark D. Lewis
- Constituency: 93rd district
- In office January 1, 1979 – January 3, 1983
- Preceded by: Peter D. Bear
- Succeeded by: John T. Manske
- Constituency: 37th district

Personal details
- Born: September 21, 1948 (age 77)
- Party: Democratic
- Education: University of Wisconsin–Milwaukee (B.A.); University of Wisconsin–Madison (M.A.)
- Occupation: politician

David M. "Dave" Travis (born September 21, 1948) is a retired American communications consultant and Democratic politician. He served 30 years in the Wisconsin State Assembly, representing Dane County, and was majority leader of the Assembly from 1991 to 1995.

== Biography ==
Travis was born September 21, 1948. He earned his bachelor's degree from University of Wisconsin–Milwaukee and went on to earn his master's from the Robert M. La Follette School of Public Affairs at the University of Wisconsin–Madison. He also attended Madison Area Technical College and Bindl Flight School, in Waunakee, Wisconsin, where he earned a private pilot's license.

After receiving his bachelor's degree, Travis went to work as an administrative assistant for the Wisconsin Senate Democratic Caucus. By 1974, he had risen to become staff director for the caucus.

In 1978, incumbent assemblymember Peter D. Bear announced he would run for Wisconsin State Senate, creating a vacancy in Wisconsin's 37th Assembly district. Travis decided to run in the Democratic primary, and prevailed in a field of five candidates that included future Wisconsin Senate Democratic leader Charles Chvala.

Over the next five years, Wisconsin would go through two significant redistrictings. In 1982, after the Legislature and Governor failed to agree on a map reflecting the 1980 United States census, a federal court ordered the implementation of their own map, which was designed to punish incumbent legislators. Travis' district shifted from a mostly urban district on Madison's north side to the new 93rd Assembly district, which was composed of most of northwestern Dane County. He survived a competitive general election and returned to office in 1983, where the new Legislature set about creating a new redistricting plan to override the court-ordered plan. Under the new map, Travis resided in the new 81st Assembly district, which would be his constituency for the remainder of his career. He was re-elected twelve more times in the 81st district.

Travis announced in May 2007 that he would not run for a 16th term in the Assembly.

Wisconsin State Assembly
Preceded by Peter D. Bear	Member of the Wisconsin State Assembly from the 37th district January 1, 1979 – January 3, 1983	Succeeded by John T. Manske
Preceded by Marlin Schneider	Member of the Wisconsin State Assembly from the 93rd district January 3, 1983 – January 7, 1985	Succeeded by Mark D. Lewis
Preceded by Carol Roessler	Member of the Wisconsin State Assembly from the 81st district January 7, 1985 – January 5, 2009	Succeeded by Kelda Roys
Preceded by Thomas A. Hauke	Majority Leader of the Wisconsin State Assembly; January 7, 1991 – January 2, 1995	Succeeded by Scott Jensen
