= Jacquelyn J. Lahn =

American politician

Member of the Wisconsin State Assembly from the 93rd district
- In office January 2, 1989 – January 7, 1991
- Preceded by: Mark D. Lewis
- Succeeded by: Joseph C. Hisrich

Personal details
- Born: August 3, 1952 (age 74) Eau Claire, Wisconsin, U.S.
- Party: Republican
- Spouse: married
- Occupation: real estate appraiser

Military service
- Allegiance: United States
- Branch/service: United States Army
- Years of service: 1972–1977

Jacquelyn J. Lahn (born August 3, 1952) is a retired American real estate appraiser and Republican politician. She served one term in the Wisconsin State Assembly (1989–1991), representing Eau Claire County.

== Biography ==
Lahn was born on August 3, 1952, in Eau Claire, Wisconsin, and attended Osseo-Fairchild High School. She attended the University of Wisconsin–Eau Claire and served in the United States Army from 1972 to 1977.

== Political career ==
Lahn was elected to the Assembly in 1988. She is a Republican.

Wisconsin State Assembly
Preceded by Mark D. Lewis	Member of the Wisconsin State Assembly from the 93rd district January 2, 1989 – January 7, 1991	Succeeded by Joseph C. Hisrich
