= Wisconsin's 93rd Assembly district =

American legislative district in westrern Wisconsin

Wisconsin's 93rd State Assembly district
- 2024 map defined in 2023 Wisc. Act 94; 2022 map defined in Johnson v. Wisconsin Elections Commission; 2011 map was defined in 2011 Wisc. Act 43
Assemblymember
Christian Phelps; D–Eau Claire
since January 6, 2025 (1 years)
- Demographics: 89.96% White; 1.37% Black; 2.37% Hispanic; 4.28% Asian; 1.48% Native American; 0.13% Hawaiian/Pacific Islander
- Population (2020) • Voting age: 59,422; 47,696
- Website: Official website
- Notes: Western Wisconsin

The 93rd Assembly district of Wisconsin is one of 99 districts in the Wisconsin State Assembly. Located in western Wisconsin, the district comprises parts of western Eau Claire County, northern Trempealeau County, and southeast Dunn County. It includes the western half of the city of Eau Claire, along with the city of Osseo and the villages of Eleva and Strum. It contains landmarks such as the University of Wisconsin–Eau Claire campus, the Eau Claire campus of Chippewa Valley Technical College, Carson Park, and Water Street Historic District. The district is represented by Democrat Christian Phelps, since January 2025.

The 93rd Assembly district is located within Wisconsin's 31st Senate district, along with the 91st and 92nd Assembly districts.

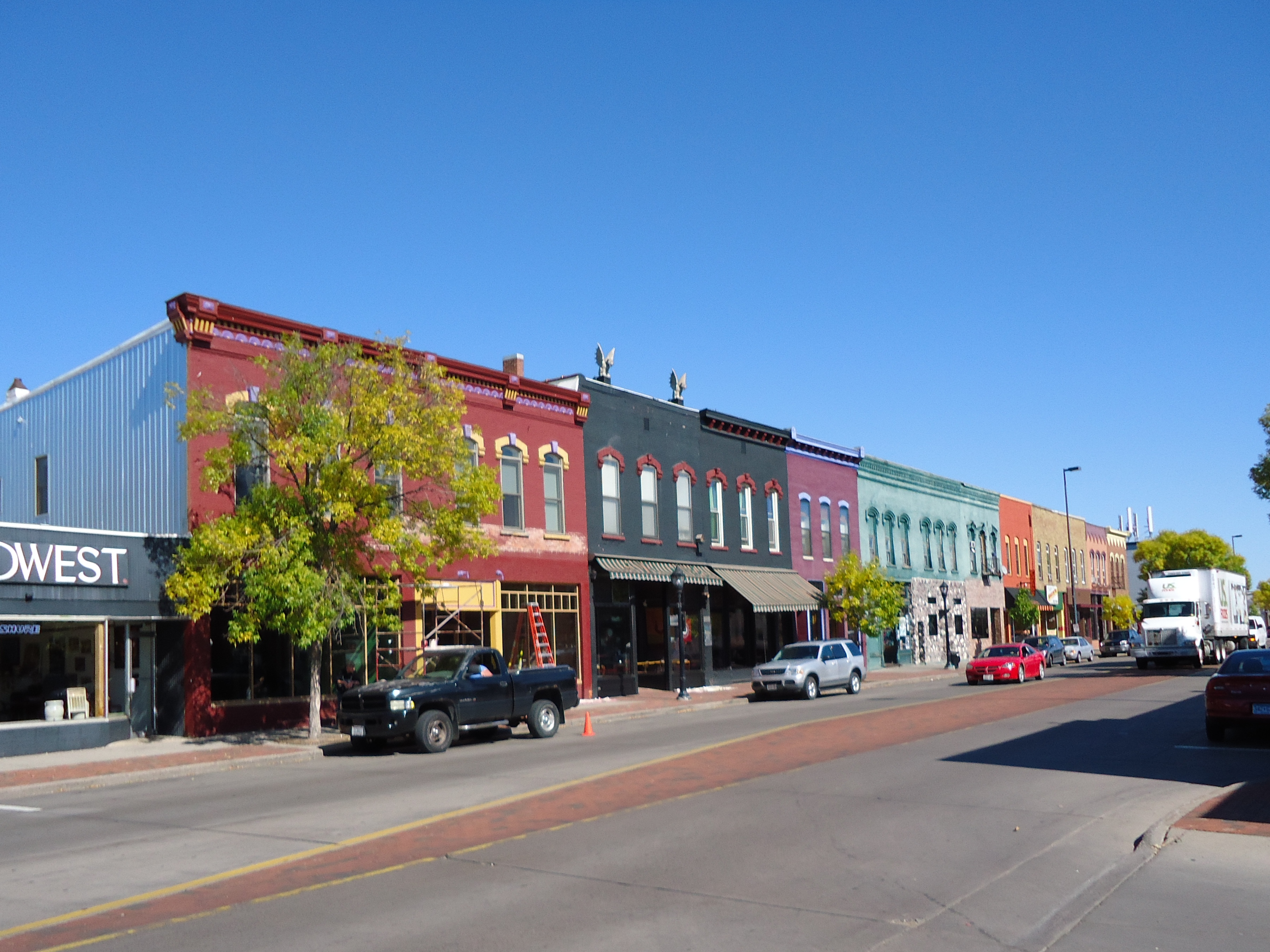
Water Street Historic District

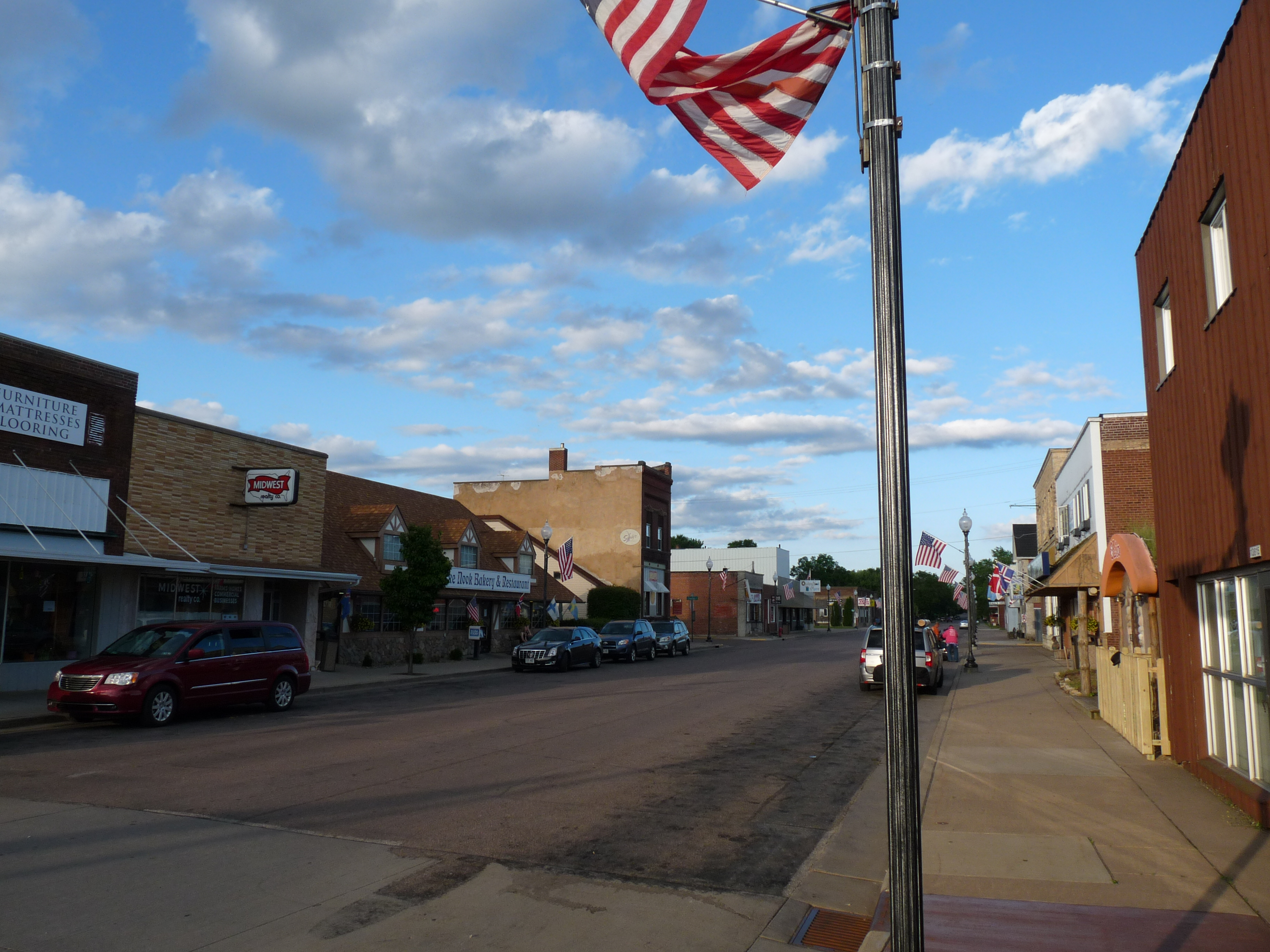
Downtown Osseo

== List of past representatives ==
List of representatives to the Wisconsin State Assembly from the 93rd district
Member	Party	Residence	Counties represented	Term start	Term end	Ref.
District created
Marlin Schneider	Dem.	Wisconsin Rapids	Adams, Juneau, Waushara, Wood	January 1, 1973	January 3, 1983	
David Travis	Dem.	Madison	Dane	January 3, 1983	January 7, 1985	
Mark D. Lewis	Dem.	Eau Claire	Eau Claire	January 7, 1985	January 2, 1989	
Jacquelyn J. Lahn	Rep.	Clear Creek	Eau Claire	January 2, 1989	January 7, 1991	
Joseph C. Hisrich	Dem.	Eau Claire	Eau Claire	January 7, 1991	January 4, 1993	
Robin Kreibich	Rep.	Eau Claire	Eau Claire	January 4, 1993	January 1, 2007	
Robin Kreibich	Rep.	Eau Claire	Dunn, Eau Claire, Pepin, Pierce	January 4, 1993	January 1, 2007	
Jeff Smith	Dem.	Eau Claire	Dunn, Eau Claire, Pepin, Pierce	January 1, 2007	January 3, 2011	
Warren Petryk	Rep.	Washington	Dunn, Eau Claire, Pepin, Pierce	January 3, 2011	January 6, 2025	
Warren Petryk	Rep.	Washington	Buffalo, Dunn, Eau Claire, Pepin, Pierce	January 3, 2011	January 6, 2025	
Warren Petryk	Rep.	Washington	Dunn, Eau Claire, Pepin, Pierce	January 3, 2011	January 6, 2025	
Christian Phelps	Dem.	Eau Claire	Dunn, Eau Claire, Trempealeau	January 6, 2025	Current	
