= Robin Kreibich =

American politician

Rob Kreibich

Member of the Wisconsin State Assembly
- Incumbent
- Assumed office January 6, 2025
- Preceded by: Gae Magnafici
- Constituency: 28th Assembly district
- In office January 4, 1993 – January 3, 2007
- Preceded by: Joseph C. Hisrich
- Succeeded by: Jeff Smith
- Constituency: 93rd Assembly district

Personal details
- Born: June 4, 1959 (age 67) Wabasha, Minnesota, U.S.
- Party: Republican
- Spouse: Malinda (div.)
- Children: 3
- Education: University of Minnesota (B.A.)
- Occupation: Politician, news reporter, businessman
- Website: Official website Campaign website

Robin G. "Rob" Kreibich (born June 4, 1959) is an American businessman and Republican politician from New Richmond, Wisconsin. He is a member of the Wisconsin State Assembly, representing Wisconsin's 28th Assembly district since January 2025. He previously served 14 years in the Wisconsin State Assembly, from January 1993 until January 2007, representing Wisconsin's 93rd Assembly district.

== Early life and career ==
Kreibich was born in Wabasha, Minnesota, but later moved to River Falls, Wisconsin. He graduated from River Falls high school and initially attended the University of Wisconsin–River Falls in 1979. He then attended the Brown Institute, a for-profit college in Minnesota, from 1981 to 1982, when he graduated. He then decided to attend the University of Minnesota, where he got a B.A. in journalism.

In 1986, Kreibich began working for WEAU-TV after moving into Eau Claire. As part of his work as a reporter, he accompanied the New Richmond High School Marching Band on its trip to the Soviet Union as part of his work as a reporter for WEAU. He left WEAU in 1992. During his time in Eau Claire he was a member of the Eau Claire Chamber of Commerce.

== Political career ==
=== State Legislature ===
In 1992, Kreibich began first campaign for public office, running against incumbent representative and Democrat Joseph C. Hisrich. During the campaign, Kreibich attacked Hisrich for drawing both a legislative salary and a salary from the University of Wisconsin–Eau Claire. Kreibich also proposed various reforms to Wisconsin's tax law, supporting efforts to provide property tax relief and job creation. Kreibich defeated Hisrich by a 19 point margin and took office January 4, 1993.

In 2006, Kreibich proposed a plan to reform the University of Wisconsin System, which would guarantee Wisconsin high school graduates admission to any University of Wisconsin campus. This guarantee was on the condition that said students complete three years of math and science classes, graduate in the top 10% of their class, and score a 25 or higher on the ACT. The proposal was meant to ensure easier access to the UW system, but was criticized as being unlikely to make higher education more affordable.

In the 2006 election, Kreibich was defeated by Democrat Jeff Smith.

=== Out of office ===
Following his defeat, Kreibich moved to Marshfield, Wisconsin, working for the Marshfield Clinic as a Public Relations Specialist between 2007 until 2014, when he moved back to New Richmond, Wisconsin. In 2014, the New Richmond Chamber of Commerce selected Kreibich as its executive director.

In 2017, Kreibich was appointed to the Wisconsin 529 College Savings Program Board and served in this capacity until 2021.

=== Return to office ===
Due to the 2024 redistricting, incumbent Republican Gae Magnafici was drawn out of her district, being left within the new 75th district. Instead of running for re-election in either the new 28th district or new 75th district, she decided to retire. On March 26, 2024, Kreibich announced he would run for the 28th Assembly district to succeed Magnafici in the 2024 Wisconsin State Assembly election. Another Republican, Brady Penfield, a student as the University of Wisconsin–River Falls, also ran for the Republican nomination. During the campaign Penfield ran to the right of Kreibich on various issues, but in the primary election, Kreibich won a narrow 45 vote victory over Penfield. He then advanced to the general election, where he defeated Democrat Danielle Johnson by a wide margin.

Kreibich took office on January 7, 2025.

== Personal life ==
Kreibich was once married to Malinda Kreibich, but they are now divorced, they had three children together.

== Electoral history ==
=== Wisconsin Assembly, 93rd district (1992–2006) ===
Year	Election	Date	Elected				Defeated				Total	Plurality
1992	General	Nov. 3	Robin G. Kreibich	Republican	16,876	59.77%	Joseph C. Hisrich (inc)	Dem.	11,357	40.23%	23,411	5,519
1994	General	Nov. 8	Rob Kreibich (inc)	Republican	10,635	64.38%	Susan Miller	Dem.	5,885	35.62%	16,520	4,750
1996	General	Nov. 5	Rob Kreibich (inc)	Republican	14,480	59.15%	Rich Postlewaite	Dem.	10,000	40.85%	24,480	4,480
1998	General	Nov. 3	Rob Kreibich (inc)	Republican	11,732	64.85%	Pamela Wachs-Baily	Dem.	6,742	35.15%	18,524	4,490
2000	General	Nov. 7	Rob Kreibich (inc)	Republican	18,234	62.58%	Duncan Cameron	Dem.	10,844	37.22%	29,138	7,390
2002	General	Nov. 5	Rob Kreibich (inc)	Republican	13,858	98.10%	--Unopposed--				14,126	13,590
2004	General	Nov. 2	Rob Kreibich (inc)	Republican	16,997	52.23%	Jeff Smith	Dem.	15,501	47.63%	32,543	1,496
2006	General	Nov. 7	Jeff Smith	Democratic	11,872	50.62%	Rob Kreibich (inc)	Rep.	11,565	49.31%	23,452	307

=== Wisconsin Assembly, 28th district (2024, 2026) ===
Year	Election	Date	Elected				Defeated				Total	Plurality
2024	Primary	Aug. 13	Rob Kreibich	Republican	2,888	50.30%	Brady Penfield	Rep.	2,843	49.53%	5,741	45
2024	General	Nov. 5	Rob Kreibich	Republican	23,979	66.14%	Danielle Johnson	Dem.	12,245	33.77%	36,256	11,734

Wisconsin State Assembly
Preceded by Joseph C. Hisrich	Member of the Wisconsin State Assembly from the 93rd district January 4, 1993 – January 3, 2007	Succeeded by Jeff Smith
Preceded by Gae Magnafici	Member of the Wisconsin State Assembly from the 28th district January 6, 2025 – present	Incumbent
