= Joseph C. Hisrich =

American politician

Joseph Hisrich

Member of the Wisconsin State Assembly from the 93rd district
- In office January 7, 1991 – January 4, 1993
- Preceded by: Jacquelyn J. Lahn
- Succeeded by: Robin Kreibich

Personal details
- Born: July 10, 1942 (age 84) Dover, Ohio, U.S.
- Party: Democratic
- Spouse: married
- Children: 2
- Education: St. Fidelis College Seminary; Loyola University Chicago
- Occupation: teacher

Joseph C. Hisrich (born July 10, 1942) is a retired American educator and Democratic politician. He was a member of the Wisconsin State Assembly representing Eau Claire County, serving one term from 1991–1993.

== Biography ==
Born in Dover, Ohio, Hisrich received his bachelor's degree from St. Fidelis College Seminary, in Herman, Pennsylvania, in 1965. He then received his master's degree from Loyola University Chicago, in 1967. He taught sociology at University of Wisconsin–Eau Claire and was a student service specialist. He also taught in junior high school. Hisrich served on the Eau Claire County Board of Supervisors from 1983 to 1990 and also served on the Eau Claire City/County Board of Health. He was elected to the Wisconsin State Assembly in 1990, serving in 1991 and 1992. In October 2001, Hisrich retired from University of Wisconsin–Eau Claire. Since leaving office, Hisrich has retired to Fort Myers, Florida.
