= Christian Phelps =

21st century American politician

Member of the Wisconsin State Assembly from the 93rd district
- Incumbent
- Assumed office January 6, 2025
- Preceded by: Warren Petryk

Personal details
- Born: October 13, 1993 (age 32) Eau Claire, Wisconsin, U.S.
- Party: Democratic
- Education: Vassar College (A.B.); Cardiff University (M.A.)
- Occupation: Educator, journalist
- Website: Campaign website

Christian Phelps (born October 13, 1993) is an American educator, journalist, activist, and Democratic politician from Eau Claire, Wisconsin. He has served as a member of the Wisconsin State Assembly, representing Wisconsin's 93rd Assembly district since 2025.

== Early life and career ==
Christian Phelps was born and raised in Eau Claire, Wisconsin, graduating from Memorial High School in 2012. He competed in cross country running and tennis, twice earning First Team All-State honors in tennis. He became active in politics while in high school, participating in demonstrations against 2011 Wisconsin Act 10—the signature law pushed by then-governor Scott Walker.

After graduating from high school, he attended Vassar College and earned his bachelor's degree in urban studies in 2016. He competed in tennis for three years and was awarded numerous honors. After college he returned to Wisconsin, working for two years in Madison, Wisconsin, as a special education paraprofessional in the Madison public schools. During that time, he was a member of the Madison teachers' union, Madison Teachers Incorporated. He then continued his education through Cardiff University, completing his master's degree in international journalism in 2020.

After completing his master's degree, Phelps returned to Eau Claire, and began working as a digital organizing and communications director for the Wisconsin Public Education Network, a non-profit which promotes policies supporting public school education in Wisconsin. During these years, Phelps has also worked as a freelance journalist, contributing content to platforms such as the Leader-Telegram, UpNorthNews, the Wisconsin Examiner, Nation.Cymru, and WORT.

== Political career ==
On April 3, 2024, Phelps announced his first bid for public office, running for Wisconsin State Assembly in the 93rd Assembly district as a Democrat. Earlier that year, Wisconsin had undergone a major redistricting after the Wisconsin Supreme Court struck down the decade-old Republican legislative gerrymander. The 93rd Assembly district was significantly affected by the redistricting. The district had previously stretched from the outskirts of Eau Claire 75 miles west to Prescott, Wisconsin, on the western border of the state; the new distrtict comprised more of the south side of the city of Eau Claire, including the campus of the University of Wisconsin–Eau Claire, but still contained wide rural areas of Dunn, Eau Claire, and Trempealeau counties. The district was projected to be highly competitive in the 2024 election, and the incumbent Republican representative, Warren Petryk, announced he would not run for an eighth term.

Before reaching the general election, however, Phelps faced a difficult Democratic Party primary against author Nickolas Butler. After an active primary, Phelps prevailed by just 313 votes. In the general election, Phelps defeated Republican James Rolbiecki, a real estate developer and member of the town board of Washington, taking 52.8% of the vote. Phelps took office in January, 2025.

Following his election, Phelps joined the Socialist Caucus. In the legislature, Phelps is a member of the Democratic Caucus, the Socialist Caucus, and vice-chair of the LGBTQ+ Caucus, and the Committees on Education and Public Benefit Reform.

== Electoral history ==
=== Wisconsin Assembly (2024) ===
Wisconsin Assembly, 93rd District Election, 2024
Party	Candidate	Votes	%	±%
Democratic Primary, August 13, 2024
Democratic	Christian Phelps	4,580	51.74%	
Democratic	Nickolas Butler	4,267	48.20%	
	Scattering	5	0.06%	
Plurality		313	3.54%	
Total votes		8,852	100.0%	
General Election, November 5, 2024
Democratic	Christian Phelps	18,474	52.72%	+12.49pp
Republican	James Rolbiecki	16,527	47.16%	−12.58pp
	Scattering	43	0.12%	
Plurality		1,947	5.56%	-13.96pp
Total votes		35,044	100.0%	+30.83%
Democratic gain from Republican				

Wisconsin State Assembly
Preceded by Warren Petryk	Member of the Wisconsin State Assembly from the 93rd district January 6, 2025 – present	Incumbent
