= Nix Corner, Wisconsin =

- Unincorporated community
- Location within Wisconsin Location within the United States
- Coordinates: 44°38′48″N 91°20′50″W
- Country: United States
- State: Wisconsin
- County: Eau Claire
- Elevation: 1,066 ft (325 m)
- Time zone: UTC-6 (Central (CST))
  - Summer (DST): UTC-5 (CDT)
- Area codes: 715 & 534
- GNIS feature ID: 1846716

Nix Corner is an unincorporated community in the town of Clear Creek, Eau Claire County, Wisconsin, United States.

== History ==
In 1871 Andrew Nix immigrated from Germany to Eau Claire County, Wisconsin. Finding very favorable conditions for starting a new life in America he wrote to encourage his half brother, John Hubert Nix, to also immigrate to America. John and his wife, Anna Marie, followed Andrew in 1873. Both Andrew and John bought farmland in Eau Claire County adjacent to each other. Being devout Catholics and having no church available to their vicinity, John built a church on his land near his home. The church attracted other Catholics living on the surrounding farms to Sunday services and John Nix' home became a hub for what evolved into a scattered informal farm community. John's house, being at a crossroads, inspired the name for this community, "Nix Corners."
