= Jeff Smith (Wisconsin politician) =

21st century American politician (born 1955)

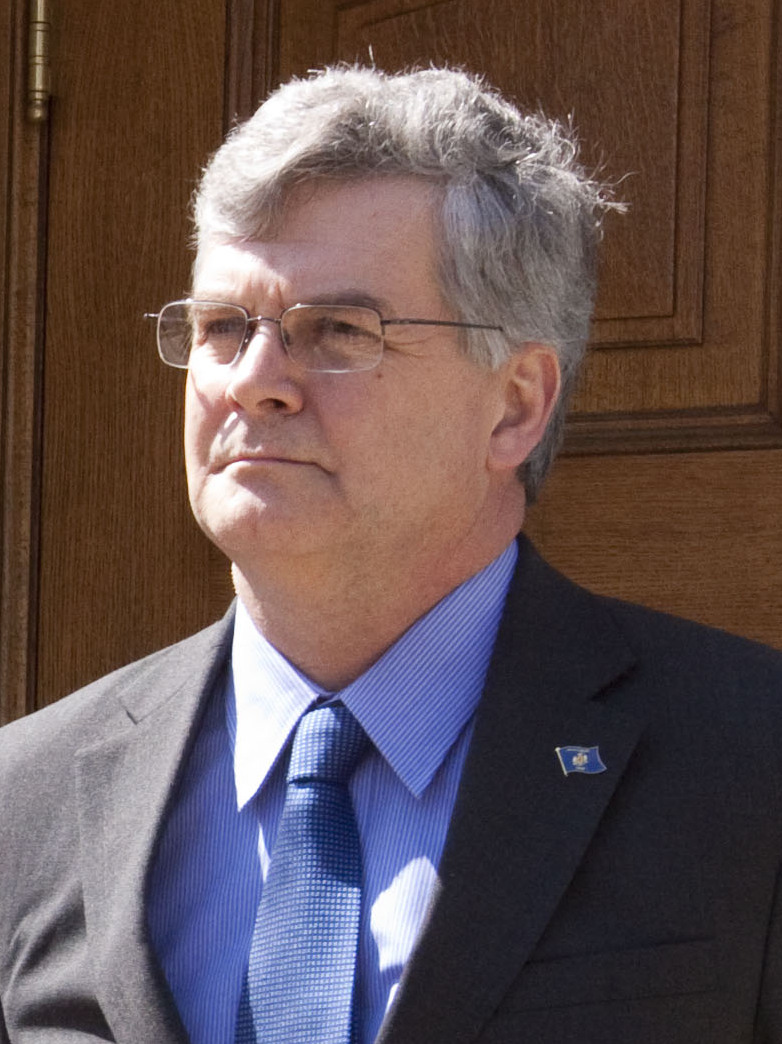
- Smith in 2009

Member of the Wisconsin Senate from the 31st district
- Incumbent
- Assumed office January 7, 2019
- Preceded by: Kathleen Vinehout

Member of the Wisconsin State Assembly from the 93rd district
- In office January 3, 2007 – January 3, 2011
- Preceded by: Robin Kreibich
- Succeeded by: Warren Petryk

Personal details
- Born: March 15, 1955 (age 71) Eau Claire, Wisconsin, U.S.
- Party: Democratic
- Spouse: Susan
- Children: 2
- Occupation: Former small business owner

Jeffrey Edward Smith (born March 15, 1955) is an American Democratic politician and former small business owner from Eau Claire, Wisconsin. He has served as a member of the Wisconsin Senate, representing the 31st Senate district since 2019. He previously served in the Wisconsin State Assembly, from 2007 to 2011.

== Early life ==
Jeff Smith was born in Eau Claire, Wisconsin, and has lived nearly his entire life in the Eau Claire area. He graduated from Eau Claire's North High School in 1973 and then took up his father's window-cleaning company, which he ran until he sold it in 2011.

== Political career ==
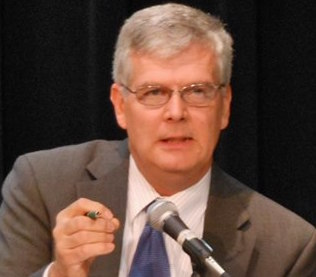
Smith in 2014

Smith served on the town board for the Town of Brunswick and was chair of the board. He founded the Parent Advisory Committee for the Eau Claire School District. Because of that work, he was appointed by Governor Jim Doyle to serve on the Task Force on Educational Excellence in 2003. Smith also served as the co-chair of the Eau Claire County Democratic Party. He is a member of the Eau Claire Area Chamber of Commerce and Wisconsin League of Conservation Voters.

Smith was elected to the Wisconsin State Assembly in 2006, unseating the Republican incumbent Robin Kreibich. He was the chair of the Elections and Campaign Reform Committee and a member of five other committees: Colleges and Universities, Financial Institutions, Education, Renewable Energy and Rural Affairs, and Public Safety.

Smith sponsored Assembly Bill 119, which established five-year-old Kindergarten as a prerequisite to first grade in public and charter schools; Assembly Bill 250, which created licensing requirements for dog sellers and animal shelters, and Assembly Bill 276, which divided the UW System Board of Regents into seven geographical districts.

Based on lifetime voting records on gun issues and the results of a questionnaire sent to all Congressional candidates in 2008, the NRA Political Victory Fund assigned Smith a grade of C (with grades ranging from a high of A+ to a low of F). Based on a point system, with points assigned for actions in support of or in opposition to the AFL-CIO, Smith received a rating of 100. NARAL Pro-Choice Wisconsin gave Smith a rating of one-hundred percent on abortion-related issues. In 2010, Smith earned a 100% rating from the Wisconsin League of Conservation voters.

In February 2010, Smith received a Humane State Legislator award from the Humane Society of the United States, which recognized him for his efforts to pass The Dog Breeders Licensure Bill, which regulates large-scale puppy breeding operations, commonly referred to as "puppy mills."

=== Democratic party chair candidacy ===
In 2015, Smith was a candidate for chair of the Democratic Party of Wisconsin (DPW), facing Jason Rae, Martha Laning, Joe Wineke, and Stephen Smith. If elected DPW Chair, Smith said he’d make it a priority to engage county parties and empower them to be more proactive.

During the campaign, Smith's campaign penned a letter that criticized Laning for her lack of experience and offered her the post of DPW Executive Director if Smith were to be elected chair. Laning publicly stated that she had refused Smith’s offer and criticized Smith for mentioning the offer in campaign literature. Shortly after the letter controversy, Smith wrote an open letter dropping out of the race and asking his supporters to support Laning.

== Electoral history ==
=== Wisconsin Assembly (2004–2014) ===
Year	Election	Date	Elected				Defeated				Total	Plurality
2004	Primary	Sep. 14	Jeff Smith	Democratic	1,617	55.51%	Howard White	Dem.	1,292	44.35%	2,913	325
2004	General	Nov. 2	Robin Kreibich (inc.)	Republican	16,997	52.23%	Jeff Smith	Dem.	15,501	47.63%	32,543	1,496
2006	Primary	Sep. 12	Jeff Smith	Democratic	2,677	50.40%	Judy Reas	Dem.	2,635	49.60%	5,312	42
2006	General	Nov. 7	Jeff Smith	Democratic	11,872	50.62%	Robin Kreibich (inc.)	Rep.	11,565	49.31%	23,452	307
2008	General	Nov. 4	Jeff Smith (inc.)	Democratic	19,276	59.35%	Darcy Fields	Rep.	13,161	40.52%	32,479	6,115
2010	General	Nov. 2	Warren Petryk	Republican	11,080	50.12%	Jeff Smith (inc.)	Dem.	11,006	49.79%	22,105	74
2012	General	Nov. 6	Warren Petryk (inc.)	Republican	15,612	50.78%	Jeff Smith	Dem.	15,114	49.16%	30,742	498
2014	General	Nov. 4	Warren Petryk (inc.)	Republican	13,367	55.40%	Jeff Smith	Dem.	10,749	44.55%	24,130	2,618

=== Wisconsin Senate (2018–present) ===
Year	Election	Date	Elected				Defeated				Total	Plurality
2018	Primary	Aug. 14	Jeff Smith	Democratic	8,643	49.94%	Steve Boe	Dem.	4,503	26.02%	17,307	4,140
2018	Primary	Aug. 14	Jeff Smith	Democratic	8,643	49.94%	Jon W. Schultz	Dem.	4,151	23.98%	17,307	4,140
2018	General	Nov. 6	Jeff Smith	Democratic	40,073	51.67%	Mel Pittman	Rep.	35,684	46.01%	77,561	4,389
2018	General	Nov. 6	Jeff Smith	Democratic	40,073	51.67%	Aaron Elaine Camacho	Grn.	1,776	2.29%	77,561	4,389
2022	General	Nov. 8	Jeff Smith (inc.)	Democratic	38,936	50.42%	David Estenson	Rep.	38,239	49.52%	77,223	697

Wisconsin State Assembly
Preceded by Robin Kreibich	Member of the Wisconsin State Assembly from the 93rd district January 3, 2007 – January 3, 2011	Succeeded by Warren Petryk
Wisconsin Senate
Preceded by Kathleen Vinehout	Member of the Wisconsin Senate from the 31st district January 7, 2019 – present	Incumbent
