= Cleghorn, Wisconsin =

- Unincorporated community
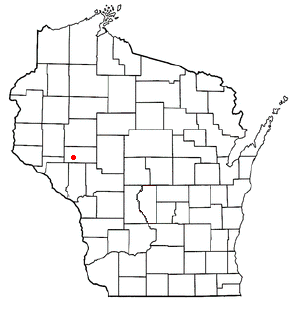
- Location of Cleghorn in Wisconsin
- Coordinates: 44°41′01″N 91°25′37″W
- Country: United States
- State: Wisconsin
- County: Eau Claire
- Elevation: 961 ft (293 m)
- Time zone: UTC-6 (Central (CST))
  - Summer (DST): UTC-5 (CDT)
- Area codes: 715 & 534
- GNIS feature ID: 1563173

Cleghorn is an unincorporated community in the east-central part of the town of Pleasant Valley in Eau Claire County, Wisconsin, United States, approximately six miles south of Eau Claire. Cleghorn is located one mile east of Wis. 93 along Eau Claire County Highway "HH", at the junction of "HH", "I", and "V". The now-extinct community of Hadleyville lies approximately three miles to the west, along Eau Claire County Highway "HH". Clegorn was once the home of Cleghorn Elementary School. Cleghorn school was a small school located in the center of town. Cleghorn school was shut down in 2003. After the school was torn down, a park pavilion was built, and Cleghorn community park established in 2006. Every year, community members hold a Cleghorn Harvest Festival. This festival has a softball tournament, parade, old fashion car show, craft show, and bike race. Cleghorn, Wisconsin is mentioned in the 2024 movie Beetlejuice Beetlejuice.

== Government ==
The community is the site of the town's administration.

== History ==
Cleghorn was named after Lewis Cleghorn, one of its early settlers. In 1913 the now-defunct Foster Railroad was extended from Foster through Allen as far as Cleghorn.
