= Pleasant Valley, Eau Claire County, Wisconsin =

Pleasant Valley, Wisconsin
- Town
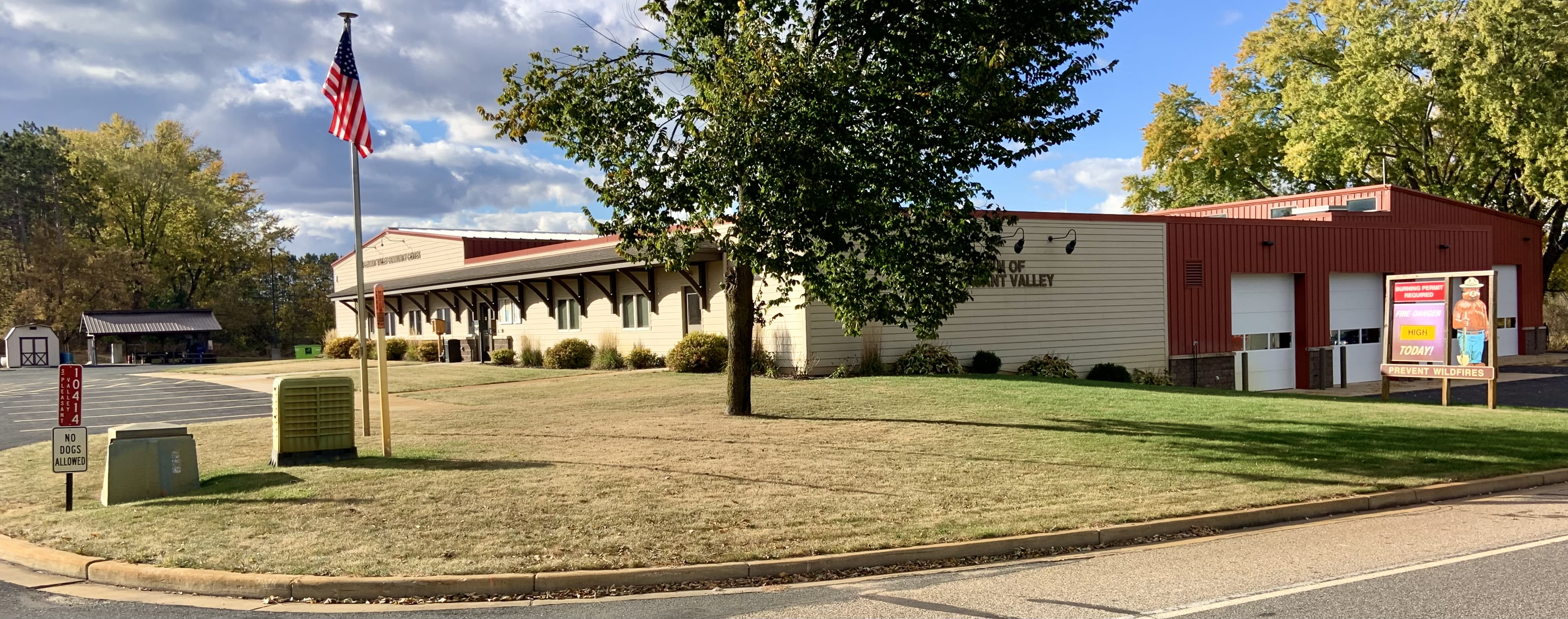
- Town hall

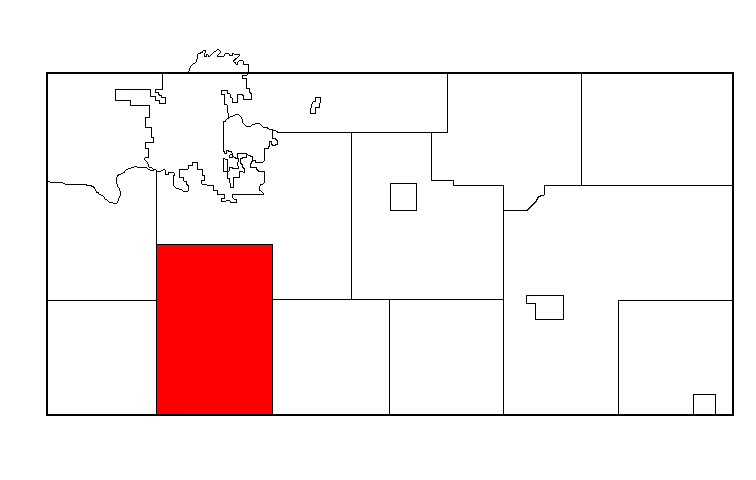
- Location of Pleasant Valley within Eau Claire County

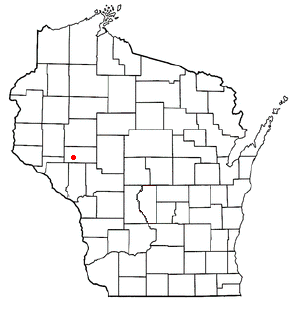
- Location of Pleasant Valley, Wisconsin
- Coordinates: 44°40′13″N 91°28′0″W
- Country: United States
- State: Wisconsin
- County: Eau Claire

Area
  - Total: 54.2 sq mi (140.4 km^{2})
  - Land: 54.2 sq mi (140.4 km^{2})
  - Water: 0 sq mi (0.0 km^{2})
- Elevation: 961 ft (293 m)

Population (2020)
  - Total: 3,791
  - Density: 69.93/sq mi (27.00/km^{2})
- Time zone: UTC-6 (Central (CST))
  - Summer (DST): UTC-5 (CDT)
- Area codes: 715 & 534
- FIPS code: 55-63400
- GNIS feature ID: 1583938
- Website: https://pleasantvalleywi.gov/

Pleasant Valley is a town in Eau Claire County, Wisconsin, United States. The population was 3,791 at the 2020 census. The town government is headquartered in the unincorporated community of Cleghorn. The remains of the historic community of Hadleyville are also located in the town.

== Geography ==
According to the United States Census Bureau, the town has a total area of 54.2 square miles (140.4 km^{2}), all land.

== Demographics ==
Historical population
Census	Pop.	Note	%±
1940	911		—
1950	1,159		27.2%
1960	1,164		0.4%
1970	1,497		28.6%
1980	1,840		22.9%
1990	2,076		12.8%
2000	2,681		29.1%
2010	3,044		13.5%
2020	3,791		24.5%

As of the census of 2000, there were 2,681 people, 919 households, and 779 families residing in the town. The population density was 49.5 people per square mile (19.1/km^{2}). There were 931 housing units at an average density of 17.2 per square mile (6.6/km^{2}). The racial makeup of the town was 97.84% White, 0.30% Native American, 1.08% Asian, 0.60% from other races, and 0.19% from two or more races. Hispanic or Latino of any race were 1.27% of the population.

There were 919 households, out of which 42.7% had children under the age of 18 living with them, 77.8% were married couples living together, 3.8% had a female householder with no husband present, and 15.2% were non-families. 12.7% of all households were made up of individuals, and 4.4% had someone living alone who was 65 years of age or older. The average household size was 2.91 and the average family size was 3.17.

The population was 29.9% under the age of 18, 5.1% from 18 to 24, 29.3% from 25 to 44, 27.6% from 45 to 64, and 8.0% who were 65 years of age or older. The median age was 38 years. For every 100 females, there were 108.2 males. For every 100 females age 18 and over, there were 106.0 males.

The median income for a household in the town was $61,645, and the median income for a family was $67,656. Males had a median income of $37,409 versus $27,467 for females. The per capita income for the town was $23,539. About 1.0% of families and 2.0% of the population were below the poverty line, including 0.5% of those under age 18 and 3.9% of those age 65 or over.

== Notable people ==
- C. N. Saugen, Wisconsin State Representative
