= Foster, Eau Claire County, Wisconsin =

Foster, Wisconsin
- Unincorporated community
- Location within Wisconsin Location within the United States
- Coordinates: 44°38′35″N 91°18′43″W
- Country: United States
- State: Wisconsin
- County: Eau Claire
- Elevation: 978 ft (298 m)
- Time zone: UTC-6 (Central (CST))
  - Summer (DST): UTC-5 (CDT)
- Area codes: 715 & 534
- GNIS feature ID: 1565162

Foster is an unincorporated community in the town of Clear Creek in Eau Claire County, Wisconsin, United States. It lies approximately nine miles south-southwest of Fall Creek, seven miles southeast of Cleghorn and six miles northwest of Osseo. Located primarily along Eau Claire County Highway "HH", it is flanked on the west by U.S. Highway 53 and on the east by Interstate 94, being the site of I-94's exit #81 in Wisconsin, placing it 11 miles southeast along the freeway from southeastern Eau Claire and seven miles northwest of Osseo.

== History ==
The community was originally called Emmett, but the name was changed to Foster in honor of George E. Foster, who financed the Fairchild and North-Eastern Railway, which ran from Foster to Fairchild in 1912.

Two people were killed by an F3 tornado that struck Foster on August 27, 1994.
