= Clear Creek, Wisconsin =

- Town
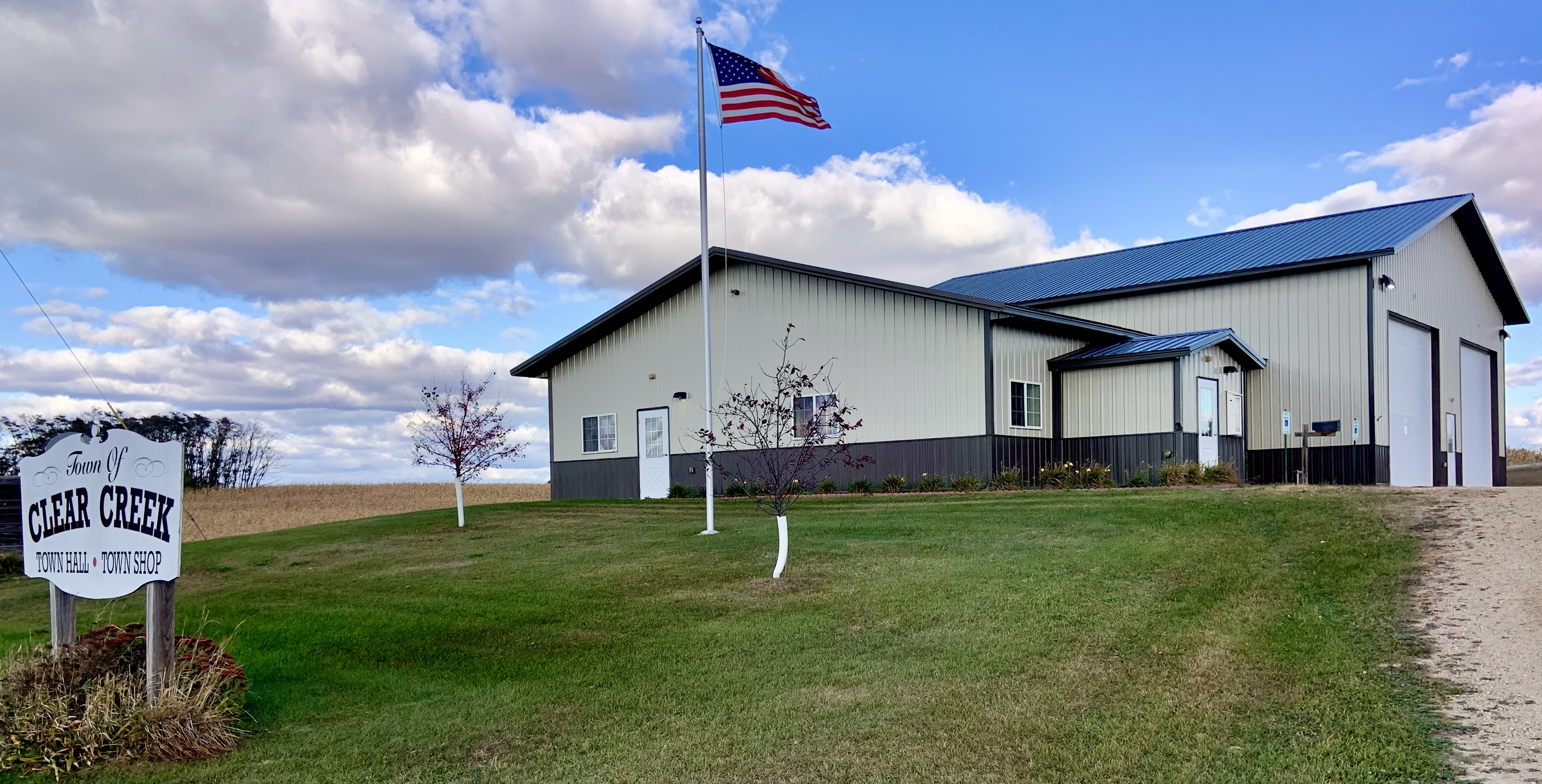
- Town hall

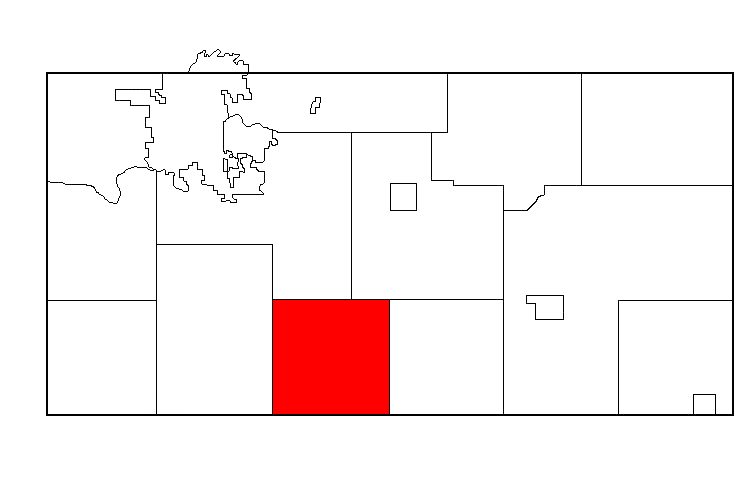
- Clear Creek within Eau Claire County

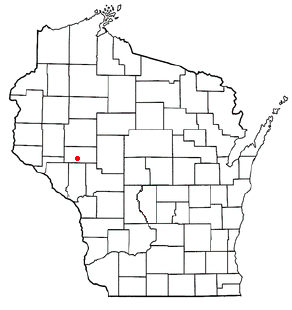
- Location of Clear Creek, Wisconsin
- Coordinates: 44°38′39″N 91°20′32″W
- Country: United States
- State: Wisconsin
- County: Eau Claire

Area
  - Total: 35.9 sq mi (93.1 km^{2})
  - Land: 35.9 sq mi (93.1 km^{2})
  - Water: 0 sq mi (0.0 km^{2})
- Elevation: 1,080 ft (330 m)

Population (2020)
  - Total: 778
  - Density: 21.6/sq mi (8.36/km^{2})
- Time zone: UTC-6 (Central (CST))
  - Summer (DST): UTC-5 (CDT)
- Area codes: 715 & 534
- FIPS code: 55-15200
- GNIS feature ID: 1582970
- Website: https://townofclearcreek.gov/

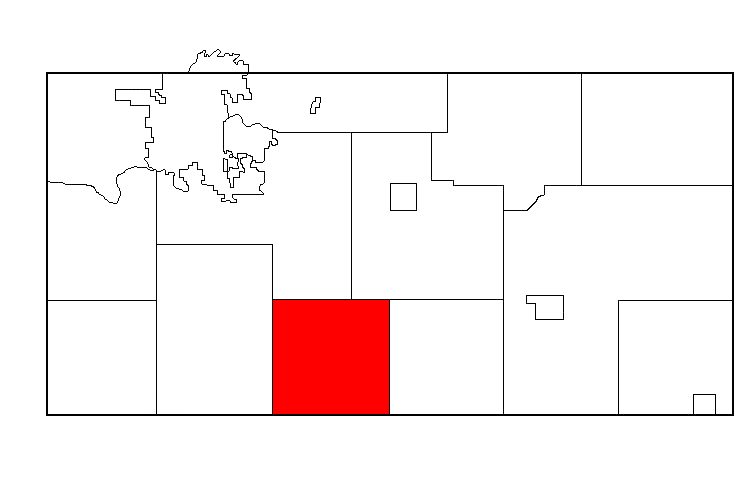
Clear Creek within Eau Claire County

Clear Creek is a town in Eau Claire County, Wisconsin, United States. The population was 778 at the 2020 census. The unincorporated communities of Allen, Foster, and Nix Corner are located within the town.

== Geography ==
According to the United States Census Bureau, the town has a total area of 35.9 square miles (93.1 km^{2}), all land.

== Demographics ==
Historical population
| Census | Pop. | Note | %± |
|---|---|---|---|
| 1990 | 692 | | — |
| 2000 | 712 | | 2.9% |
| 2010 | 821 | | 15.3% |
| 2020 | 778 | | −5.2% |

At the 2000 census, there were 712 people, 268 households and 216 families residing in the town. The population density was 19.8 per square mile (7.6/km^{2}). There were 278 housing units at an average density of 7.7 per square mile (3.0/km^{2}). The racial makeup of the town was 99.16% White, 0.42% from other races, and 0.42% from two or more races. Hispanic or Latino of any race were 0.98% of the population.

There were 268 households, of which 34.0% had children under the age of 18 living with them, 69.8% were married couples living together, 6.0% had a female householder with no husband present, and 19.4% were non-families. 13.8% of all households were made up of individuals, and 4.9% had someone living alone who was 65 years of age or older. The average household size was 2.66 and the average family size was 2.91.

26.4% of the population were under the age of 18, 5.2% from 18 to 24, 31.2% from 25 to 44, 25.0% from 45 to 64, and 12.2% who were 65 years of age or older. The median age was 37 years. For every 100 females, there were 121.8 males. For every 100 females age 18 and over, there were 112.1 males.

The median household income was $44,833 and the median family income was $48,229. Males had a median income of $31,458 compared with $24,375 for females. The per capita income for the town was $17,360. About 4.3% of families and 7.6% of the population were below the poverty line, including 5.1% of those under age 18 and 5.7% of those age 65 or over.
