= Warren Petryk =

21st century American politician

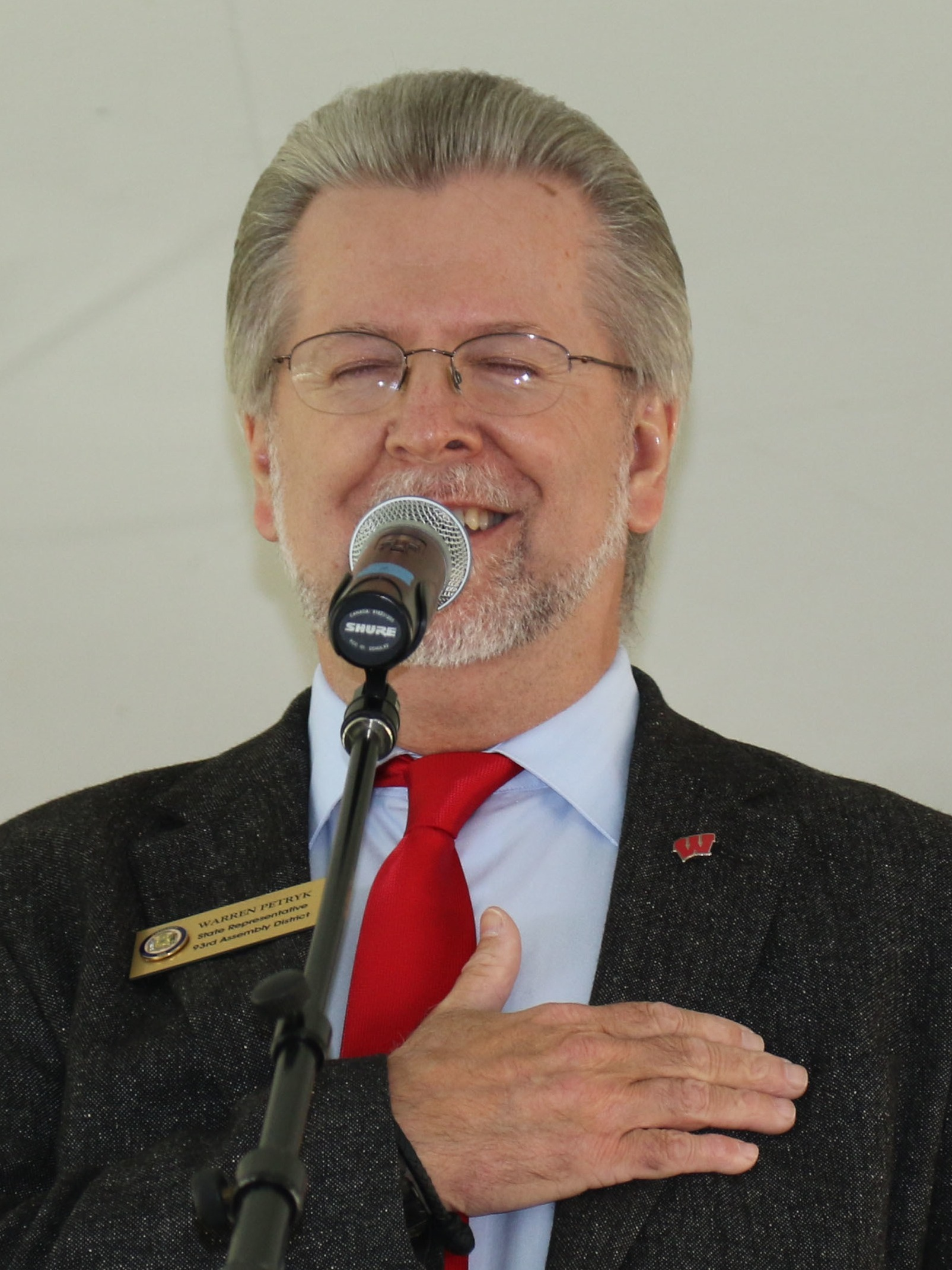
- Petryk in 2017

Member of the Wisconsin State Assembly from the 93rd district
- In office January 3, 2011 – January 6, 2025
- Preceded by: Jeff Smith
- Succeeded by: Christian Phelps

Personal details
- Born: January 24, 1955 (age 71) Eau Claire, Wisconsin, U.S.
- Party: Republican
- Spouse: Jane Norby (m. 2019)
- Education: University of Wisconsin–Stout; University of Wisconsin–Eau Claire (BA)
- Profession: Politician
- Salary: $53,299
- Website: Official website

Warren Petryk (born January 24, 1955) is an American public relations professional and Republican politician from Eau Claire County, Wisconsin. He served 12 terms as a member of the Wisconsin State Assembly, representing Wisconsin's 93rd Assembly district from 2011 to 2025. While serving in the Assembly, he was chair of Assembly Committee on Workforce Development from 2015 to 2025.

== Early life and education ==
Petryk was born on January 24, 1955, and grew up in Boyceville, Wisconsin, in Dunn County. He obtained the highest honor of the Boy Scouts of America by obtaining the rank of Eagle Scout in 1969. He graduated as valedictorian from Boyceville High School in 1973.

Petryk attended the University of Wisconsin–Stout and earned a Bachelor of Arts degree in Philosophy with highest honors from the University of Wisconsin–Eau Claire in 1978.

== Career ==
In 1972, during high school, Petryk co-founded the musical entertainment group "The Memories." He continues to actively perform as part of "The Memories" at venues in the Midwest and across the United States.

In 1996, Petryk began working for United Cerebral Palsy of West Central Wisconsin, where he spent 15 years working in community relations.

== Awards and memberships ==
Recipient of Wisconsin Veterans of Foreign Wars Legislator of the Year in 2013; AMVETS Veteran's Advocate of the Year in 2014; Wisconsin Electrical Cooperative Association's Most Enlightened Legislator in 2016; Wisconsin School Nutrition Association's Legislator of the Year in 2016; Wisconsin Manufacturers and Commerce Working Wisconsin Award (every term); Dairy Business Association's Legislative Excellence Award (every term); Wisconsin Economic Development Association's Champion of Economic Development Award in 2018; Wisconsin Towns Association's Friend of Towns Award in 2018 and 2020; Wisconsin Counties Association's Outstanding Legislator Award in 2020; and the Wisconsin Association for Talented and Gifted's Outstanding Legislator Award in 2020.

Petryk is a member of the Eau Claire, Menomonie, Ellsworth, and Prescott Chambers of Commerce; the National Rifle Association; Eau Galle-Rush River, Ellsworth, Durand, Rock Falls, and Arkansaw Sportsmen's Clubs; Wisconsin Farm Bureau; Sons of the American Legion; Cleghorn Lions Club; and the Board of Directors of the Chippewa Valley Council of the Boy Scouts of America.

Petryk defeated Jeff Smith in the 2010, 2012, and 2014 Wisconsin State Assembly races. He was unopposed in 2016. In 2018 and 2020, he defeated Mondovi real estate broker Charlene "Charlie" Warner.

== Electoral history ==
2010 Wisconsin Assembly 93rd District Election, Republican Primary
Party	Candidate	Votes	%
Republican	Warren Petryk	1,728	39.17%
Republican	Mike Conlin	1,590	36.05%
Republican	Isaac Weix	1,091	24.73%
Write-in		2	0.05%
Total votes		4,411	100.0%

2010 Wisconsin Assembly 93rd District Election
Party	Candidate	Votes	%
Republican	Warren Petryk	11,080	50.12%
Democratic	Jeff Smith (inc)	11,006	49.79%
Write-in		19	0.05%
Total votes		22,105	100.0%
Republican gain from Democratic			

2012 Wisconsin Assembly 93rd District Election
Party	Candidate	Votes	%
Republican	Warren Petryk	15,612	50.78%
Democratic	Jeff Smith	15,114	49.16%
Write-in		16	0.05%
Total votes		30,742	100.0%
Republican hold			

2014 Wisconsin Assembly 93rd District Election
Party	Candidate	Votes	%
Republican	Warren Petryk	13,367	55.40%
Democratic	Jeff Smith	10,749	44.55%
Write-in		14	0.06%
Total votes		24,130	100.0%
Republican hold			

2016 Wisconsin Assembly 93rd District Election
Party	Candidate	Votes	%
Republican	Warren Petryk	24,298	98.49%
Write-in		372	1.51%
Total votes		24,670	100.0%
Republican hold			

2018 Wisconsin Assembly 93rd District Election
Party	Candidate	Votes	%
Republican	Warren Petryk	15,935	55.13%
Democratic	Charlene "Charlie" Warner	11,435	41.76%
Write-in		11	0.04%
Total votes		27,381	100.0%
Republican hold			

2020 Wisconsin Assembly 93rd District Election
Party	Candidate	Votes	%
Republican	Warren Petryk	22,179	61.65%
Democratic	Charlene "Charlie" Warner	13,773	38.29%
Write-in		21	0.06%
Total votes		35,973	100.0%
Republican hold			

Wisconsin State Assembly
Preceded by Jeff Smith	Member of the Wisconsin State Assembly from the 93rd district January 3, 2011 – January 6, 2025	Succeeded by Christian Phelps
